= Na tvojim rukama =

Single by Franka Batelić

from the album Franka
- Released: 25 January 2010
- Recorded: 2009
- Genre: Pop; electropop; dance-pop; teen pop; pop rock
- Length: 2:59
- Label: Hit Eecords
- Songwriters: Miro Buljan; Boris Đurđević; Neno Ninčević
- Producers: Miro Buljan; Boris Đurđević

Franka Batelić singles chronology
"Moje najdraže" (2009)	"Na tvojim rukama" (2010)	"Crna duga" (2011)

"Na tvojim rukama" (English translation: On your arms) is a pop song by the Croatian singer Franka Batelić, recorded for the Croatian selection for the Eurovision Song Contest 2010. It finished 8th with a total of 18 points won.

== HRT Dora 2010 ==
With "Na tvojim rukama" Franka Batelić took part in the Croatian selection for the Eurovision Song Contest 2010, and qualified directly to the final on 6 March. The final of Dora 2010 was held on 6 March 2010 in which sixteen contestants took part in; Batelić performed twelfth. Her song received only nine points from the jury and 12 points from the public votes, and finished 7th with a total of 21 points.

== See also ==
- Croatia in the Eurovision Song Contest
- Croatia in the Eurovision Song Contest 2010
- HRT Dora
