= Pirro Çako =

Albanian singer

- Born: 19 November 1965 (age 60); Tirana, PR Albania
- Origin: Tirana, Albania
- Occupations: Singer, composer
- Instruments: Piano, vocals

Pirro Çako (born 19 November, 1965) is an Albanian singer and composer. In 1988, he won the Festivali i Këngës as a composer with the song E duam lumturinë (English: We love happiness). The song was interpreted by Parashqevi Simaku. He has issued two albums: Herët a vonë (English: Sooner or Later) in June 2004 and including 15 songs, and more recently, a second album, Mos më krahaso (English: Don't Compare Me), a set of 12 songs. In a collaboration with composer Ardit Gjebrea, Çako wrote the song It's All About You (Albanian: Nuk mundem pa ty), interpreted by Juliana Pasha for the Albanian national final for the Eurovision Song Contest 2010.

== Life ==
Çako was born on 19 November 1965 in Tirana, Albania, to tenor Gaqo Çako and soprano Luiza Çako. Çako graduated from the Academy of Music and Arts of Albania and later obtained a degree in the École Normale de Musique de Paris for film music composing.

In 1988 E duam lumturinë (English: We love the happiness), a song written by Çako, won the Albanian national festival. The song was interpreted by Parashqevi Simaku and has now transformed into an anthem of the children.

His duet with Rovena Dilo Për një çast më ndali zemra (English: For a moment my heart stopped) is considered to be one of Çako's best performances. The song participated in and won the Kënga Magjike (2001), a well-known musical event in Albania.

In 2010 in a collaboration with Ardit Gjebrea Çako wrote the song "It's All About You" (Albanian: Nuk mundem pa ty), interpreted by Juliana Pasha for the Albanian national final for the Eurovision Song Contest 2010. The song won the festival, and later it was written and performed in English. Çako also composed a song for Rovena Dilo in Rtsh Festival 2001 called AntiNostradamus (Antinostradamus) and participated in Rtsh 2009 with a song written by him & composed by him called "Nje Tjeter Jete" (English: Another Life) which received 4th place out of 20 participants.

== Personal life ==
Çako was the former husband of the soprano, Inva Mula whom he married in 1987. According to their divorce files, Çako separated from Mula in 2007 and a divorce was completed in 2010 after 23 years of marriage. Çako and Mula have a son, Anthony Çako, born in 1995 in Paris France, where the couple shared a dwelling.

== Albums discography ==
Çako published his first album Herët a vonë (English: Sooner or Later) in June 2004. The album contains 15 songs, solos and duos with Rovena Dilo, Mariza Ikonomi, Redon Makashi, as well as Çako's former wife Inva Mula, a well-known soprano.

Heret a Vone track listing
| No. | Title | Length |
|---|---|---|
| 1. | "Taka Krak" | 3:38 |
| 2. | "Kuturu" | 4:05 |
| 3. | "Larg Nga Syte...Prej Zemres Larg" | 3:15 |
| 4. | "Ndjenje e Pathene" | 3:30 |
| 5. | "Falja Njerit Dashurine" | 4:05 |
| 6. | "E Dashur Erdha" | 3:50 |
| 7. | "Heret a Vone" | 3:27 |
| 8. | "Xhulit" | 3:27 |
| 9. | "Fajtori" | 3:23 |
| 10. | "Une Ai Ti Ajo" | 3:47 |
| 11. | "Eklipsi i Dashurise" | 3:39 |
| 12. | "Irene" | 4:18 |
| 13. | "Shprese" | 3:26 |
| 14. | "Per Nje Çast Me Ndali Zemra" | 4:22 |
| 15. | "Ylli Im" | 4:03 |
| Total length: | | 56:23 |

In 2006, he issued a second album Mos më krahaso (English: Don't Compare Me), a set of 12 songs, including the joyful "Letër Dashurie" (English: Love Letter).

In 2023 Çako released a triptych, consisting of three distinct songs, providing a musical journey through the recent years of his life. The first track, "Shpirt", is a poignant exploration of love, accompanied by unique guitar and string elements. Followed by "Tjeter Njeri", a composition that highlights his new life in a soul-stirring ballad that resonates with its emotive depth and haunting melody. The last songs of the triptych is called "Radio ne Qiell".

2023 triptych track listing
| No. | Title | Length |
|---|---|---|
| 1. | "Shpirt" | 3:35 |
| 2. | "Tjeter Njeri" | 3:30 |
| 3. | "Radio ne Qiell" |

== Awards and nominations ==
Festivali i Këngës

| Year | Nominee / work | Award | Result |
|---|---|---|---|
| 1988 | "E duam lumturinë" | First Prize As Composer | Won |
| 2010 | "Nuk mundem pa ty" | First Prize As Songwriter | Won |

Kënga Magjike

| Year | Nominee / work | Award | Result |
|---|---|---|---|
| 2001 | "Për një çast më ndali zemra (ft.Rovena Dilo)" | First Prize | Won |
| 2003 | "Unë Ai, Ti, Ajo" | Best Songwriter in Festival | Won |
| 2004 | "Leter dashurie" | Cesk Zadeja Prize | Won |
| 2004 | "Leter dashurie" | Third Prize | Won |
| 2008 | "Anjushka" | Hit Song | Won |
| 2010 | "Mirëmbrëma si je" | Best Songwriter in Festival | Won |
| 2010 | "Mirëmbrëma si je" | Second Prize | Won |
| 2011 | "Vetem Buje (ft.Vedat Ademi)" | Style Song | Won |
| 2011 | "Vetem Buje (ft.Vedat Ademi)" | Second Prize | Won |
| 2012 | "Dalldisa" | Best Artistic Contribution | Won |

Kult Awards

| Year | Nominee / work | Award | Result |
|---|---|---|---|
| 2007 | "Miku im" | Best Album of the Year | Won |

Video Fest Awards

| Year | Nominee / work | Award | Result |
|---|---|---|---|
| 2007 | "Ah, moj dashuria ime!" | Best Video / First Prize | Nominated |
| 2007 | "Ah, moj dashuria ime!" | Best Male | Nominated |
| 2007 | "Ah, moj dashuria ime!" | Best Director | Nominated |
| 2007 | "Ah, moj dashuria ime!" | Best Production | Nominated |
| 2007 | "Ah, moj dashuria ime!" | Best Camera | Nominated |
| 2008 | "Engjell apo djallë" | Best Camera | Nominated |
