= Albania in the Eurovision Song Contest 2010 =

- Eurovision Song Contest 2010
- Participating broadcaster: Radio Televizioni Shqiptar (RTSH)
- Country: Albania
- Selection process: Festivali i Këngës 48
- Selection date: 27 December 2009

Competing entry
- Song: "It's All About You"
- Artist: Juliana Pasha
- Songwriters: Ardit Gjebrea; Pirro Çako

Placement
- Semi-final result: Qualified (6th, 76 points)
- Final result: 16th, 62 points

Participation chronology

Albania was represented at the Eurovision Song Contest 2010 with the song "It's All About You", written by Ardit Gjebrea and Pirro Çako, and performed by Juliana Pasha. The Albanian participating broadcaster, Radio Televizioni Shqiptar (RTSH), selected its entry through the national selection competition Festivali i Këngës in December 2009. Prior to the contest, the song was promoted by a music video and live performances both in Macedonia and the Netherlands.

Albania was drawn to compete in the first semi-final of the Eurovision Song Contest, which took place on 25 May 2010. Performing as number 12, the nation was announced among the top 10 entries of the first semi-final and therefore qualified to compete in the grand final. In the final on 29 May 2010, it performed as number 15 and placed 16th out of the 25 participating countries, scoring 62 points.

== Background ==
Prior to the 2010 contest, Radio Televizioni Shqiptar (RTSH) had participated in the Eurovision Song Contest representing Albania six times since its first entry in 2004. Its highest placing in the contest, to this point, had been the seventh place, achieved in 2004 with the song "The Image of You" performed by Anjeza Shahini. During its tenure in the contest, it failed to qualify for the final two times, with the 2007 entry being the most recent non-qualifier.

As part of its duties as participating broadcaster, RTSH organises the selection of its entry in the Eurovision Song Contest and broadcasts the event in the country. RTSH has organised Festivali i Këngës since its inauguration in 1962. Since 2003, the winner of the competition has simultaneously won the right to represent Albania in the Eurovision Song Contest.

== Before Eurovision ==
=== Festivali i Këngës ===
RTSH organised the 48th edition of Festivali i Këngës to determine Albania's representative for the Eurovision Song Contest 2010. The competition consisted of three semi-finals on 24, 25 and 26 December, respectively, and the grand final on 27 December 2009. The four live shows were hosted by Albanian singers Miriam Cani and Alban Skënderaj. After three withdrawals, there were two different categories in Festivali i Këngës, namely the Big Group and the Young Group.

==== Competing entries ====
Key: Withdrawn

Participating entries in the Big Group
Artist(s)	Song	Songwriter(s)
Anjeza Shahini	"Në pasqyrë"	Sokol Marsi; Jorgo Papingji
Besa Kokëdhima (Note: Prior to the scheduled semi-finals, Radio Televizioni Shqiptar (RTSH) announced the withdrawal of Besa Kokëdhima, Eliza Hoxha and Jorida Zaimaj. However, Kokëdhima was later replaced by Pirro Çako.)	"Kalorësi i dashurisë"	Unknown
Bojken Lako and Banda Adriatica	"Love Love Love"	Bojken Lako; Banda Adriatica
Claudio La Regina	"Ave Maria"	Scaravaglione
Denisa Macaj	"Aria"	Adrian Hila; Pandi Laço
Dorina Garuci	"Sekreti i dashurisë"	Klodian Qafoku; Arben Duka
Eliza Hoxha	"Në mes"	Unknown
Era Rusi	"Fjalë dhe gjunjë"	Arsen Nasi; Alina Laço
Erga Halilaj	"Party"	Dorian Nini; Adrian Nini
Erti Hizmo and Lindita Halimi	"Nuk të dorëzohem"	Gent Myftaraj; Pandi Laço
Flaka Krelani	"Le të bëhet çfarë të dojë"	Edmond Zhulali; Jorgo Papingji
Guximtar Rushani	"Gëzuar"	Agim Poshka; Olsa Maze
Juliana Pasha	"Nuk mundem pa ty"	Ardit Gjebrea; Pirro Çako
Kamela Islamaj	"Gjëra të thjeshta"	Kristi Popa; Florion Zyko
Kejsi Tola	"Ndonjëherë"	Voltan Prodani; Timo Flloko
Mariza Ikonomi	"Vazhdoj këndoj"	Mariza Ikonomi
Pirro Çako	"Një tjetër jetë"	Ardit Gjebrea; Pirro Çako
Rovena Dilo	"Përtej kohës"	Rovena Dilo
Stefi and Endri Prifti	"U dogja mrekullisht"	Stefi Prifti; Marina Prifti
Teuta Kurti	"Mall i pashuar"	Faton Dolaku; Pleurat Kurti

Participating entries in the Young Group
Artist(s)	Song	Songwriter(s)
Amanda Ujkaj and Violeta Lulgjuraj	"Vitet më të bukura"	Luigj Dedvukaj; Sokol Marsi
Ardita Tusha	"Je larg"	Edmond Mancaku
Borana Kalemi	"Ti"	Borana Kalemi; Anila Jole
Brikena Asa	"Sa dua unë"	Gjergj Jorgaqi
Çlirim Leka	"Nëna ime"	Çlirim Leka
Dorina Toçi	"Një fjalë të ngrohtë"	Petrit Tërkuçi; Demir Gjergji
Goldi Halili	"Tirana Brodway"	Agim Krajka; Goldi Halili
Iris Hoxha	"Zërin tim ta ndjesh"	Edmond Rrapi; Ledi Shqiponja
Jona Koleci	"Stinë dashurië"	Mark Luli; Olda Toqi
Jorida Zaimaj	"Për ty"	Unknown
Kelly	"Ajo"	Florian Carkanj
Lutus	"Botë pa sy"	Endrit Shani; Kristi Ndrio
Nazmie Selimi	"Mendohu dhe njëherë"	Alfred Kaçinari
Onanta Spahiu	"Dashurisë i erdhi vjeshta"	Renuar Nimani; Arjan Kadare
Selina Prelaj	"Të dy e dimë"	Selina Prelaj; Agim Doçi
Stefan Marena	"Retë s'na ndajnë"	Roland Guli; Meri Guli
Supernova	"Gabimi"	Briz Musaraj; Arjan Aliko
Vitmar Basha	"Një tjetër jetë"	Vitmar Basha
Yje Të Panjohur	"Si dy të huaj"	Florian Zyka

==== Shows ====
===== Semi-final 1 =====
The first semi-final of Festivali i Këngës took place on 24 December 2009 and was broadcast live at 20:30 (CET). 18 contestants from the Big Group participated in the first semi-final, with all of them progressing to the grand final.

Semi-final 1 – 24 December 2009
R/O	Artist(s)	Song
1	Anjeza Shahini	"Në pasqyrë"
2	Teuta Kurti	"Mall i pashuar"
3	Claudio La Regina	"Ave Maria"
4	Kamela Islamaj	"Gjëra të thjeshta"
5	Bojken Lako and Banda Adriatica	"Love Love Love"
6	Pirro Çako	"Një tjetër jetë"
7	Dorina Garuci	"Sekreti i dashurisë"
8	Juliana Pasha	"Nuk mundem pa ty"
9	Denisa Macaj	"Aria"
10	Erga Halilaj	"Party"
11	Era Rusi	"Fjalë dhe gjunjë"
12	Flaka Krelani	"Le të bëhet çfarë të dojë"
13	Mariza Ikonomi	"Vazhdoj këndoj"
14	Erti Hizmo and Lindita Halimi	"Nuk të dorëzohem"
15	Stefi and Endri Prifti	"U dogja mrekullisht"
16	Guximtar Rushani	"Gëzuar"
17	Rovena Dilo	"Përtej kohës"
18	Kejsi Tola	"Ndonjëherë"

===== Semi-final 2 =====
The second semi-final of Festivali i Këngës took place on 25 December 2009 and was broadcast live at 20:30 (CET). 18 contestants from the Young Group participated in the second semi-final, with the highlighted ones progressing to the grand final.

Semi-final 2 – 25 December 2009
R/O	Artist(s)	Song
1	Stefan Marena	"Retë s'na ndajnë"
2	Brikena Asa	"Sa dua unë"
3	Onanta Spahiu	"Dashurisë i erdhi vjeshta"
4	Jona Koleci	"Stinë dashurië"
5	Nazmie Selimi	"Mendohu dhe njëherë"
6	Goldi Halili	"Tirana Brodway"
7	Iris Hoxha	"Zërin tim ta ndjesh"
8	Supernova	"Gabimi"
9	Ardita Tusha	"Je larg"
10	Selina Prelaj	"Të dy e dimë"
11	Vitmar Basha	"Një tjetër jetë"
12	Lutus	"Botë pa sy"
13	Kelly	"Ajo"
14	Dorina Toçi	"Një fjalë të ngrohtë"
15	Borana Kalemi	"Ti"
16	Amanda Ujkaj and Violeta Lulgjuraj	"Vitet më të bukura"
17	Yje Të Panjohur	"Si dy të huaj"
18	Çlirim Leka	"Nëna ime"

===== Semi-final 3 =====
The third semi-final of Festivali i Këngës took place on 26 December 2009 and was broadcast live at 20:30 (CET). It featured 20 artists, including 18 from the Big Group and two from the Young Group, each performing a duet with an other Albanian artist.

Semi-final 3 – 26 December 2009
R/O	Artist(s)	Song
1	Iris Hoxha and Kelly	"Zërin tim ta ndjesh"
2	Guximtar Rushani and Agim Poshka	"Gëzuar"
3	Era Rusi and Julian Bulku	"Fjalë dhe gjunjë"
4	Goldi Halili and Aleksander Gjoka	"Tirana Brodway"
5	Erti Hizmo, Lindita Halimi and Redon Makashi	"Nuk të dorëzohem"
6	Mariza Ikonomi and Vedat Ademi	"La, la, la"
7	Kejsi Tola and Voltan Prodani	"Ndonjëherë"
8	Claudio La Regina and Franco Scaravaglione	"Ave Maria"
9	Erga Halilaj, Adrian Nini and Ronela Hajati	"Party"
10	Teuta Kurti and Malda Susuri	"Mall i pashuar"
11	Dorina Garuci and Dr. Flori	"Sekreti i dashurisë"
12	Bojken Lako, Banda Adriatica and Ajkuna	"Love Love Love"
13	Rovena Dilo and Eranda Libohova	"Përtej kohës"
14	Pirro Çako, Rosela Gjylbegu and Eliza Hoxha	"Një tjetër jetë"
15	Denisa Macaj and Olta Boka	"Aria"
16	Stefi Prifti, Endri Prifti and Burn	"U dogja mrekullisht"
17	Juliana Pasha and Soni Malaj	"Nuk mundem pa ty"
18	Anjeza Shahini and Eneda Tarifa	"Në pasqyrë"
19	Kamela Islami and Kristi Popa	"Gjëra të thjeshta"
20	Flaka Krelani and Jonida Maliqi	"Le të bëhet çfarë të dojë"

===== Final =====
The grand final of Festivali i Këngës took place on 27 December 2009 and was broadcast live at 20:30 (CET). Determined by the combination of the votes from a seven-member jury, Juliana Pasha emerged as the winner and was simultaneously announced as Albania's representative for the Eurovision Song Contest 2010.

Final – 27 December 2009
R/O	Artist(s)	Song	Points	Result
1	Pirro Çako	"Një tjetër jetë"	106	4
2	Erga Halilaj	"Party"	66	12
3	Denisa Macaj	"Aria"	92	7
4	Rovena Dilo	"Përtej kohës"	69	10
5	Dorina Garuci	"Sekreti i dashurisë"	78	8
6	Anjeza Shahini	"Në pasqyrë"	118	2
7	Erti Hizmo and Lindita Halimi	"Nuk të dorëzohem"	66	12
8	Juliana Pasha	"Nuk mundem pa ty"	133	1
9	Guximtar Rushani	"Gëzuar"	43	17
10	Kejsi Tola	"Ndonjëherë"	58	15
11	Teuta Kurti	"Mall i pashuar"	19	19
12	Flaka Krelani	"Le të bëhet çfarë të dojë"	99	5
13	Bojken Lako and Banda Adriatica	"Love Love Love"	98	6
14	Goldi Halili	"Tirana Brodway"	64	14
15	Stefi and Endri Prifti	"U dogja mrekullisht"	45	16
16	Iris Hoxha	"Zërin tim ta ndjesh"	67	11
17	Claudio La Regina	"Ave Maria"	17	20
18	Era Rusi	"Fjalë dhe gjunjë"	41	18
19	Mariza Ikonomi	"La, la, la"	76	9
20	Kamela Islamaj	"Gjëra të thjeshta"	115	3

=== Promotion ===
A music video for "It's All About You" premiered via the Eurovision Song Contest's official YouTube channel on 23 March 2010. For promotional purposes, Pasha embarked on a small tour with live performances at various events related to the contest, including in Macedonia and the Netherlands.

== At Eurovision ==
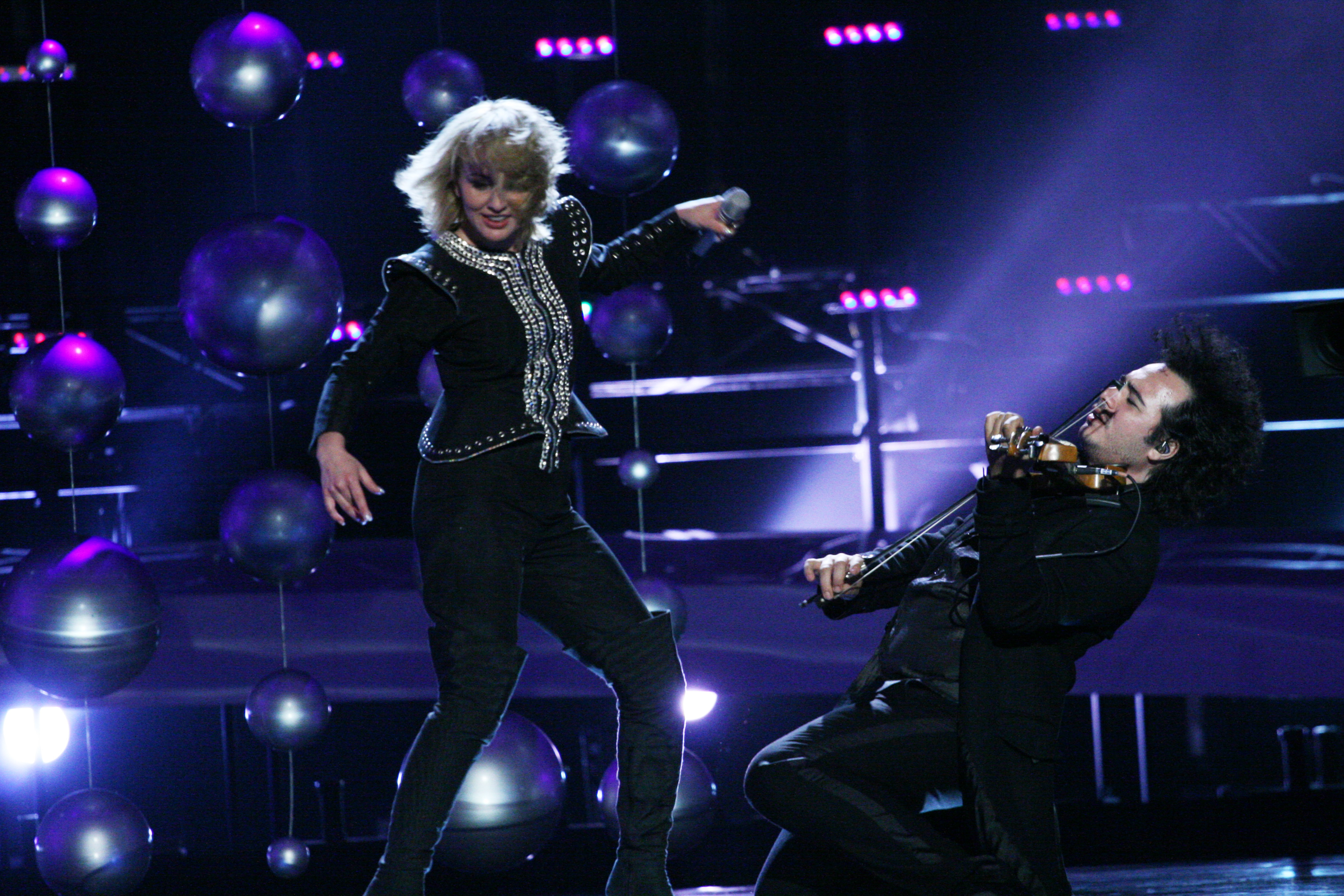
Juliana Pasha performing in the first semi-final of the Eurovision Song Contest 2010.

The Eurovision Song Contest 2010 took place at Telenor Arena in Oslo, Norway, and consisted of two semi-finals held on 25 and 27 May, respectively, and the grand final on 29 May 2010. According to the Eurovision rules, all participating countries, except the host nation and the "Big Four", consisting of France, Germany, Spain and the United Kingdom, were required to qualify from one of the two semi-finals to compete for the grand final, although the top 10 countries from the respective semi-final progress to the grand final. The EBU split up the competing countries into five different pots based on voting patterns from previous contests, as evaluated by Digame, in order to decrease the influence of neighbour and diaspora voting. On 7 February 2010, an allocation draw was held which placed each country into one of the two semi-finals and determined which half of the show they would perform in. Albania was placed into the first semi-final held on 25 May and was scheduled to perform in the second half of the show. Once all the competing songs for the 2010 contest had been released, the running order for the semi-finals was revealed; Albania was set to perform at position 12, following Malta and preceding Greece. After qualifying for the final with a sixth-place finish in the semi-final, it was announced that Albania would be performing 15th in the final, following Turkey and preceding Iceland. At the final, the nation placed 16th out of the 25 competing entries.

=== Voting ===
Voting during the three shows involved each country awarding points from 1–8, 10 and 12 as determined by a combination of 50% national jury and 50% televoting. Each nation's jury consisted of five music industry professionals who are citizens of the country they represent. This jury judged each entry based on: vocal capacity; the stage performance; the song's composition and originality; and the overall impression by the act. In addition, no member of a national jury was permitted to be related in any way to any of the competing acts in such a way that they cannot vote impartially and independently.

The tables below visualise a breakdown of points awarded to Albania in both the first semi-final and the grand final of the Eurovision Song Contest 2010, as well as by the country on both occasions. In the semi-final, Albania finished in sixth place with a total of 76 points, including 12 from Greece and North Macedonia, and 10 from Iceland. In the grand final, Albania reached the 16th place, being awarded a total of 62 points, including 12 from North Macedonia and 10 from Greece. The nation awarded its 12 points to North Macedonia in the semi-final and to Greece in the final of the contest.

==== Points awarded to Albania ====
Points awarded to Albania (Semi-final 1)
Score	Country
12 points	Greece; Macedonia
10 points	Iceland
8 points	Belgium
7 points	Bosnia and Herzegovina
6 points	Malta
5 points	Germany
4 points	Finland; Poland; Spain
3 points	
2 points	France; Serbia
1 point	

Points awarded to Albania (Final)
Score	Country
12 points	Macedonia
10 points	Greece
8 points	Switzerland
7 points	Iceland; Turkey
6 points	
5 points	Bosnia and Herzegovina; Croatia
4 points	
3 points	Belgium
2 points	Poland
1 point	Germany; Romania; United Kingdom

==== Points awarded by Albania ====
Points awarded by Albania (Semi-final 1)
Score	Country
12 points	Macedonia
10 points	Greece
8 points	Iceland
7 points	Bosnia and Herzegovina
6 points	Poland
5 points	Portugal
4 points	Belgium
3 points	Serbia
2 points	Malta
1 point	Estonia

Points awarded by Albania (Final)
Score	Country
12 points	Greece
10 points	Germany
8 points	Turkey
7 points	Spain
6 points	Bosnia and Herzegovina
5 points	Romania
4 points	Israel
3 points	Serbia
2 points	Denmark
1 point	United Kingdom
