= Switzerland in the Eurovision Song Contest 2010 =

- Eurovision Song Contest 2010
- Participating broadcaster: Swiss Broadcasting Corporation (SRG SSR)
- Country: Switzerland
- Selection process: Internal selection
- Announcement date: Artist: 18 December 2009; Song: 9 January 2010

Competing entry
- Song: "Il pleut de l'or"
- Artist: Michael von der Heide
- Songwriters: Michael von der Heide; Pele Loriano; Heike Kospach

Placement
- Semi-final result: Failed to qualify (17th)

Participation chronology

Switzerland was represented at the Eurovision Song Contest 2010 with the song "Il pleut de l'or", written by Michael von der Heide, Pele Loriano, and Heike Kospach, and performed by Michael von der Heide. The Swiss participating broadcaster, the Swiss Broadcasting Corporation (SRG SSR), internally selected its entry for the contest. "Il pleut de l'or" was announced as the Swiss entry on 18 December 2009, while the song was presented to the public on 9 January 2010.

Switzerland was drawn to compete in the second semi-final of the Eurovision Song Contest which took place on 27 May 2010. Performing during the show in position 5, "Il pleut de l'or" was not announced among the top 10 entries of the second semi-final and therefore did not qualify to compete in the final. It was later revealed that Switzerland placed seventeenth (last) out of the 17 participating countries in the semi-final with 2 points.

== Background ==
Prior to the 2010 contest, the Swiss Broadcasting Corporation (SRG SSR) had participated in the Eurovision Song Contest representing Switzerland fifty times since its first entry in 1956. It won that first edition of the contest with the song "Refrain" performed by Lys Assia. Its second victory was achieved in 1988 with the song "Ne partez pas sans moi" performed by Canadian singer Céline Dion. Following the introduction of semi-finals for the 2004, Switzerland had managed to participate in the final two times up to this point. In 2005, the internal selection of the song "Cool Vibes" performed by Estonian girl band Vanilla Ninja, qualified Switzerland to the final where they placed 8th. Due to their successful result in 2005, Switzerland was pre-qualified to compete directly in the final in 2006. Since 2007, the nation failed to qualify to the final with a string of internal selections. In 2009, Lovebugs and their song "The Highest Heights" failed to qualify Switzerland to the final placing 14th in their semi-final.

As part of its duties as participating broadcaster, SRG SSR organises the selection of its entry in the Eurovision Song Contest and broadcasts the event in the country. The broadcaster confirmed its intentions to participate at the 2010 contest on 3 July 2009. Along with its participation confirmation, it also announced that its entry for the contest would be selected internally. SRG SSR has selected its entry for the Eurovision Song Contest through both national finals and internal selections in the past. Since 2005, the entry was internally selected.

== Before Eurovision ==
=== Internal selection ===
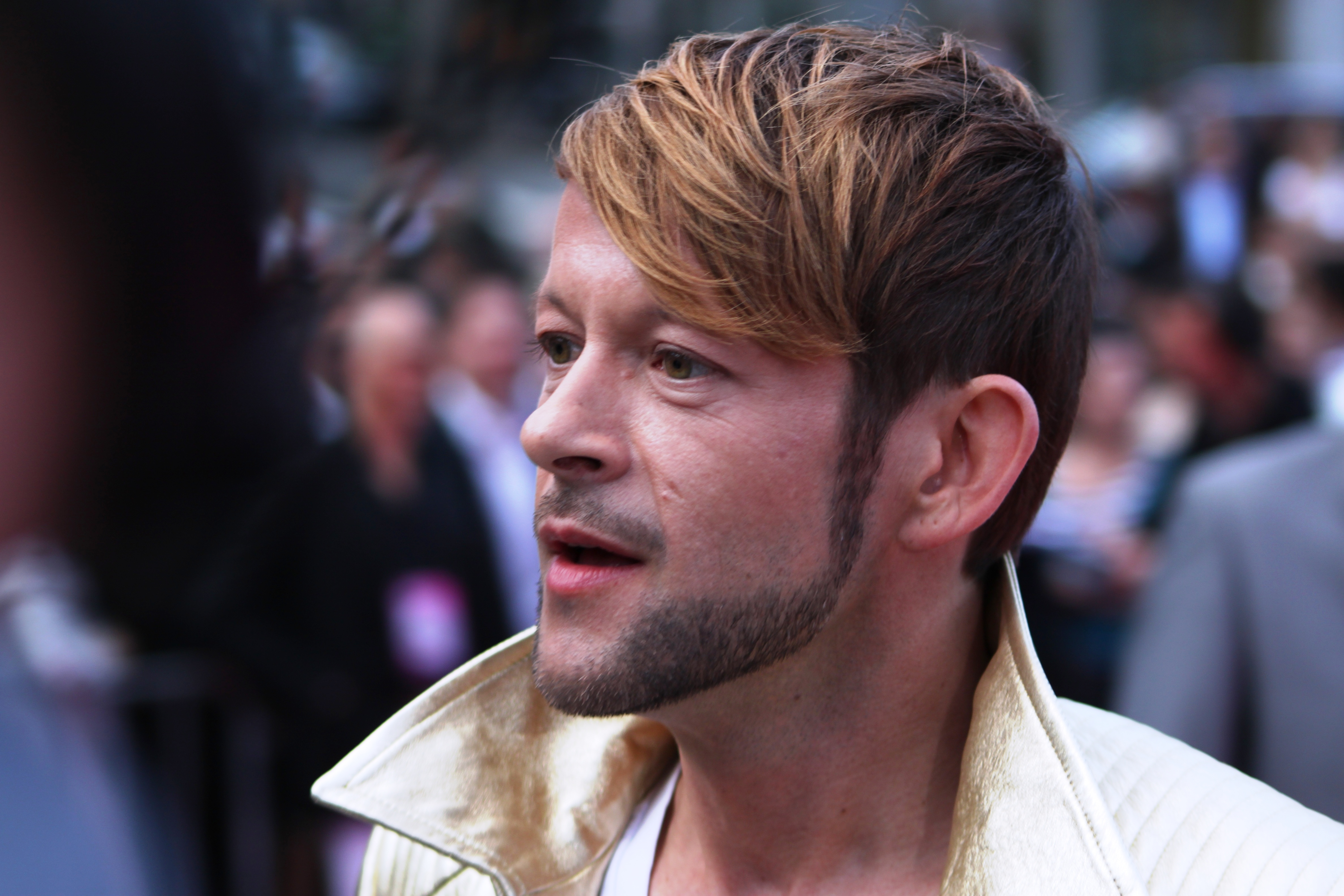
Michael von der Heide was internally selected to represent Switzerland in the Eurovision Song Contest 2010

SRG SSR opened a submission period between 3 July 2009 and 22 October 2009 for interested artists and composers to submit their entries. Eligible artists were those that have had television and stage experience (live performances), have made at least one video and have released at least one CD which placed among the top 50 in an official chart. In addition to the public submission, the broadcaster was also in contact with individual composers and lyricists as well as the music industry to be involved in the selection process. On 18 December 2009, "Il pleut de l'or" performed by Michael von der Heide was announced as the Swiss entry for the Eurovision Song Contest 2010. Michael von der Heide had previously attempted to represent Germany at the Eurovision Song Contest in 1999, placing fifth in the national final Countdown Grand Prix 1999 with the song "Bye Bye Bar". Both the artist and song were selected from over 60 entry submissions by a jury panel consisting of representatives of the three broadcasters in Switzerland: the Swiss-German broadcaster Schweizer Fernsehen (SF), the Swiss-French broadcaster Télévision Suisse Romande (TSR) and the Swiss-Italian broadcaster Radiotelevisione svizzera (RSI).

"Il pleut de l'or", which was written by Michael von der Heide together with Pele Loriano and Heike Kospach, was presented to the public on 9 January 2010 during the annual SwissAward show broadcast on SF1, TSR 2 and RSI La 2. The official music video of the song was released on 14 March 2010. English and German language versions of the song, respectively titled "It's Raining Gold" and "Es regnet Gold", were also released afterwards.

=== Promotion ===
Michael von der Heide made several appearances across Europe to specifically promote "Il pleut de l'or" as the Swiss Eurovision entry. On 27 February, Von der Heide performed a new version of "Il pleut de l'or" during the Latvian Eurovision national final Eirodziesma 2010. On 24 March, Von der Heide performed during the Eurovision in Concert event which was held at the Lexion venue in Zaanstad, Netherlands and hosted by Cornald Maas and Marga Bult.

== At Eurovision ==
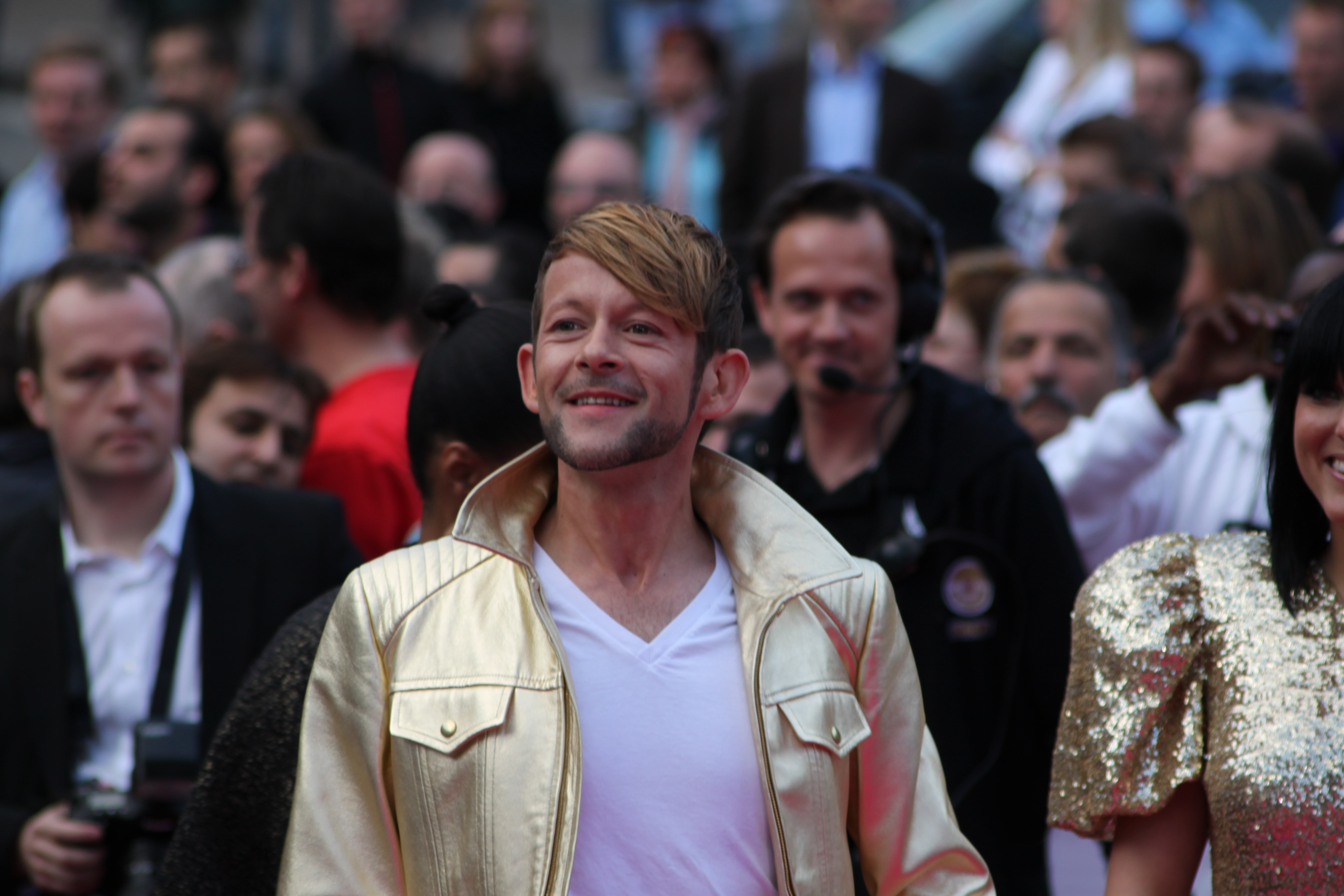
Michael von der Heide at the Eurovision Opening Party in Oslo

According to Eurovision rules, all nations with the exceptions of the host country and the "Big Four" (France, Germany, Spain and the United Kingdom) were required to qualify from one of two semi-finals in order to compete for the final; the top ten countries from each semi-final progress to the final. The European Broadcasting Union (EBU) split up the competing countries into six different pots based on voting patterns from previous contests, with countries with favourable voting histories put into the same pot. On 7 February 2010, a special allocation draw was held which placed each country into one of the two semi-finals, as well as which half of the show they would perform in. Switzerland was placed into the second semi-final, to be held on 27 May 2010, and was scheduled to perform in the first half of the show. The running order for the semi-finals was decided through another draw on 23 March 2010 and as one of the five wildcard countries, Switzerland chose to perform in position 5, following the entry from Denmark and before the entry from Sweden.

In Switzerland, three broadcasters that form SRG SSR aired the contest. Sven Epiney provided German commentary for both semi-finals and the final airing on SF zwei. Jean-Marc Richard and Nicolas Tanner provided French commentary on TSR 2 for the second semi-final and the final. Sandy Altermatt provided Italian commentary for the second semi-final and the final on RSI La 1. The Swiss spokesperson, who announced the Swiss votes during the final, was Christa Rigozzi.

=== Semi-final ===
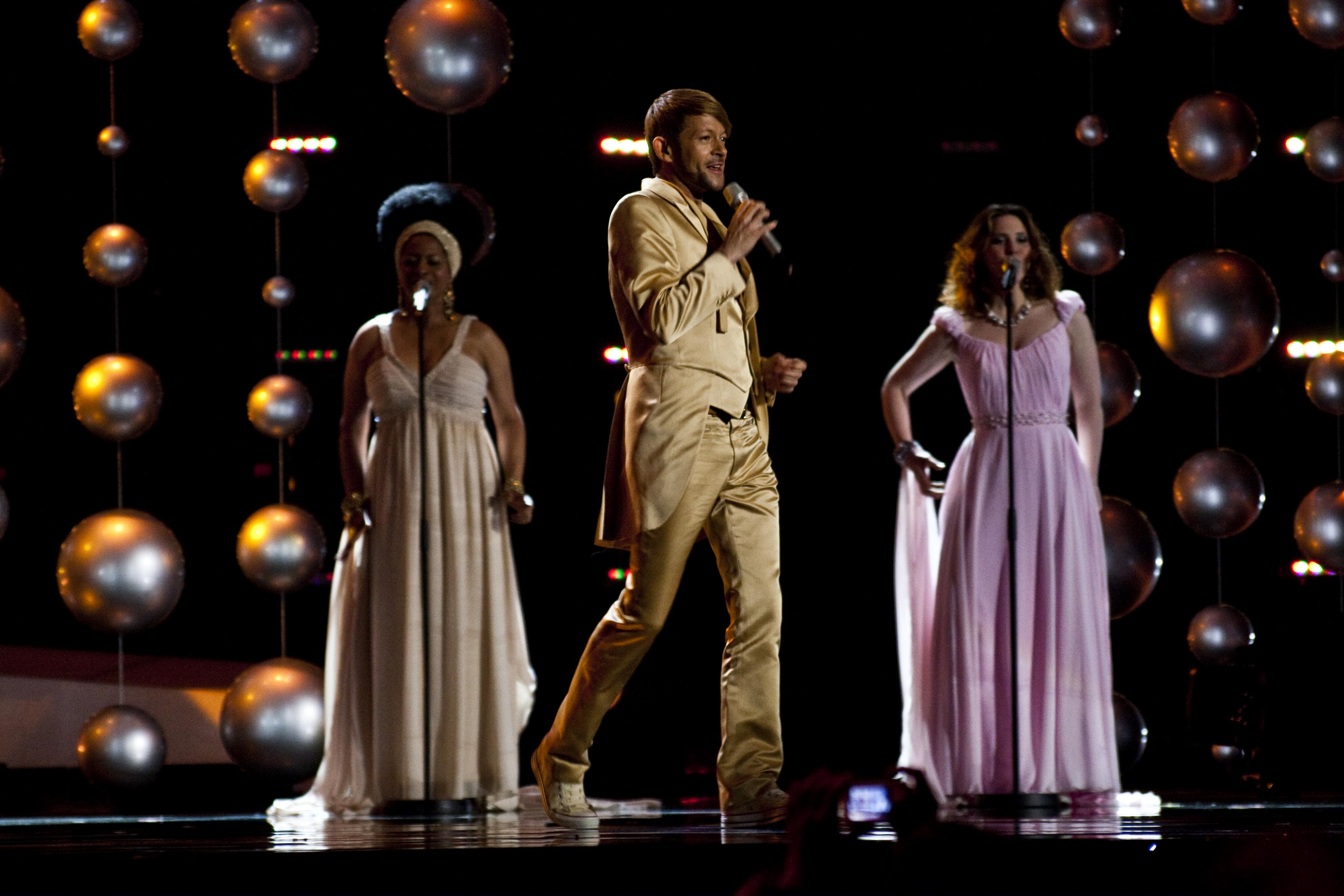
Michael von der Heide during a rehearsal before the second semi-final

Michael von der Heide took part in technical rehearsals on 18 and 21 May, followed by dress rehearsals on 26 and 27 May. This included the jury show on 26 May where the professional juries of each country watched and voted on the competing entries.

The Swiss performance featured Michael von der Heide performing on stage in a gold suit together with three female backing vocalists in pink, yellow and grey dresses and an additional male backing vocalist who also played the balalaika. Von der Heide and the female backing vocalists also wore long stripes of cloth attached to their hands. Silver balls and illuminated strips of light were used for parts of the stage and the performance featured several effects including pyrotechnics and flames. The three female backing vocalists that joined Michael von der Heide were: Amanda Nikolić, Freda Goodlett and Sybille Fässler, while the male backing performer was the co-composer of "Il pleut de l'or" Pele Loriano.

At the end of the show, Switzerland was not announced among the top 10 entries in the second semi-final and therefore failed to qualify to compete in the final. It was later revealed that Switzerland placed seventeenth (last) in the semi-final, receiving a total of 2 points.

=== Voting ===
Voting during the three shows consisted of 50 percent public televoting and 50 percent from a jury deliberation. The jury consisted of five music industry professionals who were citizens of the country they represent. This jury was asked to judge each contestant based on: vocal capacity; the stage performance; the song's composition and originality; and the overall impression by the act. In addition, no member of a national jury could be related in any way to any of the competing acts in such a way that they cannot vote impartially and independently.

Following the release of the full split voting by the EBU after the conclusion of the competition, it was revealed that Switzerland had placed seventeenth (last) with the public televote and sixteenth with the jury vote in the second semi-final. In the public vote, Switzerland scored 1 point, while with the jury vote, Switzerland scored 14 points.

Below is a breakdown of points awarded to Switzerland and awarded by Switzerland in the first semi-final and grand final of the contest. The nation awarded its 12 points to Ireland in the semi-final and to Germany in the final of the contest.

==== Points awarded to Switzerland ====
Points awarded to Switzerland (Semi-final 2)
Score	Country
12 points	
10 points	
8 points	
7 points	
6 points	
5 points	
4 points	
3 points	
2 points	Georgia
1 point	

==== Points awarded by Switzerland ====
Points awarded by Switzerland (Semi-final 2)
Score	Country
12 points	Ireland
10 points	Sweden
8 points	Turkey
7 points	Croatia
6 points	Azerbaijan
5 points	Denmark
4 points	Romania
3 points	Armenia
2 points	Netherlands
1 point	Georgia

Points awarded by Switzerland (Final)
Score	Country
12 points	Germany
10 points	Serbia
8 points	Albania
7 points	Belgium
6 points	Ireland
5 points	Portugal
4 points	Romania
3 points	Turkey
2 points	Azerbaijan
1 point	Georgia

== After Eurovision ==
Several Eurovision songs charted in the Swiss Music Charts. The winning song, Lena's "Satellite" for Germany, reached number one, having previously peaked at number 2 in April 2010. "Satellite" is the first Eurovision winning song to reach the top of the Swiss charts since 1982, with Nicole's "Ein bißchen Frieden", also for Germany.

Entries from Denmark, Azerbaijan, Belgium, Romania, Armenia, Turkey, Sweden, Iceland, Ukraine and the Swiss entry itself also charted. "Il pleut de l'or", which charted at #65, was Michael von der Heide's first ever song to chart on the Swiss singles chart after 12 years in the music business.
