= Croatia in the Eurovision Song Contest 2010 =

- Eurovision Song Contest 2010
- Participating broadcaster: Hrvatska radiotelevizija (HRT)
- Country: Croatia
- Selection process: Dora 2010
- Selection date: 6 March 2010

Competing entry
- Song: "Lako je sve"
- Artist: Feminnem
- Songwriters: Branimir Mihaljević; Pamela Ramljak; Neda Parmać

Placement
- Semi-final result: Failed to qualify (13th)

Participation chronology

Croatia was represented at the Eurovision Song Contest 2010 with the song "Lako je sve", written by Branimir Mihaljević, Pamela Ramljak and Neda Parmać, and performed by the group Feminnem. The Croatian participating broadcaster, Hrvatska radiotelevizija (HRT), organised the national final Dora 2010 to select its entry for the contest. A total of twenty-four entries competed in the national final which consisted of two shows: a semi-final and a final. In the semi-final on 5 March 2010, eight entries qualified to compete in the final on 6 March 2010 alongside eight pre-qualified songs. In the final, "Lako je sve" performed by Feminnem was selected as the winner following the combination of votes from a nine-member jury panel and a public televote. Feminnem had previously represented Bosnia and Herzegovina in 2005 where they placed fourteenth with the song "Call Me".

Croatia was drawn to compete in the second semi-final of the Eurovision Song Contest which took place on 27 May 2010. Performing during the show in position 15, "Lako je sve" was not announced among the top 10 entries of the second semi-final and therefore did not qualify to compete in the final. It was later revealed that Croatia placed thirteenth out of the 17 participating countries in the semi-final with 33 points.

== Background ==
Prior to the 2010 contest, Hrvatska radiotelevizija (HRT) had participated in the Eurovision Song Contest representing Croatia seventeen times since its first entry in 1993. Its best result in the contest was fourth, achieved on two occasions: in 1996 with the song "Sveta ljubav" performed by Maja Blagdan and in 1999 with the song "Marija Magdalena" performed by Doris Dragović. Following the introduction of semi-finals for the 2004, Croatia had thus far featured in five finals. In 2009, Igor Cukrov featuring Andrea and the song "Lijepa Tena" managed to qualify to the final.

As part of its duties as participating broadcaster, HRT organises the selection of its entry in the Eurovision Song Contest and broadcasts the event in the country. The broadcaster confirmed its participation in the 2010 contest on 27 October 2009. Since 1993, HRT organised the national final Dora in order to select its entry for the Eurovision Song Contest, a method that was continued for its 2010 participation.

== Before Eurovision ==
=== Dora 2010 ===
The logo of Dora 2010

Dora 2010 was the eighteenth edition of the Croatian national selection Dora which selected Croatia's entry for the Eurovision Song Contest 2010. The competition consisted of a semi-final and a final on 5 and 6 March 2010, both taking place at the Hotel Kvarner in Opatija and hosted by Nevena Rendeli, Mila Horvat, Mirko Fodor and Duško Ćurlić with Ida Prester and Iva Šulentić hosting segments from the green room. The semi-final was broadcast on HRT 2, while the final was broadcast on HRT 1. Both shows were also broadcast via radio on HR 2 and online via the broadcaster's website hrt.hr, while the final was also streamed online via the official Eurovision Song Contest website eurovision.tv.

==== Format ====
A total of twenty-four songs competed in Dora 2010 which consisted of two shows: a semi-final and a final. Sixteen of the songs were selected from open submissions and competed in the semi-final with public televoting selecting the top eight to proceed to the final. In the final, the eight qualifying songs in the semi-final alongside an additional eight pre-qualified songs competed and the winner was selected by votes from the public and a jury panel. Ties in the final were decided in favour of the entry that received the most points from the jury.

==== Competing entries ====
On 26 November 2009, HRT opened a submission period where artists and composers were able to submit their entries to the broadcaster with the deadline on 15 December 2009. 200 entries were received by the broadcaster during the submission period. A nine-member expert committee consisting of Elizabeth Homsi (HTV), Željen Klašterka (HTV), Aleksandar Kostadinov (HTV), Silvije Glojnarić (HRT), Robert Urlić (HR), Đurđica Ivanković (HR), Želimir Babogredac (HDS), Mišo Doležal (HDS) and Zvonimir Bučević (HGU) reviewed the received submissions and selected sixteen artists and songs for the semi-final of the competition, while the eight pre-qualifying songs for the final were written by composers invited by HRT in consultation with the Croatian Composers' Society (HDS). The composers also selected the performer for their entry. The invited composers were announced on 16 December 2009 and were:

- Alfi Kabiljo
- Ante Pecotić
- Boris Đurđević
- Denis Dumančić
- Luka Zima
- Miro Buljan
- Miroslav Škoro
- Neno Ninčević

HRT announced the entries competing in the semi-final on 29 December 2009 and among the artists was Feminnem which represented Bosnia and Herzegovina in the Eurovision Song Contest 2005. The pre-qualified entries competing in the final were announced on 8 January 2010. On 11 and 12 February 2010, the competing artists performed their entries live during the preview show Ususret dori broadcast on HRT 2.

Artist	Song	Songwriter(s)	Selection
AliBi	"Prvi pogled"	Boris Đurđević, Viktor Milaković, Dino Juratovac	Invited by HRT
Bety Belle	"Ne"	Ines Prajo, Arijana Kunštek	Open submission
Carla Belovari	"Sada osjećam to"	Alan Crnković, Alen Orlić	Open submission
Đani Stipaničev	"Nek nam bude lijepo"	Alfi Kabiljo	Invited by HRT
Doris Teur	"Ti me ne zaslužuješ"	Doris Teur	Open submission
Dražen Žanko	"Moja ljubav jedina"	Dražen Žanko, Nenad Ninčević	Open submission
Feminnem	"Lako je sve"	Branimir Mihaljević, Pamela Ramljak, Neda Parmać	Open submission
Filip Dizdar	"Sunce"	Aljoša Šerić	Open submission
Franka Batelić	"Na tvojim rukama"	Miro Buljan, Boris Đurđević, Neno Ninčević	Invited by HRT
Franko Krajcar and Indivia	"Jobrni je jobrni"	Franko Krajcar	Open submission
Giuliano	"Moja draga"	Duško Rapotec-Ute, Branko Berković, Boris Novković	Open submission
Klapa Iskon	"Vrime za kraj"	Matko Šimac	Open submission
Marta Kuliš	"Preporođena"	Luka Zima, Tomislav Erceg	Invited by HRT
Martina Vrbos	"Ti i ja"	Martina Vrbos	Open submission
Mijo Lešina	"Tajna ljubavi"	Mijo Lešina	Open submission
Nikola Marjanović	"Ti i muzika"	Lea Dekleva	Open submission
Rivers	"Bez tebe"	Tamara Obrovac, Anja Gasparini	Open submission
Sabrina	"Golu si me skinuo"	Ante Pecotić	Invited by HRT
Swing Mamas	"Trio tulipan"	Stefan Bravačić	Open submission
Teška industrija	"Nazovi stvari pravim imenom"	Denis Dumančić, Fayo	Open submission
Tihomir Kožina	"Za koga si se čuvala"	Denis Dumančić, Fayo	Invited by HRT
Valungari	"Vol or ne vol"	Zoran Preradović, Marko Kovačić	Open submission
Viva	"Zadnja kap života"	Nenad Ninčević, Miroslav Buljan	Invited by HRT
Žiga and ŽVS Druge	"Blagdani"	Miroslav Škoro	Invited by HRT

==== Semi-final ====
The semi-final took place on 5 March 2010. The eight qualifiers for the final were determined exclusively by a public televote. In addition to the performances of the competing entries, Putokazi performed as the interval act during the show.

Semi-final – 5 March 2010
R/O	Artist	Song	Televote	Place
1	Feminnem	"Lako je sve"	1,137	4
2	Mijo Lešina	"Tajna ljubavi"	218	15
3	Valungari	"Vol or ne vol"	679	6
4	Martina Vrbos	"Ti i ja"	492	9
5	Bety Belle	"Ne"	484	10
6	Teška industrija	"Nazovi stvari pravim imenom"	405	12
7	Nikola Marjanović	"Ti i muzika"	374	14
8	Klapa Iskon	"Vrime za kraj"	1,253	3
9	Carla Belovari	"Sada osjećam to"	576	8
10	Dražen Žanko	"Moja ljubav jedina"	378	13
11	Filip Dizdar	"Sunce"	458	11
12	Swing Mamas	"Trio tulipan"	625	7
13	Rivers	"Bez tebe"	169	16
14	Doris Teur	"Ti me ne zaslužuješ"	1,410	1
15	Franko Krajcar and Indivia	"Jobrni je jobrni"	1,396	2
16	Giuliano	"Moja draga"	689	5

==== Final ====
The final took place on 6 March 2010. The eight entries that qualified from the semi-final alongside the eight pre-qualified entries competed and the winner, "Lako je sve" performed by Feminnem, was determined by a 50/50 combination of votes from a nine-member jury panel and a public televote. The jury that voted in the final consisted of Elizabeth Homsi (HTV), Željen Klašterka (HTV), Aleksandar Kostadinov (HTV), Silvije Glojnarić (HRT), Robert Urlić (HR), Đurđica Ivanković (HR), Želimir Babogredac (HDS), Mišo Doležal (HDS) and Zvonimir Bučević (HGU). In addition to the performances of the competing entries, the show was opened by 2009 Croatian Eurovision entrant Igor Cukrov, while 1994 Croatian Eurovision entrant Tony Cetinski performed as the interval act.

Final – 6 March 2010
R/O	Artist	Song	Jury	Televote		Total	Place
R/O	Artist	Song	Jury	Votes	Points	Total	Place
1	Swing Mamas	"Trio tulipan"	8	872	6	14	11
2	Sabrina	"Golu si me skinuo"	5	481	3	8	14
3	Viva	"Zadnja kap života"	4	360	2	6	15
4	Marta Kuliš	"Preporođena"	1	91	1	2	16
5	Tihomir Kožina	"Za koga si se čuvala"	2	932	8	10	13
6	Carla Belovari	"Sada osjećam to"	10	693	4	14	10
7	Klapa Iskon	"Vrime za kraj"	8	2,967	14	22	6
8	AliBi	"Prvi pogled"	3	1,212	9	12	12
9	Đani Stipaničev	"Nek nam bude lijepo"	11	886	7	18	9
10	Doris Teur	"Ti me ne zaslužuješ"	12	2,060	11	23	4
11	Valungari	"Vol or ne vol"	14	1,794	10	24	3
12	Franka Batelić	"Na tvojim rukama"	9	2,063	12	21	7
13	Žiga and ŽVS Druge	"Blagdani"	8	3,472	15	23	5
14	Giuliano	"Moja draga"	13	772	5	18	8
15	Franko Krajcar and Indivia	"Jobrni je jobrni"	15	2,258	13	28	2
16	Feminnem	"Lako je sve"	16	3,578	16	32	1

Detailed Jury Votes
R/O	Song	Juror									Total	Points
R/O	Song	1	2	3	4	5	6	7	8	9	Total	Points
1	"Trio tulipan"	7	7	7	7	7	7	8	7	5	62	8
2	"Golu si me skinuo"	8	7	7	6	6	6	8	7	5	60	5
3	"Zadnja kap života"	5	6	6	6	6	7	6	6	5	53	4
4	"Preporođena"	4	6	6	6	6	6	6	5	2	47	1
5	"Za koga si se čuvala"	6	5	6	5	6	6	6	5	3	48	2
6	"Sada osjećam to"	7	7	7	7	7	7	8	7	7	64	10
7	"Vrime za kraj"	6	7	6	7	7	7	7	7	8	62	8
8	"Prvi pogled"	5	5	5	6	7	6	6	5	6	51	3
9	"Nek nam bude lijepo"	8	8	8	7	6	7	9	7	6	66	11
10	"Ti me ne zaslužuješ"	8	7	7	7	7	8	8	8	7	67	12
11	"Vol or ne vol"	10	9	9	10	8	10	7	9	8	80	14
12	"Na tvojim rukama"	6	8	8	9	7	7	8	5	5	63	9
13	"Blagdani"	8	8	7	7	7	7	6	5	7	62	8
14	"Moja draga"	8	8	8	9	7	8	7	8	8	71	13
15	"Jobrni je jobrni"	10	9	9	10	8	10	8	9	9	82	15
16	"Lako je sve"	9	9	10	10	10	10	10	8	10	86	16

=== Preparation ===
In late March, Feminnem filmed the music video for "Lako je sve", which was directed by Radislav Jovanov Gonzo with outfits designed by Gordana Zucić. The music video was presented on 20 March following the HRT news programme Dnevnik. Russian, Italian and English versions of the song were also recorded entitled "Ljehko vsjo", "Semplice" and "Easy to See", respectively.

=== Promotion ===
Feminnem specifically promoted "Lako je sve" as the Croatian Eurovision entry on 14 March 2010 by performing during the presentation show of the 2010 Bosnian Eurovision entry, BH Eurosong Show 2010.

== At Eurovision ==
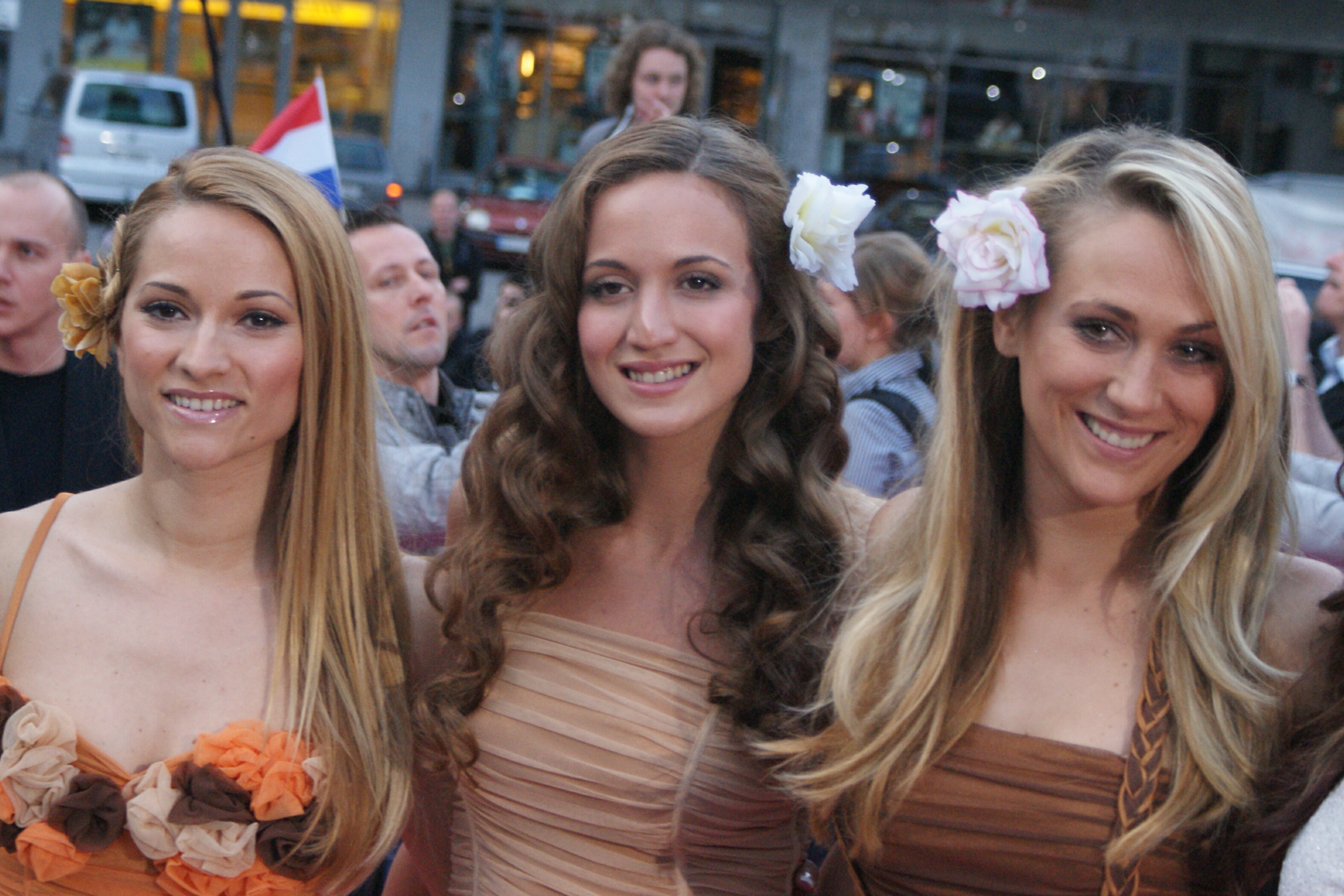
Feminnem at the Eurovision Opening Party in Oslo

According to Eurovision rules, all nations with the exceptions of the host country and the "Big Four" (France, Germany, Spain and the United Kingdom) were required to qualify from one of two semi-finals in order to compete for the final; the top ten countries from each semi-final progress to the final. The European Broadcasting Union (EBU) split up the competing countries into six different pots based on voting patterns from previous contests, with countries with favourable voting histories put into the same pot. On 7 February 2010, a special allocation draw was held which placed each country into one of the two semi-finals, as well as which half of the show they would perform in. Croatia was placed into the second semi-final, to be held on 27 May 2010, and was scheduled to perform in the second half of the show. The running order for the semi-finals was decided through another draw on 23 March 2010 and Croatia was set to perform in position 15, following the entry from Cyprus and before the entry from Georgia.

The two semi-finals and the final were broadcast in Croatia on HRT with commentary by Duško Ćurlić. The Croatian spokesperson, who announced the Croatian votes during the final, was Mila Horvat.

=== Semi-final ===
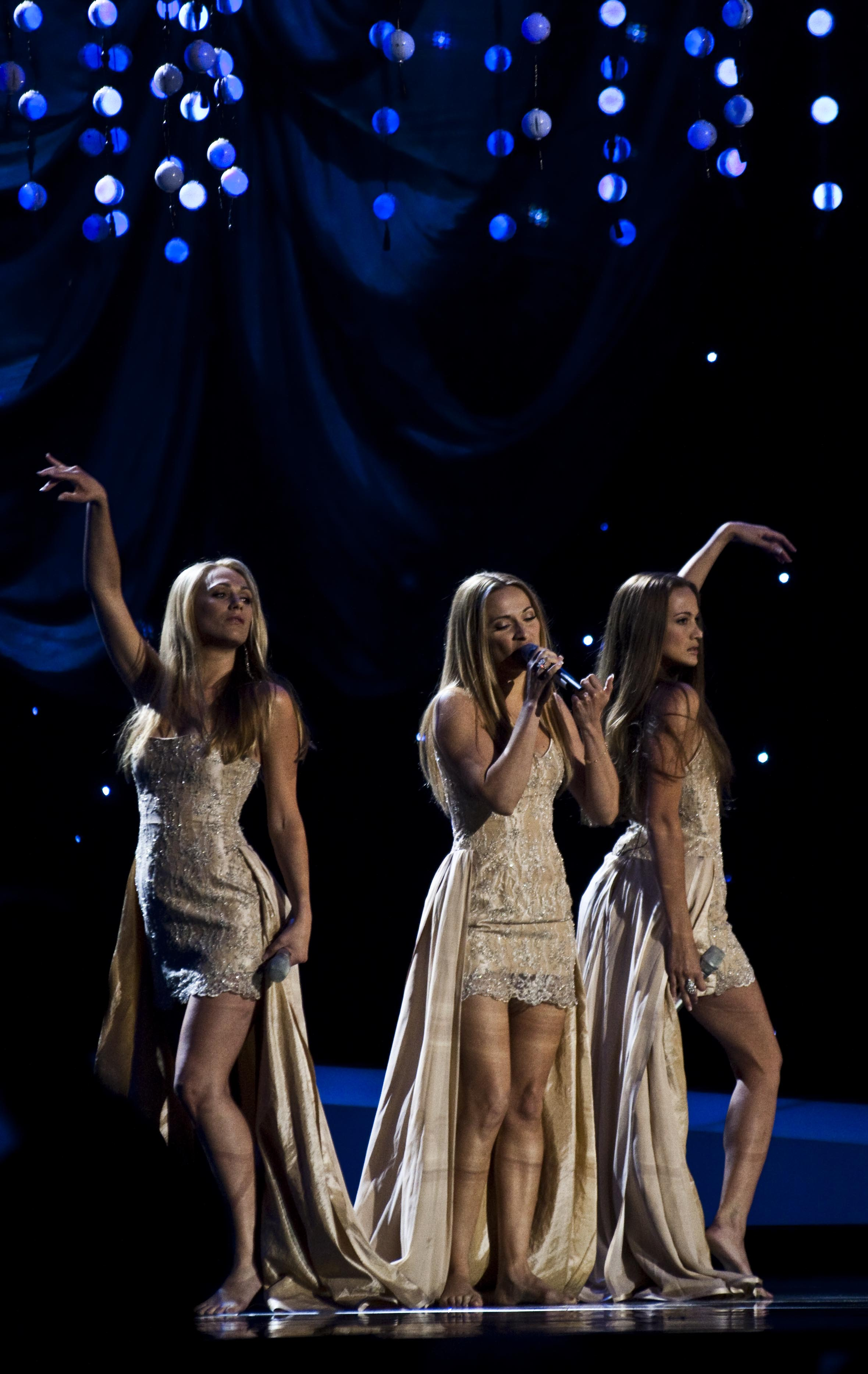
Feminnem during a rehearsal before the second semi-final

Feminnem took part in technical rehearsals on 19 and 23 May, followed by dress rehearsals on 26 and 27 May. This included the jury show on 26 May where the professional juries of each country watched and voted on the competing entries.

The Croatian performance featured the members of Feminnem in cream-coloured dresses, joined on stage by two dancers dressed in black catsuits. The group began the performance on a bench in the back of the stage before moving to the front to do a dance routine. At the end of the performance, a huge red heart-shaped prop was displayed at the front of the stage with the members of Feminnem in the centre of it while the dancers threw flowers over them. The stage lighting was predominantly dark with blue and red elements, while blue drapes and a wind machine were also used. The two dancers that joined Feminnem were Irma and Lydia Iveković.

At the end of the show, Croatia was not announced among the top 10 entries in the second semi-final and therefore failed to qualify to compete in the final. It was later revealed that Croatia placed thirteenth in the semi-final, receiving a total of 33 points.

=== Voting ===
Voting during the three shows consisted of 50 percent public televoting and 50 percent from a jury deliberation. The jury consisted of five music industry professionals who were citizens of the country they represent. This jury was asked to judge each contestant based on: vocal capacity; the stage performance; the song's composition and originality; and the overall impression by the act. In addition, no member of a national jury could be related in any way to any of the competing acts in such a way that they cannot vote impartially and independently.

Following the release of the full split voting by the EBU after the conclusion of the competition, it was revealed that the Croatia had placed fourteenth with the public televote and twelfth with the jury vote in the second semi-final. In the public vote, Croatia scored 22 points, while with the jury vote, Croatia scored 54 points.

Below is a breakdown of points awarded to Croatia and awarded by Croatia in the second semi-final and grand final of the contest. The nation awarded its 12 points to Cyprus in the semi-final and to Turkey in the final of the contest.

==== Points awarded to Croatia ====
Points awarded to Croatia (Semi-final 2)
Score	Country
12 points	Slovenia
10 points	
8 points	
7 points	Armenia; Switzerland
6 points	
5 points	
4 points	
3 points	Bulgaria
2 points	Denmark
1 point	Azerbaijan; Ireland

==== Points awarded by Croatia ====
Points awarded by Croatia (Semi-final 2)
Score	Country
12 points	Cyprus
10 points	Azerbaijan
8 points	Turkey
7 points	Georgia
6 points	Ukraine
5 points	Slovenia
4 points	Denmark
3 points	Ireland
2 points	Sweden
1 point	Lithuania

Points awarded by Croatia (Final)
Score	Country
12 points	Turkey
10 points	Bosnia and Herzegovina
8 points	Serbia
7 points	Georgia
6 points	Germany
5 points	Albania
4 points	Cyprus
3 points	France
2 points	Denmark
1 point	Ireland
