= Eurovision Song Contest 2010 =

International song competition

Coordinates: 59°56′00″N 10°45′23″E

- Share the Moment

Dates and venue
- Semi-final 1: 25 May 2010
- Semi-final 2: 27 May 2010
- Final: 29 May 2010
- Venue: Telenor Arena; Bærum, Norway

Organisation
- Organiser: European Broadcasting Union (EBU)
- Executive supervisor: Svante Stockselius

Production
- Host broadcaster: Norsk rikskringkasting (NRK)
- Directors: Ole Jørgen Grønlund; Kim Strømstad
- Executive producer: Jon Ola Sand
- Presenters: Erik Solbakken; Haddy N'jie; Nadia Hasnaoui

Participants
- Number of entries: 39
- Number of finalists: 25
- Returning countries: Georgia
- Non-returning countries: Andorra; Czech Republic; Hungary; Montenegro
- Participation map: Finalist countries Countries eliminated in the semi-finals Countries that participated in the past but not in 2010

Vote
- Voting system: Each country awarded 12, 10, 8–1 points to their 10 favourite songs.
- Winning song: Germany; "Satellite"

The Eurovision Song Contest 2010 was the 55th edition of the Eurovision Song Contest. It consisted of two semi-finals on 25 and 27 May and a final on 29 May 2010, held at the Telenor Arena in Oslo, Norway, and presented by Erik Solbakken, Nadia Hasnaoui, and Haddy N'jie. It was organised by the European Broadcasting Union (EBU) and host broadcaster Norsk rikskringkasting (NRK), which staged the event after winning the 2009 contest for Norway with the song "Fairytale" by Alexander Rybak. It was the contest hosted the latest, tying with the 1999 edition.

Broadcasters from thirty-nine countries took part in the contest, with Georgia returning after a one-year absence. Meanwhile, Andorra, the Czech Republic, Hungary, and Montenegro ceased their participation, mainly due to the 2008 financial crisis. Lithuania originally announced its non-participation, but was later confirmed as among the participants by the EBU.

The winner was Germany with the song "Satellite", performed by Lena and written by Julie Frost and John Gordon. The song won both the jury vote and televote and was Germany's second victory in the contest, following 1982. It was also its first win as a unified country, and the first win for one of the "Big Four" countries since the rule's introduction in 2000. Turkey, Romania, Denmark, and Azerbaijan rounded out the top five. Romania, finishing third, equalled its best result from 2005, while further down the table, Georgia achieved its best result to date, finishing ninth. For the first time since the introduction of semi-finals in 2004, Sweden failed to qualify for the final.

Prior to the contest, the EBU announced that the voting system used in the semi-finals would change from previous years to balance jury voting with televoting. A return of accompaniment by orchestra was also proposed, but ultimately did not occur. The 2008 financial crisis affected how the contest was run, with NRK being forced to sell its broadcasting rights for the 2010 FIFA World Cup to TV 2 and Viasat in order to finance the event.

== Location ==
=== Venue ===
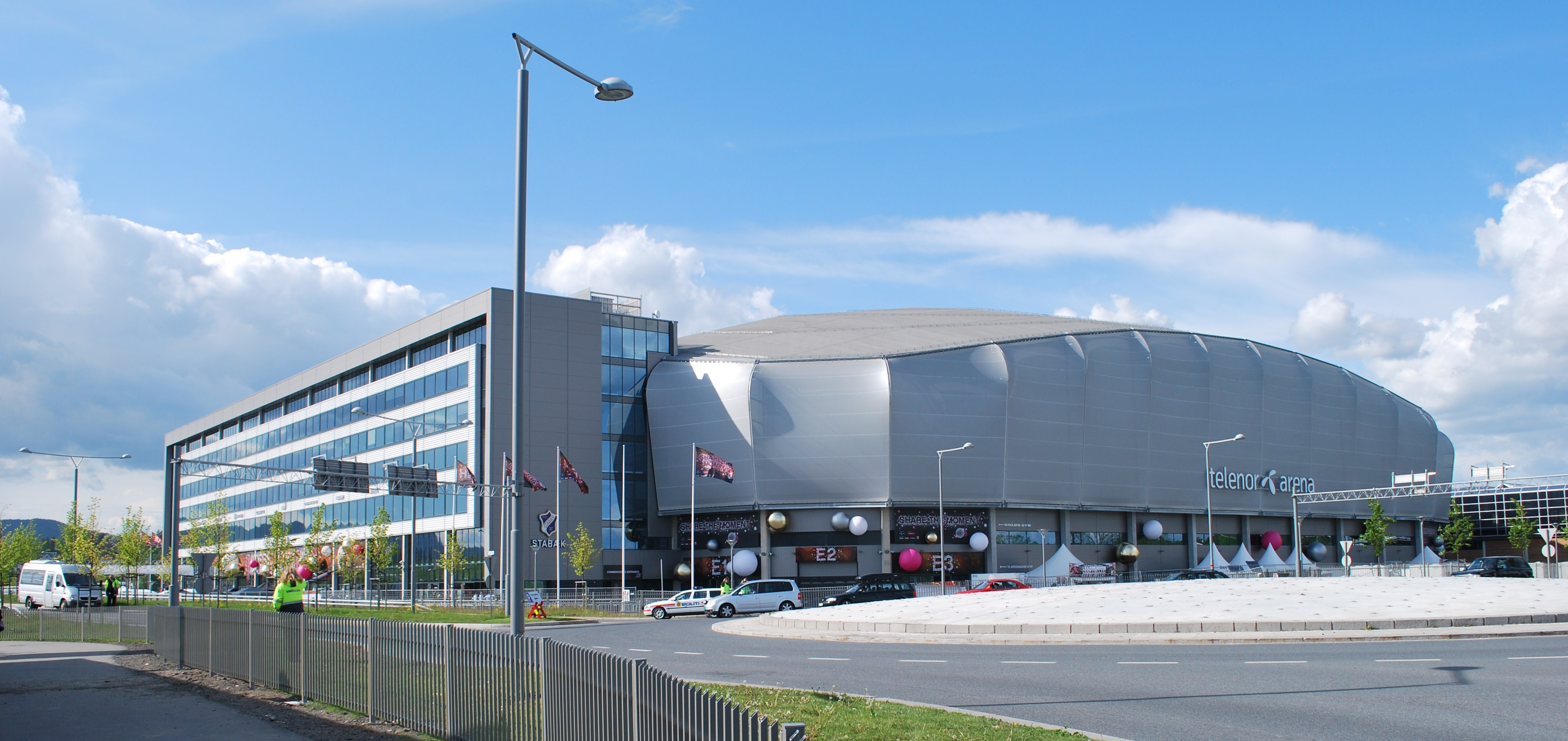
Telenor Arena, Oslo – host venue of the 2010 contest.

150 million Norwegian kroner (€17 million) was originally the venue budget agreed upon by Trond Giske and Hans-Tore Bjerkaas, respectively the Norwegian Minister for Culture and the head of Norsk rikskringkasting (NRK).

At a press conference in Oslo on 27 May 2009, it was announced that the show was to be held in the Oslo metropolitan area. NRK argued that Oslo was the only city with the required capacity, venues, and infrastructure to hold the show. On 3 July 2009, it was decided that the venue would be the newly constructed Telenor Arena, in the municipality of Bærum neighbouring Oslo.

The Oslo Spektrum (host venue in 1996) was ruled out to host the contest due to its smaller size and capacity, as was Vallhall Arena in Oslo and the Vikingskipet in Hamar. NRK had decided they wanted to take the contest back to the basics and after the contest in 2009, where LEDs were widely used, they used none. The 2010 was also produced on a considerably lower budget than the year before.

== Participants ==
Eurovision Song Contest 2010 – Participation summaries by country
- Albania; Armenia; Azerbaijan; Belarus; Belgium; Bosnia and Herzegovina; Bulgaria; Croatia; Cyprus; Denmark; Estonia; Finland; France; Georgia; Germany; Greece; Iceland; Ireland; Israel; Latvia; Lithuania; Macedonia; Malta; Moldova; Netherlands; Norway; Poland; Portugal; Romania; Russia; Serbia; Slovakia; Slovenia; Spain; Sweden; Switzerland; Turkey; Ukraine; United Kingdom

A total of 39 countries confirmed their participation for the Eurovision Song Contest 2010, including Georgia, which returned to the contest after its absence in 2009.

The Lithuanian National Radio and Television (LRT) initially announced its non-participation after failing to achieve the necessary funds of 300,000 litas (€90,000) for participation. The EBU later confirmed that Lithuania would indeed participate in Oslo. Funding was eventually given by Lithuanian company Teo LT, which allowed LRT to participate.

Several of the performing artists had previously represented the same country in past editions. Niamh Kavanagh had won the contest for Ireland in 1993. Hera Björk had provided backing vocals for Iceland in 2008 and in 2009. Kristján Gíslason, backing singer for Hera Björk, had represented Iceland in 2001 as member of Two Tricky. In addition, Feminnem representing Croatia, had represented Bosnia and Herzegovina in 2005.

Moldova was represented by the group SunStroke Project, of which saxophonist Sergey Stepanov became an Internet meme as the "Epic Sax Guy", after performing their entry "Run Away" at the final of the contest.

Eurovision Song Contest 2010 participants
Country	Broadcaster	Artist	Song	Language	Songwriter(s)
Albania	RTSH	Juliana Pasha	"It's All About You"	English	Pirro Çako; Ardit Gjebrea
Armenia	AMPTV	Eva Rivas	"Apricot Stone"	English	Karen Kavaleryan; Armen Martirosyan
Azerbaijan	İTV	Safura	"Drip Drop"	English	Anders Bagge; Sandra Bjurman; Stefan Örn
Belarus	BTRC	3+2 feat. Robert Wells	"Butterflies"	English	Malka Chaplin; Maxim Fadeev
Belgium	VRT	Tom Dice	"Me and My Guitar"	English	Tom Dice; Ashley Hicklin; Jeroen Swinnen
Bosnia and Herzegovina	BHRT	Vukašin Brajić	"Thunder and Lightning"	English	Dino Šaran
Bulgaria	BNT	Miro	"Angel si ti" (Ангел си ти)	Bulgarian, English	Gordon Davis; Miroslav Kostadinov; Mihail Mihailov
Croatia	HRT	Feminnem	"Lako je sve"	Croatian	Branimir Mihaljević; Neda Parmać; Pamela Ramljak
Cyprus	CyBC	Jon Lilygreen and the Islanders	"Life Looks Better in Spring"	English	Melis Konstantinou; Nasos Lambrianides
Denmark	DR	Chanée and N'evergreen	"In a Moment like This"	English	Erik Bernholm; Thomas G:son; Henrik Sethsson
Estonia	ERR	Malcolm Lincoln	"Siren"	English	Robin Juhkental
Finland	YLE	Kuunkuiskaajat	"Työlki ellää"	Finnish (Note: Specifically the Karelian dialect. Karelian is nowadays considered a separate language.)	Timo Kiiskinen
France	France Télévisions	Jessy Matador	"Allez Ola Olé"	French	Jacques Ballue; Hugues Ducamin
Georgia	GPB	Sofia Nizharadze	"Shine"	English	Christian Leuzzi; Harry Sommerdahl; Hanne Sørvaag
Germany	NDR (Note: On behalf of the German public broadcasting consortium ARD)	Lena	"Satellite"	English	Julie Frost; John Gordon
Greece	ERT	Giorgos Alkaios and Friends	"Opa" (Ώπα)	Greek	Giorgos Alkaios; Giannis Antoniou and Friends
Iceland	RÚV	Hera Björk	"Je ne sais quoi"	English, French	Hera Björk; Örlygur Smári
Ireland	RTÉ	Niamh Kavanagh	"It's for You"	English	Lina Eriksson; Mårten Eriksson; Jonas Gladnikoff; Niall Mooney
Israel	IBA	Harel Skaat	"Milim" (מילים)	Hebrew	Tomer Adaddi; Noam Horev
Latvia	LTV	Aisha	"What For?"	English	Jānis Lūsēns; Guntars Račs
Lithuania	LRT	InCulto	"Eastern European Funk"	English	InCulto
Macedonia	MRT	Gjoko Taneski (Note: Performance contains uncredited live vocals from Billy Zver)	"Jas ja imam silata" (Јас ја имам силата)	Macedonian	Kristijan Gabrovski
Malta	PBS	Thea Garrett	"My Dream"	English	Sunny Aquilina; Jason Cassar
Moldova	TRM	SunStroke Project and Olia Tira	"Run Away"	English	Alina Galetskaya; Anton Ragoza; Sergey Stepanov
Netherlands	TROS	Sieneke	"Ik ben verliefd (Sha-la-lie)"	Dutch	Pierre Kartner
Norway	NRK	Didrik Solli-Tangen	"My Heart Is Yours"	English	Fredrik Kempe; Hanne Sørvaag
Poland	TVP	Marcin Mroziński	"Legenda"	English, Polish	Marcin Mroziński; Marcin Nierubiec
Portugal	RTP	Filipa Azevedo	"Há dias assim"	Portuguese	Augusto Madureira
Romania	TVR	Paula Seling and Ovi	"Playing with Fire"	English	Ovidiu Cernăuțeanu
Russia	RTR	Peter Nalitch and Friends	"Lost and Forgotten"	English	Peter Nalitch
Serbia	RTS	Milan Stanković	"Ovo je Balkan" (Oво je Балкан)	Serbian	Goran Bregović; Ljiljana Jorgovanović; Marina Tucaković
Slovakia	STV	Kristína	"Horehronie"	Slovak	Martin Kavulič; Kamil Peteraj
Slovenia	RTVSLO	Ansambel Žlindra and Kalamari	"Narodnozabavni rock"	Slovene	Marino Legovič; Leon Oblak
Spain	RTVE	Daniel Diges	"Algo pequeñito"	Spanish	Jesús Cañadilla; Daniel Diges; Alberto Jodar; Luis Miguel de la Varga
Sweden	SVT	Anna Bergendahl	"This Is My Life"	English	Kristian Lagerström; Bobby Ljunggren
Switzerland	SRG SSR	Michael von der Heide	"Il pleut de l'or"	French	André Grüter; Michael von der Heide; Heike Kospach; Pele Loriano
Turkey	TRT	Manga	"We Could Be the Same"	English	Manga; Fiona Movery Akıncı; Evren Özdemir
Ukraine	NTU	Alyosha	"Sweet People"	English	Borys Kukoba; Olena Kucher; Vadim Lisitsa
United Kingdom	BBC	Josh Dubovie	"That Sounds Good to Me"	English	Steve Crosby; Mike Stock; Pete Waterman

=== Other countries ===
==== Active EBU members ====
The EBU announced that they would work harder to bring back Austria, Italy, and Monaco to the 2010 contest. In September 2009 the EBU's director Bjørn Erichsen stated during an EBU press conference that "Austria [would] be back", and that the EBU "[had] reasons to believe that Luxembourg and Monaco" were also to participate; "now we are only missing Italy". In late October 2009, the 2010 contest project manager Jon Ola Sand stated that "countries such as Monaco and Luxembourg [had] indicated that they [wished] to participate in next year's competition in Norway". However, the representatives of the broadcasters of Austria, Monaco, and Luxembourg denied participation in the 2010 contest. Wolfgang Lorenz, the programme director of the Austrian broadcaster Österreichischer Rundfunk (ORF), informed that they would not take part stating that the contest had been "ruined by the regulations". Télé Monte Carlo (TMC) also declared that they would not be returning for the 2010 edition, mainly due to a lack of finances to send a Monegasque entry. The RTL Group announced that they were having serious discussions regarding a possible comeback for Luxembourg for the first time since 1993, but later confirmed that they would not be present for the 2010 contest either. Radiotelevisione della Repubblica di San Marino (SMRTV) also considered returning in 2010 for San Marino; however, after deliberations with Italian artists, including Italian sister duo Paola & Chiara, they informed to withhold returning after failing to receive funding from the Sammarinnese parliament or sponsors.

EBU had talks to Liechtenstein's only broadcaster 1FLTV for them to join the EBU, and become a part of the Eurovision Song Contest. 1FLTV's programme director Peter Kölbel had confirmed interest in their participation as soon as full EBU membership is granted, which may have happened in December 2009. Thus they were getting ready to debut in 2010, considering a national final concept similar to the German version of the Idol series – Deutschland sucht den Superstar (DSDS). In November 1FLTV decided against applying for EBU membership in December for financial reasons, ruling out a debut at the 2010 contest.

From July to December 2009, four countries who participated in the 2009 contest announced their non-participation in 2010: Andorra, the Czech Republic, Hungary, and Montenegro.

== Format ==
=== Visual design ===
Screenshot from the rehearsals where the design can be seen

NRK announced the theme art, slogan and design for the contest on 4 December 2009, during the Host City Insignia Exchange between the Mayors of Moscow, Oslo and Bærum, marking the official kick-off of the Eurovision Song Contest 2010 season. The theme art, a series of intersecting circles, was selected to "represent gathering people and the diversity of emotions surrounding the Eurovision Song Contest." In addition to the base colour of white, the logo was created in black, gold, and pink. A preview of the stage design was released on 6 May 2010, featuring no LED screens, opting instead for various other lighting techniques.

=== Postcards ===
Unlike the 2009 and the 2008 postcards, the 2010 postcards were based in simplicity but also included an innovative idea, they are shown like they could be seen right in the venue, over the crowd's heads.

The basic synopsis of the postcards is a numerous group of little golden balls (the theme of the ESC 2010) forms the shape of each country. Then, they move and form a screen where we can see a pre-recorded video of a little crowd from in a city of the country (usually the capital) about to perform supporting and cheering their act. After that, a few seconds of the performer of the country getting ready in the stage are shown; and then, the balls form the flag of the country supported.

In the part of the shape of the country, there were little discrepancies: some countries' shapes, such as those for Serbia, Israel, Armenia, and Azerbaijan, were not completely shown, due to territorial or border disputes in those areas.

=== Presenters ===
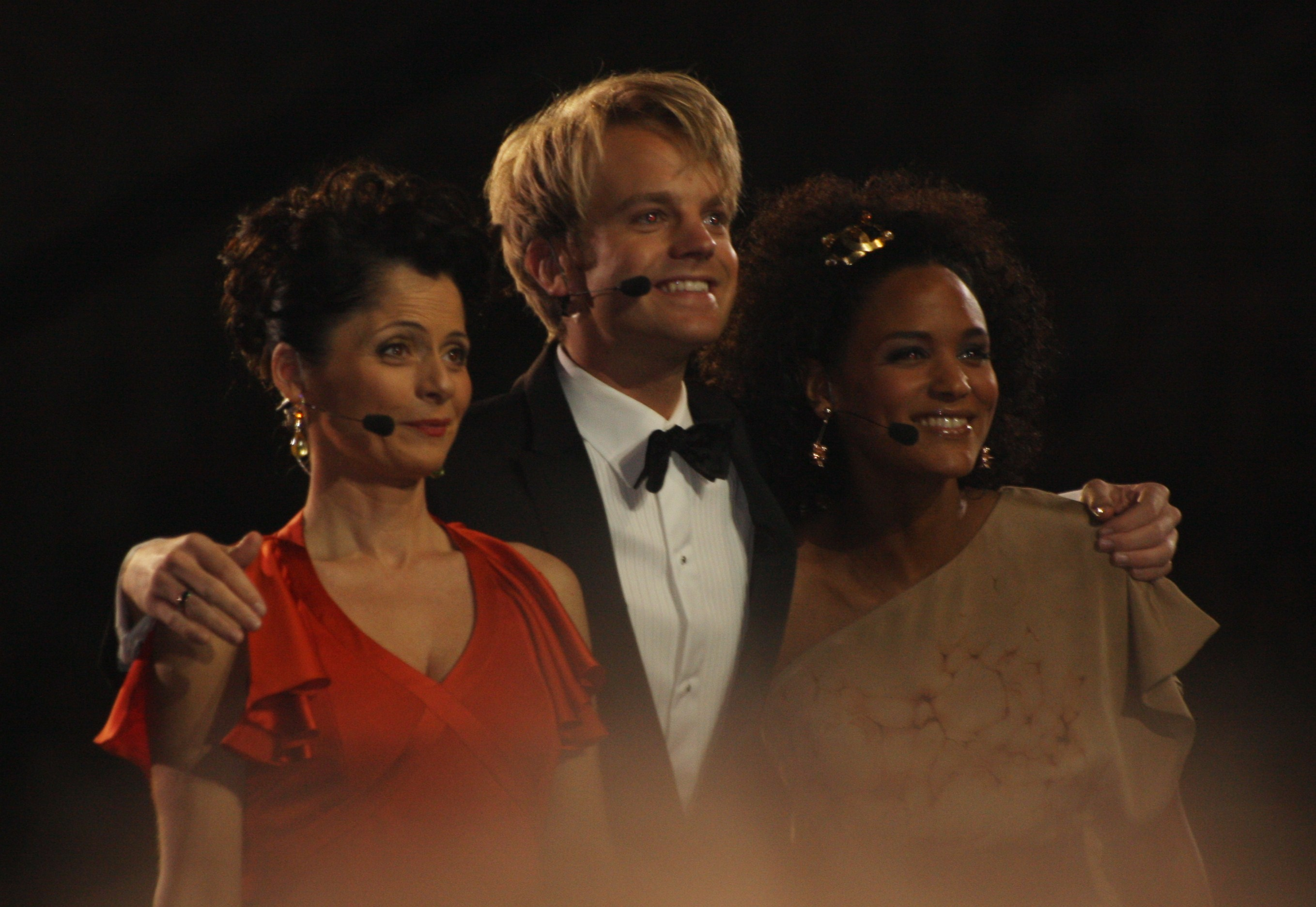
Presenters of the 2010 contest, from left to right – Nadia Hasnaoui, Erik Solbakken and Haddy Jatou N'jie.

NRK announced the hosts of the contest on 10 March 2010. Those chosen were Erik Solbakken, Haddy Jatou N'jie, and Nadia Hasnaoui. Solbakken and N'jie opened the three shows, introduced the artists, and reported from the green room during the voting, with Hasnaoui presenting the voting section and scoreboard announcements. This was the second Eurovision event that Hasnaoui had co-hosted, after doing so at the Junior Eurovision Song Contest 2004, in Lillehammer. The trio guided the audience and viewers through the night in English, French, and Norwegian. This was the second time that more than two hosts were presenting the shows, after the 1999 contest.

=== Voting system ===
On 11 October 2009, the EBU announced that the format of the semi-finals was to be changed so that the results would be determined by a combination of 50% national jury and 50% televoting, making it more consistent with the final. Each country's votes were determined by combining the jury votes and the televoting results; the countries with the top ten highest points in each semi-final then qualify to participate in the final of the contest. This replaces the semi-final format used in the 2008 and 2009 contests in which the countries with the top nine highest points from the televoting results in each semi-final qualified for the final. The tenth semi-final place was then given to the country with the highest number of points from the jury's votes which had not already qualified for the final from the televoting results. On 26 October 2009, the EBU announced that the voting would be open throughout the competition and would conclude 15 minutes after the end of the very last song.

=== Possible return of the orchestra ===
A number of fans began a campaign on social networking site Facebook for the return of an orchestra to the contest in Oslo, for the first time since 1998. An orchestra, which had been used since the first contest in 1956, was dropped after the 1998 contest due to rapid developments in music technology, which made backing tracks more useful. Jan Fredrik Heyerdahl of the Norwegian Radio Orchestra said that they were interested in participating in the 2010 contest if the EBU and NRK approved the return of an orchestra. However, no such change to the contest had been approved.

=== Semi-final allocation draw ===
Results of the semi-final allocation draw Participating countries in the first semi-final Pre-qualified for the final but also voting in the first semi-final Participating countries in the second semi-final Pre-qualified for the final but also voting in the second semi-final

On Sunday 7 February 2010, the draw to decide which countries were to appear in either the first or second semi-final took place. The participating countries excluding the automatic finalists (France, Germany, Norway, Spain, and the United Kingdom) were split into six pots, based upon how those countries had been voting. From these pots, half (or as close to half as is possible) competed in the first Semi Final on 25 May 2010. The other half in that particular pot will compete in the second Semi Final on 27 May 2010. This draw also doubled up as an approximate running order, in order for the delegations from the countries to know when their rehearsals commenced. The draw also determined in which Semi Final the automatic finalists voted in. The draw for the running order of the semi-finals, finals, and the order of voting, took place on 23 March 2010.

Pot 1	Pot 2	Pot 3	Pot 4	Pot 5
Albania; Bosnia and Herzegovina; Croatia; Macedonia; Serbia; Slovenia; Switzerland	Denmark; Estonia; Finland; Iceland; Latvia; Lithuania; Sweden	Azerbaijan; Belarus; Georgia; Israel; Moldova; Russia; Ukraine	Armenia; Belgium; Cyprus; Greece; Malta; Netherlands; Turkey	Bulgaria; Ireland; Poland; Portugal; Romania; Slovakia

== Contest overview ==
=== Semi-final 1 ===
The first semi-final took place on 25 May 2010 at 21:00 CEST. All the countries competing in this semi-final were eligible to vote, plus France, Germany, and Spain. The ten countries in this semi-final with the highest scoring points, according to a combination of televotes and jury votes from each voting country, qualified for the final.

Qualifiers

Results of the first semi-final of the Eurovision Song Contest 2010
R/O	Country	Artist	Song	Points	Place
1	Moldova	SunStroke Project and Olia Tira	"Run Away"	52	10
2	Russia	Peter Nalitch and Friends	"Lost and Forgotten"	74	7
3	Estonia	Malcolm Lincoln	"Siren"	39	14
4	Slovakia	Kristína	"Horehronie"	24	16
5	Finland	Kuunkuiskaajat	"Työlki ellää"	49	11
6	Latvia	Aisha	"What For?"	11	17
7	Serbia	Milan Stanković	"Ovo je Balkan"	79	5
8	Bosnia and Herzegovina	Vukašin Brajić	"Thunder and Lightning"	59	8
9	Poland	Marcin Mroziński	"Legenda"	44	13
10	Belgium	Tom Dice	"Me and My Guitar"	167	1
11	Malta	Thea Garrett	"My Dream"	45	12
12	Albania	Juliana Pasha	"It's All About You"	76	6
13	Greece	Giorgos Alkaios and Friends	"Opa"	133	2
14	Portugal	Filipa Azevedo	"Há dias assim"	89	4
15	Macedonia	Gjoko Taneski	"Jas ja imam silata"	37	15
16	Belarus	3+2 feat. Robert Wells	"Butterflies"	59	9
17	Iceland	Hera Björk	"Je ne sais quoi"	123	3

=== Semi-final 2 ===
The second semi-final took place on 27 May 2010 21:00 CEST. All the countries competing in this semi-final were eligible to vote, Norway and the United Kingdom. The ten countries in this semi-final with the highest scoring points, according to a combination of televotes and jury votes from each voting country, qualified for the final.

Qualifiers

Results of the second semi-final of the Eurovision Song Contest 2010
R/O	Country	Artist	Song	Points	Place
1	Lithuania	InCulto	"Eastern European Funk"	44	12
2	Armenia	Eva Rivas	"Apricot Stone"	83	6
3	Israel	Harel Skaat	"Milim"	71	8
4	Denmark	Chanée and N'evergreen	"In a Moment like This"	101	5
5	Switzerland	Michael von der Heide	"Il pleut de l'or"	2	17
6	Sweden	Anna Bergendahl	"This Is My Life"	62	11
7	Azerbaijan	Safura	"Drip Drop"	113	2
8	Ukraine	Alyosha	"Sweet People"	77	7
9	Netherlands	Sieneke	"Ik ben verliefd (Sha-la-lie)"	29	14
10	Romania	Paula Seling and Ovi	"Playing with Fire"	104	4
11	Slovenia	Ansambel Žlindra and Kalamari	"Narodnozabavni rock"	6	16
12	Ireland	Niamh Kavanagh	"It's for You"	67	9
13	Bulgaria	Miro	"Angel si ti"	19	15
14	Cyprus	Jon Lilygreen and the Islanders	"Life Looks Better in Spring"	67	10
15	Croatia	Feminnem	"Lako je sve"	33	13
16	Georgia	Sofia Nizharadze	"Shine"	106	3
17	Turkey	Manga	"We Could Be the Same"	118	1

=== Final ===
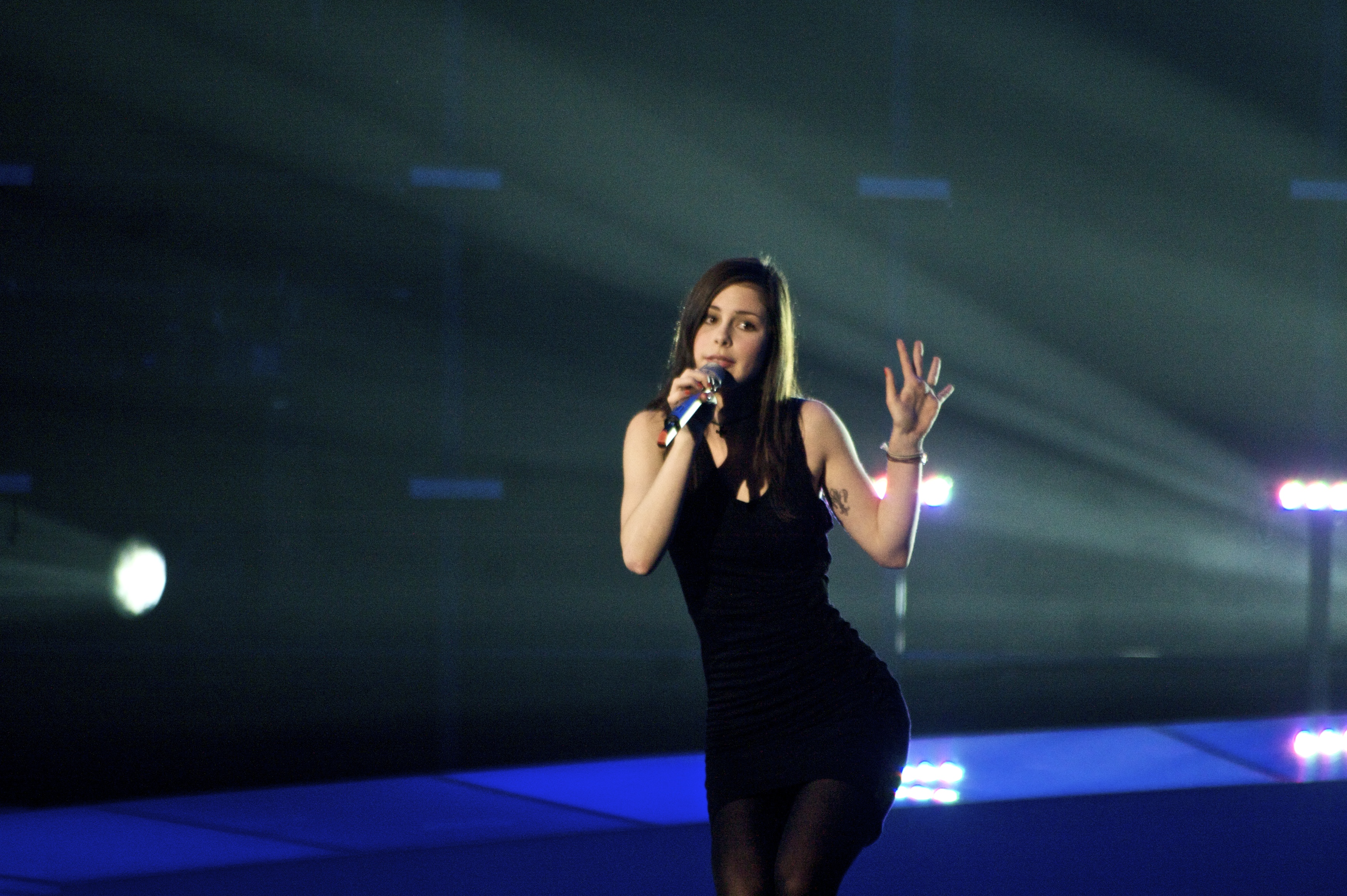
Lena performing the winning entry, "Satellite," for Germany.

The final took place on 29 May 2010 at 21:00 CEST and was won by Germany. The "Big Four" and the host country, Norway, qualified directly for the final. From the two semi-finals on 25 and 27 May 2010, twenty countries qualified for the final. A total of 25 countries competed in the final and all 39 participants voted. The voting system used was similar to that used in the 2009 contest (with a combination of televotes and jury votes), but viewers were able to vote during the performances; the voting window ended 15 minutes after the conclusion of the songs.

The interval act involved a number of live public outdoor dance events from across Europe, which were planned for promotional purposes, but done in the style of a series of spontaneous flashmobs. The outdoor footage was intercut with webcam footage from individual private households. Peter Svaar, Head of Press for the contest on behalf of broadcaster NRK, said: "We want to share the Eurovision Song Contest, rather than just broadcast it." The seven and a half minute long song "Glow", was produced and co-written by the Element team and performed and co-written by Madcon.

The performance of "Algo pequeñito" by Daniel Diges, representing Spain, was disrupted by Catalan pitch invader Jaume Marquet, also known as Jimmy Jump. The performance continued as Marquet, wearing a barretina, joined in with the choreographed routine, but he ran off when security personnel appeared on the stage. Spain was subsequently allowed to perform their song a second time after Denmark's entry – the 25th and final song – had been performed.

Germany won with 246 points, winning both the jury vote and the televote. Turkey came second with 170 points, with Romania, Denmark, Azerbaijan, Belgium, Armenia, Greece, Georgia and Ukraine completing the top ten. Cyprus, Moldova, Ireland, Belarus and the United Kingdom occupied the bottom five positions.

Winner

Results of the final of the Eurovision Song Contest 2010
R/O	Country	Artist	Song	Points	Place
1	Azerbaijan	Safura	"Drip Drop"	145	5
2	Spain	Daniel Diges	"Algo pequeñito"	68	15
3	Norway	Didrik Solli-Tangen	"My Heart Is Yours"	35	20
4	Moldova	SunStroke Project and Olia Tira	"Run Away"	27	22
5	Cyprus	Jon Lilygreen and the Islanders	"Life Looks Better in Spring"	27	21
6	Bosnia and Herzegovina	Vukašin Brajić	"Thunder and Lightning"	51	17
7	Belgium	Tom Dice	"Me and My Guitar"	143	6
8	Serbia	Milan Stanković	"Ovo je Balkan"	72	13
9	Belarus	3+2 feat. Robert Wells	"Butterflies"	18	24
10	Ireland	Niamh Kavanagh	"It's for You"	25	23
11	Greece	Giorgos Alkaios and Friends	"Opa"	140	8
12	United Kingdom	Josh Dubovie	"That Sounds Good to Me"	10	25
13	Georgia	Sofia Nizharadze	"Shine"	136	9
14	Turkey	Manga	"We Could Be the Same"	170	2
15	Albania	Juliana Pasha	"It's All About You"	62	16
16	Iceland	Hera Björk	"Je ne sais quoi"	41	19
17	Ukraine	Alyosha	"Sweet People"	108	10
18	France	Jessy Matador	"Allez Ola Olé"	82	12
19	Romania	Paula Seling and Ovi	"Playing with Fire"	162	3
20	Russia	Peter Nalitch and Friends	"Lost and Forgotten"	90	11
21	Armenia	Eva Rivas	"Apricot Stone"	141	7
22	Germany	Lena	"Satellite"	246	1
23	Portugal	Filipa Azevedo	"Há dias assim"	43	18
24	Israel	Harel Skaat	"Milim"	71	14
25	Denmark	Chanée and N'evergreen	"In a Moment like This"	149	4

==== Spokespersons ====
Each participating broadcaster appointed a spokesperson responsible for announcing the votes for its respective country. They revealed their votes in the following order:

1. Romania – Malvina Cservenschi
2. Ireland – Derek Mooney
3. Germany – Hape Kerkeling
4. Serbia – Maja Nikolić
5. Albania – Leon Menkshi
6. Turkey – Meltem Ersan Yazgan
7. Croatia – Mila Horvat
8. Poland – Aleksandra Rosiak
9. Bosnia and Herzegovina – Ivana Vidmar
10. Finland – Johanna Pirttilahti
11. Slovenia – Andrea F
12. Estonia – Rolf Junior
13. Russia – Oxana Fedorova
14. Portugal – Ana Galvão
15. Azerbaijan – Tamilla Shirinova
16. Greece – Alexis Kostalas
17. Iceland – Yohanna
18. Denmark – Bryan Rice
19. France – Audrey Chauveau
20. Spain – Ainhoa Arbizu
21. Slovakia – Ľubomír Bajaník
22. Bulgaria – Desislava Dobreva
23. Ukraine – Iryna Zhuravska
24. Latvia – Kārlis Būmeisters
25. Malta – Chiara Siracusa
26. Norway – Anne Rimmen
27. Cyprus – Christina Metaxa
28. Lithuania – Giedrius Masalskis
29. Belarus – Aleksei Grishin
30. Switzerland – Christa Rigozzi
31. Belgium – Katja Retsin
32. United Kingdom – Scott Mills
33. Netherlands – Yolanthe Cabau van Kasbergen
34. Israel – Ofer Nachshon
35. Macedonia – Maja Daniels
36. Moldova – Tania Cergă
37. Georgia – Mariam Vashadze
38. Sweden – Eric Saade
39. Armenia – Nazeni Hovhannisyan

== Detailed voting results ==
The split jury/televoting results were announced by the EBU in June 2010. Only the split totals received by each country were given, not the full breakdown.

=== Semi-final 1 ===
In the first semifinal, one unknown country had only a jury because the votes of the country did not meet the EBU threshold.

Qualifiers

Split results of semi-final 1
Place	Combined		Jury		Televoting	
Place	Country	Points	Country	Points	Country	Points
1	Belgium	167	Belgium	165	Greece	151
2	Greece	133	Portugal	107	Iceland	149
3	Iceland	123	Greece	99	Belgium	146
4	Portugal	89	Albania	96	Russia	92
5	Serbia	79	Bosnia and Herzegovina	86	Serbia	92
6	Albania	76	Iceland	85	Finland	69
7	Russia	74	Malta	66	Albania	68
8	Bosnia and Herzegovina	59 (Note: Despite finishing with the same number of points as Belarus, Bosnia and Herzegovina is deemed to have finished in eighth place due to receiving a greater individual score from one country, as both countries received points from the same number of national juries.)	Serbia	65	Belarus	63
9	Belarus	59	Estonia	64	Portugal	58
10	Moldova	52	Macedonia	62	Moldova	54
11	Finland	49	Poland	58	Bosnia and Herzegovina	42
12	Malta	45	Belarus	47	Malta	40
13	Poland	44	Moldova	42	Poland	38
14	Estonia	39	Russia	41	Slovakia	34
15	Macedonia	37	Finland	37	Macedonia	30
16	Slovakia	24	Slovakia	25	Estonia	22
17	Latvia	11	Latvia	15	Latvia	12

Detailed voting results of semi-final 1
		Total score	Moldova	Russia	Estonia	Slovakia	Finland	Latvia	Serbia	Bosnia and Herzegovina	Poland	Belgium	Malta	Albania	Greece	Portugal	Macedonia	Belarus	Iceland	France	Germany	Spain
Contestants	Moldova	52		5					1			2	7		4	8	7	10		3		5
Contestants	Russia	74	12		12		3	10	4	2	8	5	1		3	1		12			1	
Contestants	Estonia	39					12	12		1	5			1	1	4		1	2			
Contestants	Slovakia	24					2		6	5		1				5			5			
Contestants	Finland	49		3	10	2		6			1	7	2					7	6		3	2
Contestants	Latvia	11			6		5															
Contestants	Serbia	79	3	4	1	6		3		12		3		3	7	2	10		3	12	4	6
Contestants	Bosnia and Herzegovina	59	1	2		5			12		6		3	7	5		8	4		6		
Contestants	Poland	44	2	6				4				6		6				3		7	7	3
Contestants	Belgium	167	6	10	8	10	10	8	7	4	12		12	4	10	12	4	8	12	10	12	8
Contestants	Malta	45			3	12	1	1		6				2	2	3	6	2	4		2	1
Contestants	Albania	76					4		2	7	4	8	6		12		12		10	2	5	4
Contestants	Greece	133	7	7	2	8	8		10	8	7	10	8	10		10	3	5	8	4	8	10
Contestants	Portugal	89	5		5	4	6	7	5	3	2	4	4	5			2		7	8	10	12
Contestants	Macedonia	37	4	1		1			8	10				12					1			
Contestants	Belarus	59	8	12	4	3		5			3		5		6	7	5			1		
Contestants	Iceland	123	10	8	7	7	7	2	3		10	12	10	8	8	6	1	6		5	6	7

==== 12 points ====
Below is a summary of the maximum 12 points each country awarded to another in the 1st semi-final:

N.	Contestant	Nation(s) giving 12 points
5	Belgium	Germany, Iceland, Malta, Poland, Portugal
3	Russia	Belarus, Estonia, Moldova
2	Albania	Greece, Macedonia
2	Estonia	Finland, Latvia
2	Serbia	Bosnia and Herzegovina, France
1	Belarus	Russia
1	Bosnia and Herzegovina	Serbia
1	Iceland	Belgium
1	Macedonia	Albania
1	Malta	Slovakia
1	Portugal	Spain

=== Semi-final 2 ===
Qualifiers

Split results of semi-final 2
Place	Combined		Jury		Televoting	
Place	Country	Points	Country	Points	Country	Points
1	Turkey	118	Georgia	117	Azerbaijan	126
2	Azerbaijan	113	Turkey	93	Turkey	119
3	Georgia	106	Azerbaijan	89	Romania	113
4	Romania	104	Israel	88	Denmark	106
5	Denmark	101	Armenia	84	Georgia	102
6	Armenia	83	Ireland	84	Armenia	90
7	Ukraine	77	Denmark	83	Ukraine	77
8	Israel	71	Romania	80	Lithuania	65
9	Ireland	67 (Note: Despite finishing with the same number of points as Cyprus, Ireland is deemed to have finished in ninth place due to receiving points from a greater number of countries.)	Cyprus	79	Sweden	64
10	Cyprus	67	Ukraine	78	Cyprus	53
11	Sweden	62	Sweden	76	Netherlands	49
12	Lithuania	44	Croatia	54	Israel	46
13	Croatia	33	Lithuania	27	Ireland	43
14	Netherlands	29	Netherlands	26	Croatia	22
15	Bulgaria	19	Bulgaria	25	Bulgaria	15
16	Slovenia	6	Switzerland	14	Slovenia	11
17	Switzerland	2	Slovenia	5	Switzerland	1

Detailed voting results of semi-final 2
		Total score	Lithuania	Armenia	Israel	Denmark	Switzerland	Sweden	Azerbaijan	Ukraine	Netherlands	Romania	Slovenia	Ireland	Bulgaria	Cyprus	Croatia	Georgia	Turkey	Norway	United Kingdom
Contestants	Lithuania	44		2		1		4		2				12		2	1	8		5	7
Contestants	Armenia	83	1		12		3	5		8	10	10			8	12		10	4		
Contestants	Israel	71		8				8	7	6	12	3	5		1	4		5		7	5
Contestants	Denmark	101	5	5	7		5	12	6	5	4	12	10	4	2	3	4	3	6	8	
Contestants	Switzerland	2																2			
Contestants	Sweden	62	3	3		12	10		2		6	1		5		1	2		2	12	3
Contestants	Azerbaijan	113	2		5	5	6	3		12	1	8	8	10	7	10	10	12	12	2	
Contestants	Ukraine	77	10	10	2	3			8		2	5	1	2	6	6	6	7	3	4	2
Contestants	Netherlands	29			4	4	2	1					6	3				1	5	3	
Contestants	Romania	104	6	4	8	8	4	7	5	3	3		4	6	4	8		4	8	10	12
Contestants	Slovenia	6			1												5				
Contestants	Ireland	67	7	1	3	6	12		4		8	4	2				3		1	6	10
Contestants	Bulgaria	19								1						5			7		6
Contestants	Cyprus	67	4	6	10	7		6	3	4		6			5		12				4
Contestants	Croatia	33		7		2	7		1				12	1	3						
Contestants	Georgia	106	12	12	6		1	2	10	7	5	2	7	7	10	7	7		10		1
Contestants	Turkey	118	8			10	8	10	12	10	7	7	3	8	12		8	6		1	8

==== 12 points ====
Below is a summary of the maximum 12 points each country awarded to another in the 2nd semi-final:

N.	Contestant	Nation(s) giving 12 points
3	Azerbaijan	Georgia, Turkey, Ukraine
2	Armenia	Cyprus, Israel
2	Denmark	Romania, Sweden
2	Georgia	Armenia, Lithuania
2	Sweden	Denmark, Norway
2	Turkey	Azerbaijan, Bulgaria
1	Croatia	Slovenia
1	Cyprus	Croatia
1	Ireland	Switzerland
1	Israel	Netherlands
1	Lithuania	Ireland
1	Romania	United Kingdom

=== Final ===
Winner

Split results of the final
Place	Combined		Jury		Televoting	
Place	Country	Points	Country	Points	Country	Points
1	Germany	246	Germany	187	Germany	243
2	Turkey	170	Belgium	185	Turkey	177
3	Romania	162	Romania	167	Denmark	174
4	Denmark	149	Georgia	160	Armenia	166
5	Azerbaijan	145	Israel	134	Azerbaijan	161
6	Belgium	143	Ukraine	129	Romania	155
7	Armenia	141	Denmark	121	Greece	152
8	Greece	140	Turkey	119	France	151
9	Georgia	136	Azerbaijan	116	Georgia	127
10	Ukraine	108	Armenia	116	Serbia	110
11	Russia	90	Greece	110	Russia	107
12	France	82	Albania	97	Spain	106
13	Serbia	72	Portugal	69	Ukraine	94
14	Israel	71	Bosnia and Herzegovina	65	Belgium	76
15	Spain	68	Russia	63	Iceland	40
16	Albania	62	Ireland	62	Bosnia and Herzegovina	35
17	Bosnia and Herzegovina	51	Norway	61	Albania	35
18	Portugal	43	Cyprus	57	Moldova	28
19	Iceland	41	Iceland	57	Israel	27
20	Norway	35	Spain	43	Portugal	24
21	Cyprus	27	Serbia	37	Norway	18
22	Moldova	27	France	34	Belarus	18
23	Ireland	25	Moldova	33	Cyprus	16
24	Belarus	18	Belarus	22	Ireland	15
25	United Kingdom	10	United Kingdom	18	United Kingdom	7

Detailed voting results of the final
		Total score	Romania	Ireland	Germany	Serbia	Albania	Turkey	Croatia	Poland	Bosnia and Herzegovina	Finland	Slovenia	Estonia	Russia	Portugal	Azerbaijan	Greece	Iceland	Denmark	France	Spain	Slovakia	Bulgaria	Ukraine	Latvia	Malta	Norway	Cyprus	Lithuania	Belarus	Switzerland	Belgium	United Kingdom	Netherlands	Israel	Macedonia	Moldova	Georgia	Sweden	Armenia
Contestants	Azerbaijan	145		3				12		8	7				8			1	4	2		7		12	12	2	12	7	10		6	2	5			7	3	7	8		
Contestants	Spain	68	2				7					4	5		4	12								2	4	5				8			1			1		4	2		7
Contestants	Norway	35		2										7		3				5			3				3												6	4	2
Contestants	Moldova	27	10													6	6														4								1		
Contestants	Cyprus	27							4									12		1			2	4						1										3	
Contestants	Bosnia and Herzegovina	51				12	6	8	10				4								5																6				
Contestants	Belgium	143	4	10	12	5				10		6		3	5	5		6	10	10	7		10		1	4	10	3		7		7			6					2	
Contestants	Serbia	72			5		3		8		12		8								10								1			10			1		7			7	
Contestants	Belarus	18													2									1														3	12		
Contestants	Ireland	25			2				1			1		2																		6		7		6					
Contestants	Greece	140	7		8	10	12	3		1	6	7				8			8		4	5	5	5			7		12				12	12	3			2			3
Contestants	United Kingdom	10		4			1										2																						3		
Contestants	Georgia	136		5				5	7	4	4		1	8	10		8	5	2			1		6	7			1	5	12	7	1	4			5	5	5		6	12
Contestants	Turkey	170	8	1	10	3	8		12		10	3	2	6			12			6	12	3		10	8			2		4	3	3	6	10	8		10		5	5	
Contestants	Albania	62	1		1			7	5	2	5							10	7													8	3	1			12				
Contestants	Iceland	41			4							5		4				3		3							6	6			2		8								
Contestants	Ukraine	108	5			7		1		3					7		10				2			7		7			6	6	10			5	7	2		8	7		8
Contestants	France	82		6	3	4			3		3	8	3	1		7		8	6	7		2					2	4	3					2		3	1				6
Contestants	Romania	162		7		6	5	2		6	2		7		3	10	7	4	5	8		10	1		2	3	5	10	8	2	1	4		8	5	8		12		10	1
Contestants	Russia	90						4						10		2	3						6		10	8				5	12					10		10			10
Contestants	Armenia	141	6		7	1		6		5					12			7			6	8	4	8	6	1			7		5		7		12	12	4	6	10	1	
Contestants	Germany	246	3	8		8	10	10	6	7	8	12	10	12	6	1	1	2	3	12	3	12	12	3	5	12	4	12	4	10		12	10	4	4		8			12	
Contestants	Portugal	43			6	2													1	4	8	6				6	1					5									4
Contestants	Israel	71					4				1	10	6				5				1		8		3			5	2		8			3	10			1	4		
Contestants	Denmark	149	12	12			2		2	12		2	12	5	1	4	4		12			4	7			10	8	8		3			2	6	2	4	2			8	5

==== 12 points ====
Below is a summary of the maximum 12 points each country awarded to another in the final:

N.	Contestant	Nation(s) giving 12 points
9	Germany	Denmark, Estonia, Finland, Latvia, Norway, Slovakia, Spain, Sweden, Switzerland
5	Denmark	Iceland, Ireland, Poland, Romania, Slovenia
4	Azerbaijan	Bulgaria, Malta, Turkey, Ukraine
4	Greece	Albania, Belgium, Cyprus, United Kingdom
3	Armenia	Israel, Netherlands, Russia
3	Turkey	Azerbaijan, Croatia, France
2	Georgia	Armenia, Lithuania
1	Albania	Macedonia
1	Belarus	Georgia
1	Belgium	Germany
1	Bosnia and Herzegovina	Serbia
1	Cyprus	Greece
1	Romania	Moldova
1	Russia	Belarus
1	Serbia	Bosnia and Herzegovina
1	Spain	Portugal

== Broadcasts ==
Most broadcasters sent commentators to Oslo or commentated from their own country, in order to add insight to the participants and, if necessary, provide voting information.

Broadcasters and commentators in participating countries
Country	Broadcaster	Channel(s)	Show(s)	Commentator(s)	Ref(s)
Bosnia and Herzegovina	BHRT	BHT 1	All shows	Dejan Kukrić	
Croatia	HRT	HRT 2	Semi-finals	Duško Ćurlić	
Croatia	HRT	HRT 1	Final	Duško Ćurlić	
Cyprus	CyBC	RIK 1	All shows	Melina Karageorgiou	
Cyprus	CyBC	RIK Deftero	All shows	Nathan Morley	
Denmark	DR	DR1 (Note: The final was re-broadcast on 26 June 2010 at 13:47 (CEST))	All shows	Nicolai Molbech	
Finland	YLE	YLE TV2	All shows	Finnish: Jaana Pelkonen and Asko Murtomäki; Swedish: Thomas Larsson	
Finland	YLE	YLE Radio Suomi	All shows	Sanna Kojo and Jorma Hietamäki	
France	France Télévisions	France 4	Semi-finals	Peggy Olmi and Yann Renoard	
France	France Télévisions	France 3	Final	Cyril Hanouna and Stéphane Bern	
Germany	ARD	Das Erste	All shows	Peter Urban	
Germany	ARD	NDR 2	Final	Tim Frühling and Thomas Mohr	
Greece	ERT	NET	All shows	Rika Vagiani	
Greece	ERT	Deftero Programma	All shows	Maria Kozakou	
Iceland	RÚV	Sjónvarpið, Rás 2	All shows	Sigmar Guðmundsson	
Ireland	RTÉ	RTÉ Two	Semi-finals	Marty Whelan	
Ireland	RTÉ	RTÉ One	Final	Marty Whelan	
Israel	IBA	Channel 1	All shows	No commentary	
Malta	PBS	TVM	All shows	Valerie Vella	
Netherlands	TROS	Nederland 1	All shows	Cornald Maas and Daniël Dekker	
Portugal	RTP	RTP1	All shows	Sérgio Mateus	
Romania	TVR	TVR1	All shows	Leonard Miron and Gianina Corondan	
Serbia	RTS	RTS1, RTS Sat	SF1/Final	Duška Vučinić-Lučić	
Serbia	RTS	RTS1, RTS Sat	SF2	Dragan Ilić	
Slovakia	STV	Jednotka	All shows		
Slovenia	RTVSLO	TV SLO 2	Semi-finals	Andrej Hofer	
Slovenia	RTVSLO	TV SLO 1	Final	Andrej Hofer	
Sweden	SVT	SVT1	All shows	Christine Meltzer and Edward af Sillén	
Sweden	SR	SR P4	All shows	Carolina Norén and Björn Kjellman	
Switzerland	SRG SSR	SF zwei	SF2/Final		
Switzerland	SRG SSR	TSR 2	SF2/Final		
Switzerland	SRG SSR	RSI La 2	SF2		
Switzerland	SRG SSR	RSI La 1	Final		
Turkey	TRT	TRT 1	All shows		
United Kingdom	BBC	BBC Three	Semi-finals	Paddy O'Connell and Sarah Cawood	
United Kingdom	BBC	BBC One	Final	Graham Norton	
United Kingdom	BBC	BBC Radio 2	Final	Ken Bruce	

Broadcasters and commentators in non-participating countries
Country	Broadcaster	Channel(s)	Show(s)	Commentator(s)	Ref(s)
Australia	SBS	SBS One	All shows	Julia Zemiro and Sam Pang	
Hungary	MTV	Duna TV	All shows	Zsolt Jeszenszky	
Montenegro	RTCG	RTCG 1	All shows		

=== International broadcasts ===
- Australia – Even though Australia was not eligible to enter, the contest was broadcast on Special Broadcasting Service (SBS), a free-to-air television station, as in previous years. As in 2009, the coverage featured local commentary and segments from Julia Zemiro and Sam Pang.

The first semi-final was broadcast on 28 May 2010, the second semi-final on 29 May 2010, and the final on 30 May 2010, with all shows broadcast at 19:30 AEST (09:30 UTC). The first semi final rated a respectable 316,000 viewers, the second semi-final rated 415,000 viewers and the final rated 366,000, a solid result considering Sunday night offers tough competition on the commercial networks. The final was also simulcast on a special digital radio station, set-up by the network, which aired classic Eurovision songs in the lead-up to the event. SBS also aired the EBU-produced Countdown To Eurovision specials on 14 May and 21 May at 4 pm.

For the 2010 contest, SBS broadcast a special TV programme The A to Z of Eurovision one week before the contest. This 90-minute programme was a 20 to 1 style show that played the craziest, campest and most controversial moments from Eurovision history with guests and performers. It also featured as a form guide to find out who was hot that year, and what to look out for the following weekend. Eurovision performers including Johnny Logan and Dima Bilan as well as Australian celebrities appeared as guests during the show which was hosted by Zemiro and Pang.

- New Zealand – Although New Zealand is not eligible to enter the contest, the contest was broadcast on Triangle TV's satellite channel STRATOS. It broadcast both the Eurovision Song Contest 2010 semi finals as well as the final as a delayed broadcast.
- Hungary – It was announced at the Reference Group meeting on 22 March 2010 that Hungary would be broadcasting the contest. Duna TV, currently an approved member of the EBU, has been confirmed as broadcasting the contest in Hungary after Magyar Televízió, the current Hungarian broadcaster, pulled out. They have also announced that they will attempt to send a Hungarian entry to the 2011 contest.
- Kazakhstan – It was announced at the Reference Group meeting on 22 March 2010 that Kazakhstan would be broadcasting the contest.
- Kosovo – It was announced at the Reference Group meeting on 22 March 2010 that Kosovo would be broadcasting the contest.
- Montenegro – Despite not participating in 2010's Eurovision Song Contest due to financial trouble, the national broadcaster of Montenegro, RTCG, aired both semi finals and the final live on its main channel RTCG1.

The official Eurovision Song Contest website provided a live stream without commentary via the peer-to-peer medium Octoshape. Eurovision 2010 was also broadcast worldwide through European streams such as BVN, RTS SAT, HRT SAT, RTP Internacional, TVE Internacional, TVP Polonia, TRT Avaz, BNT Sat, ERT World, and SVT World, among others. Some radio stations such as those in Bosnia and Herzegovina, Croatia, and Radio Tirana in Albania broadcast live through their internet websites as well as on their satellite channels.

=== High-definition broadcasts ===
For the fourth time, the contest was broadcast in high-definition. Some broadcasters aired the contest in HD through their high-definition channel:

- Australia – SBS HD
- Belgium – Eén HD
- Denmark – DR HD
- Estonia – ETV HD
- Germany – Das Erste HD
- Hungary – Duna TV HD
- Israel – Hot HD and Yes HD
- Netherlands – Nederland 1 HD
- Norway – NRK HD
- Poland – TVP HD
- Portugal – RTP HD
- Romania – TVR HD
- Serbia – RTS HD
- Spain – TVE HD (deferred)
- Sweden – SVT HD
- Turkey – TRT HD
- United Kingdom – BBC HD

== Other awards ==
In addition to the main winner's trophy, the Marcel Bezençon Awards and the Barbara Dex Award were contested during the 2010 Eurovision Song Contest. The OGAE, "General Organisation of Eurovision Fans" voting poll also took place before the contest.

=== Marcel Bezençon Awards ===
The Marcel Bezençon Awards, organised since 2002 by Sweden's then-Head of Delegation and 1992 representative Christer Björkman, and 1984 winner Richard Herrey, honours songs in the contest's final. The awards are divided into three categories: Artistic Award, Composers Award, and Press Award. This is the first and to date the only occasion in which an entry managed to win in all categories.

Category	Country	Song	Artist	Songwriter(s)
Artistic Award	Israel	"Milim" (מילים)	Harel Skaat	Tomer Hadadi; Noam Horev
Composers Award	Israel	"Milim" (מילים)	Harel Skaat	Tomer Hadadi; Noam Horev
Press Award	Israel	"Milim" (מילים)	Harel Skaat	Tomer Hadadi; Noam Horev

=== OGAE ===
OGAE, an organisation of over forty Eurovision Song Contest fan clubs across Europe and beyond, conducts an annual voting poll first held in 2002 as the Marcel Bezençon Fan Award. After all votes were cast, the top-ranked entry in the 2010 poll was Denmark's "In a Moment like This" performed by Chanée and N'evergreen; the top five results are shown below.

Country	Song	Artist	Points
Denmark	"In a Moment like This"	Chanée and N'evergreen	220
Israel	"Milim"	Harel Skaat	177
Germany	"Satellite"	Lena	172
Norway	"My Heart Is Yours"	Didrik Solli-Tangen	146
Iceland	"Je ne sais quoi"	Hera Björk	130

=== Barbara Dex Award ===
The Barbara Dex Award is a humorous fan award given to the worst dressed artist each year. Named after Belgium's representative who came last in the 1993 contest, wearing her self-designed dress, the award was handed by the fansite House of Eurovision from 1997 to 2016 and is being carried out by the fansite songfestival.be since 2017.

Place	Country	Artist	Votes
1	Serbia	Milan Stanković	138
2	Moldova	SunStroke Project and Olia Tira	110
3	Russia	Peter Nalitch and Friends	109
4	Latvia	Aisha	99
5	Armenia	Eva Rivas	79

== Official album ==
Cover art of the official album

Eurovision Song Contest: Oslo 2010 was the official compilation album of the 2010 contest, put together by the European Broadcasting Union and released by EMI Records and CMC International on 17 May 2010.The album featured all 39 songs that entered in the 2010 contest, including the semi-finalists that failed to qualify into the grand final.

=== Charts ===
Chart (2010)	Peak position
German Compilation Albums (Offizielle Top 100)	3
