= It's All About You (Juliana Pasha song) =

2010 song by Juliana Pasha

Single by Juliana Pasha
- Released: 17 March 2010
- Genre: Pop
- Length: 3:04
- Label: EMI
- Songwriter(s): Ardit Gjebrea; Pirro Çako
- Producer(s): Ardit Gjebrea

Juliana Pasha singles chronology
| "Një Jetë" (2008) | "It's All About You" (2010) | "Sa e shite Zemrën" (2010) |

Music video
- "It's All About You" on YouTube

Eurovision Song Contest 2010 entry
- Country: Albania
- Artist(s): Juliana Pasha
- Language: English
- Composer(s): Ardit Gjebrea
- Lyricist(s): Ardit Gjebrea; Pirro Çako

Finals performance
- Semi-final result: 6th
- Semi-final points: 76
- Final result: 16th
- Final points: 62

Entry chronology
- ◄ "Carry Me in Your Dreams" (2009)
- "Feel the Passion" (2011) ►

"It's All About You" is a song by Albanian singer Juliana Pasha. It was released as a single on 17 May 2010 by EMI. The song was composed by Ardit Gjebrea and written by the latter together with Pirro Çako. Musically, it is an English-language uptempo-pop song, which lyrically makes reference to the singer's Christian faith honoring the bond between a woman and her god.

The song represented Albania in the Eurovision Song Contest 2010 in Oslo, Norway, after Pasha won the pre-selection competition, Festivali i Këngës, with the Albanian-language version "Nuk mundem pa ty". It reached the 16th place during the grand final in a field of 25, gathering a total of 62 points. During her blue and violet-themed performance, Pasha was accompanied a violin player and three backing vocalists with the stage being decorated with silver-hanging balls.

The accompanying music video premiered on the official YouTube channel of the Eurovision Song Contest on 23 March 2010. A religion-inspired video, it depicts the story of a woman and her relationship with her god. For promotional and supporting purposes, Pasha performed the song live on various occasions, including in Amsterdam and Skopje. Commercially, the song charted within the top twenty five on the Belgium's Ultratip after the contest.

== Background and composition ==
In 2009, Juliana Pasha was one of the thirty six contestants selected to compete in the 48th edition of Festivali i Këngës, Albania's pre-selection competition to select their entry for the Eurovision Song Contest 2010. As part of the competition's rules, the lyrics of the participating entries had to be in the Albanian language. She therefore participated with the Albanian-language version "Nuk mundem pa ty", which was later remastered for the purpose of the singer's Eurovision Song Contest participation.

"It's All About You" was composed by Ardit Gjebrea and written by Gjebrea together with Pirro Çako. It is an English-language uptempo-pop song, which lyrically makes reference to Pasha's Christian faith, honoring the bond between a woman and her god. William Lee Adams of Wiwibloggs called the song a "dance anthem" with "playful and catchy" lyrics. It was first released in March 2010 and later on 17 May 2010 in the United Kingdom through EMI. (Note: The exact date can not be determined precisely but HuffPost indicates the month and year, although it does not specify the medium or country.)

== Promotion ==
An accompanying music video was uploaded to the official YouTube channel of the Eurovision Song Contest on 23 March 2010. During the video, Pasha wears a white dress to represent purity, and blows flowers and touches trees that magically illuminate to connote that she is ripe for a relationship with the Lord. Within a prominent shot, the singer appears as three separate females in one shot, described by William Lee Adams of Wiwibloggs, as an allusion to the Holy Trinity. For further promotional purposes, the singer made appearances throughout Europe with numerous live performances, including in Amsterdam. She also appeared to perform live at the Skopje Fest 2010, Macedonia's pre-selection competition to determine their participant for the Eurovision Song Contest 2010.

== At Eurovision ==
=== Festivali i Këngës ===
The national broadcaster, Radio Televizioni Shqiptar (RTSH), organised the 48th edition of Festivali i Këngës to determine the Albania's participant for the Eurovision Song Contest 2010 in Oslo, Norway. Following a submission period, a jury panel internally selected 38 songs to participate in the competition's semi-finals and were announced in November 2009. Juliana Pasha qualified for the grand final during the first semi-final on 24 December and ultimately won the competition three days later on 27 December.

=== Oslo ===
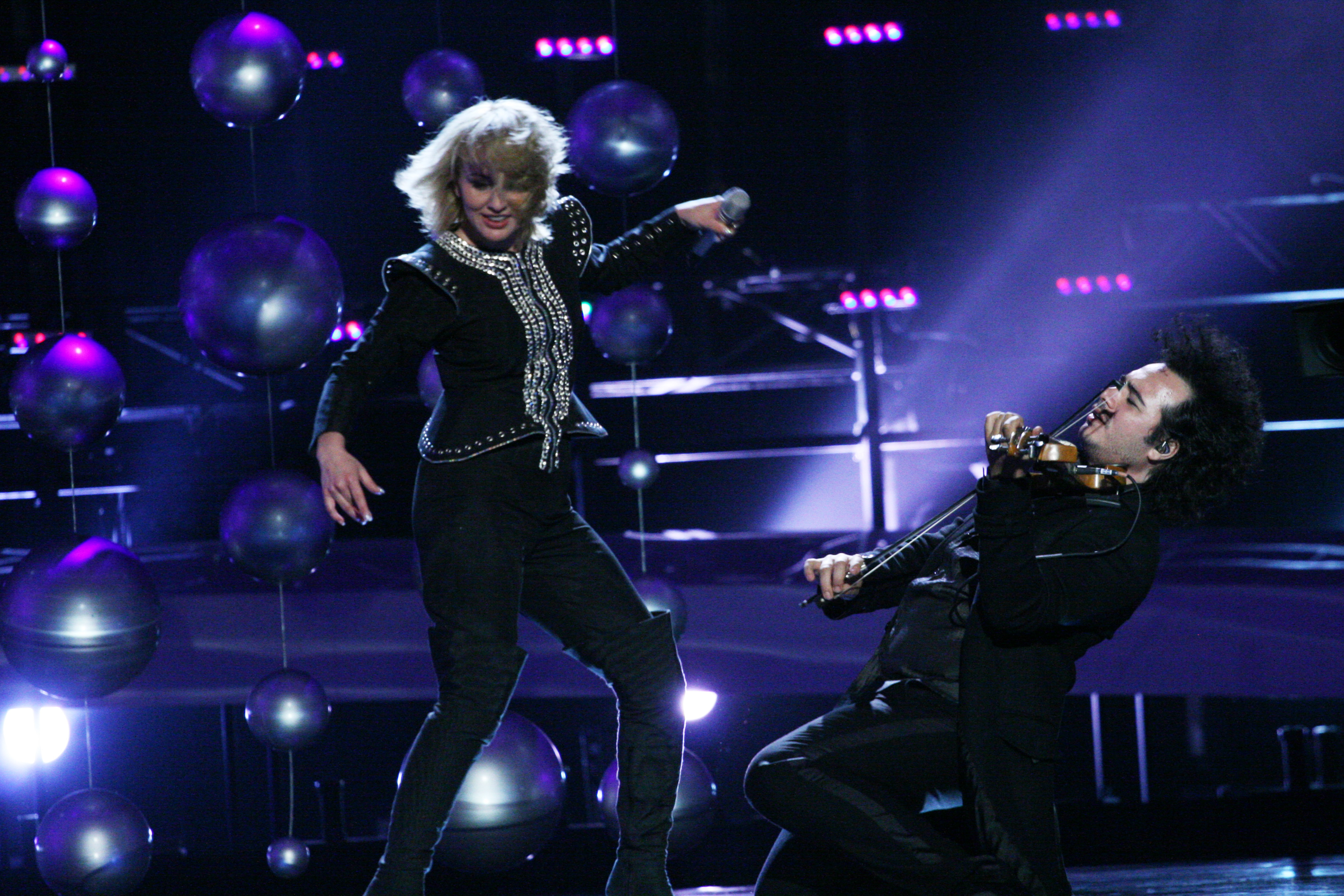
Juliana Pasha and the violinist Olen Cesari during a rehearsal at the Eurovision Song Contest stage in Oslo.

The 55th edition of the Eurovision Song Contest took place in Oslo, Norway, and consisted of two semi-finals on 25 and 27 May, and the grand final on 29 May 2010. According to the Eurovision rules, each participating country, except the host country and the "Big Five", consisting of France, Germany, Italy, Spain and the United Kingdom, were required to qualify from one of the two semi-finals to compete for the grand final, although, the top ten countries from the respective semi-final progress to the grand final. On 7 February 2010, it was announced that Albania would be performing in the second half of the first semi-final of the contest.

During the first semi-final, Albania performed twelfth, following Malta and preceding Greece, and qualified for the grand final in sixth place with 76 points, ranking fourth by the jury's 96 points and seventh by the televote of 68 points. At the grand final, the country performed fifteenth, following Turkey and preceding Iceland. Albania finished in the sixteenth place in a field of twenty five with 62 points, ranking twelfth by the jury's 97 points and seventeenth by the televote of 35 points.

Described as modest, Juliana Pasha's show sees her accompanied a violin player, Olen Cesari, and three backing vocalists—Jazz singers Joy, Daisy and Glennis—originally from the United States. During her performance, the stage was decorated with silver-hanging balls moving to the song's rhythm, while different purple and white lights were displayed on the LED screens in the background.

== Track listing ==
- Digital download
1. "It's All About You" – 3:04

== Charts ==
| Chart (2010) | Peak position |
|---|---|
| Belgium (Ultratip Bubbling Under Flanders) | 21 |

== Release history ==
| Region | Date | Format(s) | Label | Ref. |
|---|---|---|---|---|
| United Kingdom | 17 May 2010 | Digital download | EMI | |
