= Malda Susuri =

Kosovo Albanian singer (1988)

- Born: 1988 (age 37–38); Prizren, Kosovo
- Years active: 2006–present
- Musical career
- Genres: pop
- Occupation: singer
- Instruments: vocals

Malda Susuri (born in 1988) is a Kosovo Albanian singer, visual artist and graphic designer. She is known for her 2006 participation at Top Fest 3, winning the Best New Artist award for her breakthrough hit Dashuri e hidhur.

== Early life and education ==
Born into an Albanian family, Malda began singing independently as a solo performer at social gatherings and small events. While studying at the "Gjon Buzuku Gymnasium" in Prizren, she auditioned for the popular television talent show Ethet e së premtes mbrëma but was not accepted. Determined to continue her artistic path, she later competed in Pop Idol, reaching second place.

== Career ==
Susuri launched her professional music career at the age of 18, debuting at Top Fest 3 with the hit Dashuri e Hidhur, which reached the finals, earning her the Best New Artist award.

In 2007, she made her return to Top Fest with the song Jeta pa ty and later that year released the video for S’të kam afër. The following year, she introduced the track Heronjtë. In 2009, she competed in Top Fest 6 with Vetëm shko, featuring lyrics written by her sister, Aurora and music composed by Faton Dolaku. A few months later, she appeared at Festivali i Këngës in a duet with Teuta Kurti, performing the song Mall i pashuar.

In 2011, she competed at Kënga Magjike with the song Jam e huaj and the following year released the single Larg vetes, accompanied by a music video.

== Visual arts ==
In September 2019, Susuri collaborated with curator Rudina Voca in the opening of her art exhibition, Molla, in Prizren. Comprising twelve photographs, the exhibition reinterpreted the symbolism of the apple by presenting women as empowered, resilient and dignified figures. As a feminist artist, Susuri integrates social awareness into her creative work, using her artistic expression to challenge negative portrayals of women.

== Discography ==
=== Singles ===
- Dashuri e hidhur (2006)
- E ikën kur do ti (2006)
- Jeta pa ty (2007)
- S'të kam afër (2007)
- Heronjtë (2008)
- Vetëm shko (2009)
- Mall i pashuar (feat. Teuta Kurti, 2009)
- Jam e huaj (2011)
- Larg vetes (2012)
- Sikur (feat. Art Lokaj, 2013)
- Ndryshe (2023)
- Ti sem sheh kur qaj (2024)
- E pamundur (2024)
- Grindje (2024)
- Të kam në mendje (2024)
