= Mila Horvat =

Croatian TV host (born 1981)

Mila Horvat (born June 4, 1981) is a Croatian TV host who appears on Croatian Radiotelevision (HRT).

Horvat was born in Celje, Slovenia. She spent her childhood in Hum na Sutli, Croatia and studied journalism at the University of Zagreb (Croatian Studies program) where she received a Master of Journalism degree in 2005. Horvat started work at HRT in 2002 and became a regular host of the morning show Dobro jutro, Hrvatska (Good Morning, Croatia) as well as hosting sporting events and news programs (Goleo, Arena, Olimp, and Volim nogomet).

She hosted Dora 2010 in Opatija as well as the 2010 FIFA World Cup program Afrovizija.

In December 2010, Mila and her dancing partner, Robert Schubert, finished 2nd place in Ples sa zvijezdama, the Croatian version of Dancing with the Stars.
