= Juliana Pasha =

Albanian singer (born 1980)

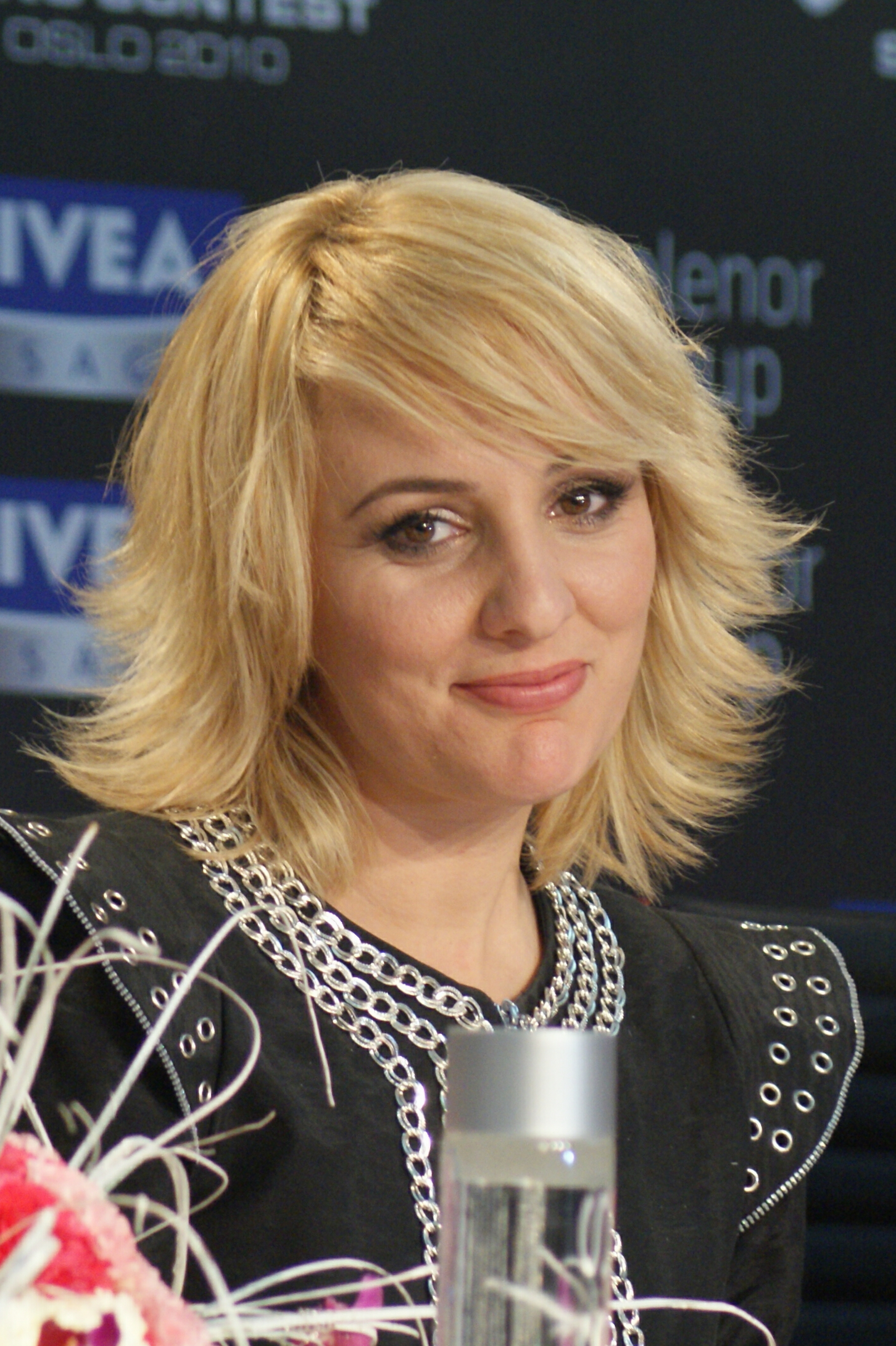

Background information
- Born: 20 May 1980 (age 45); Burrel, Albania
- Genres: Pop
- Occupation: Singer

Juliana Pasha (born 20 May 1980) is an Albanian singer. In 2010, she won Honorary Citizen Award of Burrel from the mayor of the city. After she went into Eurovision in 2010 she won the first prize in the festival "Kenga Magjike" with the song called "Sa e shite zemren". She was a mentor and judge on the first series of Albania and Kosovo's version of The X Factor.

== Eurovision 2010 ==
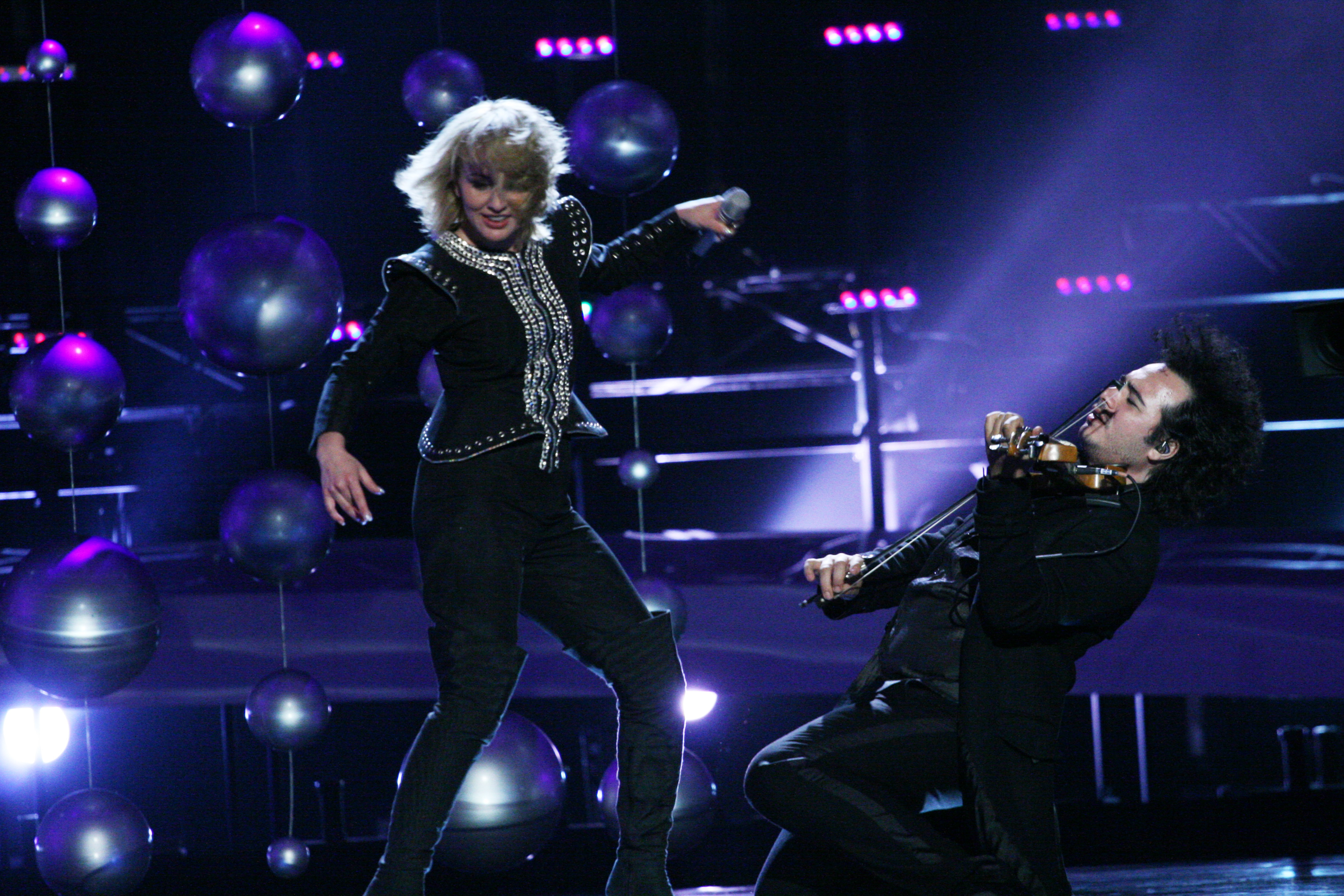
Juliana Pasha performing "It's All About You" at Bærum

On 27 December 2009, Pasha won the national final to represent Albania in the Eurovision Song Contest 2010. She had previously taken part in the 2007 and 2008 festivals, placing 3rd and 2nd respectively with "Qielli i ri" and "Një jetë", the latter a duet with Luiz Ejlli. In the contest, she qualified to the final, where she performed fifteenth, following the Turkish representants MaNga and preceding Iceland's Hera Björk, and placed 16th out of 25 contestants, receiving 62 points, which included a 12-point set from Macedonia.

== Personal life ==
Pasha has stated that she believes in God and that she believes she is "here because of his help". She has actively participated in the Hanna (PH) project, dedicated to eliminating the blood feud tradition in Albania.

== Awards ==
Kënga Magjike

Year	Nominee / work	Award	Result
2005	"Ti Une"	Çesk Zadeja Prize	Won
2008	"1000 Arsye"	Critic Prize	Won
2010	"Sa e shite zemren (ft.Luiz Ejlli)"	First Prize	Won
2012	"Diamant"	Best Vocal	Won
2012	"Diamant"	Third Prize	Won
2015	"Vullkan"	Best Vocal	Won
2015	"Vullkan"	Third Prize	Won

Kult Award

Year	Nominee / work	Award	Result
2016	"Vullkan"	Best Song of the Year	Nominated

Awards and achievements
Preceded by Kejsi Tola with Më merr në ëndërr	Festivali i Këngës; Winner; 2009	Succeeded by Aurela Gaçe with Kënga ime
Preceded by Kejsi Tola with Carry Me in Your Dreams	Albania in the Eurovision Song Contest; 2010	Succeeded by Aurela Gaçe with Feel the Passion
