= Serbia in the Eurovision Song Contest 2009 =

- Eurovision Song Contest 2009
- Participating broadcaster: Radio Television of Serbia (RTS)
- Country: Serbia
- Selection process: Beovizija 2009
- Selection date: 8 March 2009

Competing entry
- Song: "Cipela"
- Artist: Marko Kon and Milaan
- Songwriters: Aleksandar Kobac; Marko Kon; Milan Nikolić

Placement
- Semi-final result: Failed to qualify (10th)

Participation chronology

Serbia was represented at the Eurovision Song Contest 2009 with the song "Cipela", written by Aleksandar Kobac, Marko Kon, and Milan Nikolić, and performed by Marko Kon and Milaan. The Serbian participating broadcaster, Radio Television of Serbia (RTS), organised the national final Beovizija 2009 in order to select its entry for the contest. The national final consisted of two shows: a semi-final and a final on 7 and 8 March 2009, respectively. Twenty entries competed in the semi-final where eleven qualified to the final following the combination of votes from a three-member jury panel and a public televote. The eleven qualifiers competed in the final which resulted in "Cipela" performed by Marko Kon and Milaan as the winner following the combination of votes from a three-member jury panel and a public televote.

Serbia was drawn to compete in the second semi-final of the Eurovision Song Contest which took place on 14 May 2009. Performing during the show in position 4, "Cipela" was not announced among the 10 qualifying entries of the second semi-final and therefore did not qualify to compete in the final. This marked the first time that Serbia failed to qualify to the final of the Eurovision Song Contest from a semi-final since its first entry in 2007. It was later revealed that Serbia placed tenth out of the 19 participating countries in the semi-final with 60 points.

== Background ==
Prior to the 2009 contest, Radio Television of Serbia (RTS) had participated in the Eurovision Song Contest representing Serbia as an independent nation twice since its first entry in 2007, winning the contest with their debut entry "Molitva" performed by Marija Šerifović. Since then, all two of Serbia's entries have featured in the final. In 2008, "Oro" performed by Jelena Tomašević placed sixth in the final as the host country.

As part of its duties as participating broadcaster, RTS organises the selection of its entry in the Eurovision Song Contest and broadcasts the event in the country. The broadcaster confirmed its intentions to participate at the 2009 contest on 29 November 2008. Since 2007, RTS used the Beovizija national final in order to select its entry and along with its participation confirmation, the broadcaster announced the organization of Beovizija 2009 in order to select its 2009 entry.

== Before Eurovision ==
=== Beovizija 2009 ===
Beovizija 2009 was the seventh edition of the Beovizija national final organised by RTS in order to select its entry for the Eurovision Song Contest 2009. The selection consisted of a semi-final featuring twenty songs and a final featuring eleven songs to be held on 7 and 8 March 2009, respectively, at the Sava Centar in Belgrade. Both shows were hosted by Jovana Janković, Milena Vasić and Srđan Timarov. The two shows were broadcast on RTS 1, RTS Sat, in Bosnia and Herzegovina on RTRS, via radio on Radio Belgrade as well as streamed online via the broadcaster's website rts.rs.

==== Competing entries ====
Artists and songwriters were able to submit their entries between 24 December 2008 and 24 January 2009. Both artists and songwriters were required to be Serb citizens, while songs were required to be submitted in Serbian. At the closing of the deadline, 90 submissions were received. A selection committee reviewed the submissions and selected twenty entries to proceed to the national final. The selection committee consisted of RTS music editors Jelena Ilić, Ana Milićević and Jelena Vlahović. The selected competing entries were announced on 30 January 2009. On 11 February 2009, Nataša Bekvalac announced her withdrawal from the national final due to scheduled performances and private obligations. Her song "Bili smo najlepši" was performed by Ana Nikolić instead.

Artist	Song	Songwriter(s)
Ana Nikolić	"Bili smo najlepši" (Били смо најлепши)	Marina Tucaković, Aleksandar Perišić Romario
Andrej Ilić	"Nemam te" (Немам те)	Dušan Alagić
Danijel and Milica	"H8ER"	Marina Tucaković, Aleksandar Perišić Romario, Marko Kon
Dušan Zrnić	"Tvoje drugo ime je greh" (Твоје друго име је грех)	Andrej Babić
Etar	"Sanjaj me" (Сањај ме)	Boban Janković, Katarina Popović, Etar
Ivana Selakov	"Moje odbrane" (Моје одбране)	Aleksandra Milutinović, Goran Radinović
Lejla Hot	"Čekajući princa" (Чекајући принца)	Lejla Hot, Ognjen Cvekić
Marko Kon and Milan Nikolić	"Cipela" (Ципела)	Aleksandar Kobac, Marko Kon, Milan Nikolić
Minja Samardžić	"Petak uveče" (Петак увече)	Marina Tucaković, Aleksandar Perišić Romario
Oskar and Beauty Queens feat. Đorđe Marjanović	"Superstar" (Суперстар)	Ognjen Amidžić, Saša Milošević Mare
ОТ Band	"Blagoslov za kraj" (Благослов за крај)	Snežana Vukomanović, E. Owen
Pozitivan Haos	"Glorija" (Глорија)	Marina Tucaković, Ljilja Jorgovanović, Aleksandar Radulović
Saška Janković	"Nauči me" (Научи ме)	Violeta Mihajlovska, Bojan Jeremić
SevdahBaby and Miki Element	"Previše reči" (Превише речи)	Milan Stanković, Oliver Katić
Sonja Bakić	"Ništa novo" (Ништа ново)	Snežana Vukomanović, Mirko Vukomanović
Tijana Bogićević	"Pazi šta radiš" (Пази шта радиш)	Đorđe Miljenović
Trio Passage and Katarina Sotirović	"Zauvek" (Заувек)	Bojan Jeremić
Vanja Mijatović	"Led i žar" (Лед и жар)	Nadica Janković, Miša Mijatović
Zbogom Brus Li	"Ha ha ha" (Ха ha ха)	Slavko Matić, Branislav Smuk, Kosta Sivački
Zemlja Gruva	"Svejedno je" (Свеједно је)	Zemlja Gruva

==== Semi-final ====
The semi-final took place on 7 March 2009 where twenty songs competed. The ten qualifiers for the final were decided by a combination of votes from a jury panel consisting of Jelena Jovičić (actress), Jovan Maljoković (musician and composer) and Ivan Ivačković (rock critic), and the Serbian public via SMS voting. Eurovision contestants Regina, Igor Cukrov and Andrea, Next Time, Andrea Demirović, and Quartissimo and Martina, which would represent Bosnia and Herzegovina, Croatia, Macedonia, Montenegro and Slovenia in 2009, respectively, were featured as guest performers during the show.

Following the semi-final, RTS announced that Ana Nikolić and Ivana Selakov, who were both originally announced as non-qualifiers during the show, would be reinstated to the final due to technical errors in the public vote, where only votes cast during the first five minutes of the 10 minute voting period were counted. Only Selakov ultimately agreed to participate in the final.

Semi-final – 7 March 2009
R/O	Artist	Song	Jury		Televote		Total	Place
R/O	Artist	Song	Votes	Points	Votes	Points	Total	Place
1	SevdahBaby and Miki Element	"Previše reči"	7	2	360	0	2	12
2	Zbogom Brus Li	"Ha ha ha"	5	0	511	0	0	15
3	Trio Passage and Katarina Sotirović	"Zauvek"	0	0	262	0	0	20
4	Vanja Mijatović	"Led i žar"	0	0	418	0	0	18
5	Sonja Bakić	"Ništa novo"	6	0	662	2	2	13
6	Marko Kon and Milan Nikolić	"Cipela"	7	1	1,289	7	8	6
7	Andrej Ilić	"Nemam te"	11	4	371	0	4	9
8	Etar	"Sanjaj me"	3	0	658	1	1	14
9	Lejla Hot	"Čekajući princa"	10	3	301	0	3	11
10	Dušan Zrnić	"Tvoje drugo ime je greh"	16	6	314	0	6	7
11	Minja Samardžić	"Petak uveče"	0	0	366	0	0	19
12	Oskar and Beauty Queens feat. Đorđe Marjanović	"Superstar"	18	8	3,495	10	18	2
13	~~Ana Nikolić~~	~~"Bili smo najlepši"~~	~~0~~	~~0~~	~~818~~	~~5~~	~~5~~	~~8~~
14	Ivana Selakov	"Moje odbrane"	0	0	803	4	4	10
15	Pozitivan Haos	"Glorija"	16	7	2,065	8	15	4
16	Danijel and Milica	"H8ER"	23	10	1,215	6	16	3
17	Zemlja Gruva	"Svejedno je"	5	0	589	0	0	16
18	Saška Janković	"Nauči me"	15	5	761	3	8	5
19	ОТ Band	"Blagoslov za kraj"	32	12	12,328	12	24	1
20	Tijana Bogićević	"Pazi šta radiš"	0	0	430	0	0	17

Detailed Jury Votes
R/O	Song	J. Jovičić	J. Maljoković	I. Ivačković	Total
1	"Previše reči"		7		7
2	"Ha ha ha"			5	5
3	"Zauvek"				0
4	"Led i žar"				0
5	"Ništa novo"			6	6
6	"Cipela"	6		1	7
7	"Nemam te"	5	6		11
8	"Sanjaj me"		3		3
9	"Čekajući princa"	3		7	10
10	"Tvoje drugo ime je greh"	7	5	4	16
11	"Petak uveče"				0
12	"Superstar"	2	8	8	18
13	"Bili smo najlepši"				0
14	"Moje odbrane"				0
15	"Glorija"	12	4		16
16	"H8ER"	10	10	3	23
17	"Svejedno je"	1	2	2	5
18	"Nauči me"	4	1	10	15
19	"Blagoslov za kraj"	8	12	12	32
20	"Pazi šta radiš"				0

==== Final ====
The final took place on 8 March 2009. The winner, "Cipela" performed by Marko Kon and Milan Nikolić, was decided by a combination of votes from a jury panel consisting of Željko Joksimović (represented Serbia and Montenegro in the Eurovision Song Contest 2004), Kornelije Kovač (musician and composer) and Biljana Krstić (musician), and the Serbian public via SMS voting. Former Eurovision contestants Sirusho, who represented Armenia in 2008, Boaz Ma'uda, who represented Israel in 2008, and Jelena Tomašević, who represented Serbia in 2008, were featured as guest performers during the show, performing together "Time to Pray", composed by Israeli President and Nobel Peace Prize winner Shimon Peres.

Final – 8 March 2009
R/O	Artist	Song	Jury		Televote		Total	Place
R/O	Artist	Song	Votes	Points	Votes	Points	Total	Place
1	Oskar and Beauty Queens feat. Đorđe Marjanović	"Superstar"	7	2	7,696	10	12	5
2	Danijel and Milica	"H8ER"	4	1	2,630	6	7	8
3	Sonja Bakić	"Ništa novo"	0	0	672	1	1	11
4	Saška Janković	"Nauči me"	11	3	1,014	3	6	10
5	Dušan Zrnić	"Tvoje drugo ime je greh"	24	8	944	2	10	7
6	Marko Kon and Milan Nikolić	"Cipela"	30	12	3,955	7	19	1
7	OT Bend	"Blagoslov za kraj"	18	5	28,521	12	17	2
8	Andrej Ilić	"Nemam te"	19	6	614	0	6	9
9	Etar	"Sanjaj me"	28	10	1,156	5	15	3
10	Pozitivan Haos	"Glorija"	12	4	5,215	8	12	4
11	Ivana Selakov	"Moje odbrane"	21	7	1,133	4	11	6

Detailed Jury Votes
R/O	Song	Ž. Joksimović	K. Kovač	B. Krstić	Total
1	"Superstar"	2	1	4	7
2	"H8ER"	1	2	1	4
3	"Ništa novo"				0
4	"Nauči me"	3	5	3	11
5	"Tvoje drugo ime je greh"	6	12	6	24
6	"Cipela"	12	6	12	30
7	"Blagoslov za kraj"	4	7	7	18
8	"Nemam te"	10	4	5	19
9	"Sanjaj me"	8	10	10	28
10	"Glorija"	7	3	2	12
11	"Moje odbrane"	5	8	8	21

=== Controversy ===
Following the final of Beovizija 2009, controversy arose as the televoters' favourite, OT Bend, only came second despite taking in more votes than all ten remaining finalists combined. The announcement of Marko Kon and Milan Nikolić as the winners was met with booing by the audience in the venue, while OGAE Serbia published an online letter after the competition in which they questioned the "almost diametrically opposed" jury results between the semi-final and final, alongside the votes of final juror Željko Joksimović who awarded the least points to OT Bend in comparison with the other two members. Joksimović subsequently responded that he had voted, according to his conscience, in favour of a song that "no one lobbied for", adding that people have different tastes and that performers have their fans (the members of OT Bend consisted of contestants from the reality talent show Operacija trijumf).

== At Eurovision ==
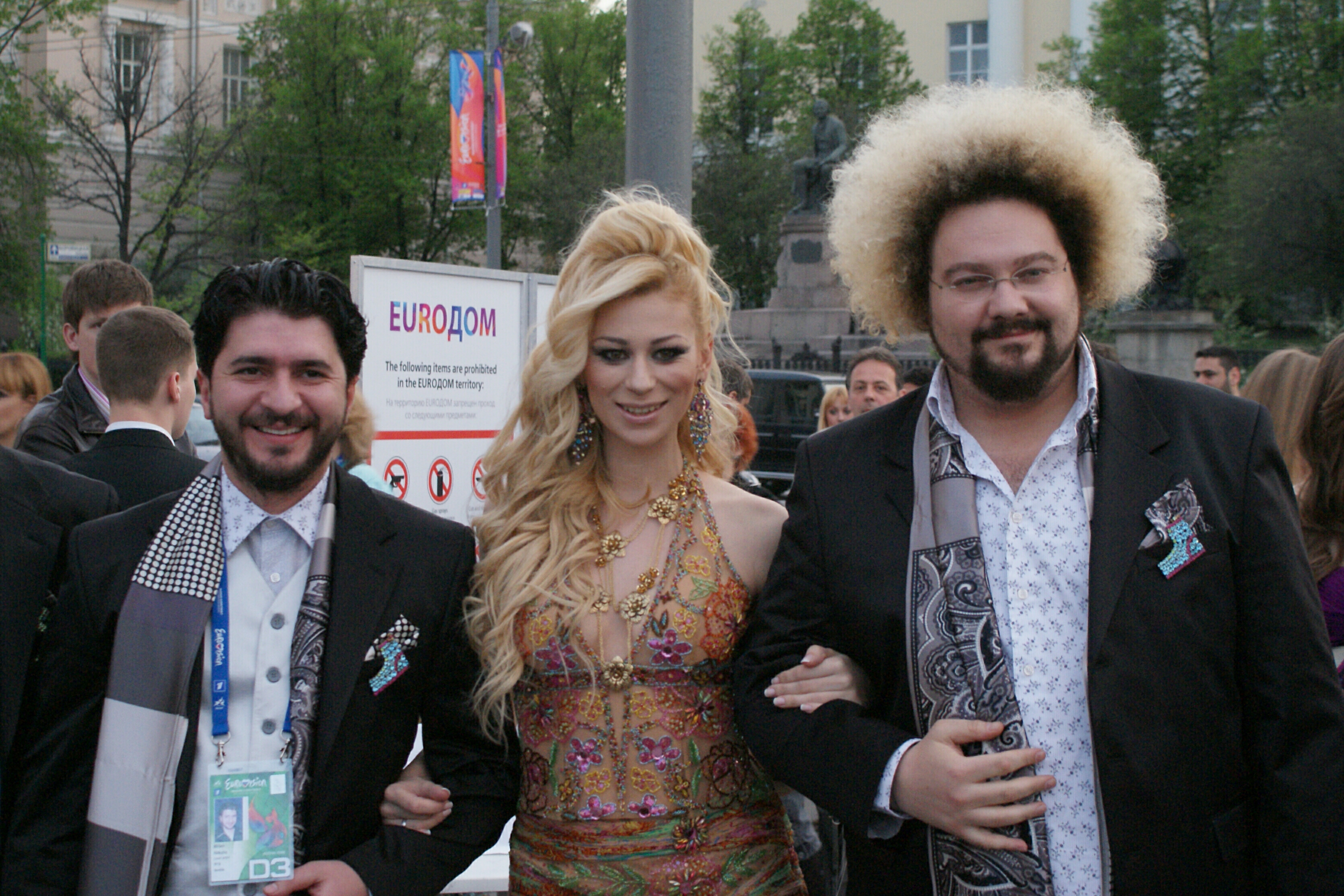
Marko Kon and Milaan at the Eurovision Opening Party in Moscow

According to Eurovision rules, all nations with the exceptions of the host country and the "Big Four" (France, Germany, Spain and the United Kingdom) are required to qualify from one of two semi-finals in order to compete for the final; the top nine songs from each semi-final as determined by televoting progress to the final, and a tenth was determined by back-up juries. The European Broadcasting Union (EBU) split up the competing countries into six different pots based on voting patterns from previous contests, with countries with favourable voting histories put into the same pot. On 30 January 2009, a special allocation draw was held which placed each country into one of the two semi-finals. Serbia was placed into the second semi-final, to be held on 14 May 2009. The running order for the semi-finals was decided through another draw on 16 March 2009 and Serbia was set to perform in position 4, following the entry from Latvia and before the entry from Poland.

The two semi-finals and the final were broadcast in Serbia on RTS 1 and RTS Sat with commentary for the first semi-final by Dragan Ilić and commentary for the second semi-final and final by Duška Vučinić-Lučić. RTS appointed Jovana Janković, who co-presented the Eurovision Song Contest 2008, as its spokesperson to announce the Serbian votes during the final.

=== Semi-final ===
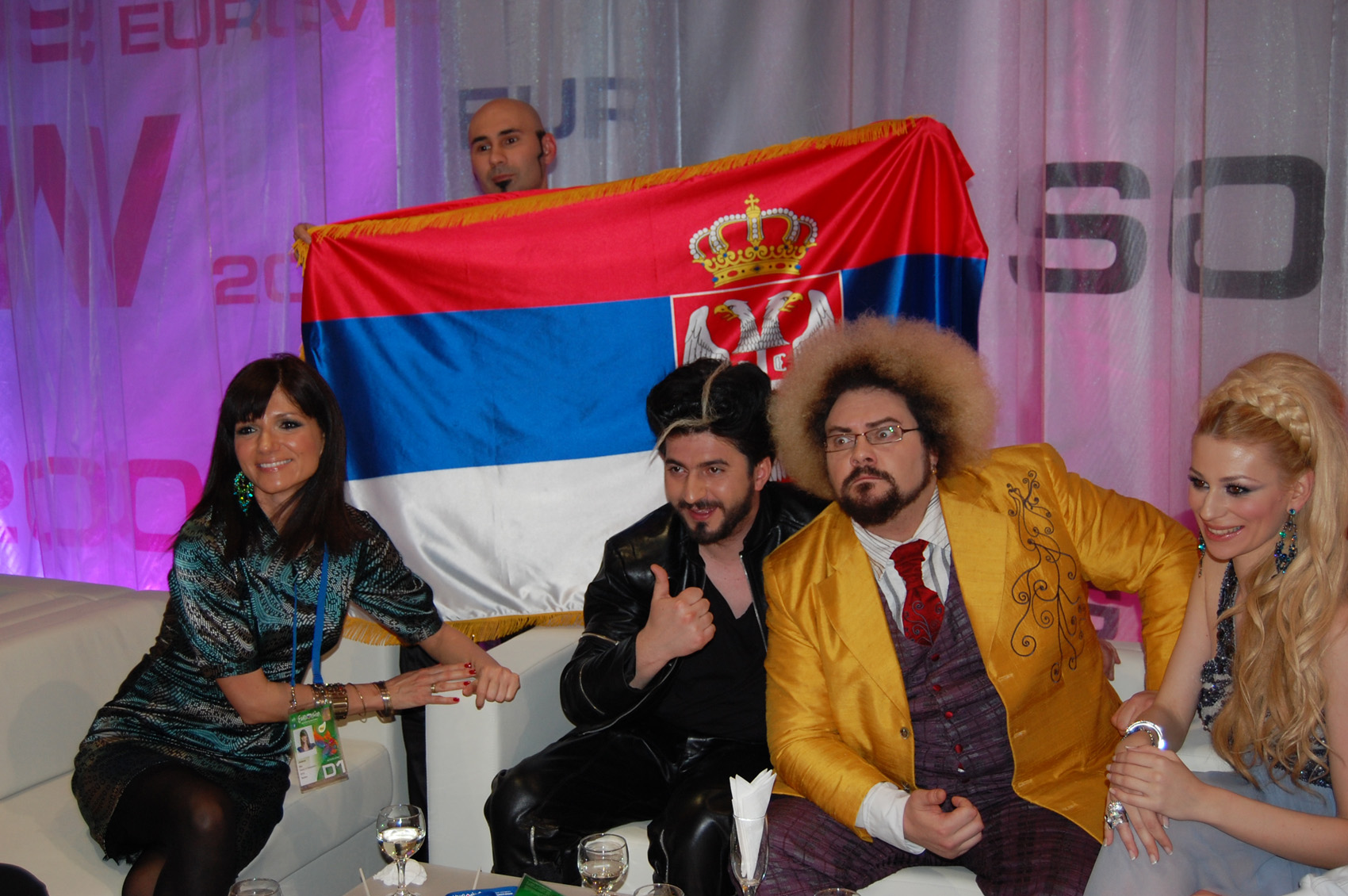
Marko Kon and Milaan during the second semi-final

Marko Kon and Milaan took part in technical rehearsals on 4 and 7 May, followed by dress rehearsals on 11 and 12 May. The Serbian performance featured Marko Kon in a yellow jacket and Milaan in a black leather costume performing together with three male pantomimes and a female dancer in a white tulle dress, who was lifted up in the air and dropped to the floor during the performance. The background LED screens displayed pixelated sketches of the performers' faces. The director of the Serbian performance was Mojca Horvat and the choreography was completed by Milan Gromilić. The three pantomimes that joined Marko Kon and Milaan on stage were: Ljubiša Dinčić, Igor Knežević and Jovan Sejnjanović. The female dancer was Katarina Gromilić.

At the end of the show, Serbia was not announced among the 10 qualifying entries in the second semi-final and therefore failed to qualify to compete in the final. This marked the first time that Serbia failed to qualify to the final of the Eurovision Song Contest from a semi-final since its first entry in 2007. It was later revealed that Serbia placed tenth in the semi-final, receiving a total of 60 points; and whilist it would have been enough to qualify in previous years, in 2008 and 2009 only the top nine places qualified automatically and the tenth place was decided based on the votes of the backup juries, and this time, juries chose Croatia to qualify over Serbia.

=== Voting ===
Voting during the three shows consisted of 50 percent public televoting and 50 percent from a jury deliberation. The jury consisted of five music industry professionals who were citizens of the country they represent. This jury was asked to judge each contestant based on: vocal capacity; the stage performance; the song's composition and originality; and the overall impression by the act. In addition, no member of a national jury could be related in any way to any of the competing acts in such a way that they cannot vote impartially and independently.

Below is a breakdown of points awarded to Serbia and awarded by Serbia in the second semi-final and grand final of the contest, and the breakdown of the jury voting and televoting conducted during the two shows:

==== Points awarded to Serbia ====
Points awarded to Serbia (Semi-final 2)
Score	Country
12 points	Croatia; France; Slovenia
10 points	
8 points	
7 points	
6 points	Netherlands
5 points	Greece; Spain
4 points	Cyprus
3 points	
2 points	Hungary; Norway
1 point	

==== Points awarded by Serbia ====
Points awarded by Serbia (Semi-final 2)
Score	Country
12 points	Croatia
10 points	Greece
8 points	Norway
7 points	Moldova
6 points	Azerbaijan
5 points	Slovenia
4 points	Estonia
3 points	Ireland
2 points	Cyprus
1 point	Ukraine

Points awarded by Serbia (Final)
Score	Country
12 points	Bosnia and Herzegovina
10 points	Norway
8 points	United Kingdom
7 points	Malta
6 points	Greece
5 points	Croatia
4 points	Azerbaijan
3 points	France
2 points	Romania
1 point	Denmark

==== Detailed voting results ====
The following members comprised the Serbian jury:

- Bilja Krstić – musician
- Jelena Tomašević – singer, represented Serbia in 2008
- Aleksandar Sedlar – musician
- Marko Đorđević – musician
- Vlada Maričić – musician

Detailed voting results from Serbia (Final)
R/O	Country	Results			Points
R/O	Country	Jury	Televoting	Combined	Points
01	Lithuania				
02	Israel	4		4	
03	France	6		6	3
04	Sweden				
05	Croatia	1	7	8	5
06	Portugal	3		3	
07	Iceland		2	2	
08	Greece		8	8	6
09	Armenia	2		2	
10	Russia		4	4	
11	Azerbaijan		6	6	4
12	Bosnia and Herzegovina	7	12	19	12
13	Moldova		1	1	
14	Malta	10		10	7
15	Estonia		3	3	
16	Denmark	5		5	1
17	Germany				
18	Turkey				
19	Albania				
20	Norway	8	10	18	10
21	Ukraine				
22	Romania		5	5	2
23	United Kingdom	12		12	8
24	Finland				
25	Spain				
