= Ukraine in the Eurovision Song Contest 2009 =

- Eurovision Song Contest 2009
- Participating broadcaster: National Television Company of Ukraine (NTU)
- Country: Ukraine
- Selection process: Yevrobachennia 2009 – Natsionalnyi vidbir
- Selection date: 8 March 2009

Competing entry
- Song: "Be My Valentine! (Anti-Crisis Girl)"
- Artist: Svetlana Loboda
- Songwriters: Evheniy Matyushenko; Svetlana Loboda

Placement
- Semi-final result: Qualified (6th, 80 points)
- Final result: 12th, 76 points

Participation chronology

Ukraine was represented at the Eurovision Song Contest 2009 with the song "Be My Valentine! (Anti-Crisis Girl)", written by Evheniy Matyushenko and Svetlana Loboda, and performed by Loboda herself. The Ukrainian participating broadcaster, the National Television Company of Ukraine (NTU), organised a national final in order to select its entry for the contest. The national selection consisted of a semi-final, held on 21 February 2009, and a final, held on 8 March 2009; thirty-one entries competed in the semi-final with the top fifteen advancing to the final. In the final, "Be My Valentine!" performed by Svetlana Loboda was selected as the winner following the combination of votes from a seven-member jury panel and a public televote. The song was later retitled as "Be My Valentine! (Anti-Crisis Girl)".

Ukraine was drawn to compete in the second semi-final of the Eurovision Song Contest which took place on 14 May 2009. Performing during the show in position 17, "Be My Valentine (Anti-Crisis Girl)" was announced among the 10 qualifying entries of the second semi-final and therefore qualified to compete in the final on 16 May. It was later revealed that Ukraine placed sixth out of the 19 participating countries in the semi-final with 80 points. In the final, Ukraine performed in position 21 and placed twelfth out of the 25 participating countries with 76 points.

== Background ==
Prior to the 2009 contest, the National Television Company of Ukraine (NTU) had participated in the Eurovision Song Contest representing Ukraine six times since its first entry in 2003, winning the contest in 2004 with the song "Wild Dances" performed by Ruslana. Following the introduction of semi-finals for the 2004, Ukraine had managed to qualify to final in every contest they participated in thus far. Ukraine had been the runner-up in the contest on two occasions: in 2007 with the song "Dancing Lasha Tumbai" performed by Verka Serduchka and in 2008 with the song "Shady Lady" performed by Ani Lorak. Ukraine's least successful result had been 19th place, achieved in 2005, with the song "Razom nas bahato" performed by GreenJolly.

As part of its duties as participating broadcaster, NTU organises the selection of its entry in the Eurovision Song Contest and broadcasts the event in the country. The broadcaster confirmed its intentions to participate at the 2009 contest on 3 November 2008. In the past, NTU had alternated between both internal selections and national finals in order to select its entry. Between 2005 and 2008, it had set up national finals to choose both or either the song and performer, with both the public and a panel of jury members involved in the selection. The method was continued to select its 2009 entry.

== Before Eurovision ==
=== Yevrobachennia 2009 – Natsionalnyi vidbir ===
The Ukrainian national final consisted of a semi-final held on 8 February 2009 and a final on 8 March 2009. Both shows were broadcast on Pershyi Natsionalnyi as well as online via NTU's official website 1tv.com.ua.

==== Format ====
The selection of the competing entries for the national final and ultimately the Ukrainian Eurovision entry took place over three stages. In the first stage, artists and songwriters had the opportunity to apply for the competition. Thirty-one acts were selected and announced on 28 January 2009. The second stage consisted of the televised semi-final which took place on 8 February 2009 with the thirty-one acts competing in the show. Fifteen acts were selected by an expert jury to advance from the semi-final. The third stage was the final, which took place on 8 March 2009 and featured the fifteen acts that qualified from the semi-finals vying to represent Ukraine in Moscow. The winner was selected via the 50/50 combination of votes from a public televote and an expert jury. Both the public televote and the expert jury assigned scores ranging from 1 (lowest) to 15 (highest) and the entry that had the highest number of points following the combination of these scores was declared the winner. Viewers participating in the public televote during the final had the opportunity to submit their votes for the participating entries via telephone or SMS. In the event of a tie, the tie was decided in favour of the entry that received the highest score from the jury.

==== Competing entries ====
Artists and composers had the opportunity to submit their entries between 3 November 2008 and 16 January 2009. A six-member selection panel consisting of Vasyl Ilashchuk (President of NTU), Roman Nedzelskyi (First Vice President of NTU), Andriy Chernyuk (Vice President of NTU), Yevhen Kalensky (Vice President of NTU), Serhiy Lapchenko (chief editor of music and entertainment at NTU) and Oleh Pylypchuk (director of music and entertainment at NTU) reviewed the 58 received submissions and shortlisted thirty-one entries to compete in the national final. On 28 January 2009, the thirty-one selected competing acts were announced. On 8 February 2009, VV and Nikole withdrew from the national final and were replaced by Ira Poison and Tabu.

==== Semi-final ====
The semi-final took place on 21 February 2009 at the NTU Studios in Kyiv, hosted by Timur Miroshnychenko. The show later aired on 21 February 2009. In the semi-final thirty-one acts competed and the top fifteen entries determined by an expert jury advanced to the final of the competition, while the remaining sixteen entries were eliminated. The jury panel that voted during the semi-final consisted of Vasyl Ilashchuk (President of NTU), Roman Nedzelskyi (First Vice President of NTU), Oleksandr Ponomaryov (singer, represented Ukraine in 2003), Serhiy Kuzin (CEO of Russian Radio Ukraine), Andriy Yeromin (choreographer), Volodymyr Bebeshko (composer) and Taras Petrynenko (composer and singer).

Semi-final – 8 February 2009
R/O	Artist	Song	Songwriter(s)	Result
1	Tori Joy	"Smile"	Viktoria Petryk, Andrey Tymoshchyk, N. Doncheva	Qualified
2	Goryachiy Shokolad	"Every Kiss"	Dmitry Klimashenko, Tetyana Reshetnyak	Qualified
3	Bagira	"Sexy Mama"	Iryna Bagley	—N/a
4	Solomia	"Not Perfect"	Olena Karpenko	—N/a
5	Tatyana Bryantseva	"Sweet and Sugar Baby"	Yaroslav Schogla, Iryna Mironova	Qualified
6	Maya	"Ty ne odin" (Ти не один)	Maya Yanchishin	—N/a
7	Andriy Knyaz	"Ne ydy" (Не иди)	Andriy Furdychko	—N/a
8	Zaklyopki	"Time Is Up"	Katya Komar, Sergiy Kabanets	Qualified
9	Nazar Savko	"Ty prosto slukhay" (Ти просто слухай)	Nazar Savko	—N/a
10	Nazad Shlyahu Nemae	"V ochah nebo" (В очах небо)	Dmitry Mitusov, Denis Nazarov	—N/a
11	Anastasia Prikhodko	"Za tebe znov" (За тебе знов)	Anastasia Prikhodko	—N/a
12	Natalia Volkova	"Gush"	Taras Panenko	Qualified
13	Zoryana	"Vklyuchayu Play" (Включаю Плей)	Zoryana Skirko	—N/a
14	4 Kings	"Tearin' Up My Heart"	Roman Polonskiy, Anna Rozina	Qualified
15	Gala	"Sly Lover"	Gennadiy Krupnik, Maryna Kursanova	—N/a
16	Svetlana Loboda	"Be My Valentine"	Evheniy Matyushenko, Svetlana Loboda	Qualified
17	Inna Oliynik	"I Don't Wanna Be Your Again"	Inna Oliynik	—N/a
18	Kishe	"Midnight"	Timofey Reshetko, Yevgeny Matyushenko	Qualified
19	Ana	"You're Like a Paradise"	Anna Zotyeva	Qualified
20	Eduard Romanyuta	"Silence"	Dmytro Tarasov, Oleksandra Malygina	—N/a
21	Vesta Kameneva	"My Devotion"	Yevhen Kryvoshlyk, Yulia Goncharova, Vesta Kameneva	—N/a
22	Inshiy Den	"U loni sniv" (У лоні снів)	Volodymyr Omelchenko, Andriy Stukalo	—N/a
23	Nikita	"Beauty Saves the World"	Roman Babenko, Jay B.	Qualified
24	Aleksandr Panayotov	"Superhero"	Taras Demchuk, Natalya Safonova	Qualified
25	Denis Barkanov	"You Are My Love and Pain"	Vyacheslav Batulin, Igor Kulik	Qualified
26	Ira Poison	"You Freed Me"	Sergey Pavlov	Qualified
27	Manya	"Fayna Ukraina" (Файна Юкрайна)	Alexandra Lushnikova	—N/a
28	Tabu	"You Are"	Tetyana Bubliy, Cyrkel Maksym	—N/a
29	Andriana	"Oberezhno" (Обережно)	Hristyna Bazar, Andriana Ryabets	—N/a
30	Godo	"Zagadaymo bazhannya" (Загадаймо бажання)	Pierpaolo Guerrini, David Mario Reyes, Yuriy Lukyanenko, Tatyana Ostrovskaya	Qualified
31	Lenara Osmanova	"Flash"	Zera Kengigaeva, Elmara Mustafaeva	Qualified

==== Final ====
The final took place on 8 March 2009 at the National Palace of Arts, hosted by Maria Orlova and Timur Miroshnychenko. "Beauty Saves the World" performed by Nikita was withdrawn prior to the final due to contractual restrictions. The remaining fourteen entries that qualified from the semi-final competed and the winner, "Be My Valentine" performed by Svetlana Loboda, was selected through the combination of votes from a public televote and an expert jury. Ties were decided in favour of the entries that received higher scores from the jury. The jury panel that voted during the final consisted of Vasyl Ilashchuk (President of NTU), Roman Nedzelskyi (First Vice President of NTU), Yevhen Kalensky (Vice President of NTU), Oleksandr Ponomaryov (singer, represented Ukraine in 2003), Serhiy Kuzin (CEO of Russian Radio Ukraine), Volodymyr Bebeshko (composer) and Taras Petrynenko (composer and singer). In addition to the performances of the competing entries, Irina Rosenfeld, Mika Newton, Nikita, Petr Elfimov (Belarus 2009), Sasha Son (Lithuania 2009), Lidia Kopania (Poland 2009), Jade Ewen (United Kingdom 2009), and Ruslana (Ukraine 2004) performed as guests.

Final – 8 March 2009
R/O	Artist	Song	Jury	Televote	Total	Place
1	Lenara	"Flash"	1	11	12	9
2	Goryachiy Shokolad	"Kiss"	8	5	13	8
3	Tetyana Bryantseva	"Sweet and Sugar Baby"	4	1	5	13
4	Denis Barkanov	"You Are My Love and Pain"	7	12	19	5
5	Zaklyopki	"Time Is Up"	13	9	22	2
6	Natalia Volkova	"Gush"	10	6	16	7
7	4 Kings	"Tearin' Up My Heart"	6	4	10	11
8	Ana	"You're Like a Paradise"	2	2	4	14
9	Svetlana Loboda	"Be My Valentine"	14	14	28	1
10	Godo	"Zagadaymo bazhannya"	3	8	11	10
11	~~Nikita~~	~~"Beauty Saves the World"~~	—	—	—	—
12	Aleksandr Panayotov	"Superhero"	9	13	22	4
13	Ira Poison	"You Freed Me"	12	10	22	3
14	Kishe	"Midnight"	5	3	8	12
15	Tori Joy	"Smile"	11	7	18	6

==== Controversy ====
Following the semi-final of the Ukrainian national final, Anastasia Prikhodko and her manager Olena Mozgova claimed that neither the NTU nor the jury had used trustworthy methods to choose the finalists; jury member Roman Nedzelskyi previously admitted that they did not select Prikhodko for the final as a Russian version of "Za tebe znov" had already been performed during the talent show Fabrika Zvyozd, despite the competition rules not specifying that the song performed during the semi-final should also be performed in the final. Anastasia Prikhodko would later enter and win the Russian national final with the song "Mamo", representing Russia at the 2009 Eurovision Song Contest and placing eleventh.

=== Preparation ===
"Be My Valentine" was retitled as "Be My Valentine! (Anti-Crisis Girl)" for the Eurovision Song Contest and featured new lyrics. The official music video, directed by Alan Badoev, was released on 16 March.

=== Promotion ===
Svetlana Loboda made several appearances across Europe to specifically promote "Be My Valentine! (Anti-Crisis Girl)" as the Ukrainian Eurovision entry. On 17 April, Loboda performed during the UKeurovision Preview Party, which was held at the La Scala venue in London, United Kingdom and hosted by Nicki French and Paddy O'Connell. On 18 April, Loboda performed during the Eurovision Promo Concert, which was held at the Café de Paris venue in Amsterdam, Netherlands and hosted by Marga Bult and Maggie MacNeal.

== At Eurovision ==
According to Eurovision rules, all nations with the exceptions of the host country and the "Big Four" (France, Germany, Spain and the United Kingdom) are required to qualify from one of two semi-finals in order to compete for the final; the top nine songs from each semi-final as determined by televoting progress to the final, and a tenth was determined by back-up juries. The European Broadcasting Union (EBU) split up the competing countries into six different pots based on voting patterns from previous contests, with countries with favourable voting histories put into the same pot. On 30 January 2009, a special allocation draw was held which placed each country into one of the two semi-finals. Ukraine was placed into the second semi-final, to be held on 14 May 2009. The running order for the semi-finals was decided through another draw on 16 March 2009. As one of the six wildcard countries, Ukraine chose to perform in position 17, following the entry from Albania and before the entry from Estonia.

In Ukraine, both the semi-finals and the final were broadcast on Pershyi Natsionalnyi with commentary by Timur Miroshnychenko. The Ukrainian spokesperson, who announced the Ukrainian votes during the final, was Marysya Horobets.

=== Semi-final ===
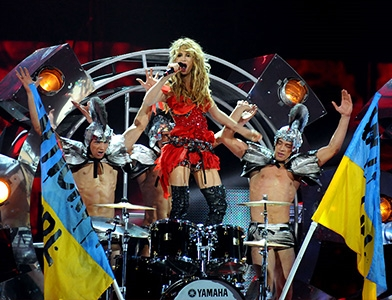
Svetlana Loboda during a rehearsal before the second semi-final

Svetlana Loboda took part in technical rehearsals on 6 and 10 May, followed by dress rehearsals on 13 and 14 May. The Ukrainian performance featured Loboda performing on stage in a red mini-dress designed by the singer herself together with three dancers and two backing vocalists. The stage featured a large mechanical device resembling three cog wheels with embedded lights as well as moving round metal ladders inside, known as the "Hell Machine". The performance began with the dancers moving from the inside onto the top of the "Hell Machine", and towards the end of the song Loboda moved to a platform with a drum set and two Ukrainian flags, during which she played the drums while being pulled across the stage by the dancers. Parts of the "Hell Machine", lips and Loboda's face appeared on the LED screens, while the performance also featured the use of smoke effects and fireworks. The stage director and choreographer for the Ukrainian performance was Alan Badoev, who also directed the music video for "Be My Valentine! (Anti-Crisis Girl)". The three dancers that joined Svetlana Loboda on stage were Andriy Mazurenko, Andriy Onyshchak and Dmytro Boboshko, while the two backing vocalists were Elena Kolyadenko and Iryna Krestinina.

At the end of the show, Ukraine was announced as having finished in the top ten and subsequently qualifying for the grand final. It was later revealed that Ukraine placed sixth in the semi-final, receiving a total of 80 points.

=== Final ===
Shortly after the second semi-final, a winners' press conference was held for the ten qualifying countries. As part of this press conference, the qualifying artists took part in a draw to determine the running order for the final. This draw was done in the order the countries appeared in the semi-final running order. Ukraine was drawn to perform in position 21, following the entry from Norway and before the entry from Romania.

Svetlana Loboda once again took part in dress rehearsals on 15 and 16 May before the final, including the jury final where the professional juries cast their final votes before the live show. Svetlana Loboda performed a repeat of her semi-final performance during the final on 16 May. At the conclusion of the voting, Ukraine finished in twelfth place with 76 points.

=== Voting ===
The voting system for 2009 involved each country awarding points from 1-8, 10 and 12, with the points in the final being decided by a combination of 50% national jury and 50% televoting. Each nation's jury consisted of five music industry professionals who are citizens of the country they represent. This jury judged each entry based on: vocal capacity; the stage performance; the song's composition and originality; and the overall impression by the act. In addition, no member of a national jury was permitted to be related in any way to any of the competing acts in such a way that they cannot vote impartially and independently.

Following the release of the full split voting by the EBU after the conclusion of the competition, it was revealed that Ukraine had placed twelfth with the public televote and sixteenth with the jury vote in the final. In the public vote, Ukraine scored 70 points, while with the jury vote, Ukraine scored 68 points.

Below is a breakdown of points awarded to Ukraine and awarded by Ukraine in the second semi-final and grand final of the contest. The nation awarded its 12 points to Azerbaijan in the semi-final and to Norway in the final of the contest.

==== Points awarded to Ukraine ====
Points awarded to Ukraine (Semi-final 2)
Score	Country
12 points	
10 points	Azerbaijan; Spain
8 points	Hungary; Moldova
7 points	Poland; Russia
6 points	Cyprus; Latvia; Slovakia
5 points	
4 points	
3 points	Estonia; Greece; Ireland
2 points	Lithuania
1 point	Serbia

Points awarded to Ukraine (Final)
Score	Country
12 points	
10 points	Azerbaijan; Poland
8 points	Hungary
7 points	
6 points	Belarus; Portugal; Spain
5 points	Czech Republic; Norway
4 points	Lithuania; Moldova
3 points	Armenia
2 points	Israel; Malta; Russia; United Kingdom
1 point	Slovakia

==== Points awarded by Ukraine ====
Points awarded by Ukraine (Semi-final 2)
Score	Country
12 points	Azerbaijan
10 points	Norway
8 points	Moldova
7 points	Estonia
6 points	Poland
5 points	Lithuania
4 points	Greece
3 points	Albania
2 points	Slovakia
1 point	Croatia

Points awarded by Ukraine (Final)
Score	Country
12 points	Norway
10 points	Azerbaijan
8 points	Russia
7 points	Moldova
6 points	United Kingdom
5 points	Denmark
4 points	Estonia
3 points	France
2 points	Armenia
1 point	Israel

==== Detailed voting results ====
The following members comprised the Ukrainian jury:

- Roman Nedzelskyi
- Oleksandr Ponomaryov
- Elena Zagorodnyuk
- Irina Rosenfeld
- Olexandr Zlotnik

Detailed voting results from Ukraine (Final)
R/O	Country	Results			Points
R/O	Country	Jury	Televoting	Combined	Points
01	Lithuania	3		3	
02	Israel	6		6	1
03	France	4	3	7	3
04	Sweden				
05	Croatia	2		2	
06	Portugal				
07	Iceland	1	4	5	
08	Greece				
09	Armenia		6	6	2
10	Russia		12	12	8
11	Azerbaijan	10	8	18	10
12	Bosnia and Herzegovina				
13	Moldova	5	5	10	7
14	Malta		1	1	
15	Estonia		7	7	4
16	Denmark	8		8	5
17	Germany				
18	Turkey				
19	Albania				
20	Norway	12	10	22	12
21	Ukraine				
22	Romania				
23	United Kingdom	7	2	9	6
24	Finland				
25	Spain				
