= Anastasia Prikhodko =

Ukrainian singer-songwriter and activist (born 1987)

- Анастасія Приходько
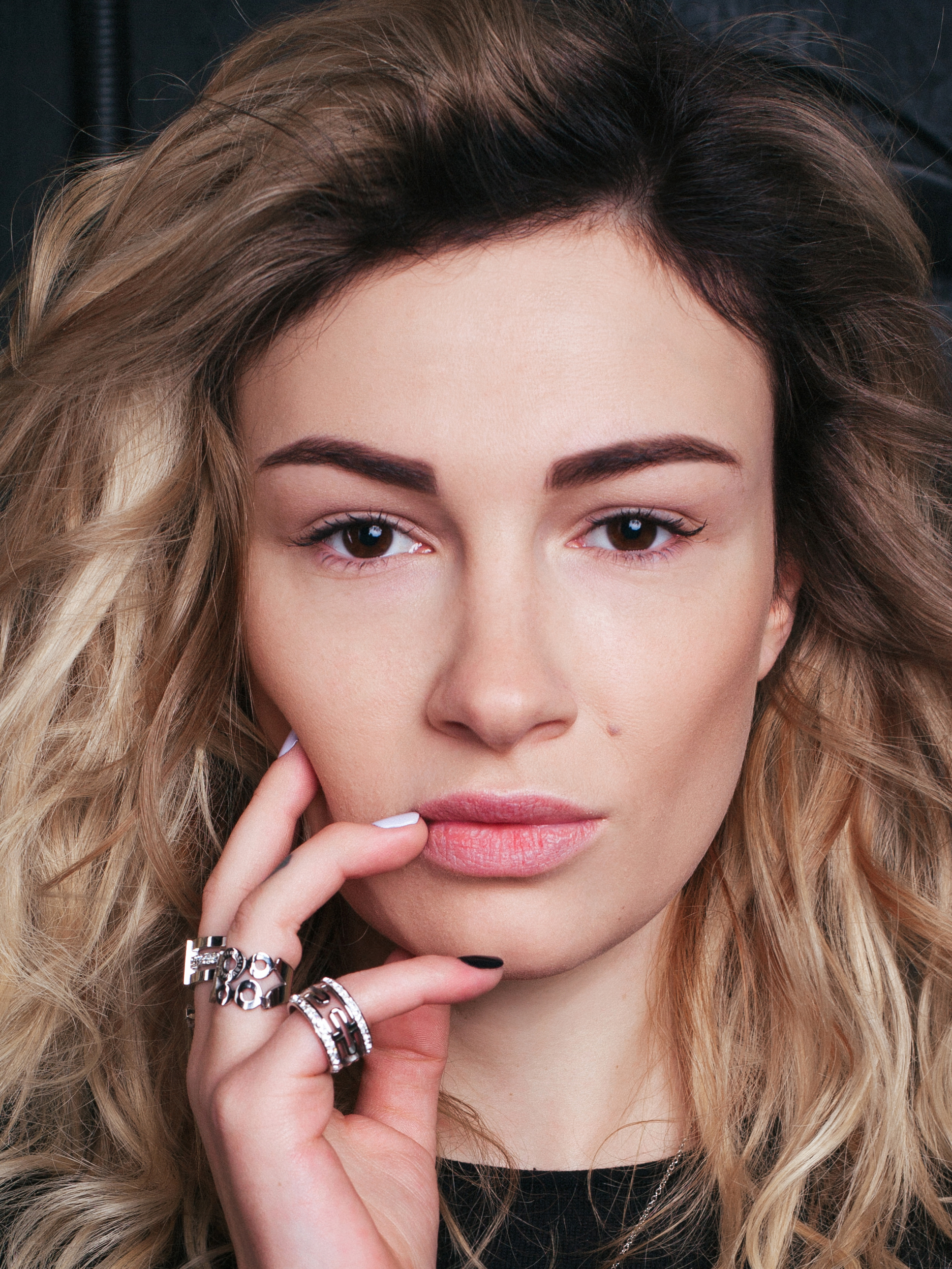
- Prikhodko in 2016

Personal details
- Born: Anastasia Kostyantynivna Prikhodko; 21 April 1987 (age 39) Kyiv, Ukrainian SSR, USSR
- Party: Fatherland
- Children: 3
- Education: Kyiv National University of Culture and Arts
- Occupation: Singer; songwriter; activist; politician
- Musical career
- Also known as: Anastasia Prykhodko
- Genres: Folk rock; pop; world; rock
- Years active: 2005 – present
- Label: Moon

Anastasia Kostyantynivna Prikhodko (Ukrainian: Анастасія Костянтинівна Приходько, romanized: Anastasiia Kostiantynivna Prykhodko; born 21 April 1987) is a Ukrainian singer-songwriter, activist, and former politician. Known for her deep contralto singing voice and blend of folk rock and pop music, Prikhodko made herself a major figure during Euromaidan and the 2014 pro-Russian unrest in Ukraine, expressing support for Ukrainian forces and vowing to never perform in Russia again.

Prikhodko first received mainstream attention in 2007, after winning series seven of the Russian music competition Fabrika Zvyozd. Her win led her to collaborate with Ukrainian-Russian producer Konstantin Meladze. In 2009, she represented Russia in the Eurovision Song Contest 2009 in Moscow with the song "Mamo", written by Meladze. Her participation in the competition came with a number of controversies following her disqualification from the Ukrainian national final and subsequent queries regarding the integrity of the judges and validity of the competition. Afterwards, she took part in the Russian national final and won; she went on to place 11th in the Eurovision final.

After ending her collaboration with Meladze in 2010, Prikhodko attempted to represent Ukraine in the Eurovision Song Contest on two more occasions: in 2011 and in 2016; she was a finalist in the former year, but was eliminated in the semi-finals in the latter year. Beginning in 2014, she became politically active as an activist for pro-Ukrainian forces and pro-Europeanism in Ukraine. In 2015, she declared that she would no longer perform in the Russian language. After announcing her departure from the music industry in October 2018, she disclosed that she had registered with Yulia Tymoshenko's party All-Ukrainian Union "Fatherland" to enter politics, and she unsuccessfully took part in the 2019 Ukrainian parliamentary election in Ukraine's 11th electoral district on behalf of the Fatherland party. She has since stated that she is no longer interested in a political career and has continued to release music.

== Early life and education ==
Prikhodko was born on 21 April 1987 in Kyiv to parents Konstantin Rybalov and Oksana Prikhodko. Her father, a Russian, is originally from Rostov-on-Don and worked as a miner, while her Ukrainian mother works as a theatre critic for the Ministry of Culture of Ukraine. Her parents have since separated, and Prikhodko was raised by her mother; her father returned to Russia after their separation. Prikhodko has an elder brother, Nazar, whom she has collaborated with in music. Prikhodko is additionally of partial Japanese ancestry, having a Japanese great-grandfather.

When she was 15, Prikhodko auditioned to join the Ukrainian girl group VIA Gra, but was rejected. She attended R. Glier Kyiv Institute of Music and Kyiv National University of Culture and Arts, studying folk vocals.

== Music career ==
=== 2005–2007: Breakthrough and Fabrika Zvyozd ===
After beginning her music career in 2005, Prikhodko first experienced mainstream success in 2007, after being cast in series seven of the Russian music competition Fabrika Zvyozd, an international version of the Spanish program Operación Triunfo. Prikhodko continued to advance through the competition until the finale, where she was declared the winner. Prikhodko garnered controversy during her participation in the show, after she was caught on film admitting to another contestant that she did not like Chinese people or black people, drawing accusations of racism. She immediately apologized for her comments.

Following her win in the competition, Prikhodko was signed to a contract by Ukrainian music producer Konstantin Meladze, who was a frequent guest on Fabrika Zvyozd. She has gone on to state that she did not enjoy being on reality television, and that her only friend during the experience was a member of the production crew. She released several singles in 2007, none of which managed to gain mainstream attention.

=== 2008–2013: Eurovision and Zazhdalas ===
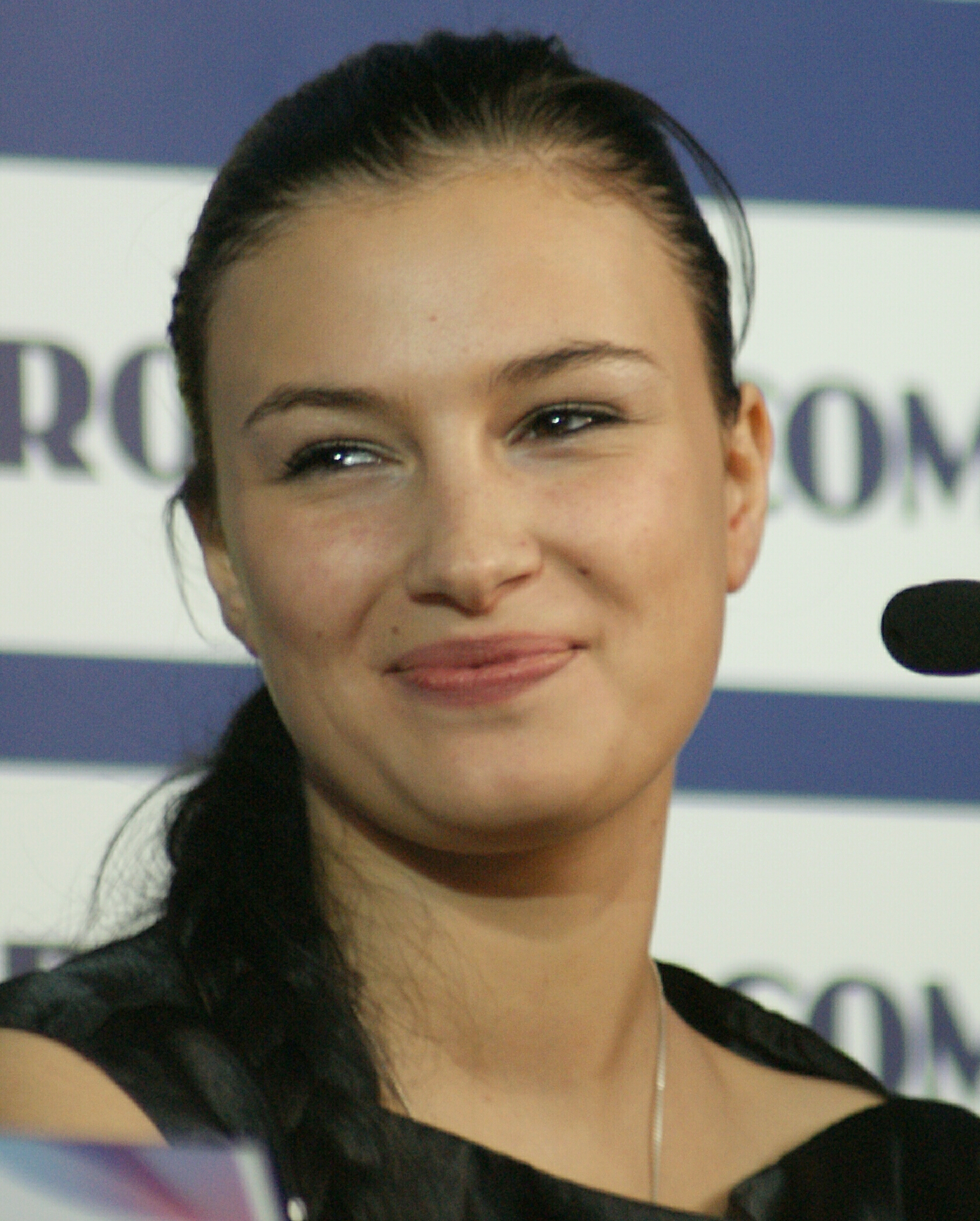
Prikhodko at a press conference for the Eurovision Song Contest 2009 in Moscow.

In 2008, Prikhodko released the single "Bezotvetno", a duet with Meladze's brother Valery Meladze. "Bezotvetno" went on to become Prikhodko's breakout hit, reaching the top forty in Russia. In January 2009, Prikhodko took part in the Ukrainian national final for the Eurovision Song Contest 2009. After frequent changes in plans, the Ukrainian competition was split into two rounds: a non-televised 30-song semi-final and a televised 15-song final. Prikhodko competed in the non-televised semi-final on 8 February 2009 with the song "Za tebe znov". After the semi-final ended, it was revealed that Prikhodko had not qualified to the final. Prikhodko responded to the results by stating that the Ukrainian broadcaster UA:PBC was not transparent in the selection of the finalists, calling their integrity into question. It later emerged that Prikhodko had not performed "Za tebe znov" in the semi-final, and was actually disqualified from the competition for performing the non-competing song "Vsyo dlya tebya". Prikhodko and her management stated that they were under the impression that the semi-final was simply a showcase of vocal capabilities, and that performing the potential Eurovision entry was not required. Prikhodko launched a formal complaint against the broadcaster for their handling of the event; their complaint was supported by Meladze in addition to the Ukrainian singers Sofia Rotaru, Mykola Mozhovyy, and Tina Karol. As a result of her complaint, the televised final was postponed by a Kyiv court. The court later ruled in Prikhodko's favor, but she allowed the televised final to go ahead.

Following the controversy with the Ukrainian national selection, Prikhodko instead applied for the Russian national final. The final's 15 competitors had already been decided, and Prikhodko's addition as an extra 16th competitor was controversial. After performing the song "Mamo", a bilingual entry in both the Ukrainian and Russian languages, she won the competition on 7 March 2009, winning both the public vote and jury vote. Following her win, allegations of vote rigging amongst the jury members arose, in addition to others complaining about a song in the Ukrainian language representing Russia in an international competition. Nevertheless, she remained the Russian representative in the Eurovision Song Contest 2009 in Moscow. Prikhodko became the second ever non-Russian to represent Russia in the competition; the first was Natalia Podolskaya, a Belarusian who represented Russia in 2005. As Russia was the host nation, Prikhodko was not required to compete in the semi-finals, and advanced directly to the final held on 16 May 2009. Her performance featured Prikhodko performing the song with a video of herself singing in the background, as she digitally aged from 20 to 70 years old. She ultimately placed eleventh in the competition, receiving a total score of 91 points. "Mamo" has gone on to become Prikhodko's most successful single.

After Eurovision, Prikhodko ended her professional partnership with Meladze in 2010. She subsequently began working with producer Igor Goncharenko that May, and has also worked with her elder brother Nazar. Later that year, she entered the Ukrainian national final for the Eurovision Song Contest 2011. Her entry was "Action", a techno song sung in English, a large departure from the previous folk rock music she had become known for. Prikhodko advanced from the fourth heat on 14 November 2010 as one of the three jury qualifiers. After advancing from the second semi-final on 12 December 2010 as well, she placed eighth in the final on 26 February 2011. Prikhodko's debut studio album Zazhdalas was released the following year.

=== 2014–2018: Pro-Ukrainian activity, Ya vilna, and retirement ===
Maidan Nezalezhnosti, where Prikhodko performed during the Euromaidan demonstrations in 2014

Following the beginning of Euromaidan in 2014, and the subsequent pro-Russian unrest in Ukraine, Russian military intervention, and Russian annexation of Crimea, Prikhodko became an outspoken advocate of Ukrainian sovereignty and support towards Ukrainian liberation from Russian influence. (Note: During the 2014 Crimean crisis, Ukraine lost control over Crimea, which was unilaterally annexed by Russia in March 2014. The status of Crimea and Sevastopol is currently under dispute by Ukraine and Russia; Ukraine and the majority of the international community consider Crimea an autonomous republic of Ukraine and Sevastopol one of Ukraine's cities with special status, while Russia, on the other hand, considers Crimea a federal subjects of Russia and Sevastopol one of its federal cities. The 2014 pro-Russian conflict in Ukraine created a separatist insurgency in the Donbas region of Eastern Ukraine (where several towns became under the control of armed pro-Russian forces) and insurgents declared several provinces unilateral independent.) During Euromaidan, Prikhodko performed at Maidan Nezalezhnosti and spoke in favor of European integration of Ukraine. In July 2014, Prikhodko went on tour with other Ukrainian musicians to support the Ukrainian Ground Forces during the War in Donbas. While on tour, Prikhodko posted on her Twitter account that Russians were "puppets", "narrow-minded", and "deaf". The following month, Prikhodko accused Russia of illegally occupying Ukrainian territory, and vowed to never perform another concert in Russia. Later in August, Prikhodko was profiled in the program 17 Friends of the Junta on Russian television channel NTV, which targeted critics of Russia's actions in Ukraine; the program was seen as a smear campaign. It depicted Prikhodko as an anti-Russian rebel, and included an interview with her estranged paternal grandmother who described her as a shame to the family, and Russian singer Joseph Kobzon stating that her Eurovision performance was disgraceful and that Prikhodko was a "street girl who swears like a prostitute". Prikhodko denounced the program, referring to it as "laughable". In 2015, Prikhodko revealed that refusing to perform concerts in Russia had been a major financial burden on her, as that was where a majority of her live performances were taking place and a large source of her income.

In 2015, Prikhodko vowed to begin prioritizing the Ukrainian language in her music, and that she would no longer perform in Russian. She went on to claim that this decision had cost her popularity, as Russian is the dominant language of the music industry throughout most of the post-Soviet states. In 2016, Prikhodko was announced as a competitor in the Ukrainian national final for the Eurovision Song Contest 2016, the inaugural edition of the Vidbir competition. Prikhodko competed in the first semi-final on 6 February 2016 with the song "I Am Free Now". She placed seventh in the semi-final, and did not qualify to the final. Her second studio album Ya vilna was released later that year. On 16 October 2018, Prikhodko announced through her Facebook that she had decided to end her musical career in order to enter politics.

=== 2019–present: return to music with Same toy and singles ===
In 2019, Prikhodko released her third studio album Same toy, her first to be fully in Ukrainian. Following this, she released standalone singles, beginning with "Podruha" in 2021. That same year, she participated in The Masked Singer Ukraine. She released three singles in 2022: "Stepom", "Zozulya", and "Holos narodu" (with Iksiy). Those were followed in 2024 by "Kholodno", a collaboration with Surov, and "Lyubila", a Ukrainian version of her 2009 Russian-language song. She stated that she had not wanted to re-record her Russian music in Ukrainian, but had made an exception for this song due to fan demand. 2025 saw the release of "Ne ydy" and "A tam", followed by "Pryrechena" in 2026.

== Artistry ==
Prikhodko has become known for her deep contralto vocal range. Due in part to her training as a folk vocalist, Prikhodko's repertoire consists of songs often in a minor key, inspired by genres such as folk rock and pop music. Initially, many of her songs were performed in the Russian language; she later began incorporating the Ukrainian language into her music, until swearing off performing in Russian completely in 2015. She has also performed in English. She has stated that she is not interested in translating her Russian-language songs into Ukrainian. Prikhodko composes some of her music herself, but often collaborates with other songwriters and producers. She plays the flute, guitar, and piano; Prikhodko has described the latter of the three as her favourite instrument. She pays close attention to criticism of her work, often trying to incorporate critiques and improve herself based on others' criticism.

== Political career ==
While active in the 2014 Euromaidan demonstrations, Prikhodko continuously stated that she was not interested in pursuing a career as a politician, instead preferring working as a musician and an activist. In 2015, Prikhodko identified herself with the Radical Party of Oleh Lyashko.

In October 2018, after announcing her retirement from music, Prikhodko revealed that she had registered with the All-Ukrainian Union "Fatherland" political party led by Yulia Tymoshenko, and would be pursuing a career in politics. She added that she was interested in seeking election to the Verkhovna Rada during the next parliamentary election. After the announcement of the July 2019 snap election, Prikhodko confirmed that she would run for parliament as a member of the Fatherland party, standing for election in one of the Ukrainian electoral constituencies, and confirmed that if she did not win a seat in parliament, she would still remain politically active and perhaps seek office again in the future. Prikhodko ultimately stood in the eleventh electoral district of Vinnytsia and did not win a seat in parliament; she placed eighth with 4.44% of the vote.

In July 2021, Prikhodko stated that she was "no longer interested in politics" and would continue her activism outside that framework, arguing that "politicians do everything for themselves, not for the people". In September 2026, she said that she was considering a return to politics and that she was interested in the position of minister of culture of Ukraine.

== Personal life ==
Prikhodko has been married twice. Her first husband was Abkhazian businessman Nurik Kukhilava. They first separated in 2011, later reconciled, and divorced in 2013. They had one daughter together. In 2013, she married an ex-schoolmate of hers named Oleksandr. They have two sons together, born in 2015 and in 2021.

Prikhodko has stated that her native language is Russian and that she began learning Ukrainian as an adult. While she has moved away from using the Russian language in her music and no longer performs her Russian songs, she continues to speak Russian in her personal life; she calls it "Kyiv Russian" and has compared it to the differences between American and British English. She is raising her children bilingually. Her comments on "Kyiv Russian" sparked controversy in Ukraine and led to the cancellation of a concert in Chernivtsi in April 2026.

== Discography ==
=== Albums ===
| Title | Details |
|---|---|
| Zazhdalas | Released: 18 October 2012; Label: Moon Records Ukraine; Format: CD, digital download |
| Ya vilna | Released: 21 April 2016; Label: Moon Records Ukraine; Format: CD, digital download |
| Same toy | Released: 13 December 2019; Label: Moon Records Ukraine; Format: digital download |

=== Singles ===
| Title | Year | Album |
|---|---|---|
| "Tri zimy" | 2007 | Zazhdalas |
| "Vera" | 2007 | Non-album single |
| "Vsyo za tebya" | 2007 | Zazhdalas |
| "Bezotvetno" (featuring Valery Meladze) | 2008 | Zazhdalas |
| "Mamo" | 2009 | Zazhdalas |
| "Lyubila" | 2009 | Zazhdalas |
| "Vspykhnet svet" | 2010 | Zazhdalas |
| "Tvoyo serdtse" (featuring Pasha Li) | 2010 | Ya vilna |
| "Po volnam" | 2010 | Zazhdalas |
| "Yasnovidyashchya" | 2010 | Zazhdalas |
| "Action" | 2010 | Zazhdalas |
| "Mezhdu nami nebo" (featuring David) | 2011 | Zazhdalas |
| "Smogla" | 2011 | Zazhdalas |
| "Zazhdalas" | 2011 | Zazhdalas |
| "Romans" | 2012 | Ya vilna |
| "Nika" | 2012 | Ya vilna |
| "Polovina puti" | 2014 | Ya vilna |
| "Heroyi ne vmyrayut" (featuring Mykyta Rubchenko) | 2014 | Ya vilna |
| "Zatselovana" | 2015 | Ya vilna |
| "Ne tragediya" | 2015 | Ya vilna |
| "Ya vilna" | 2016 | Ya vilna |
| "I Am Free Now" | 2016 | Ya vilna |
| "Dura-lyubov" | 2016 | Ya vilna |
| "Luna-nostalhiya" | 2016 | Same toy (Note: Under the title "Luna") |
| "Ya pidu za sontsem" | 2016 | Non-album single |
| "Trymay" | 2016 | Same toy |
| "Goodbye" | 2017 | Same toy |
| "Kryla" | 2017 | Same toy |
| "Same toy" | 2018 | Same toy |
| "Vymahayu zmin" | 2019 | Same toy |
| "Podruha" | 2021 | Non-album singles |
| "Stepom" | 2022 | Non-album singles |
| "Zozulya" | 2022 | Non-album singles |
| "Holos narodu" (with Iksiy) | 2022 | Non-album singles |
| "Kholodno" (with Surov) | 2024 | Non-album singles |
| "Lyubila" (Ukrainian version) | 2024 | Non-album singles |
| "Na vitrakh" | 2024 | Non-album singles |
| "Allo" | 2024 | Same toy |
| "Ne ydy" | 2025 | Non-album single |
| "Vilnyy ptakh" | 2025 | Same toy |
| "A tam" | 2025 | Non-album single |
| "Pryrechena" | 2026 | Non-album single |

== Notes ==
Awards and achievements
| Preceded by Dmitry Koldun | Star Factory (Russia) winner 2008 | Succeeded by Victoria Dayneko |
| Preceded by Dima Bilan with "Believe" | Russia in the Eurovision Song Contest; 2009 | Succeeded by Peter Nalitch with "Lost and Forgotten" |
