= Greece in the Eurovision Song Contest 2009 =

- Eurovision Song Contest 2009
- Participating broadcaster: Hellenic Broadcasting Corporation (ERT)
- Country: Greece
- Selection process: Artist: Internal selection Song: Ellinikós Telikós 2009
- Selection date: Artist: 15 July 2008; Song: 18 February 2009

Competing entry
- Song: "This Is Our Night"
- Artist: Sakis Rouvas
- Songwriters: Dimitris Kontopoulos; Craig Porteils; Cameron Giles-Webb

Placement
- Semi-final result: Qualified (4th, 110 points)
- Final result: 7th, 120 points

Participation chronology

Greece was represented at the Eurovision Song Contest 2009 with the song "This Is Our Night", composed by Dimitris Kontopoulos, with lyrics by Craig Porteils and Cameron Giles-Webb, and performed by Sakis Rouvas. The Greek participating broadcaster, the Hellenic Broadcasting Corporation (ERT), organised the national final Ellinikós Telikós 2009 to select its entry for the contest, after having previously selected Rouvas internally. The televised national final consisted of three candidate songs voted upon by the public and a jury.

Following the selection of the song, Rouvas began to travel around Europe and appeared on many television shows, including events held by other participants in the contest. Greece took part in the second semi-final of the contest on 14 May 2009 and qualified for the final, placing fourth with 110 points. At the final on 16 May, Rouvas performed "This Is Our Night" eighth out of the 25 participants and at the end of voting, was awarded seventh place, marking Greece's sixth consecutive top 10 placing since 2004.

== Background ==
Prior to the 2009 contest, Greece had participated in the Eurovision Song Contest 29 times since its first entry in 1974. To this point, they won the contest once, in 2005 with the song "My Number One" performed by Helena Paparizou, and placed third three times: in 2001 with the song "Die for You" performed by the duo Antique; in 2004 with "Shake It" performed by Sakis Rouvas; and in 2008 with "Secret Combination" performed by Kalomira. Following the introduction of semi-finals for the 2004 contest, Greece qualified for the final each year. Their least successful result was in 1998, when they placed 20th with the song "Mia krifi evaisthisia" by Thalassa, receiving only twelve points in total, all from Cyprus.

As part of its duties as participating broadcaster, the Hellenic Broadcasting Corporation (ERT) organises the selection of its entry in the Eurovision Song Contest and broadcasts the event in the country. From 2004 to 2006, ERT had selected high-profile artists internally and set up national finals to choose the song, while in 2007 and 2008 it held a televised national final to choose both the song and performer. For the 2009 contest, ERT was able to secure a high-profile artist once again and planned a national final to choose the song.

== Before Eurovision ==
=== Artist selection ===
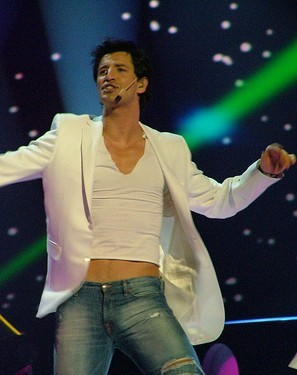
Sakis Rouvas, shown representing Greece in 2004, was once again selected as their representative.

On 15 July 2008, ERT confirmed Rouvas as the Greek representative for the Eurovision Song Contest 2009. Rouvas had previously represented Greece in 2004, placing third, and had hosted the Eurovision Song Contest 2006 in the Greek capital Athens alongside Maria Menounos. ERT's Eurovision project manager Johnny Kalimeris stated that Rouvas' participation was announced so early because "there was no reason to keep it a secret [and that] it was about to leak [so they] decided to make a short announcement early on to avoid the usual speculations and rumours which could do more damage than good". Rouvas' selection made Greece the first nation to publicly announce their entrant for the 2009 contest.

=== Ellinikós Telikós 2009 ===
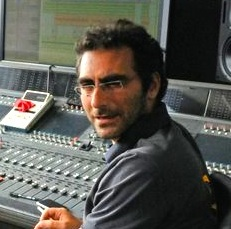
Dimitris Kontopoulos was the composer for all three songs.

Following the announcement of Rouvas as their Eurovision Song Contest 2009 representative, ERT revealed during a press conference on 14 October 2008 that he would perform three songs, all written by Dimitris Kontopoulos and choreographed by Fokas Evangelinos, during a national final titled Ellinikós Telikós 2009 (Greek: Ελληνικός Τελικός, "Greek final"). In regards to the style of the songs, Rouvas stated that he trusted Kontopoulos as he had written many hits for him in the past and knew the styles of songs that fit him best. The titles of the three songs were announced on 10 February 2009 and the songs in their entirety were presented during a press conference two days later at the Hilton Athens hotel. Alexandra Zakka wrote the lyrics for the first song, titled "Out of Control", a pop song with R&B elements, while Craig Porteils and Cameron Giles-Webb wrote the lyrics for both "Right On Time", a mid-tempo song, and "This Is Our Night", a dance song. Craig Porteils is a Greek Australian music producer who has written songs and lyrics for Cher, Billy Idol, Tevin Campbell, Guns N' Roses, Rod Stewart and Ozzy Osbourne among others, while Cameron Giles-Webb is another Greek Australian music producer who was the head of Gusto Music.

==== Final ====
The final took place on 18 February 2009 at the Athinon Arena Music Hall in Athens, hosted by Betty and Mathilde Maggira. The show was directed by Giorgos Kapoutzidis and televised on ERT's NET channel as well as online via eurovision.ert.gr and the official Eurovision Song Contest website eurovision.tv. Elias Ledakis served as set designer, Giorgos Segredakis was responsible for the costume designs and Evangelinos served as the producer, choreographer and artistic supervisor of the evening. The show had a main concept of Eurovision history and included a flashback to the Eurovision world from the contest's origins in 1956 to the present. Rouvas performed all three songs and the winning song, "This Is Our Night", was selected by a combination of public voting (60%) and jury voting (40%). The jury consisted of Mimis Plessas (composer and jury president), Dimitris Gontikas (General Manager of ERT Television), Antonis Andrikakis (lyricist and General Manager of ERT Radio), Evangelia Piskera (Director of ERT Public Relations), Olga Pavlatou (record executive), Giorgos Kyvelos (record producer) and a seventh press vote by Stella Floras consisting of the results from a poll conducted by Eurovision news website ESCToday that featured international Eurovision fans. Only the winning song "This is Our Night" was announced, though ESCToday later revealed their portion of the vote as "This Is Our Night" with 61.18%, "Out of Control" with 25.88% and "Right on Time" with 12.94%.

In addition to the performances of the competing entries, the interval acts featured guest performances by Eurovision Song Contest 2009 participants Petr Elfimov (Belarus), Christina Metaxa (Cyprus), Chiara (Malta), Andrea Demirović (Montenegro), Hadise (Turkey), and Jade Ewen (United Kingdom), as well as Kalomira, who represented Greece in 2008.

Results of Ellinikós Telikós 2009 – 18 February 2009
R/O	Song	Songwriter(s)
1	"Out of Control"	Dimitris Kontopoulos, Alexandra Zakka
2	"Right On Time"	Dimitris Kontopoulos, Craig Porteils, Cameron Giles-Webb
3	"This Is Our Night"	Dimitris Kontopoulos, Craig Porteils, Cameron Giles-Webb

=== Promotion ===
Following the national final, initial plans for an extensive promotional tour for "This Is Our Night" were announced. The first official stop after the selection was to Bosnia and Herzegovina where Rouvas performed at the official presentation of their entry "Bistra Voda" on 1 March 2009. Other guests included Turkey and Malta. Rouvas was then a guest at the Pink TV BH Morning Show which aired live on Balkan Net, and also appeared on the live radio show Stari Grad. He also gave interviews to TV Hayat, the Obavezan smjer show on TV Sarajevo, and on the Radio Televizija BiH show Konacno petak. Following his two-day stay in Bosnia and Herzegovina, Rouvas returned to Belgrade, Serbia, where he would stay until 4 March 2009, appearing on Fox TV, Radio S, TV S, TV Avala and Pink TV. On 4 March he was a special guest of Jovana Janković, the hostess of the Eurovision Song Contest 2008, on the RTS Morning Show. Rouvas concluded his promotion in Serbia with a live appearance on Novi SAT channel. Rouvas then flew to Moscow, where he performed live at the Russian National Final along with past Russian representatives, namely Dima Bilan, Yulia Savicheva, Alsou, Youddiph, Natalia Podolskaya, Prime Minister, and Serebro. The next day he performed at the Kremlin for the celebration of International Women's Day in Russia. Rouvas also appeared at a concert in Cyprus on 13 March 2009 and continued promotion in Turkey from 10 to 12 April.

A music video for "This is Our Night" was also released to promote the entry. The video was directed by Ukrainian Katya Tsaryk and choreographed by Fokas Evangelinos. Filming took place over a period of two days, concluding on 24 February 2009. Filming locations included the Starz club and King George hotel as well as outdoor locations around Athens.

== At Eurovision ==
The Eurovision Song Contest 2009 took place at the Olympic Stadium in Moscow, Russia and consisted of two semi-finals held on 12 and 14 May, respectively, and the final on 16 May 2009. According to the Eurovision rules, all participating countries, except the host nation and the "Big Four", consisting of France, Germany, Spain, and the United Kingdom, were required to qualify from one of the two semi-finals to compete for the final; the top 10 countries from the respective semi-finals progressed to the final of the contest. On 30 January 2009, an allocation draw was held that placed each country into one of the two semi-finals, with Greece being placed into the second semi-final, to be held on 14 May. Once all the competing songs for the contest had been released, the running order for the semi-finals was decided by the delegation heads of the 42 participating countries; Greece was set to perform 13th in the field of 19, following Azerbaijan and preceding Lithuania. The two semi-finals and the final were broadcast in Greece on ERT with television commentary by the Maggira sisters and radio commentary by Maria Kozakou.

=== Performances ===
Fokas Evangelinos and Elias Ledakis were the choreographers and artistic directors of Rouvas' stage show. Evangelinos had choreographed Rouvas' third place in 2004, Helena Paparizou's winning entry in 2005, the opening ceremony of the Eurovision Song Contest 2006, Ani Lorak's second place for Ukraine in 2008, and Dima Bilan's second place for Russia in 2006 and his winning entry in 2008 among others. The performance included complex choreography, with Richard Galpin of BBC News remarking that "Greece's Sakis Rouvas had one of the more ambitious dance routines" of the contest. Rouvas performed on a rotating podium which transported him from left to right across the stage and partook in a group dance routine with four other performers, who in the end, were responsible for lifting him into the air. As he was lifted, a Greek flag was displayed on the floor, only visible to the television viewers. The final part of the performance was completed by silver fireworks in two separate parts. The EBU noted that Greece had made "high-tech advancements" in the contest's standards based on the year's performance.

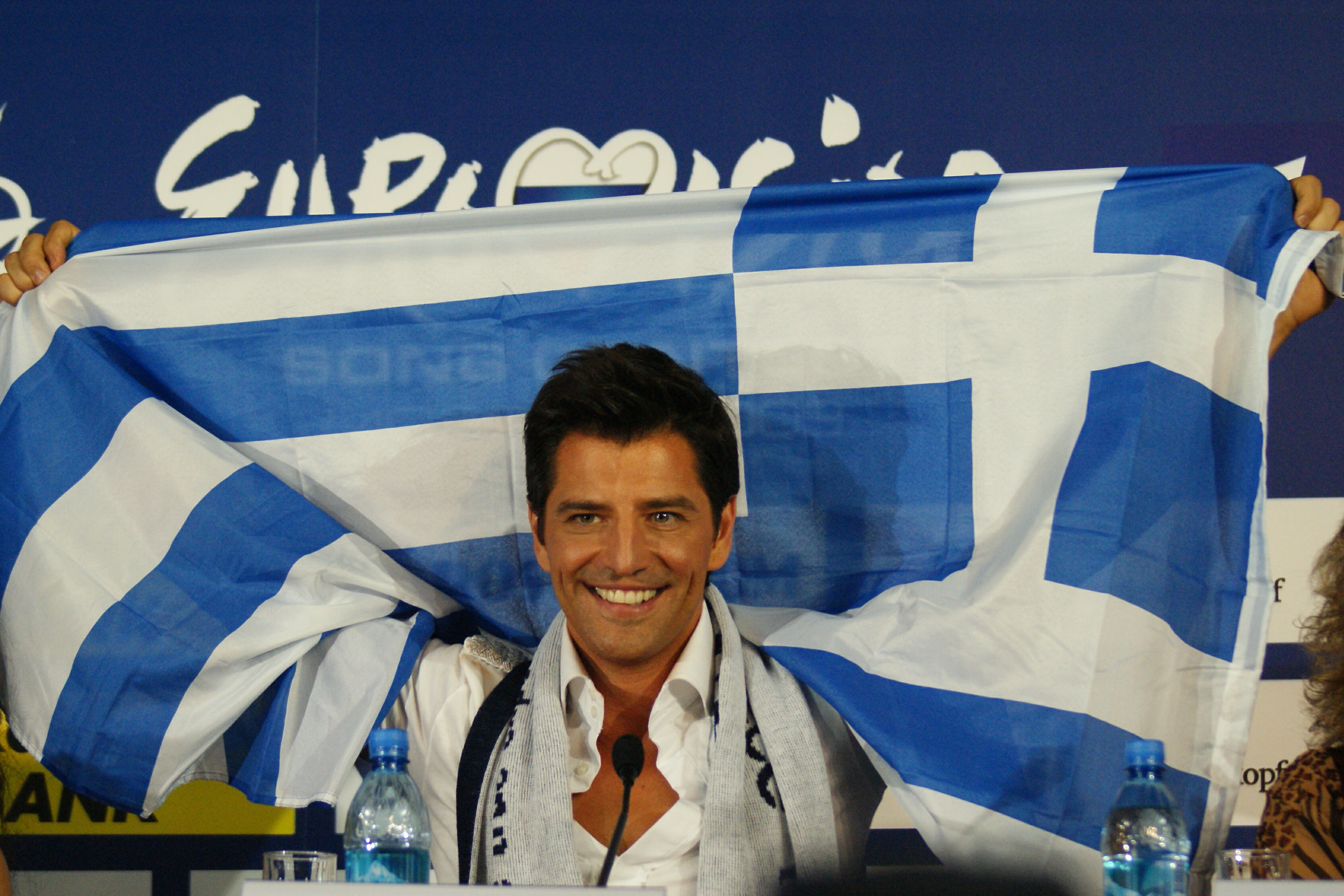
Rouvas raising the Greek flag during the press conference after the semi-final.

After the semi-final, "This is Our Night" was one of the 10 performances which qualified for the final. The nation finished in fourth place, receiving 110 points. BBC News noted that bookmakers Ladbrokes showed the song as being a likely second place finisher behind Norway. In the final, on 16 May 2009, "This Is Our Night" was performed eighth in the running order out of the 25 participants. At the end of the voting phase, the nation finished in seventh place with a total of 120 points, receiving maximum 12 points from Albania, Bulgaria and Cyprus. The song therefore carried on Greece's Eurovision success by finishing within the top-ten for the sixth consecutive year. The event was watched by 86% of the Greek television audience.

Whilst Rouvas was disappointed with his seventh-place finish, announcing to Greek media "I am so sorry, I wanted us to win", there was still support towards the artist himself in the country. "Seventh in Europe, first in our hearts", many journalists reported on Greek television. The media and public pronounced their support for Rouvas, the general consensus being that the artist gave it his best even though this did not translate in enough votes in the contest. Rouvas stated that, overall, it was a wonderful experience for him: "Some win, some lose, personally, I gave everything I had. But it was a wonderful experience." Some critics, including those from Global Greek Radio, suggested the reason why Greece failed to achieve a higher placing was due to a lack of an ethnic-sounding song. They noted the way in which all of Greece's top-three placings, including Rouvas' performance of "Shake It" in 2004, had an ethnic bouzouki sound, as did the 2009 Azerbaijani and Turkish entries which finished in third and fourth place respectively.

=== Voting ===
Voting during the three shows involved each country awarding points from 1-8, 10 and 12 as determined by televoting in the semi-final and a combination of 50% national jury and 50% televoting in the final. Each nation's jury consisted of five music industry professionals who are citizens of the country they represent. This jury judged each entry based on: vocal capacity; the stage performance; the song's composition and originality; and the overall impression by the act. In addition, no member of a national jury was permitted to be related in any way to any of the competing acts in such a way that they cannot vote impartially and independently. Greece received the top 12 points from Albania and Cyprus in the second semi-final, and from Albania, Bulgaria and Cyprus in the final. Greece awarded its 12 points to Cyprus in the semi-final and to the UK in the final. The tables below visualise a complete breakdown of points awarded to Greece in both the second semi-final and the final of the Eurovision Song Contest 2009, as well as by the country on both occasions.

==== Points awarded to Greece ====
Points awarded to Greece (Semi-final 2)
Score	Country
12 points	Albania; Cyprus
10 points	Netherlands; Serbia
8 points	
7 points	
6 points	France; Hungary; Moldova; Spain
5 points	Estonia; Slovakia
4 points	Azerbaijan; Latvia; Lithuania; Russia; Slovenia; Ukraine
3 points	Croatia
2 points	Denmark; Poland
1 point	Norway

Points awarded to Greece (Final)
Score	Country
12 points	Albania; Bulgaria; Cyprus
10 points	Armenia
8 points	Romania
7 points	Croatia; Malta
6 points	Germany; Serbia
5 points	Belarus; Belgium; Bosnia and Herzegovina; United Kingdom
4 points	Hungary; Russia; Slovenia
3 points	
2 points	Montenegro; Sweden; Switzerland
1 point	Netherlands; Spain

==== Points awarded by Greece ====
Points awarded by Greece (Semi-final 2)
Score	Country
12 points	Cyprus
10 points	Albania
8 points	Norway
7 points	Azerbaijan
6 points	Moldova
5 points	Serbia
4 points	Estonia
3 points	Ukraine
2 points	Denmark
1 point	Poland

Points awarded by Greece (Final)
Score	Country
12 points	United Kingdom
10 points	Norway
8 points	Azerbaijan
7 points	Albania
6 points	France
5 points	Estonia
4 points	Iceland
3 points	Turkey
2 points	Croatia
1 point	Spain

==== Detailed voting results ====
Detailed voting results from Greece (Final)
R/O	Country	Results			Points
R/O	Country	Jury	Televoting	Combined	Points
01	Lithuania				
02	Israel				
03	France	10		10	6
04	Sweden				
05	Croatia	7		7	2
06	Portugal				
07	Iceland	8		8	4
08	Greece				
09	Armenia		4	4	
10	Russia				
11	Azerbaijan	4	8	12	8
12	Bosnia and Herzegovina				
13	Moldova		1	1	
14	Malta	5		5	
15	Estonia	6	3	9	5
16	Denmark	2		2	
17	Germany	1		1	
18	Turkey		7	7	3
19	Albania		10	10	7
20	Norway	3	12	15	10
21	Ukraine				
22	Romania		2	2	
23	United Kingdom	12	5	17	12
24	Finland				
25	Spain		6	6	1
