= Spain in the Eurovision Song Contest 2009 =

- Eurovision Song Contest 2009
- Participating broadcaster: Radiotelevisión Española (RTVE)
- Country: Spain
- Selection process: Eurovisión 2009: El retorno
- Selection date: 28 February 2009

Competing entry
- Song: "La noche es para mí"
- Artist: Soraya
- Songwriters: Irini Michas; Dimitri Stassos; Jason Gill; Felipe Pedroso

Placement
- Final result: 24th, 23 points

Participation chronology

Spain was represented at the Eurovision Song Contest 2009 with the song "La noche es para mí", written by Irini Michas, Dimitri Stassos, Jason Gill, and Felipe Pedroso, and performed by Soraya. The Spanish participating broadcaster, Radiotelevisión Española (RTVE), organised the national final Eurovisión 2009: El retorno in order to select its entry for the contest. The national final consisted of three semi-finals and a final and involved 30 artists and songs. Ten entries ultimately qualified to compete in the televised final where an in-studio jury and a public televote selected "La noche es para mí" performed by Soraya as the winner.

As a member of the "Big Four", Spain automatically qualified to compete in the final of the Eurovision Song Contest. Performing as the closing entry during the show in position 25, Spain placed twenty-fourth out of the 25 participating countries with 23 points.

== Background ==
Prior to the 2009 contest, Televisión Española (TVE) until 2006, and Radiotelevisión Española (RTVE) since 2007, had participated in the Eurovision Song Contest representing Spain forty-eight times since TVE's first entry in 1961. They have won the contest on two occasions: in 1968 with the song "La, la, la" performed by Massiel and in 1969 with the song "Vivo cantando" performed by Salomé, the latter having won in a four-way tie with France, the Netherlands, and the United Kingdom. They have also finished second four times, with "En un mundo nuevo" by Karina in 1971, "Eres tú" by Mocedades in 1973, "Su canción" by Betty Missiego in 1979, and "Vuelve conmigo" by Anabel Conde in 1995. In the 2008, RTVE placed 16th with the song "Baila el Chiki-chiki" performed by Rodolfo Chikilicuatre.

As part of its duties as participating broadcaster, RTVE organises the selection of its entry in the Eurovision Song Contest and broadcasts the event in the country. RTVE confirmed its intentions to participate at the 2009 contest on 21 November 2008. In 2007 and 2008, RTVE organised a national final featuring a competition among several artists and songs to select both the artist and song that would represent Spain, a procedure which was continued for their 2009 entry.

== Before Eurovision ==
=== Eurovisión 2009: El retorno ===
Eurovisión 2009: El retorno was the national final organised by RTVE that took place at the Casino l'Aliança del Poblenou Theatre in Barcelona, hosted by Alaska and Miguel Serrano. The national final consisted of four shows which commenced on 14 February 2009 and concluded with a winning song and artist during the final on 28 February 2009. All shows were broadcast on La 1, TVE Internacional, as well as online via RTVE's official website rtve.es.

==== Format ====
Thirty artists and songs, selected through an Internet round, competed in Eurovisión 2009: El retorno which consisted of four shows: three semi-finals on 14, 21 and 28 February 2009, and the final also on 28 February 2009. Each semi-final featured ten entries and four qualified for the final. The twelve qualifying entries competed in the final during which the winning entry was determined. The initial format of the national final also included a Second Chance round which would feature the fourth-placed songs of each semi-final (the top three entries would directly qualify for the final from each semi-final), however the show was later removed due to low ratings of the first two semi-finals and for the purpose of aiding the winning artist in preparing their performance, choreography and official preview video for Eurovision.

The results during all four shows were decided upon through a combination of public televoting (50%) and an in-studio expert jury (50%). The votes of the expert jury and the public televote each created an overall ranking from which points from 1-8, 10 and 12 were distributed and assigned based on the number of competing songs in the respective show. Four members of the jury were appointed by RTVE, while an additional member was selected during the first semi-final through the same process as the entries selection.

The five members of the in-studio jury that evaluated the entries during the shows were:

- José Luis Uribarri – Television presenter and director, commentator of the Eurovision Song Contest for Spain
- Mauro Canut – Musician, editor and deputy director at the digital branch of RTVE
- Mariola Orellana – Music producer
- Toni Garrido – Journalist at RNE
- Víctor Escudero – Program director at Radio Rivas, selected through the public selection

==== Competing entries ====
A submission period was open from 24 November 2008 until 17 December 2008 for artists to upload their entries through the Eurovisión 2009: El retorno MySpace platform. At the conclusion of the submission period, 978 entries were received, of which 455 were selected for an Internet vote. The selected entries were allocated to ten categories by genre and revealed via RTVE's official website on 19 December 2008. The ten categories and the number of songs competing were:

- Pop/Rock - 188
- Ballad - 37
- Metal - 12
- Electronic - 63
- Latin - 29
- Hip Hop - 9
- Indie - 18
- Flamenco - 10
- R&B - 19
- Other - 45

Users had until 19 January 2009 to distribute 20 votes for their five favourite entries per day and the top 20 entries among the top five entries of each category directly qualified for the national final, which were announced on 20 January 2009. The remaining entries were performed in front of the four in-studio jury members appointed by RTVE on 31 January 2009 during a live webcast audition at the Casino l'Aliança del Poblenou Theatre in Barcelona, presented by Vicky Bolaños and Adrián Lucas and broadcast on RTVE's official website, where an additional ten entries were selected for the national final. Prior to the auditions, "Gitana – “Ya layla”" performed by Sin Tanto, "Un día sin fuste" performed by Depresión Post-Parto and "Touch My Heaven" performed by Omi Di were withdrawn and replaced with the songs "La presumida" performed by Antonio Moreno Bermúdez and "Yo solo" performed by José Antonio Santiago Beltrán, respectively.

Results of the live audition – 31 January 2009
R/O	Artist	Song	Result
1	Ron	"Siente"	—N/a
2	Rafa Sáez	"Si tú decides volver"	—N/a
3	Jaime Rojo	"Unión"	—N/a
4	Carlos Ferrer EAI	"El patito"	Advanced
5	Izan	"Prisionero de tu corazón"	—N/a
6	Patrix y Los Raperos	"La fuerza de la unión"	—N/a
7	Dulce	"Bésame"	Advanced
8	Isi	"Ahora no"	Advanced
9	Jammy and Shark	"Presentí tu amor"	—N/a
10	Salva Ortega	"Lujuria"	Advanced
11	Remembrances	"Espejismo"	Advanced
12	Midnight	"Bloody Brutality"	—N/a
13	David Caballero	"Tango-visión"	—N/a
14	Gran Baobab	"Despedida de soltero"	Advanced
15	Mari Callas	"Otra vez"	—N/a
16	La Red de San Luis	"Gracias, Madre Tierra"	Advanced
17	Adrián	"Se puede olvidar"	—N/a
18	Leather Boys	"We're Livin' in a Bar"	Advanced
19	No Life After Love	"Time"	—N/a
20	Bloodsuckers	"The Anthem of Vampires"	—N/a
21	Rafael Sánchez	"Si tú me quieres"	—N/a
22	Fran Arenas	"La echo de menos"	—N/a
23	Vilas Mata	"Dance With Me"	—N/a
24	Ángeles Vela	"Vístete de primavera"	Advanced
25	Oskee	"No quiero despertar"	—N/a
26	Beatriz	"¿Dónde te metes?"	Advanced
27	Iko de la Llilla	"Trono sin reino"	—N/a
28	José Antonio Santiago Beltrán	"Yo solo"	—N/a
29	Antonio Moreno Bermúdez	"La presumida"	—N/a

Qualified entries in the Interet vote and the live audition
Artist	Song	Songwriter(s)	Votes	Place	Selection
Ángeles Vela	"Vístete de primavera"	José María Tornay	33,562	33	Jury
Atalis	"Retrato frontal"	Paco Quintana	49,408	19	Internet vote
Beatriz	"¿Dónde te metes?"	Fernando Calleja	34,470	31	Jury
Biquini	"Una chica normal"	Alfredo Diego	62,662	12	Internet vote
Calipop	"Burbuja"	Sergio Soler; Laura Jimenez; Corey; Bruce; Eddie Cuñao	60,409	15	Internet vote
Carlos Ferrer EAI	"El patito"	Carlos Ferrer EAI	40,095	24	Jury
Diqesi	"Subiré"	Carolina Pereira	59,059	16	Internet vote
Dulce	"Bésame"	Dulce Hernández	36,264	28	Jury
El Secreto de Álex	"Por esta vez"	Alejandro Abad	102,534	6	Internet vote
Elektronikboy	"Mon petit oiseau"	Juan Méndez	57,428	17	Internet vote
Gran Baobab	"Despedida de soltero"	Nacho Pitarch; Axel Kersting; Edu Torrella; Javier Templado; Paco Gamboa; Rafa Than	39,697	25	Jury
Isi	"Ahora no"	Isi Hernández; Cristian Vallo	35,525	30	Jury
Jorge González	"Si yo vengo a enamorarte"	Jaime Roldán; Jesús Domínguez	60,511	14	Internet vote
Julia Bermejo	"Ya no estás"	Julia Bermejo; Miguel Ángel García	82,406	9	Internet vote
La La Love You	"Dame un beso"	David Merino Velasco; Roberto Carlos Castrillo Sánchez	104,663	4	Internet vote
La Red de San Luis	"Gracias, Madre Tierra"	Alejandro de Pinedo; Gema Castaño	32,477	35	Jury
Leather Boys	"We're Livin' in a Bar"	Leather Boys	32,181	36	Jury
Melody y Los Vivancos	"Amante de la luna"	Fernando Bermúdez; Manuel Carrasco	208,481	1	Internet vote
Mirela	"Nada es comparable a ti"	Tony Sánchez-Ohlsson; Thomas G:son; Andreas Rickstrand	51,542	18	Internet vote
Noelia Cano	"Cruza los dedos"	Rafael Artesero	103,361	5	Internet vote
Normativa Vigente	"Alejandría – The New Generation"	Fernando Tamborero; Plácido Langle; Juan César; Héctor Arrollo; David César	88,217	8	Internet vote
Remembrances	"Espejismo"	Haydée Mariñoso; Arturo Hernández; Anthon Lo; Joaquín Pelegrín; Antonio Perea	31,407	37	Jury
Roel	"Y ahora dices"	Roel García	99,534	7	Internet vote
Salva Ortega	"Lujuria"	Alejandro de Pinedo	38,234	27	Jury
Santa Fe	"Samba House"	Ariel Queupumil	130,278	3	Internet vote
Solydo	"Tú"	Danny Oton	46,363	20	Internet vote
Soraya	"La noche es para mí"	Irini Michas; Dimitri Stassos; Jason Gill; Felipe Pedroso	202,198	2	Internet vote
Vicente Casal	"Tú me complementas"	Vicente Casal	79,444	10	Internet vote
Virginia	"True Love"	Rafael Artesero	70,836	11	Internet vote
Yulia Valentayn	"Uh La La"	Yulia Valentayn	61,395	13	Internet vote

==== Fifth jury selection ====
The selection of the fifth in-studio jury member took place over two stages. In the first stage, twenty of the 26 applicants were revealed via RTVE's official website on 19 December 2008 and users had until 19 January 2009 to vote for their favourite candidates. The top five candidates qualified for the second stage which took place during the first semi-final on 14 February 2009, where the fifth jury member, Víctor Escudero, was selected following the combination of votes of the four in-studio jury members appointed by RTVE (50%) and a public televote (50%).

First round – 20 January 2009
Candidate	Votes	Place	Result
Antonio	33	16	—N/a
Cesar Ivan	31	19	—N/a
David Azul	33	17	—N/a
Gabriel Rodríguez Martínez	2,915	9	—N/a
Isaac Urrea Esteban	16,833	1	Advanced
Jaime Ortega	295	11	—N/a
Jesús Domingo Sevilla Navarro	32	18	—N/a
José García Hernández	15,374	2	Advanced
Katherine Muñoz	146	14	—N/a
Leonardo Nascimento	31	20	—N/a
Luis Manuel Ruiz	277	12	—N/a
Miguel Ángel Mur	13,652	3	Advanced
Miguel Manzo	12,159	6	—N/a
Miguel Mestre Ginard	2,503	10	—N/a
Pedro	49	15	—N/a
Pedro Martínez López	12,825	5	Advanced
Rafael Alejandro Anillo Rodriguez	3,648	8	—N/a
Rodrigo Mencía	6,390	7	—N/a
Victor	252	13	—N/a
Víctor M. Escudero	13,047	4	Advanced

Second round – 14 February 2009
R/O	Candidate	Profession	Jury	Televote	Total	Place
1	Isaac Urrea	Representative of AEV Spain	4	2	6	3
2	José García	Representative of eurovision-spain.com	1	4	5	4
3	Miguel Ángel Mur	Program director and presenter at Campus Radio	3	1	4	5
4	Víctor Escudero	Program director at Radio Rivas	5	3	8	1
5	Pedro Martínez	Composer	2	5	7	2

==== Shows ====
===== Semi-finals =====
The three semi-finals took place on 14, 21 and 28 February 2009. The top three entries qualified for the final through the combination of votes of an in-studio jury (50%) and a public televote (50%). In addition to the performances of the competing entries, guest performers in the first semi-final included Tequila and Fangoria, while guest performers in the second semi-final included Rosario Flores and Nena Daconte.

Following the first semi-final, it was announced that Los Vivancos had withdrawn from the national final due to the lack of technical and artistic resources in the production of the show as well as their bid being promoted as Melody even though it was a joint bid. Melody later announced that she would remain in the final and perform with other dancers.

Semi-final 1 – 14 February 2009
R/O	Artist	Song	Jury	Televote	Total	Place	Result
1	Yulia Valentayn	"Uh la la"	6	3	9	8	—N/a
2	La Red de San Luis	"Gracias, Madre Tierra"	8	2	10	5	—N/a
3	Vicente Casal	"Tú me complementas"	1	7	8	9	—N/a
4	Noelia Cano	"Cruza los dedos"	7	4	11	3	Qualified
5	Carlos Ferrer EAI	"El patito"	4	5	9	7	—N/a
6	La La Love You	"Dame un beso"	10	10	20	2	Qualified
7	Normativa Vigente	"Alejandría – The New Generation"	3	6	9	6	—N/a
8	Atalis	"Retrato frontal"	5	1	6	10	—N/a
9^{[c]}	Melody y Los Vivancos	"Amante de la luna"	12	12	24	1	Qualified
10	Gran Baobab	"Despedida de soltero"	2	8	10	4	Qualified

Semi-final 1 – Detailed Jury Votes
R/O	Song	J.L. Uribarri	M. Canut	M. Orellana	T. Garrido	V. Escudero	Total	Points
1	"Uh la la"	4	3	6	6	8	27	6
2	"Gracias, Madre Tierra"	8	8	8	5	6	35	8
3	"Tú me complementas"	2	6	3	2	2	15	1
4	"Cruza los dedos"	10	7	7	4	7	35	7
5	"El patito"	1	2	5	7	1	16	4
6	"Dame un beso"	7	10	10	12	10	49	10
7	"Alejandría – The New Generation"	6	4	1	1	4	16	3
8	"Retrato frontal"	5	5	2	8	3	23	5
9	"Amante de la luna"	12	12	12	10	12	58	12
10	"Despedida de soltero"	3	1	4	3	5	16	2

Semi-final 2 – 21 February 2009
R/O	Artist	Song	Jury	Televote	Total	Place	Result
1	Diqesi	"Subiré"	5	4	9	7	—N/a
2	Roel	"Y ahora dices"	6	3	9	8	—N/a
3	Salva Ortega	"Lujuria"	7	7	14	4	Qualified
4	Soraya	"La noche es para mí"	12	12	24	1	Qualified
5	Virginia	"True Love"	10	10	20	2	Qualified
6	Calipop	"Burbuja"	2	2	4	9	—N/a
7	Ángeles Vela	"Vístete de primavera"	4	5	9	6	—N/a
8	Jorge González	"Si yo vengo a enamorarte"	8	8	16	3	Qualified
9	Electronikboy	"Mon petit oiseau"	1	1	2	10	—N/a
10	Leather Boys	"We're Livin' in a Bar"	3	6	9	5	—N/a

Semi-final 3 – 28 February 2009
R/O	Artist	Song	Jury	Televote	Total	Place	Result
1	El Secreto de Álex	"Por esta vez"	7	6	13	5	—N/a
2	Beatriz	"¿Dónde te metes?"	4	1	5	9	—N/a
3	Remembrances	"Espejismo"	3	4	7	8	—N/a
4	Biquini	"Una chica normal"	2	5	7	7	—N/a
5	Julia Bermejo	"Ya no estás"	6	8	14	4	Qualified
6	Solydo	"Tú"	1	2	3	10	—N/a
7	Mirela	"Nada es comparable a ti"	8	10	18	2	Qualified
8	Isi	"Ahora no"	10	7	17	3	Qualified
9	Santa Fe	"Samba House"	12	12	24	1	Qualified
10	Dulce	"Bésame"	5	3	8	6	—N/a

===== Final =====
The final took place on 28 February 2009 following the third semi-final. The twelve entries that qualified from the preceding three semi-finals competed and the winner, "La noche es para mí" performed by Soraya, was selected through the combination of votes of an in-studio jury (50%) and a public televote (50%). Melody and Soraya were tied at 22 points each but since Soraya received the most votes from the public she was declared the winner. In addition to the performances of the competing entries, guest performers included Carlos Baute, Chipper and Nancys Rubias.

Final – 28 February 2009
R/O	Artist	Song	Jury	Televote	Total	Place
1	La La Love You	"Dame un beso"	4	5	9	7
2	Noelia Cano	"Cruza los dedos"	1	0	1	11
3	Jorge González	"Si yo vengo a enamorarte"	3	1	4	9
4	Virginia	"True Love"	5	6	11	5
5	Salva Ortega	"Lujuria"	0	3	3	10
6	Gran Baobab	"Despedida de soltero"	0	0	0	12
7	Santa Fe	"Samba House"	8	8	16	3
8	Melody	"Amante de la luna"	12	10	22	2
9	Isi	"Ahora no"	7	4	11	6
10	Soraya	"La noche es para mí"	10	12	22	1
11	Mirela	"Nada es comparable a ti"	6	7	13	4
12	Julia Bermejo	"Ya no estás"	2	2	4	8

===== Ratings =====
Viewing figures by show
Show	Air date	Viewing figures		Ref.
Show	Air date	Nominal	Share	Ref.
Semi-final 1	14 February 2009	747,000	6.5%	
Semi-final 2	21 February 2009	912,000	6.3%	
Semi-final 3/Final	28 February 2009	799,000	6.5%	

=== Promotion ===
Soraya made several appearances across Europe to specifically promote "La noche es para mí" as the Spanish Eurovision entry. On 18 and 19 April, Soraya took part in promotional activities in Belgium and performed during an event held at the Place Sainte-Catherine/Sint-Katelijneplein in Brussels. On 18 April, she performed during Eurovision Promo Concert event which was held at the Amsterdam Marcanti venue in Netherlands and hosted by Marga Bult and Maggie MacNeal. On 27 and 28 April, she took part in promotional activities in Portugal where she performed "La noche es para mí" on the RTP1 talk show Portugal no coração and appeared during the programmes Música do Mondo and Só visto!. On 29 April, Soraya performed during a special concert, which was held at the Golden Hits venue in Stockholm. In addition to her international appearances, she performed during a Spanish Eurovision party, which took place at the La Boite club in Madrid on 3 April.

== At Eurovision ==
According to Eurovision rules, all nations with the exceptions of the host country and the "Big Four" (France, Germany, Spain and the United Kingdom) are required to qualify from one of two semi-finals in order to compete for the final; the top ten countries from each semi-final progress to the final. As a member of the "Big 4", Spain automatically qualified to compete in the final on 16 May 2009. In addition to their participation in the final, Spain is also required to broadcast and vote in one of the two semi-finals. The EBU's Reference Group approved a request by the Spanish broadcaster for Spain to broadcast the second semi-final on 14 May 2009 due to its commitments to broadcast the Madrid Open tennis tournament.

In Spain, the second semi-final was broadcast on a tape delay on La 2 and the final was broadcast on La 1 with commentary by Joaquín Guzmán. RTVE appointed Iñaki del Moral as its spokesperson to announce during the final the Spanish votes. The broadcast of the final was watched by 5.12 million viewers in Spain with a market share of 35.9%. This represented a decrease of 23.4% from the previous year with 4.214 million less viewers.

=== Final ===
Soraya took part in technical rehearsals on 9 and 10 May, followed by dress rehearsals on 15 and 16 May. This included the jury final on 15 May where the professional juries of each country watched and voted on the competing entries. During the running order draw for the semi-final and final on 16 March 2009, Spain chose to perform last in position 25 in the final as one of the seven wildcard countries, following the entry from Finland.

The Spanish performance featured Soraya on stage wearing a purple jumpsuit with crystal inlays, joined by three backing vocalists wearing purple dresses and two dancers wearing black suits. The performance began with the performers on a small staircase which they made use of throughout the performance. The LED screens displayed nightclub-styled imagery including disco balls, projections of the lyrics from the song "Take me!" and "Shake me!", and a close-up of Soraya's face. The performance also featured pyrotechnic flame effects as well as the use of glitter fountains and red bolts. The choreographer for the performance was Mayte Marcos. The three backing vocalists that joined Soraya were Noemí Gallego, Verónica Ferreiro and Nora Gallego, while the two dancers were Dima Oleschenko and Alexey Postolovski. Spain placed twenty-fourth in the final, scoring 23 points.

=== Voting ===
Voting during the three shows consisted of 50 percent public televoting and 50 percent from a jury deliberation. The jury consisted of five music industry professionals who were citizens of the country they represent. This jury was asked to judge each contestant based on: vocal capacity; the stage performance; the song's composition and originality; and the overall impression by the act. In addition, no member of a national jury could be related in any way to any of the competing acts in such a way that they cannot vote impartially and independently. In the second semi-final, Spain's vote was based on 100 percent jury voting due to the delayed broadcast.

Following the release of the full split voting by the EBU after the conclusion of the competition, it was revealed that Spain had placed twenty-first with the public televote and twenty-fifth (last) with the jury vote. In the public vote, Spain scored 38 points and in the jury vote the nation scored 9 points.

Below is a breakdown of points awarded to Spain and awarded by Spain in the first semi-final and grand final of the contest. The nation awarded its 12 points to Norway in the semi-final and the final of the contest.

==== Points awarded to Spain ====
Points awarded to Spain (Final)
Score	Country
12 points	Andorra
10 points	
8 points	
7 points	Portugal
6 points	
5 points	
4 points	
3 points	Switzerland
2 points	
1 point	Greece

==== Points awarded by Spain ====
Points awarded by Spain (Semi-final 2)
Score	Country
12 points	Norway
10 points	Ukraine
8 points	Moldova
7 points	Azerbaijan
6 points	Greece
5 points	Serbia
4 points	Denmark
3 points	Hungary
2 points	Estonia
1 point	Lithuania

Points awarded by Spain (Final)
Score	Country
12 points	Norway
10 points	United Kingdom
8 points	Portugal
7 points	Romania
6 points	Ukraine
5 points	Moldova
4 points	Armenia
3 points	France
2 points	Turkey
1 point	Greece

==== Detailed voting results ====
The following members comprised the Spanish jury:

- José Luis Uribarri – commentator
- Toni Garrido – journalist at RNE
- Mauro Canut – musician, editor and deputy director at the digital branch of RTVE
- Mariola Orellana – music producer
- Pedro Martínez – composer

Detailed voting results from Spain (Final)
R/O	Country	Results			Points
R/O	Country	Jury	Televoting	Combined	Points
01	Lithuania				
02	Israel	2		2	
03	France	8		8	3
04	Sweden		1	1	
05	Croatia				
06	Portugal	7	7	14	8
07	Iceland				
08	Greece		3	3	1
09	Armenia		8	8	4
10	Russia				
11	Azerbaijan	3		3	
12	Bosnia and Herzegovina				
13	Moldova	5	4	9	5
14	Malta				
15	Estonia				
16	Denmark				
17	Germany	1	2	3	
18	Turkey	6		6	2
19	Albania				
20	Norway	10	10	20	12
21	Ukraine	4	6	10	6
22	Romania		12	12	7
23	United Kingdom	12	5	17	10
24	Finland				
25	Spain				

== Notes and references ==
=== Notes ===
- a. Santa Fe's song competed as "You got me hot" in the online vote, but was retitled "Samba House" for the semi-finals.
- b. Each member of the jury gave points in the traditional Eurovision style of 12, 10, 8-1 point(s), and when these points were added, both La Red de San Luis and Noelia Cano had 35 points. Later, when these points where translated depending on the ranking in order to be added to the televotes, the tie between La Red de San Luis and Noelia Cano was broken, but it was not announced how.
- c. Due to technical difficulties in the performance, Melody y Los Vivancos was allowed to restart their performance.
