= Denmark in the Eurovision Song Contest 2009 =

- Eurovision Song Contest 2009
- Participating broadcaster: Danmarks Radio (DR)
- Country: Denmark
- Selection process: Dansk Melodi Grand Prix 2009
- Selection date: 31 January 2009

Competing entry
- Song: "Believe Again"
- Artist: Brinck
- Songwriters: Lars Halvor Jensen; Martin Michael Larsson; Ronan Keating

Placement
- Semi-final result: Qualified (8th, 69 points)
- Final result: 13th, 74 points

Participation chronology

Denmark was represented at the Eurovision Song Contest 2009 with the song "Believe Again", written by Lars Halvor Jensen, Martin Michael Larsson, and Ronan Keating, and performed by Brinck. The Danish participating broadcaster, Danmarks Radio (DR), organised the national final Dansk Melodi Grand Prix 2009 in order to select its entry for the contest. Ten songs competed in a televised show where the winner was selected over three rounds of voting. The results of the first round were decided upon through the combination of jury voting and public voting while the results in the second and third round were determined solely by public televoting. "Believe Again" performed by Brinck was the winner after gaining the most public votes in the third round.

Denmark was drawn to compete in the second semi-final of the Eurovision Song Contest which took place on 14 May 2009. Performing during the show in position 9, "Believe Again" was announced among the 10 qualifying entries of the second semi-final and therefore qualified to compete in the final on 16 May. It was later revealed that Denmark placed eighth out of the 19 participating countries in the semi-final with 69 points. In the final, Denmark performed in position 16 and placed thirteenth out of the 25 participating countries, scoring 74 points.

== Background ==
Prior to the 2009 contest, Danmarks Radio (DR) had participated in the Eurovision Song Contest representing Denmark thirty-seven times since its first entry in 1957. It had won the contest, to this point, on two occasions: in 1963 with the song "Dansevise" performed by Grethe and Jørgen Ingmann, and in 2000 with the song "Fly on the Wings of Love" performed by Olsen Brothers. In 2008, "All Night Long" performed by Simon Mathew qualified to the final placing fifteenth.

As part of its duties as participating broadcaster, DR organises the selection of its entry in the Eurovision Song Contest and broadcasts the event in the country. The broadcaster confirmed its intentions to participate at the 2009 contest on 25 August 2008. DR has selected all of its Eurovision entries through the national final Dansk Melodi Grand Prix. Along with its participation confirmation, the broadcaster announced that Dansk Melodi Grand Prix 2009 would be organised in order to select its entry for the 2009 contest.

== Before Eurovision ==
=== Dansk Melodi Grand Prix 2009 ===
Dansk Melodi Grand Prix 2009 was the 39th edition of Dansk Melodi Grand Prix, the music competition that selects Denmark's entries for the Eurovision Song Contest. The event was held on 31 January 2009 at the MCH Messecenter Herning in Herning, hosted by Birthe Kjær and Felix Smith and televised on DR1 as well as streamed online at the official DR website. The national final was watched by 1.717 million viewers in Denmark.

==== Format ====
Ten songs competed in one show where the winner was determined over three rounds of voting. In the first round, the top four songs based on the combination of votes from a public televote and a seven-member jury panel qualified to the second round. One of the jurors was a listener of DR P4 who won the radio competition Danmarksmester. In the second round, the four songs competed in two duels and the winner of each duel as determined exclusively by the public vote qualified to the final round, where the winner was determined again exclusively by the public vote. Viewers were able to vote via SMS.

The seven-member jury panel was composed of:

- Søs Fenger – singer-songwriter
- Bent Fabricius-Bjerre – composer
- Anna David – singer
- Martin Brygmann – actor and composer
- Kjeld Tolstrup – DJ and radio host
- Michael Hardinger – musician and songwriter
- Kalle Meyer Vestergaard – member of OGAE Denmark, winner of Danmarksmester

==== Competing entries ====
DR opened a submission period between 25 August 2008 and 8 October 2008 for artists and composers to submit their entries. The broadcaster received a record breaking 684 entries during the submission period; the previous record was set in 2002 when the broadcaster received 662 entries. A selection committee selected six songs from the entries submitted to the broadcaster with their artists being chosen by DR in consultation with the composers, while four of the participants were invited to compete based on editorial considerations. DR held a press meet and greet at the DR Byen in Copenhagen on 9 January 2009 where the competing artists and songs were announced and officially presented. Among the artists was Trine Jepsen who represented Denmark in the Eurovision Song Contest 1999.

The entries were to be released on 30 January 2009, however, a premature leak was made due to an early release of the official album by record company My Way Music. 17 legal downloads were made before the album was taken off and one of them was uploaded online via YouTube and published as an illegal sharing file on the internet. My Way Music subsequently took legal action against the person who illegally published the sharing file.

| Artist | Song | Songwriter(s) | Selection |
|---|---|---|---|
| Brinck | "Believe Again" | Lars Halvor Jensen, Martin Michael Larsson, Ronan Keating | Open submission |
| Christina Undhjem | "Underneath My Skin" | Mads Haugaard, Brian Risberg Clausen | Open submission |
| Claus Christensen | "Big Bang Baby" | Troels Holdt, Lars Malm, Lise Cabble | Open submission |
| Hera Björk | "Someday" | Christina Schilling, Jonas Gladnikoff, Henrik Szabo, Daniel Nilsson | Open submission |
| Jeppe | "Lucky Boy" | Jeppe Breum Laurssen | Invited by DR |
| Jimmy Jørgensen | "Alice in the Wonderland" | Mikael Erlandsson, Torbjørn Wassenius, Claes Andreasson, Birgitte Rye | Invited by DR |
| Johnny Deluxe | "Sindssyg" | Noam Halby, Jakob Glæsner, Peter Kvint | Invited by DR |
| Marie Carmen Koppel | "Crying Out Your Name" | Marie Carmen Koppel, Dan Hemmer | Invited by DR |
| Sukkerchok | "Det' det" | Lasse Lindorff, Mogens Binderup, Lise Cabble | Open submission |
| Trine Jepsen | "I'll Never Fall in Love Again" | Claes Andreasson, Torbjörn Wassenius, Johan Sahlén, Niels Kvistborg | Open submission |

==== Final ====
The final took place on 31 January 2009. In the first round of voting the top four advanced to the superfinal based on the votes of a seven-member jury (50%) and a public televote (50%). In the second round, four songs faced off each other in two duels and a public televote selected the winners of each duel that advanced to the final round. In the final round, the winner, "Believe Again" performed by Brinck, was selected solely by a public vote.

Final – 31 January 2009
| R/O | Artist | Song | Result |
|---|---|---|---|
| 1 | Trine Jepsen | "I'll Never Fall in Love Again" | —N/a |
| 2 | Jeppe | "Lucky Boy" | —N/a |
| 3 | Marie Carmen Koppel | "Crying Out Your Name" | —N/a |
| 4 | Sukkerchok | "Det' det" | Advanced |
| 5 | Jimmy Jørgensen | "Alice in the Wonderland" | —N/a |
| 6 | Hera Björk | "Someday" | Advanced |
| 7 | Claus Christensen | "Big Bang Baby" | —N/a |
| 8 | Johnny Deluxe | "Sindssyg" | Advanced |
| 9 | Christina Undhjem | "Underneath My Skin" | —N/a |
| 10 | Brinck | "Believe Again" | Advanced |

Second Round – 31 January 2009
| Duel | R/O | Artist | Song | Result |
|---|---|---|---|---|
| I | 1 | Sukkerchok | "Det' det" | —N/a |
| I | 2 | Hera Björk | "Someday" | Advanced |
| II | 3 | Brinck | "Believe Again" | Advanced |
| II | 4 | Johnny Deluxe | "Sindssyg" | —N/a |

Final Round – 31 January 2009
| R/O | Artist | Song | Place |
|---|---|---|---|
| 1 | Hera Björk | "Someday" | 2 |
| 2 | Brinck | "Believe Again" | 1 |

=== Promotion ===
Brinck specifically promoted "Believe Again" as the Danish Eurovision entry on 18 April 2009 by taking part in promotional activities in the Netherlands where he performed during the Eurovision in Concert event which was held at the Amsterdam Marcanti venue in Amsterdam, Netherlands and hosted by Marga Bult and Maggie MacNeal, and appeared during the RTL 4 programme Life and Cooking.

== At Eurovision ==
According to Eurovision rules, all nations with the exceptions of the host country and the "Big Four" (France, Germany, Spain and the United Kingdom) are required to qualify from one of two semi-finals in order to compete for the final; the top nine songs from each semi-final as determined by televoting progress to the final, and a tenth was determined by back-up juries. The European Broadcasting Union (EBU) split up the competing countries into six different pots based on voting patterns from previous contests, with countries with favourable voting histories put into the same pot. On 30 January 2009, a special allocation draw was held which placed each country into one of the two semi-finals. Denmark was placed into the second semi-final, to be held on 14 May 2009. The running order for the semi-finals was decided through another draw on 16 March 2009 and Denmark was set to perform in position 9, following the entry from Slovakia and before the entry from Slovenia.

The two semi-finals and final were broadcast on DR1 with commentary by Nikolaj Molbech. DR appointed Felix Smith as its spokesperson to announce the Danish votes during the final.

=== Semi-final ===
Brinck took part in technical rehearsals on 6 and 9 May, followed by dress rehearsals on 13 and 14 May. The Danish performance featured Brinck dressed in a white shirt and trousers with a black waistcoat and performing with three guitarists, a drummer and a keyboard player. The LED screens transitioned from floodlights and green shrubbery to the words "Believe Again" in white lights at the end and the performance was finished with a pyrotechnic effect. The musicians that joined Brinck were: Anders Øhrstrøm, Claus Petersen, Oliver McEwan, Søren Andersen and Tim McEwan.

At the end of the show, Denmark was announced as having finished in the top ten and subsequently qualifying for the grand final. It was later revealed that Denmark placed eighth in the semi-final, receiving a total of 69 points.

=== Final ===
Shortly after the second semi-final, a winners' press conference was held for the ten qualifying countries. As part of this press conference, the qualifying artists took part in a draw to determine the running order for the final. This draw was done in the order the countries appeared in the semi-final running order. Denmark was drawn to perform in position 15, following the entry from Estonia and before the entry from Germany.

Brinck once again took part in dress rehearsals on 15 and 16 May before the final, including the jury final where the professional juries cast their final votes before the live show. Brinck performed a repeat of his semi-final performance during the final on 16 May. At the conclusion of the voting, Denmark finished in thirteenth place with 74 points.

=== Voting ===
The voting system for 2009 involved each country awarding points from 1–8, 10 and 12, with the points in the final being decided by a combination of 50% national jury and 50% televoting. Each nation's jury consisted of five music industry professionals who are citizens of the country they represent. This jury judged each entry based on: vocal capacity; the stage performance; the song's composition and originality; and the overall impression by the act. In addition, no member of a national jury was permitted to be related in any way to any of the competing acts in such a way that they cannot vote impartially and independently.

Following the release of the full split voting by the EBU after the conclusion of the competition, it was revealed that Denmark had placed nineteenth with the public televote and sixth with the jury vote in the final. In the public vote, Denmark scored 40 points, while with the jury vote, Denmark scored 120 points.

Below is a breakdown of points awarded to Denmark and awarded by Denmark in the second semi-final and grand final of the contest. The nation awarded its 12 points to Norway in the semi-final and the final of the contest.

==== Points awarded to Denmark ====
Points awarded to Denmark (Semi-final 2)
| Score | Country |
|---|---|
| 12 points | Norway |
| 10 points | |
| 8 points | Estonia |
| 7 points | Ireland; Netherlands |
| 6 points | |
| 5 points | Albania; Lithuania; Slovenia |
| 4 points | Spain |
| 3 points | Cyprus; Hungary; Latvia |
| 2 points | Azerbaijan; Croatia; Greece |
| 1 point | Poland |

Points awarded to Denmark (Final)
| Score | Country |
|---|---|
| 12 points | |
| 10 points | |
| 8 points | Norway; Slovenia |
| 7 points | Poland |
| 6 points | Cyprus; Malta |
| 5 points | Andorra; France; Moldova; Ukraine |
| 4 points | Iceland; Ireland |
| 3 points | Hungary; Latvia |
| 2 points | Lithuania; Romania |
| 1 point | Serbia |

==== Points awarded by Denmark ====
Points awarded by Denmark (Semi-final 2)
| Score | Country |
|---|---|
| 12 points | Norway |
| 10 points | Ireland |
| 8 points | Azerbaijan |
| 7 points | Cyprus |
| 6 points | Albania |
| 5 points | Lithuania |
| 4 points | Estonia |
| 3 points | Poland |
| 2 points | Greece |
| 1 point | Netherlands |

Points awarded by Denmark (Final)
| Score | Country |
|---|---|
| 12 points | Norway |
| 10 points | Iceland |
| 8 points | Azerbaijan |
| 7 points | Germany |
| 6 points | Turkey |
| 5 points | Estonia |
| 4 points | Sweden |
| 3 points | United Kingdom |
| 2 points | France |
| 1 point | Lithuania |

==== Detailed voting results ====
Detailed voting results from Denmark (Final)
| R/O | Country | Results | | | Points |
| R/O | Country | Jury | Televoting | Combined | Points |
|---|---|---|---|---|---|
| 01 | Lithuania | 5 | | 5 | 1 |
| 02 | Israel | | | | |
| 03 | France | 6 | | 6 | 2 |
| 04 | Sweden | | 7 | 7 | 4 |
| 05 | Croatia | | | | |
| 06 | Portugal | 2 | | 2 | |
| 07 | Iceland | 12 | 10 | 22 | 10 |
| 08 | Greece | | | | |
| 09 | Armenia | | | | |
| 10 | Russia | 3 | | 3 | |
| 11 | Azerbaijan | 4 | 5 | 9 | 8 |
| 12 | Bosnia and Herzegovina | | 1 | 1 | |
| 13 | Moldova | | | | |
| 14 | Malta | | 3 | 3 | |
| 15 | Estonia | 8 | | 8 | 5 |
| 16 | Denmark | | | | |
| 17 | Germany | 7 | 2 | 9 | 7 |
| 18 | Turkey | | 8 | 8 | 6 |
| 19 | Albania | | | | |
| 20 | Norway | 10 | 12 | 22 | 12 |
| 21 | Ukraine | | | | |
| 22 | Romania | | | | |
| 23 | United Kingdom | 1 | 6 | 7 | 3 |
| 24 | Finland | | 4 | 4 | |
| 25 | Spain | | | | |
