= Azerbaijan in the Eurovision Song Contest 2009 =

- Eurovision Song Contest 2009
- Participating broadcaster: İctimai Televiziya (İTV)
- Country: Azerbaijan
- Selection process: Internal selection
- Announcement date: Artist: 17 January 2009; Song: 3 March 2009

Competing entry
- Song: "Always"
- Artist: AySel and Arash
- Songwriters: Arash Labaf; Robert Uhlmann; Johan Bejerholm; Marcus Englöf; Alex Papaconstantinou; Elin Wrethov; Anderz Wrethov

Placement
- Semi-final result: Qualified (2nd, 180 points)
- Final result: 3rd, 207 points

Participation chronology

Azerbaijan was represented at the Eurovision Song Contest 2009 with the song "Always", written by Arash Labaf, Robert Uhlmann, Marcus Englöf, Johan Bejerholm, Alex Papaconstantinou, Anderz Wrethov, and Elin Wrethov, and performed by AySel and Arash. The Azerbaijani participating broadcaster, İctimai Televiziya (İTV), internally selected the entry and the performers. AySel and Arash's selection was announced separately on 17 January and 12 February 2009, respectively, while the song "Always" was presented to the public on 3 March 2009.

Azerbaijan was drawn to compete in the second semi-final of the Eurovision Song Contest which took place on 14 May 2009. Performing during the show in position 12, "Always" was announced among the 10 qualifying entries of the second semi-final and therefore qualified to compete in the final on 16 May. It was later revealed that Azerbaijan placed second out of the 19 participating countries in the semi-final with 180 points. In the final, Azerbaijan performed in position 11 and placed third out of the 25 participating countries, scoring 207 points.

== Background ==
Prior to the 2009 contest, İctimai Televiziya (İTV) had participated in the Eurovision Song Contest representing Azerbaijan once, in 2008 when the song "Day After Day" performed by Elnur and Samir placed eighth.

As part of its duties as participating broadcaster, İTV organises the selection of its entry in the Eurovision Song Contest and broadcasts the event in the country. The broadcaster confirmed its intentions to participate at the 2009 contest on 2 November 2008. In 2008, İTV organized a national final titled Land of Fire, which resulted in the selection of a winning performer that would subsequently be given an internally selected song to perform at Eurovision. In 2009, the broadcaster had initially planned to organise the Land of Fire national final, however, plans to stage the show were later abandoned in favour of internally selecting both the artist and song due to a lack of quality of the participants.

== Before Eurovision ==
=== Internal selection ===
Both the artist and song that represented Azerbaijan at the Eurovision Song Contest 2009 was selected internally by İTV. On 16 January 2009, the broadcaster called for interested songwriters to submit their entries by 22 January 2009. Songwriters could be of any nationality. On 17 January 2009, İTV announced that Aysel Teymurzadeh would represent Azerbaijan. The selection of AySel as the Azerbaijani Eurovision contestant was based on the decision of İTV and a national jury panel from 40 potential artists that attended a casting round on 24 and 25 October 2008. The members of the jury were Ismail Omarov (General Director of İTV), Ibrahim Guliyev (Executive Director of the Azerbaijani Culture Friends Foundation), Farhad Badalbeyli (Rector of the Baku Academy of Music), Lala Kazimova (President of the National Music Committee of Azerbaijan), Murad Adigozelzade (Director of the Azerbaijan State Academic Philharmonic Hall), Manzar Nuraliyeva (representative of the Ministry of Culture and Tourism of Azerbaijan) and Farhad Hajiyev (representative of the Ministry of Youth and Sports of Azerbaijan).

Artists participating in the first phase of the selection
- Arzum
- Aysel Teymurzadeh
- Azad Shukurov
- Elnara
- Emin Hasan
- Gunesh Abasova
- Natavan Habibi
- Nura Suri
- Sevda Yahyaeva
- Vusala Seydova

On 5 February 2009, İTV announced that AySel would be performing the song "Always". The song was selected from 30 submissions from local and international songwriters in a similar broadcaster and jury method. "Always" was written by Arash Labaf, Robert Uhlmann, Marcus Englöf, Johan Bejerholm, Alex Papaconstantinou, Anderz Wrethov and Elin Wrethov. On 12 February 2009, Arash revealed that he would also be performing at the contest in a duet with AySel. "Always" was presented by Warner Music Sweden on 3 March 2009, while the official music video was later released on 19 March 2009. In regards to the song, AySel stated: "I'm 19 and I can tell you that I was in love. But now I'm waiting for such a strong and engrossing feeling in my life, like that one we are singing about with Arash in our song. I cant wait to find that special someone that only one whom will spell my name and all the mountains are high!"

=== Promotion ===
AySel and Arash made several appearances across Europe to specifically promote "Always" as the Azerbaijani Eurovision entry. On 7 March, AySel and Arash performed "Always" during the Russian Eurovision national final. On 8 March, AySel and Arash performed the song during the final of the Slovak Eurovision national final Eurosong 2009. Between 18 and 19 April, AySel and Arash took part in additional promotional activities in Russia where they performed during the Muz-TV programme VIP zone. On 23 April, AySel and Arash appeared during the TVP1 morning show programme Kawa czy Herbata in Poland. On 26 April, AySel and Arash performed during the TV SLO1 programme Spet doma in Slovenia. Between 28 and 29 April, AySel and Arash took part in promotional activities in Romania. On 29 April, AySel and Arash performed during the Eurovision Preview Night event, which was held at the Trädgården venue in Stockholm, Sweden.

== At Eurovision ==
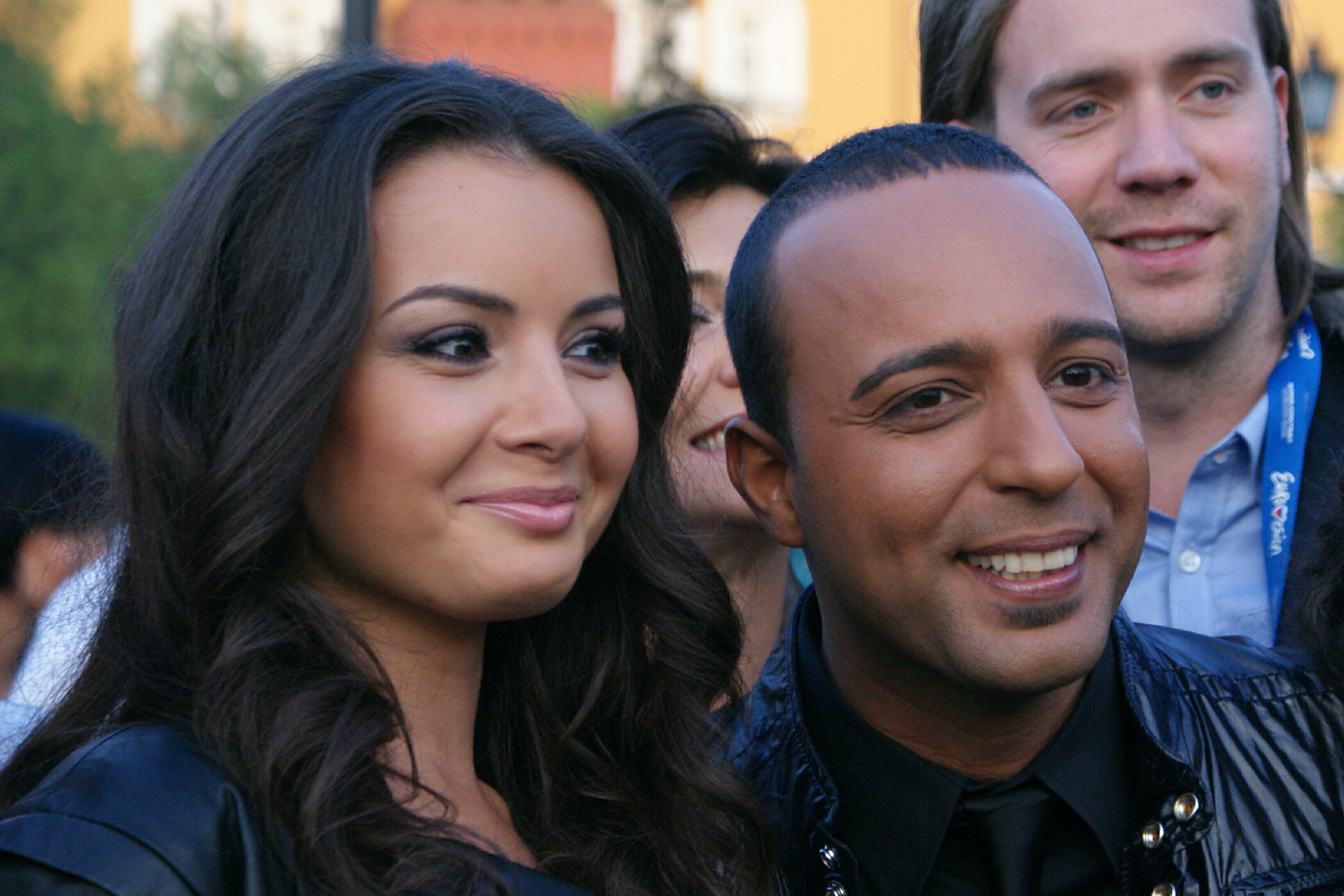
AySel and Arash at the Eurovision Opening Party in Moscow

According to Eurovision rules, all nations with the exceptions of the host country and the "Big Four" (France, Germany, Spain and the United Kingdom) are required to qualify from one of two semi-finals in order to compete for the final; the top nine songs from each semi-final as determined by televoting progress to the final, and a tenth was determined by back-up juries. The European Broadcasting Union (EBU) split up the competing countries into six different pots based on voting patterns from previous contests, with countries with favourable voting histories put into the same pot. On 30 January 2009, a special allocation draw was held which placed each country into one of the two semi-finals. Azerbaijan was placed into the second semi-final, to be held on 14 May 2009. The running order for the semi-finals was decided through another draw on 16 March 2009 and Azerbaijan was set to perform in position 12, following the entry from Hungary and before the entry from Greece.

The two semi-finals and final were broadcast in Azerbaijan on İTV with commentary by Leyla Aliyeva, who was joined by AySel for the first semi-final and Isa Melikov for the final. The Azerbaijani spokesperson, who announced the Azerbaijani votes during the final, was Husniyya Maharramova.

=== Semi-final ===
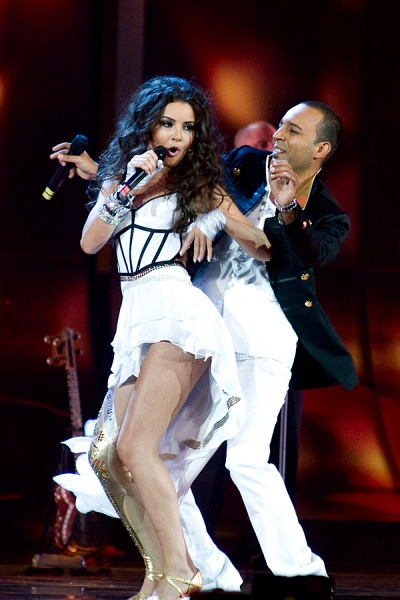
AySel and Arash performing during the second semi-final

AySel and Arash took part in technical rehearsals on 6 and 9 May, followed by dress rehearsals on 13 and 14 May. Their second technical rehearsal was also attended by the Russian Prime Minister Vladimir Putin.

The Azerbaijani performance featured AySel and Arash dressed in outfits designed by Lars Wallin performing a choreographed routine with three dancers; AySel was in a white, gold and silver dress with white and black Swarovski crystals. The performance began with AySel and Arash on top of a metal pedestal with adjacent stairs, after which they went down to the stage floor via the stairs to join the dancers. During the instrumental part of the song, Arash played the tar. The LED screens displayed red and yellow colours as well as erupting volcanoes and drums and the performance also incorporated pyrotechnics, which included flames and fireworks. The performance was directed by Roine Söderlundh.

At the end of the show, Azerbaijan was announced as having finished in the top ten and subsequently qualifying for the grand final. It was later revealed that Azerbaijan placed second in the semi-final, receiving a total of 180 points.

=== Final ===
Shortly after the second semi-final, a winners' press conference was held for the ten qualifying countries. As part of this press conference, the qualifying artists took part in a draw to determine the running order for the final. This draw was done in the order the countries appeared in the semi-final running order. Azerbaijan was drawn to perform in position 11, following the entry from Russia and before the entry from Bosnia and Herzegovina.

AySel and Arash once again took part in dress rehearsals on 15 and 16 May before the final, including the jury final where the professional juries cast their final votes before the live show. The duo performed a repeat of their semi-final performance during the final on 16 May. At the conclusion of the voting, Azerbaijan finished in third place with 207 points. After the contest, Azerbaijan became the winner of the fourth Annual ESC Radio Awards in the category of the Best Group.

=== Voting ===
The voting system for 2009 involved each country awarding points from 1-8, 10 and 12, with the points in the final being decided by a combination of 50% national jury and 50% televoting. Each nation's jury consisted of five music industry professionals who are citizens of the country they represent. This jury judged each entry based on: vocal capacity; the stage performance; the song's composition and originality; and the overall impression by the act. In addition, no member of a national jury was permitted to be related in any way to any of the competing acts in such a way that they cannot vote impartially and independently.

Following the release of the full split voting by the EBU after the conclusion of the competition, it was revealed that Azerbaijan had placed second with the public televote and eighth with the jury vote in the final. In the public vote, Azerbaijan scored 253 points, while with the jury vote, Azerbaijan scored 112 points.

Below is a breakdown of points awarded to Azerbaijan and awarded by Azerbaijan in the second semi-final and grand final of the contest. The nation awarded its 12 points to Norway in the semi-final and to Turkey in the final of the contest.

==== Points awarded to Azerbaijan ====
Points awarded to Azerbaijan (Semi-final 2)
Score	Country
12 points	Hungary; Moldova; Poland; Russia; Slovakia; Ukraine
10 points	Cyprus; Estonia; France; Lithuania
8 points	Denmark; Latvia; Netherlands
7 points	Greece; Spain
6 points	Croatia; Ireland; Norway; Serbia; Slovenia
5 points	
4 points	
3 points	
2 points	
1 point	

Points awarded to Azerbaijan (Final)
Score	Country
12 points	Turkey
10 points	Belarus; Croatia; Czech Republic; Hungary; Moldova; Netherlands; Norway; Ukraine
8 points	Bulgaria; Cyprus; Denmark; Greece; Sweden
7 points	Estonia; Russia
6 points	Israel; Montenegro; Poland
5 points	Lithuania
4 points	Albania; Latvia; Romania; Serbia; Slovakia
3 points	Belgium; Bosnia and Herzegovina; Macedonia; United Kingdom
2 points	Finland
1 point	Armenia; France; Malta; Slovenia

==== Points awarded by Azerbaijan ====
Points awarded by Azerbaijan (Semi-final 2)
Score	Country
12 points	Norway
10 points	Ukraine
8 points	Hungary
7 points	Moldova
6 points	Lithuania
5 points	Albania
4 points	Greece
3 points	Estonia
2 points	Denmark
1 point	Poland

Points awarded by Azerbaijan (Final)
Score	Country
12 points	Turkey
10 points	Ukraine
8 points	Norway
7 points	Moldova
6 points	Russia
5 points	Croatia
4 points	Estonia
3 points	Romania
2 points	Bosnia and Herzegovina
1 point	Lithuania

==== Detailed voting results ====
Detailed voting results from Azerbaijan (Final)
R/O	Country	Results			Points
R/O	Country	Jury	Televoting	Combined	Points
01	Lithuania		4	4	1
02	Israel				
03	France				
04	Sweden				
05	Croatia	8		8	5
06	Portugal				
07	Iceland				
08	Greece		2	2	
09	Armenia				
10	Russia	3	7	10	6
11	Azerbaijan				
12	Bosnia and Herzegovina	5		5	2
13	Moldova	7	5	12	7
14	Malta	1		1	
15	Estonia		6	6	4
16	Denmark				
17	Germany				
18	Turkey	12	12	24	12
19	Albania		3	3	
20	Norway	4	10	14	8
21	Ukraine	10	8	18	10
22	Romania	6		6	3
23	United Kingdom	2	1	3	
24	Finland				
25	Spain				

== Controversies ==
=== Votestacking allegations ===
After the finish of Eurovision 2009, some Belarusian media reported that unknown people allegedly paid Belarusian students to vote for Azerbaijan, and supposedly even transported them to the Belarusian-Lithuanian border in 10 buses. The cost of whole action is claimed to be about 55 million roubles. They voted for Azerbaijan with the help of Belarusian SIM cards and then received Lithuanian cards to do the same. "Always" received high votes from Belarus (10) and Lithuania (5), being even ahead of Russia in Belarus. The head of the Azerbaijani diaspora in Belarus, which numbers tens of thousands of people, Natik Baghirov said that he did not know anything about the action, and that the song received support from the entire Europe, not just Belarus and Lithuania, while Sergey Malinovsky, Belorussian jury member of the Eurovision, openly doubted that such vote irregularity could take place, and believed that the Azerbaijani song received public support because of its catchy melody and good performance. However, European Radio for Belarus had an unofficial confirmation from the Minsk auto parks that they do it every year for various countries.

=== Video clip controversies ===
Following the protests of Azerbaijani officials, Eurovision's Russian hosts removed from the video of the Armenian performers the image of the monument We Are Our Mountains, which is located in Nagorno-Karabakh region of Azerbaijan. In response, the edited image was used as a background by Armenian Public Television during the announcement of the voting results in Armenia.

Azerbaijan's reel depicted Maqbaratoshoara and Segonbad monuments, the symbols of the cities of Tabriz and Urumieh in the Azerbaijan region of Iran. The Armenian media have complained that while Eurovision forbade demonstration of the Armenian monument located in Nagorno-Karabakh region after the protest of Azerbaijani government, it allowed the inclusion of the Iranian monuments.

=== State surveillance and questioning of voters ===
In August 2009, a number of Azerbaijanis who had voted for Armenia's entry during the contest were called in for questioning at the Ministry of National Security in Baku, during which they were accused of being "unpatriotic" and "a potential security threat". One of those questioned later said that he was told by his interrogators that they had the names and addresses of 43 Azerbaijanis who had voted for Armenia.
