= Russia in the Eurovision Song Contest 2009 =

- Eurovision Song Contest 2009
- Country: Russia
- Selection process: Evrovidenie 2009 - Nacionalny Otbor
- Selection date: 7 March 2009

Competing entry
- Song: "Mamo"
- Artist: Anastasia Prikhodko
- Songwriters: Konstantin Meladze; Diana Golde

Placement
- Final result: 11th, 91 points

Participation chronology

Russia participated in and hosted the Eurovision Song Contest 2009 in Moscow after winning the Eurovision Song Contest 2008 with the song "Believe" performed by Dima Bilan. The Russian entry was selected through a national final, organised by the Russian broadcaster Channel One Russia (C1R). Anastasia Prikhodko represented Russia with the song "Mamo", which scored 91 points in the final and finished in 11th place.

== Before Eurovision ==
=== Evrovidenie 2009 - Nacionalny Otbor ===
Evrovidenie 2009 - Nacionalny Otbor was the fifth edition of Evrovidenie, the music competition that selects Russia's entry for the Eurovision Song Contest. The show took place on 7 March 2009 at Studio 1 of Ostankino Technical Center in Moscow and hosted by Andrey Malakhov and Yana Churikova with Dmitry Shepelev hosting segments from the green room. Sixteen artists and songs participated and the winner was selected through a jury and a public televote. The show was broadcast on Channel One as well as online via the broadcaster's website eurovision.1tv.ru.

==== Competing entries ====
In November 2008, C1R announced a submission period for interested artists and composers to submit their entries. The initial format of the national final consisted of three stages: the first stage to select the song, the second stage to select three artists and the third stage to select the winning artist and song combination. The format was later amended by C1R where artists would compete with the songs they have submitted with. The broadcaster received over 1,000 submissions at the conclusion of the deadline. 50 entries were shortlisted from the received submissions and a jury panel selected the fifteen finalists for the national final. The competing acts were announced on 26 February 2009.

Following the announcement of the competing acts, it was revealed that four of the selected artists: Kvatro, Polina Griffith, Tim Rocks and Venger Collective, have submitted songs in violation of the 2009 contest rules, of which they were either publicly performed or released commercially before 1 October 2008. Kvatro and Polina Griffith changed their respective songs while Tim Rocks and Venger Collective remained with ineligible songs. On 5 March 2009, C1R announced that Anastasia Prikhodko would also participate in the national final with the song "Mamo" as a protest against her elimination from the 2009 Ukrainian Eurovision national final due to rule violations.

==== Final ====
The final took place on 7 March 2009. Sixteen entries competed and the winner was selected over two rounds of voting. In the first round, a public televote exclusively selected the top three entries to proceed to the second round, the superfinal. In the superfinal, the winner, "Mamo" performed by Anastasia Prikhodko, was determined through the votes of a jury panel. The jury consisted of Alexander Barannikov (secretary of the Eurovision Song Contest 2009 organising committee), Dzhohan Pollyeva (head of the Council for Humanitarian Cooperation of CIS countries), and television and music producers Yuriy Aksyuta, Kim Breitburg, Alexander Dulov, Igor Krutoy, Alexander Lunyov, Vladimir Matetsky, Ruben Oganesov, Larisa Sinelschikova and Maxim Fadeev. In addition to the performances of the competing entries, Eurovision Song Contest 2008 winner Dima Bilan, 2000 Russian Eurovision entrant Alsou, 2007 Russian Eurovision entrants Serebro, 2009 Azerbaijani Eurovision entrants AySel and Arash, 2009 French Eurovision entrant Patricia Kaas, 2004 and 2009 Greek Eurovision entrant Sakis Rouvas, and 2009 British Eurovision entrant Jade Ewen performed as guests.

Final – 7 March 2009
R/O	Artist	Song	Televote	Place
1	Anna Semenovich	"Love lovila"	8%	5
2	Tomas N'evergreen	"One More Try"	2%	11
3	Aleksa	"Ne dumat o tebe"	7%	6
4	Plazma	"Never Ending Story"	3%	8
5	Anastasia Prikhodko	"Mamo"	25%	1
6	Valeriya	"Back to Love"	14%	2
7	Nano	"Traitor"	2%	11
8	Tim Rocks	"The Happiest Man"	1%	15
9	Princessa Avenue	"Never, Never"	2%	11
10	Nikolay Fokeev	"You Can't Stop the Time"	1%	15
11	Venger Collective	"9 O'Clock Moscow"	3%	8
12	Polina Griffith	"Cry for You"	5%	7
13	Alexey Vorobyov	"Angelom byt"	10%	4
14	Unisex	"Ai-ai-ai"	2%	11
15	Arishata	"Breakdown"	3%	8
16	Kvatro	"Lyubovyu otvechay"	12%	3

Superfinal – 7 March 2009
R/O	Artist	Song	Points	Place
1	Anastasia Prikhodko	"Mamo"	6	1
2	Valeriya	"Back to Love"	5	2
3	Kvatro	"Lyubovyu otvechay"	0	3

=== Controversy ===
Prikhodko's win sparked allegations of vote-rigging. The song was first submitted, in a fully Ukrainian language version, for the 2009 Ukrainian preselection, but failed to qualify, before being submitted and eventually winning the Russian contest where it was performed in Russian and Ukrainian. Runner-up Valeriya's producer Yusif Prigozhin did not agree with the bilingual nature of Prikhodko's song stating: "A song performed in Ukrainian can’t have anything to do with Russia".

== At Eurovision ==
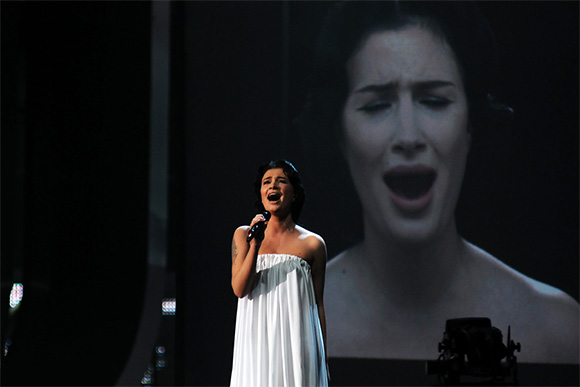
Anastasia Prikhodko at the Eurovision Song Contest 2009 in Moscow.

As the winner of the Eurovision Song Contest 2008 and host of the 2009 Contest, Russia automatically qualified for a place in the final, held on 16 May 2009. In addition to their participation in the final, Russia was assigned to vote in the second semi-final on 14 May 2009.

During the draw for running order on 16 March 2009, Russia was drawn to perform 10th in the final. In the final, Russia performed following Armenia and preceding Azerbaijan. The Russian performance featured Prikhodko in a white dress joined by five backing vocalists dressed in costumes with ethnic elements. The various screens of the stage displayed Prikhodko's face being progressively aged while singing the lyrics of the song. Russia placed 11th in the final, scoring 91 points. On 31 July 2009, the European Broadcasting Union released the split results for the final.

In Russia, both the semi-finals and the final were broadcast on Channel One Russia, with commentary provided by Yana Churikova for all shows, Aleksey Manuylov for the semi-finals and Philipp Kirkorov for the final. The voting spokesperson for Russia was Ingeborga Dapkūnaitė.

=== Voting ===
==== Points awarded to Russia ====
Points awarded to Russia (Final)
Score	Country
12 points	Armenia
10 points	Estonia
8 points	Belarus; Czech Republic; Ukraine
7 points	Israel; Lithuania
6 points	Azerbaijan; Latvia; Moldova
5 points	Germany
4 points	Turkey
3 points	Poland
2 points	
1 point	Cyprus

==== Points awarded by Russia ====
Points awarded by Russia (Semi-final 2)
Score	Country
12 points	Azerbaijan
10 points	Norway
8 points	Moldova
7 points	Ukraine
6 points	Estonia
5 points	Lithuania
4 points	Greece
3 points	Croatia
2 points	Albania
1 point	Slovakia

Points awarded by Russia (Final)
Score	Country
12 points	Norway
10 points	France
8 points	Estonia
7 points	Azerbaijan
6 points	United Kingdom
5 points	Armenia
4 points	Greece
3 points	Iceland
2 points	Ukraine
1 point	Moldova

==== Detailed voting results ====
For the 2009 Contest, a national jury of five members was assembled by every country in order to provide 50% of the votes in the final of the competition in combination with the results of the televoting. Russia's votes in the second semi-final were determined solely from the result of the public televote. The following members comprised the Russian jury:

- Igor Matvienko – producer
- Youddiph – singer, represented Russia in the 1994 contest
- Tamara Gverdtsiteli – singer
- Alexander Lunev – composer
- Elena Kiper – producer

Detailed voting results from Russia (Final)
R/O	Country	Results			Points
R/O	Country	Jury	Televoting	Combined	Points
01	Lithuania				
02	Israel				
03	France	12	5	17	10
04	Sweden		3	3	
05	Croatia				
06	Portugal				
07	Iceland		6	6	3
08	Greece	8	1	9	4
09	Armenia	1	8	9	5
10	Russia				
11	Azerbaijan	3	10	13	7
12	Bosnia and Herzegovina	2		2	
13	Moldova	4		4	1
14	Malta		2	2	
15	Estonia	7	7	14	8
16	Denmark				
17	Germany				
18	Turkey				
19	Albania				
20	Norway	10	12	22	12
21	Ukraine	5		5	2
22	Romania				
23	United Kingdom	6	4	10	6
24	Finland				
25	Spain				
