= Carry Me in Your Dreams =

2009 song by Kejsi Tola

Single by Kejsi Tola
- Released: 2008
- Genre: Pop
- Length: 3:07
- Label: Independent
- Composer(s): Edmond Zhulali
- Lyricist(s): Agim Doçi

Kejsi Tola singles chronology
"Një Minutë" (2008)	"Carry Me in Your Dreams" (2008)	"Qiellin do ta prek me ty" (2009)

Eurovision Song Contest 2009 entry
- Country: Albania
- Artist(s): Kejsi Tola
- Language: English
- Composer(s): Edmond Zhulali
- Lyricist(s): Agim Doçi

Finals performance
- Semi-final result: 7th
- Semi-final points: 73
- Final result: 17th
- Final points: 48

Entry chronology
- ◄ "Zemrën e lamë peng" (2008)
- "It's All About You" (2010) ►

"Carry Me in Your Dreams" is a song by Albanian singer Kejsi Tola, independently released as a single in 2008. It was written by Agim Doçi and composed by Edmond Zhulali. Musically, it is an English-language uptempo pop song, inspired by folk music and 1970s French pop. Its lyrics are a declaration of love by singing someone else's praise and also focuses on the longing between two separated people.

"Carry Me in Your Dreams" represented Albania in the Eurovision Song Contest 2009 in Moscow, Russia, after Tola won the country's pre-selection competition, Festivali i Këngës 47, with the Albanian-language version "Më merr në ëndërr". The country reached the 17th place in a field of 25, gaining a total of 48 points. During her Cirque du Soleil-described show of the song, she was performing against slightly dark-coloured LED screens and was accompanied by three dancers and two backing vocalists.

== Background and composition ==
In 2008, Kejsi Tola was announced as one of the twenty contestants selected to compete in the 47th edition of Festivali i Këngës, a competition to determine Albania's entrant for the Eurovision Song Contest 2009. Following the competition's rules, the lyrics of the participating entries had to be in the Albanian language. Tola took part with the song "Më merr në ëndërr", composed by Edmond Zhulali and written by Agim Doçi. For the purpose of the Tola's Eurovision Song Contest participation, the latter song was translated and remastered to "Carry Me in Your Dreams".

"Më merr në ëndërr" had a duration time of more than four minutes and contained a guitar solo in its beginnings as well as several instrumental passages throughout the song. Due to Eurovision's performative requirements on songs length, the song was then shortened and transformed to a solo-described number. Musically, "Carry Me in Your Dreams" is an uptempo electronic and disco song with "some text book schlager rhythms and key change". It was inspired by 1970s French pop and incorporates folk elements. Costa from ESCXtra noted a "psychedelic turbo-folk production". Its lyrics are a declaration of love by singing someone else's praise and also focuses on the longing between two separated people.

== Release and promotion ==
"Carry Me in Your Dreams" was independently released as a single on 1 January 2008 for download and streaming. The song was also included on the Eurovision Song Contest: Moscow 2009 compilation album on CD issued by EMI. For promotional purposes, Tola made diverse live appearances on multiple occasions in April 2009 to perform the song, including in Greece, Macedonia, Montenegro and the Netherlands, giving interviews and appearing on television shows. An accompanying music video for the song premiered prior to the start of the Eurovision Song Contest 2009 on 12 May 2009.

== Critical reception ==
"Carry Me in Your Dreams" has received generally positive reviews from music critics. In a later review for the song conducted by several ESCXtra staff members, the song's ethnic nature, instrumentation and lyrics, as well as Tola's vocal delivery were praised. Angelos of the same website labelled it as "catchy, fun and memorable" and found the song to be among the "few" songs that worked "well" in English after having been performed in Albanian. The website's Riccardo expressed praise towards the song's ethnic nature and the instrumental part near the end simultaneously calling it "mesmerising". Borislava, another editor, was similarly positive regarding the song's "Balkan" influence while as of Costa, the song "is often regarded as one of Albania's best entries".

== At Eurovision ==
=== Festivali i Këngës ===
The national broadcaster of Albania, Radio Televizioni Shqiptar (RTSH), organised the 47th edition of Festivali i Këngës to determine the country's participant for the Eurovision Song Contest 2009. The former consisted of two semi-finals on 19 and 20 December, and the grand final on 21 December 2008. Tola was chosen to represent the country in the contest, after gathering the maximum votes, 126 points, from an expert jury.

=== Moscow ===
The 54th edition of the Eurovision Song Contest took place in Moscow, Russia, and consisted of two semi-finals held on 12 and 14 May, and the grand final on 16 May 2009. According to the Eurovision rules at the time, each participating country, apart from the host country and the "Big Four", consisting of France, Germany, Spain, and the United Kingdom, were required to qualify from one of the two semi-finals to compete for the grand final. However, the top ten countries from the respective semi-final progressed to the grand final. On 28 January 2008, it was announced that "Carry Me in Your Dreams" would be performed in the second semi-final of the contest. During the second semi-final, Albania performed 16th, following Moldova and preceding Ukraine, and qualified for the grand final in seventh place with 73 points. At the grand final, the country performed 19th, following Turkey and preceding Norway. Albania finished in the 17th place in a field of 25 with 48 total points, ranking 23rd by the jury's 26 points as well as 11th by the televote of 81 points.

On stage, Tola performed against slightly dark LED screens whose colors were predominately a mixture of red, orange, yellow and white. The singer was accompanied by three male dancers and two female backing vocalists during her Cirque du Soleil-described performance of the song. She wore a short white and pink tulle dress and her backing vocalists long white dresses. Two of the dancers were dressed all in a black costume while the other wore a green glittery costume, covering his body and face. The glittery costume of the dancer was often compared to the fictional character of Spider-Man.

== Track listing ==
- Digital download
1. "Carry Me in Your Dreams" – 3:07

== Release history ==
Region	Date	Format	Label	Ref.
Various	2008	Digital download	Independent	
