= Switzerland in the Eurovision Song Contest 2009 =

- Eurovision Song Contest 2009
- Participating broadcaster: Swiss Broadcasting Corporation (SRG SSR)
- Country: Switzerland
- Selection process: Internal selection
- Announcement date: Artist: 19 January 2009; Song: 23 February 2009

Competing entry
- Song: "The Highest Heights"
- Artist: Lovebugs
- Songwriters: Adrian Sieber; Thomas Rechberger; Florian Senn

Placement
- Semi-final result: Failed to qualify (14th)

Participation chronology

Switzerland was represented at the Eurovision Song Contest 2009 with the song "The Highest Heights", written by Adrian Sieber, Thomas Rechberger, and Florian Senn, and performed by the band Lovebugs. The Swiss participating broadcaster, the Swiss Broadcasting Corporation (SRG SSR), internally selected its entry for the contest. "The Highest Heights" was presented to the public as the Swiss song on 23 February 2009.

Switzerland was drawn to compete in the first semi-final of the Eurovision Song Contest which took place on 12 May 2009. Performing during the show in position 8, "The Highest Heights" was not announced among the 10 qualifying entries of the first semi-final and therefore did not qualify to compete in the final. It was later revealed that Switzerland placed fourteenth out of the 18 participating countries in the semi-final with 15 points.

== Background ==
Prior to the 2009 contest, the Swiss Broadcasting Corporation (SRG SSR) had participated in the Eurovision Song Contest representing Switzerland forty-nine times since its first entry in 1956. It won that first edition of the contest with the song "Refrain" performed by Lys Assia. Its second victory was achieved in 1988 with the song "Ne partez pas sans moi" performed by Canadian singer Céline Dion. Following the introduction of semi-finals for the 2004, Switzerland had managed to participate in the final two times up to this point. In 2005, the internal selection of the song "Cool Vibes" performed by Estonian girl band Vanilla Ninja, qualified Switzerland to the final where they placed 8th. Due to their successful result in 2005, Switzerland was pre-qualified to compete directly in the final in 2006. Internal selections in 2007 and 2008 lead to the nation failing to qualify to the final on both occasions. In 2008, Paolo Meneguzzi and his song "Era stupendo" failed to qualify to the final placing 13th in their semi-final.

As part of its duties as participating broadcaster, SRG SSR organises the selection of its entry in the Eurovision Song Contest and broadcasts the event in the country. The broadcaster confirmed its intentions to participate at the 2009 contest on 11 July 2008. Along with its participation confirmation, the broadcaster also announced that its entry would be selected internally. SRG SSR has selected its entry for the Eurovision Song Contest through both national finals and internal selections in the past. Since 2005, the entry was internally selected.

== Before Eurovision ==
=== Internal selection ===
SRG SSR opened a submission period between 11 July 2008 and 20 October 2008 for interested artists and composers to submit their entries. Eligible artists were those that have had television and stage experience (live performances), have made at least one video and have released at least one CD which placed among the top 50 in an official chart. In addition to the public submission, the broadcaster was also in contact with individual composers and lyricists as well as the music industry to be involved in the selection process.

On 18 January 2009, Swiss newspaper Blick claimed that the band Lovebugs had been selected to represent Switzerland in Moscow, which was subsequently confirmed the following day during the SF 1 programme Glanz & Gloria. "The Highest Heights", which was released as part of their new album of the same name, was announced as the song on 23 February 2009; a poll on radio station DRS 1 prior to the announcement also indicated that listeners preferred "The Highest Heights" over the other songs on the album. Both the artist and song were selected from 55 entry submissions by a five-member jury panel consisting of music experts and representatives of the three broadcasters in Switzerland: the Swiss-German broadcaster Schweizer Fernsehen (SF), the Swiss-French broadcaster Télévision Suisse Romande (TSR) and the Swiss-Italian broadcaster Radiotelevisione svizzera (TSI). "The Highest Heights" was written by members of Lovebugs Adrian Sieber, Thomas Rechberger and Florian Senn. The official music video of the song was released on 7 March 2009.

== At Eurovision ==
According to Eurovision rules, all nations with the exceptions of the host country and the "Big Four" (France, Germany, Spain and the United Kingdom) are required to qualify from one of two semi-finals in order to compete for the final; the top nine songs from each semi-final as determined by televoting progress to the final, and a tenth was determined by back-up juries. The European Broadcasting Union (EBU) split up the competing countries into six different pots based on voting patterns from previous contests, with countries with favourable voting histories put into the same pot. On 30 January 2009, a special allocation draw was held which placed each country into one of the two semi-finals. Switzerland was placed into the first semi-final, to be held on 12 May 2009. The running order for the semi-finals was decided through another draw on 16 March 2009 and Switzerland was set to perform in position 8, following the entry from Andorra and before the entry from Turkey.

In Switzerland, three broadcasters that form SRG SSR aired the contest. Sven Epiney provided German commentary for both semi-finals and the final airing on SF zwei. Jean-Marc Richard and Nicolas Tanner provided French commentary for the first semi-final on TSR 2 and the final on TSR 1. Sandy Altermatt provided Italian commentary for the first semi-final on RSI La 2 and the final on RSI La 1. The Swiss spokesperson, who announced the Swiss votes during the final, was Cécile Bähler.

=== Semi-final ===
Lovebugs took part in technical rehearsals on 3 and 7 May, followed by dress rehearsals on 11 and 12 May. The Swiss performance featured the members of Lovebugs performing on stage in a band set-up. The LED screens displayed a city with skyscrapers that turned from nighttime to daytime, which later transitioned to a snowy mountain chain and ultimately a space imagery with falling stars. The performance also featured several effects including smoke and a wind machine.

At the end of the show, Switzerland was not announced among the top 10 entries in the first semi-final and therefore failed to qualify to compete in the final. It was later revealed that Switzerland placed fourteenth in the semi-final, receiving a total of 15 points.

=== Voting ===
The voting system for 2009 involved each country awarding points from 1-8, 10 and 12, with the points in the final being decided by a combination of 50% national jury and 50% televoting. Each nation's jury consisted of five music industry professionals who are citizens of the country they represent. This jury judged each entry based on: vocal capacity; the stage performance; the song's composition and originality; and the overall impression by the act. In addition, no member of a national jury was permitted to be related in any way to any of the competing acts in such a way that they cannot vote impartially and independently.

Below is a breakdown of points awarded to Switzerland and awarded by Switzerland in the first semi-final and grand final of the contest. The nation awarded its 12 points to Turkey in the semi-final and the final of the contest.

==== Points awarded to Switzerland ====
Points awarded to Switzerland (Semi-final 1)
| Score | Country |
|---|---|
| 12 points | |
| 10 points | |
| 8 points | |
| 7 points | |
| 6 points | |
| 5 points | Finland |
| 4 points | |
| 3 points | |
| 2 points | Andorra; Belarus; Bosnia and Herzegovina; Portugal; Sweden |
| 1 point | |

==== Points awarded by Switzerland ====
Points awarded by Switzerland (Semi-final 1)
| Score | Country |
|---|---|
| 12 points | Turkey |
| 10 points | Portugal |
| 8 points | Bosnia and Herzegovina |
| 7 points | Iceland |
| 6 points | Macedonia |
| 5 points | Israel |
| 4 points | Sweden |
| 3 points | Malta |
| 2 points | Montenegro |
| 1 point | Armenia |

Points awarded by Switzerland (Final)
| Score | Country |
|---|---|
| 12 points | Turkey |
| 10 points | Portugal |
| 8 points | Norway |
| 7 points | France |
| 6 points | Albania |
| 5 points | Iceland |
| 4 points | Bosnia and Herzegovina |
| 3 points | Spain |
| 2 points | Greece |
| 1 point | Israel |

==== Detailed voting results ====
The following members comprised the Swiss jury:

- Judith Wernli – DRS 3 radio presenter
- Giovanni Zamai – manager of MTV Suisse
- Michael von der Heide – singer, actor, musician, later represented Switzerland in the 2010 contest
- Jean-Marie Fontana – director of Universal Music Switzerland
- Emel Aykanat – singer

Detailed voting results from Switzerland (Final)
| R/O | Country | Results | | | Points |
| R/O | Country | Jury | Televoting | Combined | Points |
|---|---|---|---|---|---|
| 01 | Lithuania | | | | |
| 02 | Israel | 5 | | 5 | 1 |
| 03 | France | 10 | 1 | 11 | 7 |
| 04 | Sweden | 4 | | 4 | |
| 05 | Croatia | | 4 | 4 | |
| 06 | Portugal | 7 | 8 | 15 | 10 |
| 07 | Iceland | 6 | 2 | 8 | 5 |
| 08 | Greece | | 5 | 5 | 2 |
| 09 | Armenia | 2 | | 2 | |
| 10 | Russia | | | | |
| 11 | Azerbaijan | | | | |
| 12 | Bosnia and Herzegovina | | 7 | 7 | 4 |
| 13 | Moldova | 1 | | 1 | |
| 14 | Malta | | | | |
| 15 | Estonia | 3 | | 3 | |
| 16 | Denmark | | | | |
| 17 | Germany | | | | |
| 18 | Turkey | 8 | 12 | 20 | 12 |
| 19 | Albania | | 10 | 10 | 6 |
| 20 | Norway | 12 | 3 | 15 | 8 |
| 21 | Ukraine | | | | |
| 22 | Romania | | | | |
| 23 | United Kingdom | | | | |
| 24 | Finland | | | | |
| 25 | Spain | | 6 | 6 | 3 |
