= Dr. Flori =

Albanian singer and songwriter (1976–2014)

- Born: Florian Kondi; February 28, 1979; Kuçovë, PSR Albania
- Died: November 17, 2014 (aged 35) Tirana, Albania
- Genres: Pop; Rap; Hip hop
- Occupations: Singer, songwriter, rapper
- Years active: 1996–2014

Florian Kondi (28 February 1979, Kuçovë – 17 November 2014, Tirana), known professionally as Dr. Flori, was an Albanian singer, songwriter and rapper. He was one of the founding members of the group West Side Family, which had great success with songs such as Tirona and Hou çike. Until his death, Dr. Flori worked with many singers and actors, most notably with Aurela Gaçe and Ermal Mamaqi.

== Career ==
=== West Side Family (1996–2008) ===
Dr. Flori, along with Landi and Miri, in 1996 created the group West Side Family. They wrote and sang their first songs, such as Tik-Tak, and other songs, but in 2002 they sang their first well-known song, which became a hit for their time. Called Tirona, this song was of a political nature and aimed support for politician Edi Rama in the election campaign for the Socialist Party. This song was very well received in Albania and Kosovo. In 2002, the group took part in the Kënga Magjike show with the song Mesazh. Next year they took part in the contest again with the song O çike çike' , which later would become one of their hit songs. In the final they took 87 points which was enough to secure fourth place and they won a public price.

After three years, more precisely in 2006, Dr. Flori and the West Side Family took part again in the show with a pleasant song, titled Ne krahë e tu dua te jem, which secured third place in the final with 215 points, behind Ledina Çelo and the winner Armend Rexhepagiqi; However, he saved the group from obscurity by winning the award for the best lyrics.

Their first participation in the Festivali i Këngës in December 2008, where the winner would be selected as the representative of Albania in the Eurovision Song Contest for the following year (2009). The group took part in the song "Jehonë" written and composed by Dr. Flori himself. In the semi-finals, the group also sang other songs with another famous Albanian singer, Aurela Gaçe. Gaçe was also involved in the band's official song that was issued for the final. In the final, they were against 19 other artists, and came in third place overall with 118 points, being defeated by Juliana Pasha and Luiz Ejlli by only one point, and the eventual winner Kejsi Tola by eight points. If they had won, they would have been the first group to represent Albania within the song contest.

=== Solo career (2008–2014) ===
Despite dissolving the West Side Family in 2008 and becoming a solo singer, in 2010, he had successfully collaborated with Gaçe and Marcellin with the song "Origjinale", which became the hit of the summer. He continued his success in the next year by launching the song "Ça na ke", which soon became very popular. In 2011, he participated for the Kënga Magjike in 2013 with the song "S'ma ndjen" and became a hit. A month later, he was ready for the 50th edition of the Festivali i Këngës with the song "Personale", reaching 8th place. In 2012, he participated in Top Fest along with Ymer Fatmire with the song "Passion". They reached the semi-finals on 6 June 2012. In December 2012, Dr. Flori again participated in the 51st edition of the Festivali i Këngës together with the singer Fabian Basha with Jam ti!, reaching 9th place, tying with Rosela Gjylbegu. In 2013, Dr. Flori released "Zemërthyer", a reworked version of Personale. The song was described the struggle ahead of parliamentary elections in Albania in 2013. He wrote his final song "Më rrëmbe", which was sung by Rezarta Smaja in the 53rd edition of the Festivali i Këngës.

== Death ==
In November 2014, Dr. Flori's health declined, and he died in the emergency room of Mother Teresa Hospital. While the exact cause of his death was initially unclear, media reports suggested a drug overdose.
