= Bulgaria in the Eurovision Song Contest 2009 =

- Eurovision Song Contest 2009
- Participating broadcaster: Bulgarian National Television (BNT)
- Country: Bulgaria
- Selection process: Bŭlgarskata pesen v „Evroviziya 2009”
- Selection date: 21 February 2009

Competing entry
- Song: "Illusion"
- Artist: Krassimir Avramov
- Songwriters: Krassimir Avramov; William Tabanou; Casie Tabanou

Placement
- Semi-final result: Failed to qualify (16th)

Participation chronology

Bulgaria was represented at the Eurovision Song Contest 2009 with the song "Illusion", written by Krassimir Avramov, William Tabanou, and Casie Tabanou, and performed by Avramov himself. The Bulgarian participating broadcaster, Bulgarian National Television (BNT), organised the national final Bŭlgarskata pesen v „Evroviziya 2009” in order to select its entry for the contest. 45 entries were selected to participate in the first phase of the national final, Bŭdi zvezda, which consisted of three monthly selections. Nine entries qualified to compete in Bŭlgarskata pesen v „Evroviziya 2009” which consisted of two shows: a semi-final and a final, held on 24 January 2009 and 21 February 2009, respectively. Eighteen entries competed in the semi-final and the top nine songs as determined by an eight-member jury panel qualified to the final alongside three pre-qualified songs. In the final, public televoting exclusively selected "Illusion" performed by Avramov as the winning entry with 19,553 votes.

Bulgaria was drawn to compete in the first semi-final of the Eurovision Song Contest which took place on 12 May 2009. Performing during the show in position 11, "Illusion" was not announced among the 10 qualifying entries of the first semi-final and therefore did not qualify to compete in the final. It was later revealed that Bulgaria placed sixteenth out of the 18 participating countries in the semi-final with 7 points.

== Background ==
Prior to the 2009 contest, Bulgarian National Television (BNT) had participated in the Eurovision Song Contest representing Bulgaria four times since its first entry in 2005. It achieved its best result in 2007 with the song "Water" performed by Elitsa Todorova and Stoyan Yankoulov, which placed fifth. To this point, their 2007 entry is also the only Bulgarian entry to have qualified to the Eurovision final; the nation had failed to qualify to the final with their other three entries. In 2008, "DJ, Take Me Away" by Deep Zone and Balthazar failed to qualify to the final.

As part of its duties as participating broadcaster, BNT organises the selection of its entry in the Eurovision Song Contest and broadcasts the event in the country. The broadcaster confirmed its participation in the 2009 contest on 6 July 2008. Since 2005, BNT has organised a national final in order to select its entry, a selection procedure that continued for its 2009 entry. The 2009 Bulgarian national final took place over two phases.

== Before Eurovision ==
=== Bŭdi zvezda ===
Bŭdi zvezda (Be a Star) was the first phase of the national final format developed by BNT which determined the artist and song that would represent Bulgaria at the Eurovision Song Contest 2009. The competition consisted of three monthly selections between October and December 2008, held at the National Palace of Culture in Sofia. All shows were hosted by Neli Atanasova and Dragomir Draganov and broadcast on BNT 1 as well as online via the broadcaster's website bnt.bg.

==== Competing entries ====
On 6 July 2008, BNT opened a submission period for artists and songwriters to submit their entries until 19 September 2008. Songs were required to contain partial Bulgarian involvement. By the end of the deadline, the broadcaster received 45 eligible entries out of 54 submitted, which were announced on 20 September 2008.

Artist	Song	Songwriter(s)
Anna Star	"Stranger"	Johannes Carlsson, Anna Star
Annayah	"Az te chakam" (Аз те чакам)	Rosi Ovcharova
Antoniya Markova	"Don't Leave by the Day"	Pepi Pisarski
Biby Michael and Friends	"Vŭlshebni noti" (Вълшебни ноти)	Biby Michael, Zhiva Kyuldzhieva
Bobi Kokera, Bleki and Sunnie	"Tozi pŭt" (Този път)	Pepi Kostov, Bobi Kokera
Deyan Dzhenkov	"Imam tvoeto ime" (Имам твоето име)	Rumyana Ivanova, Dani Milev
Emil Sokolov	"Deystvitelnost ili izmama" (Действителност или измама)	Emil Sokolov, Petar Kamenovski
Emiliya Valenti	"S teb" (С теб)	Stanislava Dimitrova-Sunnie, Aleks Husev
Fanagora and Milena Peeva	"Love Never Ends"	Ivan Tsanov, Kalina Nanovska
Freeway	"Sama" (Сама)	Ivan Popov-Iven, Zlatoela Dimitrova
Georgi Varbanov	"Europe Is My Home!"	Georgi Varbanov
Gergana Dimova	"Yasno slŭntse" (Ясно слънце)	Dimcho Delev
Hari Ot Balgaryia	"Bez dumi" (Без думи)	Hari
Iliyan Tsvetanov	"Tozi ritŭm" (Този ритъм)	Alexander Kiprov jr., Alexander Kiprov
Iskra and Misha Iliev	"Dokosni me" (Докосни ме)	Andro Stubel, Stoyan Stoyanov
Iskren Petsov	"Zashto se vŭrna" (Защо се върна)	Iskren Petsov
Itso Petroff and Priyateli	"Rokendrol izkustvo" (Рокендрол изкуство)	Itso Petroff, Konstantin Pashkulev
Ivelina	"Ready for Love"	Lubomir Boyanov, Ivan Laskov
Just Elly	"My Song"	Kiril Yanev, Elka Yankova
Konkurent	"Placha v noshtta" (Плача в нощта)	Konkurent
Lazar Kisyov	"You're Not Alone"	Lazar Kisyov
Lorado	"More ot ekstaz" (Море от екстаз)	Krasimir Krastev, Lorado
Mario Denev	"Lipsvash mi tatko" (Липсваш ми татко)	Mario Denev
Mario Marinov	"La ragazza che ho lasciato"	Mario Marinov
Martin Aleksandrov	"Mi fai male"	Zhanet
Monika Kirovska	"I Won"	Tsvetan Vlaykov
Moto	"Razstoyaniya" (Разстояния)	Nikolay Tomov
Perfect Stranger	"I Promise"	Konstantin Varbanov
Petya Hristova	"Sacred Journey"	Petya Hristova, Arnold Herman
Plamen Penev	"Dalechen svyat" (Далечен свят)	Plamen Penev, Petar Penev
Prima Vista	"Let's Spread Love"	Ilko Drenkov, Valentin Penzov
Ruth	"Sometimes"	Tomi Stefanov, Zhana Dushkova
Sahara	"Don't Kiss for Money"	Stefaan Yves Geert Fernande, Ingrid Mank
Stefan Ilchev	"Get Up"	Veselin Kalchev, Iordanka Ivanova
Sunay Chalakov	"Neshto ludo" (Нещо лудо)	Alexander Kiprov, Sunay Chalakov
Svetozar Hristov	"Borrow from the Shadow"	Svetozar Hristov, Ventsislava Tumangelova
Tedi Slavcheva feat. Teni and Iva	"Don't Look for Me"	Tedi Slavcheva, Teni Omede
Teodora Kutsarova	"Droga" (Дрога)	Petko Ivanov, Teodora Kutsarova
Tereza Kolarova	"Samo edno more" (Само едно море)	Kamen Nikolov
Tsetso Vlaykov	"What Does It Take"	Tsvetan Vlaykov
Vatticana	"Sun Is Shining"	Detelin Dimitrov, Rosen Neshkov, Lubomir Dyulgerov, Jan Lund Dahlgren
Venelina Milanova	"Neka s pesen" (Нека с песен)	Simeon Smolev, Venelina Milanova
X-R@Y	"We"	Nikolay Dimitrov, Veselin Kirev, Nikolay Nikolov
Zheni Karavacheva	"Dumi" (Думи)	Ivan Lechev, Vanya Shtereva
Zona	"Senki" (Сенки)	Hristo Markov, Alexander Krastev, Biser Veselinov

==== Shows ====
===== October selection =====
The October selection took place between 2 and 23 October 2008. Three entries qualified to the final from each semi-final. A jury panel first selected one song to advance and the remaining entries then faced a public televote which determined an additional two qualifiers. In the final, the three entries that qualified to Bŭlgarskata pesen v „Evroviziya 2009” were selected exclusively by public televoting. An additional two entries, "Ready for Love" performed by Ivelina and "Razstoyaniya" performed by Moto, received wildcards and qualified to Bŭlgarskata pesen v „Evroviziya 2009”.

Key

Jury qualifier Public vote qualifier Wildcard qualifier

Semi-final 1 – 2 October 2008
R/O	Artist	Song	Televote	Place	Result
1	Monika Kirovska	"I Won"	2.28%	5	—N/a
2	Emil Sokolov	"Deystvitelnost ili izmama"	4.86%	4	—N/a
3	Ivelina	"Ready for Love"	32.22%	2	Advanced
4	Perfect Stranger	"I Promise"	38.60%	1	Advanced
5	Venelina Milanova	"Neka s pesen"	22.04%	3	Advanced

Semi-final 2 – 9 October 2008
R/O	Artist	Song	Televote	Place	Result
1	Iskra and Misha Iliev	"Dokosni me"	41.26%	1	Advanced
2	Prima Vista	"Let's Spread Love"	17.14%	3	Advanced
3	Konkurent	"Placha v noshtta"	4.23%	5	—N/a
4	Mario Marinov	"La ragazza che ho lasciato"	14.40%	4	—N/a
5	Tereza Kolarova	"Samo edno more"	22.97%	2	Advanced

Semi-final 3 – 16 October 2008
R/O	Artist	Song	Televote	Place	Result
1	Iliyan Tsvetanov	"Tozi ritŭm"	28.52%	2	Advanced
2	Teodora Kutsarova	"Droga"	11.42%	4	—N/a
3	Ruth	"Sometimes"	6.25%	5	Advanced
4	Deyan Dzhenkov	"Imam tvoeto ime"	37.21%	1	Advanced
5	Moto	"Razstoyaniya"	16.60%	3	Wildcard

Final – 23 October 2008
R/O	Artist	Song	Televote	Place	Result
1	Prima Vista	"Let's Spread Love"	19.66%	2	Advanced
2	Perfect Stranger	"I Promise"	12.98%	4	—N/a
3	Tereza Kolarova	"Samo edno more"	9.10%	6	—N/a
4	Ruth	"Sometimes"	2.23%	9	—N/a
5	Deyan Dzhenkov	"Imam tvoeto ime"	24.14%	1	Advanced
6	Ivelina	"Ready for Love"	10.43%	5	Wildcard
7	Iliyan Tsvetanov	"Tozi ritŭm"	2.55%	8	—N/a
8	Iskra and Misha Iliev	"Dokosni me"	13.46%	3	Advanced
9	Venelina Milanova	"Neka s pesen"	5.45%	7	—N/a

===== November selection =====
The November selection took place between 30 October and 13 November 2008. Three entries qualified to the final from each semi-final. A jury panel first selected one songs to advance and the remaining entries then faced a public televote which determined an additional two qualifiers. In the final, the three entries that qualified to Bŭlgarskata pesen v „Evroviziya 2009” were selected exclusively by public televoting.

Prior to the first semi-final, "Don't Kiss for Money" performed by Sahara was disqualified from the competition as the song had been performed before 1 October 2008. Bobi Kokera, Bleki and Sunnie withdrew from the final as they were unable to appear in the show due to illness.

Key

Jury qualifier Public vote qualifier Entry withdrawn/disqualified

Semi-final 1 – 30 October 2008
R/O	Artist	Song	Televote	Place	Result
1	Lorado	"More ot ekstaz"	2.78%	4	—N/a
2	Fanagora and Milena Peeva	"Love Never Ends"	28.61%	2	Advanced
3	Itso Petroff and Priyateli	"Rokendrol izkustvo"	16.67%	3	Advanced
4	Gergana Dimova	"Yasno slŭntse"	51.94%	1	Advanced
5	~~Sahara~~	~~"Don't Kiss for Money"~~	—	—	Disqualified

Semi-final 2 – 6 November 2008
R/O	Artist	Song	Televote	Place	Result
1	Plamen Penev	"Dalechen svyat"	20.99%	3	Advanced
2	Zheni Karavacheva	"Dumi"	10.56%	5	—N/a
3	Bobi Kokera, Bleki and Sunnie	"Tozi pŭt"	23.01%	2	Advanced
4	Emiliya Valenti	"S teb"	32.94%	1	Advanced
5	Hari Ot Balgaryia	"Bez dumi"	11.66%	4	—N/a

Semi-final 3 – 13 November 2008
R/O	Artist	Song	Televote	Place	Result
1	Annayah	"Az te chakam"	36.99%	1	Advanced
2	Georgi Varbanov	"Europe Is My Home!"	5.02%	5	—N/a
3	Lazar Kisyov	"You're Not Alone"	13.83%	3	Advanced
4	Antoniya Markova	"Don't Leave by the Day"	35.84%	2	Advanced
5	Mario Denev	"Lipsvash mi tatko"	8.22%	4	—N/a

Final – 20 November 2008
R/O	Artist	Song	Televote	Place	Result
1	Antoniya Markova	"Don't Leave by the Day"	8.83%	5	—N/a
2	Plamen Penev	"Dalechen svyat"	14.26%	2	Advanced
3	~~Bobi Kokera, Bleki and Sunnie~~	~~"Tozi pŭt"~~	—	—	Withdrew
4	Itso Petroff and Priyateli	"Rokendrol izkustvo"	3.44%	8	—N/a
5	Lazar Kisyov	"You're Not Alone"	4.56%	7	—N/a
6	Gergana Dimova	"Yasno slŭntse"	41.42%	1	Advanced
7	Annayah	"Az te chakam"	8.97%	4	—N/a
8	Fanagora and Milena Peeva	"Love Never Ends"	6.06%	6	—N/a
9	Emiliya Valenti	"S teb"	12.46%	3	Advanced

===== December selection =====
The December selection took place between 27 November and 11 December 2008. Three entries qualified to the final from each semi-final. A jury panel first selected one songs to advance and the remaining entries then faced a public televote which determined an additional two qualifiers. In the final, the three entries that qualified to Bŭlgarskata pesen v „Evroviziya 2009” were selected exclusively by public televoting.

Key

Jury qualifier Public vote qualifier

Semi-final 1 – 27 November 2008
R/O	Artist	Song	Televote	Place	Result
1	Vatticana	"Sun Is Shining"	34.96%	2	Advanced
2	Anna Star	"Stranger"	4.87%	4	—N/a
3	Svetozar Hristov	"Borrow from the Shadow"	10.30%	3	Advanced
4	Just Elly	"My Song"	0.66%	5	—N/a
5	Tedi Slavcheva feat. Teni and Iva	"Don't Look for Me"	49.11%	1	Advanced

Semi-final 2 – 4 December 2008
R/O	Artist	Song	Televote	Place	Result
1	Freeway	"Sama"	30.71%	2	Advanced
2	Biby Michael and Friends	"Vŭlshebni noti"	7.47%	3	—N/a
3	Iskren Petsov	"Zashto se vŭrna"	5.81%	4	Advanced
4	Sunay Chalakov	"Neshto ludo"	53.11%	1	Advanced
5	Tsetso Vlaykov	"What Does It Take"	2.90%	5	—N/a

Semi-final 3 – 11 December 2008
R/O	Artist	Song	Televote	Place	Result
1	X-R@Y	"We"	15.09%	3	—N/a
2	Stefan Ilchev	"Get Up"	37.12%	1	Advanced
3	Petya Hristova	"Sacred Journey"	3.77%	5	—N/a
4	Zona	"Senki"	32.70%	2	Advanced
5	Martin Aleksandrov	"Mi fai male"	11.32%	4	Advanced

Final – 18 December 2008
R/O	Artist	Song	Televote	Place	Result
1	Freeway	"Sama"	8.84%	6	—N/a
2	Martin Aleksandrov	"Mi fai male"	8.35%	7	—N/a
3	Svetozar Hristov	"Borrow from the Shadow"	1.80%	8	—N/a
4	Sunay Chalakov	"Neshto ludo"	11.62%	5	—N/a
5	Tedi Slavcheva feat. Teni and Iva	"Don't Look for Me"	18.33%	2	Advanced
6	Zona	"Senki"	20.45%	1	Advanced
7	Iskren Petsov	"Zashto se vŭrna"	0.98%	9	—N/a
8	Vatticana	"Sun Is Shining"	12.77%	4	—N/a
9	Stefan Ilchev	"Get Up"	16.86%	3	Advanced

=== Bŭlgarskata pesen v „Evroviziya 2009” ===
Bŭlgarskata pesen v „Evroviziya 2009” (The Bulgarian song in Eurovision 2009) was the second phase of the national final format developed by BNT which determined the artist and song that would represent Bulgaria at the Eurovision Song Contest 2009. The competition consisted of a semi-final on 24 January 2009 and a final on 21 February 2009, held at the National Palace of Culture in Sofia. Both shows were hosted by Neli Atanasova and Dragomir Simeonov and broadcast on BNT 1 as well as online via the broadcaster's website bnt.bg.

==== Competing entries ====
On 1 October 2008, BNT opened a submission period for artists and songwriters to submit their entries until 19 December 2008. Songs were required to contain partial Bulgarian involvement. By the end of the deadline, the broadcaster received 38 entries. On 20 December 2008, the eighteen artists and songs selected for the semi-final of the competition were announced. Eleven of the entries were the qualifiers of Bŭdi zvezda, while the remaining seven entries were selected by a twelve-member committee from the submitted songs; the committee also selected the two wildcard qualifiers of Bŭdi zvezda. An additional three entries were produced by BNT and automatically qualified for the final of the competition.

Among the artists, Mariana Popova previously represented Bulgaria at the Eurovision Song Contest 2006, while JuraTone previously represented Bulgaria at the Eurovision Song Contest 2008 as part of the group Deep Zone. On 10 January 2009, "Ring the Bells" performed by Vessy was withdrawn due to copyright issues and replaced with the song "Don't Break My Heart" performed by Erilien and Najam Sheraz.

Artist	Song	Songwriter(s)	Selection
Dani Milev	"Nyama vreme" (Няма време)	Dani Milev, Dobrin Vekilov-Doni	Open submission
Deyan Dzhenkov	"Imam tvoeto ime" (Имам твоето име)	Dani Milev, Rumyana Ivanova	Bŭdi zvezda
Emiliya Valenti	"S teb" (С теб)	Alex Nushev, Stanislava Dimitrova	Bŭdi zvezda
Erilien and Najam Sheraz	"Don't Break My Heart"	Paula Pavlova, Najam Sheraz	Open submission
Gergana Dimova	"Yasno slŭntse" (Ясно слънце)	Dimcho Delev	Bŭdi zvezda
Grafa	"Vrag" (Враг)	Vladimir Ampov-Grafa, Gergana Turiyska	Produced by BNT
Iskra and Misha Iliev	"Dokosni me" (Докосни ме)	Stoyan Stoyanov, Andro Stubel	Bŭdi zvezda
Ivelina	"Ready for Love"	Lubomir Boyanov, Ivan Laskov	Bŭdi zvezda
JuraTone feat. Lady B	"Chance to Love You"	Lubomir Savov, Michael Johnson	Open submission
Krassimir Avramov	"Illusion"	Krassimir Avramov, William Tabanou, Casie Tabanou	Open submission
Mariana Popova	"Crazy"	Zheni Dzhambazova, Ivan Ivanov, Elina Gavrilova	Produced by BNT
Moto	"Razstoyaniya" (Разстояния)	Nikolay Tomov	Bŭdi zvezda
Nora	"It's Not Right"	Biser Ivanov, Nora Karaivanova	Open submission
Plamen Penev	"Dalechen svyat" (Далечен свят)	Petar Pesev, Plamen Penev	Bŭdi zvezda
Poli Genova	"One Lifetime Is Not Enough"	Ivan Kutikov, Jim Peterik	Produced by BNT
Prima Vista	"Let's Spread Love"	Valentin Penzov, Ilko Drenkov	Bŭdi zvezda
Sahara	"Don't Kiss for Money"	Stefaan Yves Geert Fernande, Ingrid Mank	Open submission
Stefan Dobrev	"Everlasting Love"	Vladi Tosetto, Diana Winter	Open submission
Stefan Ilchev	"Get Up"	Veselin Kalchev, Iordanka Ivanova	Bŭdi zvezda
Tedi Slavcheva feat. Teni and Iva	"Don't Look for Me"	Teni Omede, Tedi Slavcheva	Bŭdi zvezda
Zona	"Senki" (Сенки)	Hristo Markov, Alexander Krastev, Biser Veselinov	Bŭdi zvezda

==== Semi-final ====
The semi-final took place on 24 January 2009. Nine entries qualified to the final based on the votes of a jury panel. The eight-person jury consisted of Vasil Naydenov, Kiril Marichkov, Toncho Rusev, Yavor Kirin, Elitsa Todorova, Stoyan Yankoulov, Orlin Pavlov and Kalin Veliov. In addition to the performances of the competing entries, guest performers were the three pre-qualified artists: Grafa, Mariana Popova and Poli Genova.

Semi-final – 24 January 2009
R/O	Artist	Song	Result
1	Ivelina	"Ready for Love"	Advanced
2	Moto	"Razstoyaniya"	Advanced
3	Deyan Dzhenkov	"Imam tvoeto ime"	—N/a
4	Gergana Dimova	"Yasno slŭntse"	—N/a
5	Stefan Dobrev	"Everlasting Love"	Advanced
6	Prima Vista	"Let's Spread Love"	—N/a
7	Erilien and Najam Sheraz	"Don't Break My Heart"	—N/a
8	Iskra and Misha Iliev	"Dokosni me"	—N/a
9	Sahara	"Don't Kiss for Money"	Advanced
10	Plamen Penev	"Dalechen svyat"	—N/a
11	JuraTone feat. Lady B	"Chance to Love You"	Advanced
12	Zona	"Senki"	—N/a
13	Stefan Ilchev	"Get Up"	Advanced
14	Nora	"It's Not Right"	Advanced
15	Emiliya Valenti	"S teb"	—N/a
16	Krassimir Avramov	"Illusion"	Advanced
17	Tedi Slavcheva feat. Teni and Iva	"Don't Look for Me"	—N/a
18	Dani Milev	"Nyama vreme"	Advanced

==== Final ====
The final took place on 21 February 2009. The nine semi-final qualifiers along alongside the three automatic qualifiers competed and "Illusion" performed by Krassimir Avramov was selected as the winner exclusively by public televoting. In addition to the performances of the competing entries, the guest performer was Russian Eurovision Song Contest 1995 entrant Philipp Kirkorov.

Final – 21 February 2009
R/O	Artist	Song	Televote	Place
1	Stefan Ilchev	"Get Up"	1,038	7
2	Moto	"Razstoyaniya"	132	12
3	Poli Genova	"One Lifetime Is Not Enough"	4,135	2
4	Dani Milev	"Nyama vreme"	843	9
5	Ivelina	"Ready for Love"	890	8
6	Grafa	"Vrag"	1,377	5
7	Sahara	"Don't Kiss for Money"	1,128	6
8	Mariana Popova	"Crazy"	2,976	3
9	JuraTone feat. Lady B	"Chance to Love You"	715	10
10	Stefan Dobrev	"Everlasting Love"	408	11
11	Krassimir Avramov	"Illusion"	19,553	1
12	Nora	"It's Not Right"	2,023	4

=== Controversy ===
Following the Bulgarian national final, several Bulgarian musicians openly issued letters demanding Avramov to withdraw from the Eurovision Song Contest whilst questioning the legitimacy of the voting and criticising his performing abilities. A protest took place in front of the BNT Headquarters on 24 February where a petition signed by over 3,000 people was submitted, while a live debate regarding the participation of Avramov took place during a special broadcast of Bŭdi zvezda on 26 February. During the debate, the singer defended his Eurovision participation and stated that "Illusion" would be reworked for the contest.

=== Promotion ===
Krassimir Avramov made several appearances across Europe to specifically promote "Illusion" as the Bulgarian Eurovision entry. Between 5 and 6 April, Avramov took part in promotional activities in Macedonia where he appeared during the MTV 1 show Iselenicki jbox and 100% Eurosong. Avramov also took part in promotional activities in Greece between 10 and 12 April which included an appearance during the Mega Channel morning programme Omorfos kosmos to proi. On 14 April, Avramov performed during the Antena 1 morning show Neatza cu Răzvan și Dani in Romania. On 17 April, Avramov performed during the UKeurovision Preview Party, which was held at the La Scala venue in London, United Kingdom and hosted by Nicki French and Paddy O'Connell. On 18 April, Avramov performed during the Eurovision Promo Concert event which was held at the Amsterdam Marcanti venue in Amsterdam, Netherlands and hosted by Marga Bult and Maggie MacNeal. On 23 April, Avramov concluded promotional activities in Turkey where he made radio and television appearances.

In addition to his international appearances, on 27 March, Avramov performed "Illusion" during the annual Lions Day with the United Nations event which was held at the National Archaeological Museum in Sofia. On 28 April, Avramov performed as the closing act of the music competition series Music Idol.

== At Eurovision ==
The Eurovision Song Contest 2009 took place at the Olympic Stadium in Moscow, Russia and consisted of two semi-finals held on 12 and 14 May, respectively, and the final on 16 May 2009. According to Eurovision rules, all nations with the exceptions of the host country and the "Big Four" (France, Germany, Spain and the United Kingdom) are required to qualify from one of two semi-finals in order to compete for the final; the top nine songs from each semi-final as determined by televoting progress to the final, and a tenth was determined by back-up juries. The European Broadcasting Union (EBU) split up the competing countries into six different pots based on voting patterns from previous contests, with countries with favourable voting histories put into the same pot. On 30 January 2009, a special allocation draw was held which placed each country into one of the two semi-finals. Bulgaria was placed into the first semi-final, to be held on 12 May 2009. The running order for the semi-finals was decided through another draw on 16 March 2009 and as one of the seven wildcard countries, Bulgaria chose to perform in position 11, following the entry from Israel and before the entry from Iceland.

The two semi-finals and the final were broadcast in Bulgaria on BNT 1 with commentary by Elena Rosberg and Georgi Kushvaliev. The Bulgarian spokesperson, who announced the Bulgarian votes during the final, was Joanna Dragneva who represented Bulgaria at the 2008 contest as the lead singer of Deep Zone.

=== Semi-final ===
Krassimir Avramov took part in technical rehearsals on 4 and 8 May, followed by dress rehearsals on 11 and 12 May. The Bulgarian performance featured Avramov performing in a medieval costume, joined on stage by three backing vocalists at the front of the stage and two dancers on stilts at the back performing an acrobatic routine. The LED screens displayed fire and metal cogs, and the performance also featured the use of a wind machine. The three backing vocalists that joined Krassimir Avramov were Albena Veskova, Anna Lozanova and Petya Buyuklieva, while the dancers were Carin Noland and Trey Knight.

At the end of the show, Bulgaria was not announced among the top 10 entries in the first semi-final and therefore failed to qualify to compete in the final. It was later revealed that Bulgaria placed sixteenth in the semi-final, receiving a total of 7 points.

=== Voting ===
Below is a breakdown of points awarded to Bulgaria and awarded by Bulgaria in the first semi-final and grand final of the contest. The nation awarded its 12 points to Turkey in the semi-final and to Greece in the final of the contest.

==== Points awarded to Bulgaria ====
Points awarded to Bulgaria (Semi-final 1)
Score	Country
12 points	
10 points	
8 points	
7 points	
6 points	
5 points	Macedonia
4 points	
3 points	
2 points	Turkey
1 point	

==== Points awarded by Bulgaria ====
Points awarded by Bulgaria (Semi-final 1)
Score	Country
12 points	Turkey
10 points	Macedonia
8 points	Armenia
7 points	Bosnia and Herzegovina
6 points	Iceland
5 points	Romania
4 points	Israel
3 points	Malta
2 points	Portugal
1 point	Belarus

Points awarded by Bulgaria (Final)
Score	Country
12 points	Greece
10 points	Turkey
8 points	Azerbaijan
7 points	United Kingdom
6 points	Armenia
5 points	Iceland
4 points	Bosnia and Herzegovina
3 points	Finland
2 points	Norway
1 point	Lithuania

==== Detailed voting results ====
Detailed voting results from Bulgaria (Final)
R/O	Country	Results			Points
R/O	Country	Jury	Televoting	Combined	Points
01	Lithuania	6		6	1
02	Israel				
03	France				
04	Sweden				
05	Croatia	2		2	
06	Portugal				
07	Iceland	8		8	5
08	Greece	12	10	22	12
09	Armenia		8	8	6
10	Russia		5	5	
11	Azerbaijan	4	7	11	8
12	Bosnia and Herzegovina	3	4	7	4
13	Moldova		3	3	
14	Malta				
15	Estonia				
16	Denmark	5		5	
17	Germany				
18	Turkey	1	12	13	10
19	Albania				
20	Norway		6	6	2
21	Ukraine				
22	Romania		2	2	
23	United Kingdom	10	1	11	7
24	Finland	7		7	3
25	Spain				
