= Israel in the Eurovision Song Contest 2009 =

- Eurovision Song Contest 2009
- Participating broadcaster: Israel Broadcasting Authority (IBA)
- Country: Israel
- Selection process: Artist: Internal selection Song: Kdam Eurovision 2009
- Selection date: Artist: 11 January 2009; Song: 2 March 2009

Competing entry
- Song: "There Must Be Another Way"
- Artist: Noa and Mira Awad
- Songwriters: Achinoam Nini; Mira Awad; Gil Dor

Placement
- Semi-final result: Qualified (7th, 75 points)
- Final result: 16th, 53 points

Participation chronology

Israel was represented at the Eurovision Song Contest 2009 with the song "There Must Be Another Way", written by Noa, Mira Awad, and Gil Dor, and performed by Noa and Mira Awad. The Israeli participating broadcaster, the Israel Broadcasting Authority (IBA), selected its entry through the national final Kdam Eurovision 2009, after having previously selected the performers internally in January 2009. The national final took place on 2 March 2009 and featured four songs. "Einaiych (There Must Be Another Way)" emerged as the winning song after achieving the highest score following the combination of votes from two regional juries, a jury panel and a public vote.

Israel was drawn to compete in the first semi-final of the Eurovision Song Contest which took place on 12 May 2009. Performing during the show in position 10, "There Must Be Another Way" was announced among the top 10 entries of the first semi-final and therefore qualified to compete in the final on 16 May. It was later revealed that Israel placed seventh out of the 18 participating countries in the semi-final with 75 points. In the final, Israel performed in position 2 and placed sixteenth out of the 25 participating countries, scoring 53 points.

== Background ==
Prior to the 2009 contest, the Israel Broadcasting Authority (IBA) had participated in the Eurovision Song Contest representing Israel thirty-one times since its first entry in 1973. It has won the contest on three occasions: in 1978 with the song "A-Ba-Ni-Bi" by Izhar Cohen and the Alphabeta, in 1979 with the song "Hallelujah" by Milk and Honey, and in 1998 with the song "Diva" by Dana International. Since the introduction of semi-finals to the format of the Eurovision Song Contest in 2004, Israel has, to this point, managed to qualify to the final three times, including two top ten results in 2005 with "HaSheket SheNish'ar" by Shiri Maimon placing fourth, and in 2008 with "The Fire In Your Eyes" by Boaz placing ninth.

As part of its duties as participating broadcaster, IBA organises the selection of its entry in the Eurovision Song Contest and broadcasts the event in the country. The broadcaster confirmed its participation in the 2009 contest on 3 November 2008. In 2007 and 2008, IBA conducted an internal selection to select the artist and a national final to select the song, a selection procedure that continued for its 2009 entry. The national final was produced entirely by IBA after commercial broadcaster Keshet had turned down a collaboration proposal citing financial reasons.

== Before Eurovision ==
=== Artist selection ===
On 11 January 2009, IBA announced that Achinoam Nini, under the artistic name Noa, and Mira Awad were selected as its representatives for the Eurovision Song Contest 2009. This was the first time an Israeli Arab singer had been selected to represent Israel at the Eurovision Song Contest. A professional committee with members from IBA considered several artists, of which Harel Skaat, Marina Maximillian Blumin and Maya Bouskilla were invited to participate before Noa and Awad were ultimately selected. Negotiations with Skaat broke down due to a legal dispute with his former record label Hed Arzi Music which forbade him from recording any new material, while Blumin and Bouskilla had turned down the offer to represent Israel due to issues with their current military services in the Israeli army. The members of the committee were Yoav Ginai (entertainment director of IBA), Noam Gil-Or (director of Reshet Gimmel), Izchak Sonnenschein (Head of Israeli Eurovision delegation), Yuval Ganor (director of 88FM) and Galya Giladi (music editor and presenter at 88FM). It was also announced that a national final titled Kdam Eurovision 2009 featuring four songs would take place to select their song.

=== Kdam Eurovision 2009 ===
Kdam Eurovision 2009 logo

Four songs, all written by Noa, Mira Awad, and Gil Dor and performed in English, Hebrew, and Arabic, were provided by the performers for the competition "with the goal of using Eurovision as a means to convey a message of peace in these difficult times", as stated by Noa in regards to the competing songs. Prior to the final, the songs were presented on 24 February 2009 during a special presentation programme broadcast via radio on Reshet Gimmel, hosted by Avi Etgar.

==== Final ====
The final took place on 2 March 2009 at the Nakdi TV Studios in Jerusalem, hosted by Eden Harel and broadcast on Channel 1 as well as online via IBA's official Eurovision Song Contest website Eurovil. The show was also broadcast via radio in Hebrew on Reshet Gimmel and in Arabic on Reshet Dalet. All four competing songs were performed by Noa and Mira Awad and the winning song, "Einaiych (There Must Be Another Way)", was selected by a combination of the votes from four voting groups: two regional juries (30%), an expert jury of IBA representatives (30%) and a public vote (40%). The public vote that took place during the show was conducted through telephone and SMS. The singers described "There Must Be Another Way" not as a song of peace, but as a song that emphasises hope and understanding through common humanity and a call to respect the humanity of others.

Final – 2 March 2009
R/O	Song		Jury	Televote	Total	Place
R/O	Hebrew title	English title	Jury	Televote	Total	Place
1	"Kol Shniya" (כל שנייה)	"Second Chance"	24	8	32	4
2	"Na'amin Bachalom" (נאמין בחלום)	"Faith in the Light"	48	24	72	3
3	"Bo'i Lirkod Iti" (בואי לרקוד איתי)	"Will You Dance with Me"	36	48	84	2
4	"Einaiych" (עינייך)	"There Must Be Another Way"	72	40	112	1

Detailed jury votes
R/O	Song	Kiryat Shmona	Be'er Sheva	Expert jury	Total
1	"Kol Shniya"	9	9	6	24
2	"Na'amin Bachalom"	15	15	18	48
3	"Bo'i Lirkod Iti"	3	3	30	36
4	"Einaiych"	18	18	36	72

=== Controversy ===
There was some controversy about the duo performing together for Eurovision. Several Jewish and Arab artists and intellectuals called for Awad to step down because, in their view, her participation would convey a false impression of national coexistence that would be used to cover up the deaths of Palestinian civilians in the Gaza Strip during the 2008–2009 Gaza War. In an interview on NPR, Awad acknowledged the criticism and said, "We're not naïve enough to think that we're representing any existing situation. We are trying to show a possible situation that we believe is possible if we just make the necessary efforts."

== At Eurovision ==
According to Eurovision rules, all nations with the exceptions of the host country and the "Big Four" (France, Germany, Spain and the United Kingdom) are required to qualify from one of two semi-finals in order to compete for the final; the top nine songs from each semi-final as determined by televoting progress to the final, and a tenth was determined by back-up juries. The European Broadcasting Union (EBU) split up the competing countries into six different pots based on voting patterns from previous contests, with countries with favourable voting histories put into the same pot. On 30 January 2009, a special allocation draw was held which placed each country into one of the two semi-finals. Israel was placed into the first semi-final, to be held on 12 May 2009. The running order for the semi-finals was decided through another draw on 16 March 2009 and Israel was set to perform in position 10, following the entry from Turkey and before the entry from Bulgaria.

IBA televised live the two semi-finals and the final in Israel. IBA appointed Ofer Nachshon as its spokesperson to announce the Israeli votes during the final.

=== Semi-final ===
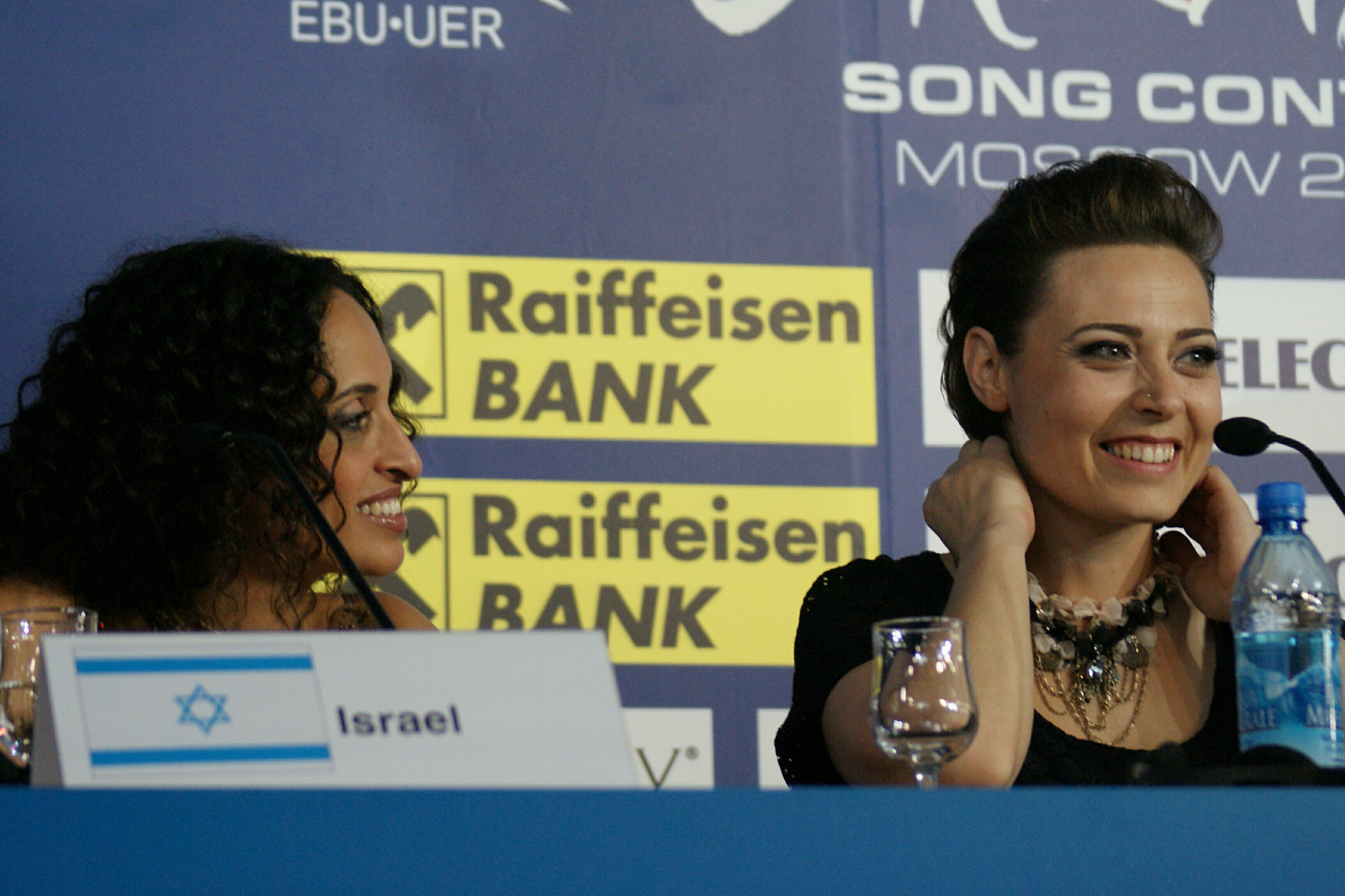
Noa and Mira Awad during the first semi-final winners' press conference

Noa and Mira Awad took part in technical rehearsals on 4 and 7 May, followed by dress rehearsals on 11 and 12 May. This included the jury show on 11 May where the professional juries of each country watched and voted on the competing entries.

The Israeli performance featured Noa and Mira Awad both performing in black dresses and boots together with a tin drummer, a guitarist and a tambourine and cymbal player. The performance began with Noa and Awad standing on opposite sides of the stage performing the song acapella. The musicians joined Noa and Awad during the performance and formed a round, after which the singers left to play the drums together and concluded the performance by holding hands. The stage was set in dark blue colors with the LED screens displaying a big orange rose at the end of the performance. Among the three musicians performing on stage with Noa and Awad was the co-composer of "There Must Be Another Way" Gil Dor.

At the end of the show, Israel was announced as having finished in the top 10 and subsequently qualifying for the grand final. It was later revealed that Israel placed seventh in the semi-final, receiving a total of 75 points.

=== Final ===
Shortly after the first semi-final, a winners' press conference was held for the ten qualifying countries. As part of this press conference, the qualifying artists took part in a draw to determine the running order of the final. This draw was done in the order the countries appeared in the semi-final running order. Israel was drawn to perform in position 2, following the entry from Lithuania and before the entry from France.

Noa and Mira Awad once again took part in dress rehearsals on 15 and 16 May before the final, including the jury final where the professional juries cast their final votes before the live show. Noa and Mira Awad performed a repeat of his semi-final performance during the final on 16 May. Israel placed sixteenth in the final, scoring 53 points.

=== Voting ===
The voting system for 2009 involved each country awarding points from 1-8, 10 and 12, with the points in the final being decided by a combination of 50% national jury and 50% televoting. Each participating broadcaster assembled a jury panel of five music industry professionals who were citizens of the country they represented. This jury judged each entry based on: vocal capacity; the stage performance; the song's composition and originality; and the overall impression by the act. In addition, no member of a national jury was permitted to be related in any way to any of the competing acts in such a way that they cannot vote impartially and independently.

Following the release of the full split voting by the EBU after the conclusion of the competition, it was revealed that Israel had placed twenty-fifth (last) with the public televote and ninth with the jury vote in the final. In the public vote, Israel scored 15 points, while with the jury vote, Israel scored 107 points.

Below is a breakdown of points awarded to Israel and awarded by Israel in the second semi-final and grand final of the contest. The nation awarded its 12 points to Iceland in the semi-final and to Norway in the final of the contest.

==== Points awarded to Israel ====
Points awarded to Israel (Semi-final 1)
Score	Country
12 points	
10 points	
8 points	Andorra
7 points	Armenia
6 points	Finland; Iceland; Sweden
5 points	Germany; Montenegro; Switzerland
4 points	Belarus; Bulgaria; Czech Republic; Malta
3 points	Belgium; Romania; Turkey
2 points	
1 point	Macedonia; United Kingdom

Points awarded to Israel (Final)
Score	Country
12 points	
10 points	France
8 points	Belgium; Bosnia and Herzegovina
7 points	Andorra
6 points	
5 points	Estonia; Slovakia
4 points	Czech Republic; Montenegro
3 points	
2 points	
1 point	Switzerland; Ukraine

==== Points awarded by Israel ====
Points awarded by Israel (Semi-final 1)
Score	Country
12 points	Iceland
10 points	Armenia
8 points	Romania
7 points	Sweden
6 points	Turkey
5 points	Malta
4 points	Belarus
3 points	Bosnia and Herzegovina
2 points	Portugal
1 point	Montenegro

Points awarded by Israel (Final)
Score	Country
12 points	Norway
10 points	Iceland
8 points	Armenia
7 points	Russia
6 points	Azerbaijan
5 points	France
4 points	United Kingdom
3 points	Turkey
2 points	Ukraine
1 point	Moldova

==== Detailed voting results ====
The following members comprised the Israeli jury:

- Moshe Morad – music editor, IBA radio presenter
- Haya Zell – IBA musical archive manager
- Nurit Bat Shahar Zafrir – lyricist
- Tahel Zimmerman – musician
- Itamar Barak – journalist

Detailed voting results from Israel (Final)
R/O	Country	Results			Points
R/O	Country	Jury	Televoting	Combined	Points
01	Lithuania				
02	Israel				
03	France	8		8	5
04	Sweden				
05	Croatia	3		3	
06	Portugal				
07	Iceland	12	7	19	10
08	Greece				
09	Armenia	6	5	11	8
10	Russia		10	10	7
11	Azerbaijan		8	8	6
12	Bosnia and Herzegovina	1		1	
13	Moldova	4	1	5	1
14	Malta	2		2	
15	Estonia		4	4	
16	Denmark				
17	Germany				
18	Turkey	7		7	3
19	Albania				
20	Norway	10	12	22	12
21	Ukraine		6	6	2
22	Romania		3	3	
23	United Kingdom	5	2	7	4
24	Finland				
25	Spain				
