= Albania in the Eurovision Song Contest 2009 =

- Eurovision Song Contest 2009
- Participating broadcaster: Radio Televizioni Shqiptar (RTSH)
- Country: Albania
- Selection process: Festivali i Këngës 47
- Selection date: 21 December 2008

Competing entry
- Song: "Carry Me in Your Dreams"
- Artist: Kejsi Tola
- Songwriters: Edmond Zhulali; Agim Doçi

Placement
- Semi-final result: Qualified (7th, 73 points)
- Final result: 17th, 48 points

Participation chronology

Albania was represented at the Eurovision Song Contest 2009 with the song "Carry Me in Your Dreams", written by Edmond Zhulali and Agim Doçi, and performed by Kejsi Tola. The Albanian participating broadcaster, Radio Televizioni Shqiptar (RTSH), selected its entry through the national selection competition Festivali i Këngës in late December 2008.

Albania was drawn to compete in the second semi-final of the contest, which took place on 14 May 2009. Performing as number 16, the nation was announced among the top 10 entries of the second semi-final and therefore qualified to compete in the final. In the 16 May final, it performed as number 19 and placed 17th out of the 25 participating countries, scoring 48 points.

== Background ==
Prior to the 2009 contest, Radio Televizioni Shqiptar (RTSH) had participated in the Eurovision Song Contest representing Albania five times since its first entry in 2004. Its highest placing in the contest, to this point, had been the seventh place, achieved in 2004 with the song "The Image of You" performed by Anjeza Shahini.

As part of its duties as participating broadcaster, RTSH organises the selection of its entry in the Eurovision Song Contest and broadcasts the event in the country. RTSH has organised Festivali i Këngës since its inauguration in 1962. Since 2003, the winner of the competition has simultaneously won the right to represent Albania in the Eurovision Song Contest.

== Before Eurovision ==
=== Festivali i Këngës ===
RTSH organised the 47th edition of Festivali i Këngës to determine Albania's representative for the Eurovision Song Contest 2009. The competition consisted of two semi-finals on 19 and 20 December, respectively, and the grand final on 21 December 2008. The three live shows were hosted by Albanian singer Elsa Lila, composer Julian Deda and actor Gentian Zenelaj.

==== Competing entries ====
Competing entries
Artist(s)	Song	Songwriter(s)
Adelina Thaçi	"Oret e fundit"	Alfred Kaçinari
Agim Poshka	"Fajtor për ngrohjen globale"	Agim Poshka; Olsen Maze
Besa Kokëdhima	"Ajer"	Alban Male; Olti Curri
Burn	"Jam i pari i jettes sime"	Stivart Cela; Renis Gjoka; Big Basta
Dorina Garuci	"Dite një jetë"	Dorian Nini; Pandi Laço
Emi Bogdo	"Kur buzet henen e kafshojn"	Emi Bogdo; Klodian Qafoku
Endri and Stefi Prifti	"Ti bere faj"	Josif Minga; Skender Rusi
Era Rusi	"Shpirt i humbur"	Arsen Nasi; Bledar Skenderi; Irma Libohova
Erga Halilaj	"Dikush mungon"	Kristi Popa; Florion Zyko
Evis Mula	"Unë jam dashuria"	Luan Zhegu; Agim Doçi
Julian Lekoçaj	"Nuk je ti"	Julian Lekoçaj
Juliana Pasha and Luiz Ejlli	"Nje jetë"	Shpetim Saraçi; Turian Hyskaj
Kejsi Tola	"Më merr në ëndërr"	Edmond Zhulali; Agim Doçi
Kujtim Prodani	"Nostalgji"	Kujtim Prodani; Agim Doçi
Marjeta Billo	"Era e tokës"	Adrian Hila; Pandi Laço
Rovena Dilo and Eugent Bushpepa	"S'jam balade"	Armend Rexhepagiqi
Shpat Kasapi	"Aromë mediterane"	Gent Myftarai; Pandi Laço
Soni Malaj	"Zona zero"	Flori Mumajesi
Vedat Ademi	"Po me prite ti"	Kledi Bahiti; Alban Male
West Side Family	"Jehonë"	Dr. Flori

==== Shows ====
===== Semi-finals =====
The semi-finals of Festivali i Këngës took place on 19 December and 20 December 2008, and were broadcast live at 20.45 (CET) on the respective dates. The first semi-final featured all 20 artists performing their entries, while in the second one each artist performed a duet with an other Albanian artist.

Semi-final 1 – 19 December 2008
R/O	Artist(s)	Song
1	Dorina Garuci	"Dite një jetë"
2	Endri and Stefi Prifti	"Ti bere faj"
3	Evis Mula	"Unë jam dashuria"
4	Juliana Pasha and Luiz Ejlli	"Nje jetë"
5	West Side Family	"Jehonë"
6	Shpat Kasapi	"Aromë mediterane"
7	Kejsi Tola	"Më merr në ëndërr"
8	Marjeta Billo	"Era e tokës"
9	Rovena Dilo and Eugent Bushpepa	"S'jam balade"
10	Agim Poshka	"Fajtor për ngrohjen globale"
11	Julian Lekoçaj	"Nuk je ti"
12	Burn	"Jam i pari i jettes sime"
13	Erga Halilaj	"Dikush mungon"
14	Emi Bogdo	"Kur buzet henen e kafshojn"
15	Kujtim Prodani	"Nostalgji"
16	Adelina Thaçi	"Oret e fundit"
17	Era Rusi	"Shpirt i humbur"
18	Vedat Ademi	"Po me prite ti"
19	Besa Kokëdhima	"Ajer"
20	Soni Malaj	"Zona zero"

Semi-final 2 – 20 December 2008
R/O	Artist(s)	Song
1	Marjeta Billo and Olta Boka	"Era e tokës"
2	Besa Kokëdhima and Jacky Dachum	"Ajer"
3	Shpat Kasapi and Adelina Tahiri	"Aromë mediterane"
4	Emi Bogdo and Xhoi	"Kur buzet henen e kafshojn"
5	Evis Mula and Erti Hizmo	"Unë jam dashuria"
6	Era Rusi and Irma Libohova	"Shpirt i humbur"
7	Rovena Dilo, Eugent Bushpepa and Jonida Maliqi	"S'jam balade"
8	Endri, Stefi and Maria Prifti	"Ti bere faj"
9	Juliana Pasha, Luiz Ejlli and Produkt 28	"Nje jetë"
10	Erga Halilaj and Kristi Popa	"Dikush mungon"
11	Kejsi Tola and Flaka Krelani	"Më merr në ëndërr"
12	Kujtim Prodani and Jo Artid Fejzo	"Nostalgji"
13	Dorina Garuci, Arber Arapi and Marsida Saraci	"Dite një jetë"
14	Burn and Aleksander Gjoka	"Jam i pari i jettes sime"
15	Agim Poshka and Eranda Libohova	"Fajtor për ngrohjen globale"
16	West Side Family and Aurela Gaçe	"Jehonë"
17	Adelina Thaçi and Teuta Kurti	"Oret e fundit"
18	Vedat Ademi and Samanta Karavello	"Po me prite ti"
19	Julian Lekoçaj and Kamela Islamaj	"Nuk je ti"
20	Soni Malaj and Getoar Selimi	"Zona zero"

===== Final =====
The grand final of Festivali i Këngës took place on 21 December 2008 and was broadcast live at 20.45 (CET). The winner was determined by the combination of the votes from a seven-member jury, consisting of E. Koço, G. Bojaxhi, F. Boshnjaku, G. Demaliaj, N. Çashku, M. Laze and L. Leopoldi. Kejsi Tola emerged as the winner with "Më merr në ëndërr" and was simultaneously announced as Albania's representative for the Eurovision Song Contest 2009.

Final – 21 December 2008
R/O	Artist(s)	Song	Points	Result
1	West Side Family	"Jehonë"	118	3
2	Soni Malaj	"Zona zero"	44	16
3	Juliana Pasha and Luiz Ejlli	"Nje jetë"	119	2
4	Kujtim Prodani	"Nostalgji"	24	18
5	Emi Bogdo	"Kur buzet henen e kafshojn"	43	17
6	Erga Halilaj	"Dikush mungon"	63	11
7	Marjeta Billo	"Era e tokës"	106	5
8	Adelina Thaçi	"Oret e fundit"	91	8
9	Rovena Dilo and Eugent Bushpepa	"S'jam balade"	60	12
10	Dorina Garuci	"Dite një jetë"	92	7
11	Endri and Stefi Prifti	"Ti bere faj"	91	8
12	Kejsi Tola	"Më merr në ëndërr"	126	1
13	Era Rusi	"Shpirt i humbur"	50	15
14	Julian Lekoçaj	"Nuk je ti"	17	20
15	Shpat Kasapi	"Aromë mediterane"	22	19
16	Evis Mula	"Unë jam dashuria"	91	8
17	Burn	"Jam i pari i jettes sime"	96	6
18	Vedat Ademi	"Po me prite ti"	51	14
19	Agim Poshka	"Fajtor për ngrohjen globale"	56	13
20	Besa Kokëdhima	"Ajer"	109	4

== At Eurovision ==
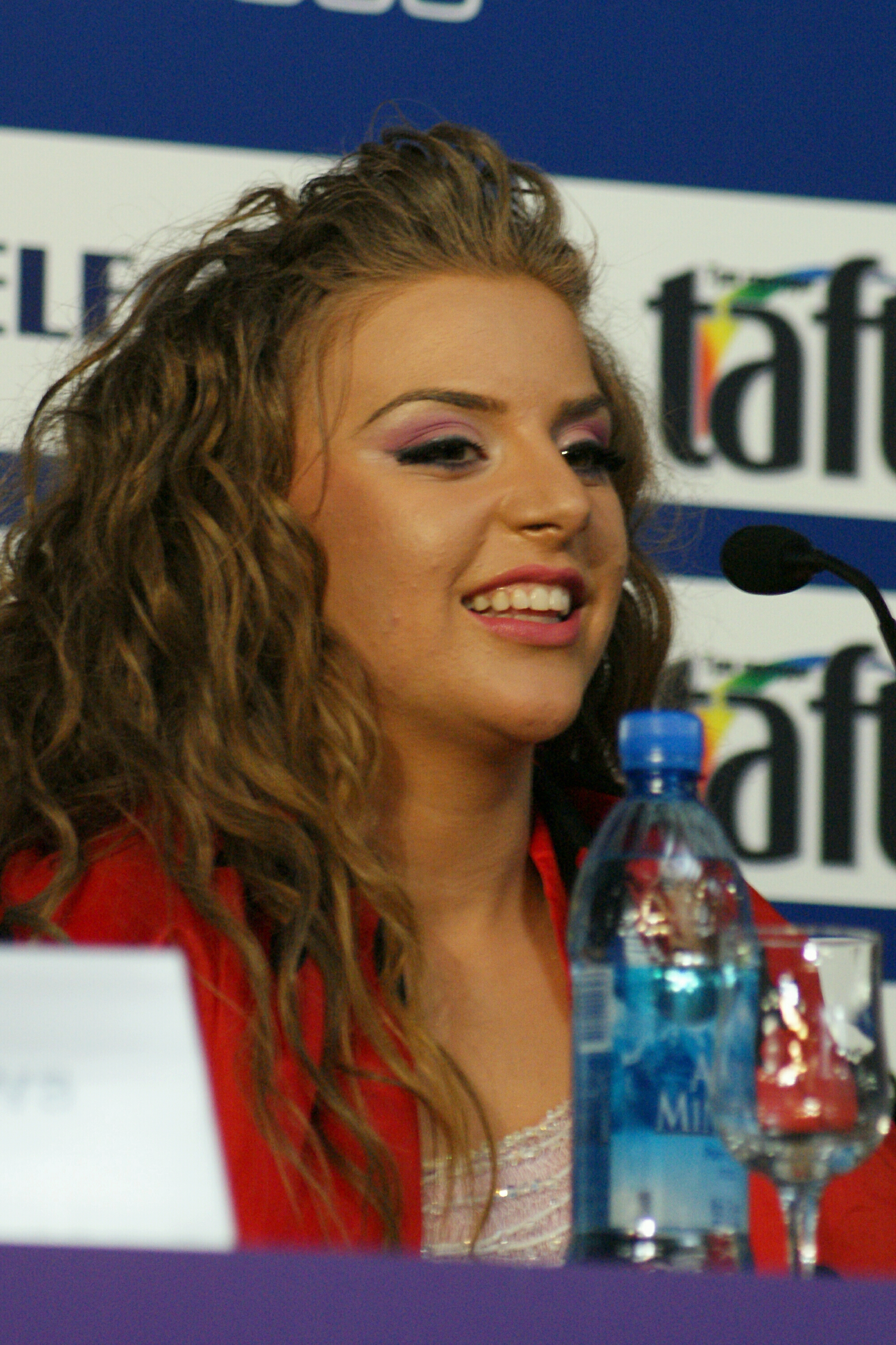
Kejsi Tola at a press conference of the Eurovision Song Contest 2009.

The Eurovision Song Contest 2009 took place at the Olympic Stadium in Moscow, Russia and consisted of two semi-finals held on 12 and 14 May, respectively, and the grand final on 16 May 2009. According to the Eurovision rules, all participating countries, except the host nation and the "Big Four", consisting of France, Germany, Spain and the United Kingdom, were required to qualify from one of the two semi-finals to compete for the grand final, although the top 10 countries from the respective semi-final progress to the grand final of the contest.

On 30 January 2009, a special allocation draw was held that placed each country into one of the two semi-finals, with Albania being placed into the second, to be held on 14 May. Once all the competing songs for the Eurovision Song Contest 2009 had been released, the running order for the semi-finals was decided by the delegation heads of the 42 participating countries rather than through another draw; the nation was set to perform at position 16, following Moldova and preceding Ukraine. In the grand final, it was announced that Albania would be performing 19th, following Turkey and preceding Norway.

=== Voting ===
The tables below visualise a breakdown of points awarded to Albania in the second semi-final and grand final of the Eurovision Song Contest 2009, as well as by the nation on both occasions. In the semi-final, Albania finished in seventh place with a total of 73 points, including 10 from both Croatia and Greece. In the grand final, Albania finished in 17th place, being awarded a total of 48 points, including 10 from Turkey and 7 from Greece, Macedonia and Montenegro. The nation awarded its 12 points to Greece in both the semi-final and final of the contest.

==== Points awarded to Albania ====
Points awarded to Albania (Semi-final 2)
Score	Country
12 points	
10 points	Croatia; Greece
8 points	
7 points	Slovenia
6 points	Denmark; Poland
5 points	Azerbaijan; France; Moldova; Norway
4 points	Hungary; Slovakia
3 points	Ukraine
2 points	Russia
1 point	Netherlands

Points awarded to Albania (Final)
Score	Country
12 points	
10 points	Turkey
8 points	
7 points	Greece; Macedonia; Montenegro
6 points	Switzerland
5 points	Croatia
4 points	
3 points	
2 points	Hungary; Slovenia
1 point	Estonia; Sweden

==== Points awarded by Albania ====
Points awarded by Albania (Semi-final 2)
Score	Country
12 points	Greece
10 points	Netherlands
8 points	Norway
7 points	Ireland
6 points	Poland
5 points	Denmark
4 points	Slovakia
3 points	Hungary
2 points	Slovenia
1 point	Croatia

Points awarded by Albania (Final)
Score	Country
12 points	Greece
10 points	Turkey
8 points	United Kingdom
7 points	Norway
6 points	Iceland
5 points	Bosnia and Herzegovina
4 points	Azerbaijan
3 points	Germany
2 points	France
1 point	Sweden

==== Detailed voting results ====
Detailed voting results from Albania (Final)
R/O	Country	Results			Points
R/O	Country	Jury	Televoting	Combined	Points
01	Lithuania				
02	Israel		1	1	
03	France	3	3	6	2
04	Sweden		4	4	1
05	Croatia	4		4	
06	Portugal				
07	Iceland	6	2	8	6
08	Greece	10	10	20	12
09	Armenia				
10	Russia				
11	Azerbaijan		7	7	4
12	Bosnia and Herzegovina	8		8	5
13	Moldova				
14	Malta	1		1	
15	Estonia				
16	Denmark				
17	Germany		6	6	3
18	Turkey	7	12	19	10
19	Albania				
20	Norway	5	8	13	7
21	Ukraine				
22	Romania				
23	United Kingdom	12	5	17	8
24	Finland				
25	Spain	2		2	
