= Shpat Kasapi =

Albanian singer-songwriter (1985–2025)

Background information
- Born: 1 May 1985; Tetovo, SR Macedonia, SFR Yugoslavia
- Died: 25 November 2025 (aged 40) Bologna, Italy
- Genres: Pop, Rock, R&B, Dance
- Occupation: Singer
- Instrument: Vocals
- Years active: 2000–2025

Shpat Kasapi (1 May 1985 – 26 November 2025) was an Albanian singer-songwriter.

== Life and career ==
Kasapi was born on 1 May 1985 into an Albanian family in the city of Tetovo, then part of SFR Yugoslavia, present North Macedonia.

He participated in both Festivali i Kënges 43 and 47 for the chance to represent Albania at the Eurovision Song Contest 2005 and Eurovision Song Contest 2009 respectively. He was in relationships with Miss Universe Kosovo 2011, Afërdita Dreshaj and Qendresa Dulaj.

Kasapi died of cardiac arrest on 26 November 2025, at the age of 40, in Monza, Italy, where he had traveled for family reasons.
