= Portugal in the Eurovision Song Contest 2009 =

- Eurovision Song Contest 2009
- Participating broadcaster: Rádio e Televisão de Portugal (RTP)
- Country: Portugal
- Selection process: Festival da Canção 2009
- Selection date: 28 February 2009

Competing entry
- Song: "Todas as ruas do amor"
- Artist: Flor-de-Lis
- Songwriters: Pedro Marques; Paulo Pereira

Placement
- Semi-final result: Qualified (8th, 70 points)
- Final result: 15th, 57 points

Participation chronology

Portugal was represented at the Eurovision Song Contest 2009 with the song "Todas as ruas do amor", written by Pedro Marques and Paulo Pereira, and performed by the group Flor-de-Lis. The Portuguese participating broadcaster, Rádio e Televisão de Portugal (RTP), organised the national final Festival da Canção 2009 in order to select its entry for the contest. The competition took place on 28 February 2009 where "Todas as ruas do amor" performed by Flor-de-Lis emerged as the winner after achieving the highest score following the combination of votes from twenty regional juries and a public televote.

Portugal was drawn to compete in the first semi-final of the Eurovision Song Contest which took place on 12 May 2009. Performing during the show in position 16, "Todas as ruas do amor" was announced among the 10 qualifying entries of the first semi-final and therefore qualified to compete in the final on 16 May. It was later revealed that Portugal placed eighth out of the 18 participating countries in the semi-final with 70 points. In the final, Portugal performed in position 6 and placed fifteenth out of the 25 participating countries with 57 points.

== Background ==
Prior to the 2009 contest, Radiotelevisão Portuguesa (RTP) until 2003, and Rádio e Televisão de Portugal (RTP) since 2004, had participated in the Eurovision Song Contest representing Portugal forty-two times since its first entry in 1964. Their highest placing in the contest was sixth, achieved in 1996 with the song "O meu coração não tem cor" performed by Lúcia Moniz. Following the introduction of semi-finals for the 2004 contest, Portugal had featured in only one final. Their least successful result has been last place, which they have achieved on three occasions, most recently in 1997 with the song "Antes do adeus" performed by Célia Lawson. Portugal has also received nul points on two occasions; in 1964 and 1997. They qualified to the final in 2008 for the first time and placed thirteenth with the song "Senhora do mar (Negras águas)" performed by Vânia Fernandes.

As part of its duties as participating broadcaster, RTP organises the selection of its entry in the Eurovision Song Contest and broadcasts the event in the country. The broadcaster confirmed its participation in the 2009 contest on 20 October 2008. RTP has traditionally selected its entry for the contest via the music competition Festival da Canção, with exceptions in 1988 and in 2005 when the entries were internally selected. Along with its participation confirmation, the broadcaster revealed details regarding its selection procedure and announced the organization of Festival da Canção 2009 in order to select its 2009 entry.

== Before Eurovision ==
=== Festival da Canção 2009 ===
The logo of Festival da Canção 2009

Festival da Canção 2009 was the 45th edition of Festival da Canção organised by RTP to select its entry for the Eurovision Song Contest 2009. Twelve entries competed in the competition which took place on 28 February 2009 at the Teatro Camões in Lisbon. The show was hosted by Sílvia Alberto and broadcast on RTP1, RTP África, and RTP Internacional as well as online via the broadcaster's official website rtp.pt.

==== Competing entries ====
Artists and composers that possessed Portuguese citizenship were able to submit their entries for the competition between 2 December 2008 and 12 January 2009. Songs were required to be submitted in Portuguese. A jury panel consisting of Head of Delegation for Portugal at the Eurovision Song Contest José Poiares, singer-songwriter Tozé Brito, and music producers Fernando Martins and Ramón Galarza selected twenty-four entries for an online vote from 393 submissions received, which were revealed on 19 January 2010. Among the competing artists were former Eurovision Song Contest entrants Armando Gama, who represented Portugal in 1983, Nucha, who represented Portugal in 1990, and Luciana Abreu, who represented Portugal in 2005 as part of the duo 2B.

The twenty-four competing entries were released online via rtp.pt on 19 January 2009 and users were able to vote for their favourite songs each day until 30 January 2009. On 28 January 2009, the song "Não está" performed by Miguel Cervini was withdrawn from the competition due to the artist's disagreements with the online voting process. 117,639 valid votes were received at the conclusion of the voting period and the top twelve entries that advanced to the final were revealed on 31 January 2009. On 4 February 2009, "Sinto sentido" performed by Pedro Duvalle, which placed eleventh in the online vote, was disqualified due to the song having been performed prior to the competition and replaced with the song "Lua sem luar" performed by Nuno Norte, which placed thirteenth in the voting.

Results of the online vote – 19–30 January 2009
R/O	Artist	Song	Songwriter(s)	Votes	Place
1	Lyana	"Vivo para a paz (Peace)"	Liliana Pinheiro	1,061	21
2	Nucha	"Tudo está na tua mão"	Ivan Prim, Nucha	7,000	8
3	Flor-de-Lis	"Todas as ruas do amor"	Pedro Marques, Paulo Pereira	7,024	7
4	Tayti	"Amore mio, amore mio"	José Félix	5,705	12
5	Pedro Daniel	"Sem ti não quero acordar"	Jorge do Carmo, Nikita	2,774	15
6	~~Pedro Duvalle~~	~~"Sinto sentido"~~	~~Pedro Duvalle~~	~~5,873~~	~~11~~
7	Romana	"Acordem olhos doirados"	Romana, Rodrigo Serrão	7,087	6
8	Angie	"Sonhar sem limites"	Guido Craveiro, Sérgio Oliveira	3,073	14
9	Nuno and Fábia	"Não demores (quero-te aquecer)"	Pedro Vaz	10,420	2
10	Infantes de Sagres	"O beijo de quando te vais embora"	Miguel Castro	2,634	16
11	Fernando Pereira	"É o amor"	Lucas Jr., Fernando Pereira	6,321	10
12	Luciana Abreu	"Juntos vamos conseguir (Yes We Can)"	Carlos Coincas, Luciana Abreu	11,193	1
13	Sérgio Lucas	"Procuro-me em mim"	António Loureiro, Sérgio Lucas	2,108	17
14	Eva Danin	"Amor mais forte que o vento"	Rui Videira	10,015	3
15	Jackpot	"Há sempre um mas"	Jackpot	1,926	18
16	~~Miguel Cervini~~	~~"Não está"~~	~~Miguel Cervini~~	—	—
17	Francisco Andrade	"Voar é ver"	Carlos Massa, Fernando Abrantes	6,782	9
18	Armando Gama	"Amor mais-que-perfeito"	Armando Gama	336	23
19	Ana Sofia	"O meu planeta especial"	Tó Sanches	809	22
20	André Rodrigues	"Não vou voltar a mim"	André Rodrigues	8,869	4
21	Nuno Norte	"Lua sem luar"	Paulo Abreu de Lima	5,527	13
22	Filipa Batista	"O teu lugar"	Augusto Madureira	7,911	5
23	Flávio	"Jura que ainda me amas"	Jorge do Carmo, Tó Andrade	1,856	19
24	Daniel Costa	"Mais uma vez (este mar salgado)"	Daniel Costa	1,335	20

==== Final ====
The final took place on 28 February 2009. Twelve entries competed and the winner, "Todas as ruas do amor" performed by Flor-de-Lis, was selected based on the 50/50 combination of votes of twenty regional juries and a public televote. In addition to the performances of the competing entries, Hip Hop BCM and Teresa Radamanto performed as the interval acts.

Final – 28 February 2009
R/O	Artist	Song	Jury		Televote		Total	Place
R/O	Artist	Song	Votes	Points	Percentage	Points	Total	Place
1	Nucha	"Tudo está na tua mão"	78	3	2%	1	4	9
2	Romana	"Acordem olhos doirados"	124	6	3%	2	8	7
3	Filipa Batista	"O teu lugar"	130	7	6%	5	12	5
4	André Rodrigues	"Não vou voltar a mim"	31	1	2%	0	1	11
5	Luciana Abreu	"Juntos vamos conseguir (Yes We Can)"	107	4	28%	12	16	3
6	Nuno Norte	"Lua sem luar"	143	8	5%	4	12	4
7	Tayti	"Amore mio, amore mio"	21	0	4%	3	3	10
8	Fernando Pereira	"É o amor"	15	0	2%	0	0	12
9	Eva Danin	"Amar mais forte que o vento"	109	5	7%	7	12	6
10	Francisco Andrade	"Voar é ver"	145	10	9%	8	18	2
11	Flor-de-Lis	"Todas as ruas do amor"	217	12	25%	10	22	1
12	Nuno and Fábia	"Não demores (quero-te aquecer)"	40	2	7%	6	8	8

Detailed Regional Jury Votes
R/O	Song	Aveiro	Beja	Braga	Bragança	Castelo Branco	Coimbra	Évora	Faro	Madeira	Guarda	Leiria	Lisbon	Azores	Portalegre	Porto	Santarém	Setúbal	Viana do Castelo	Vila Real	Viseu	Total
1	"Tudo está na tua mão"	8	1	6	2	2	6	4	4		5	5	7	5	2	3	4	4	5	3	2	78
2	"Acordem olhos doirados"	10	12	8	7	6	4	6	5	6	6	10	2	8	3	10	10	5	4	5	3	124
3	"O teu lugar"	6	3	2	3	5	8	7	10	10	8	4	1	10	7	6	7	6	8	6	7	130
4	"Não vou voltar a mim"					3	1	1		4	3	2	5	1		4			2	1	5	31
5	"Juntos vamos conseguir (Yes We Can)"	5	6	10	1	4	3	5	3	5	7	6	3	4	8	1	12	8	3	7	6	107
6	"Lua sem luar"	4	5	5	5	8	10	10	8	7	4	8	10	6	5	5	8	2	10	8	12	143
7	"Amore mio, amore mio"			3			2	2	1											2		21
8	"É o amor"	1		1	4	1				3				1			3	3		4		15
9	"Amar mais forte que o vento"	3	4	4	6	10	5	3	6	1	12		6	2	6	7	2	12	6	10	1	109
10	"Voar é ver"	7	7	10	10	7	7	8	7	8	1	7	8	12	10	8	6	7	7		8	145
11	"Todas as ruas do amor"	12	7	12	12	12	12	12	12	12	10	12	12	7	12	12	5	10	12	12	10	217
12	"Não demores (quero-te aquecer)"		2		8				2	2	2	1	5	3	4	2	1	1	1		4	40

== At Eurovision ==
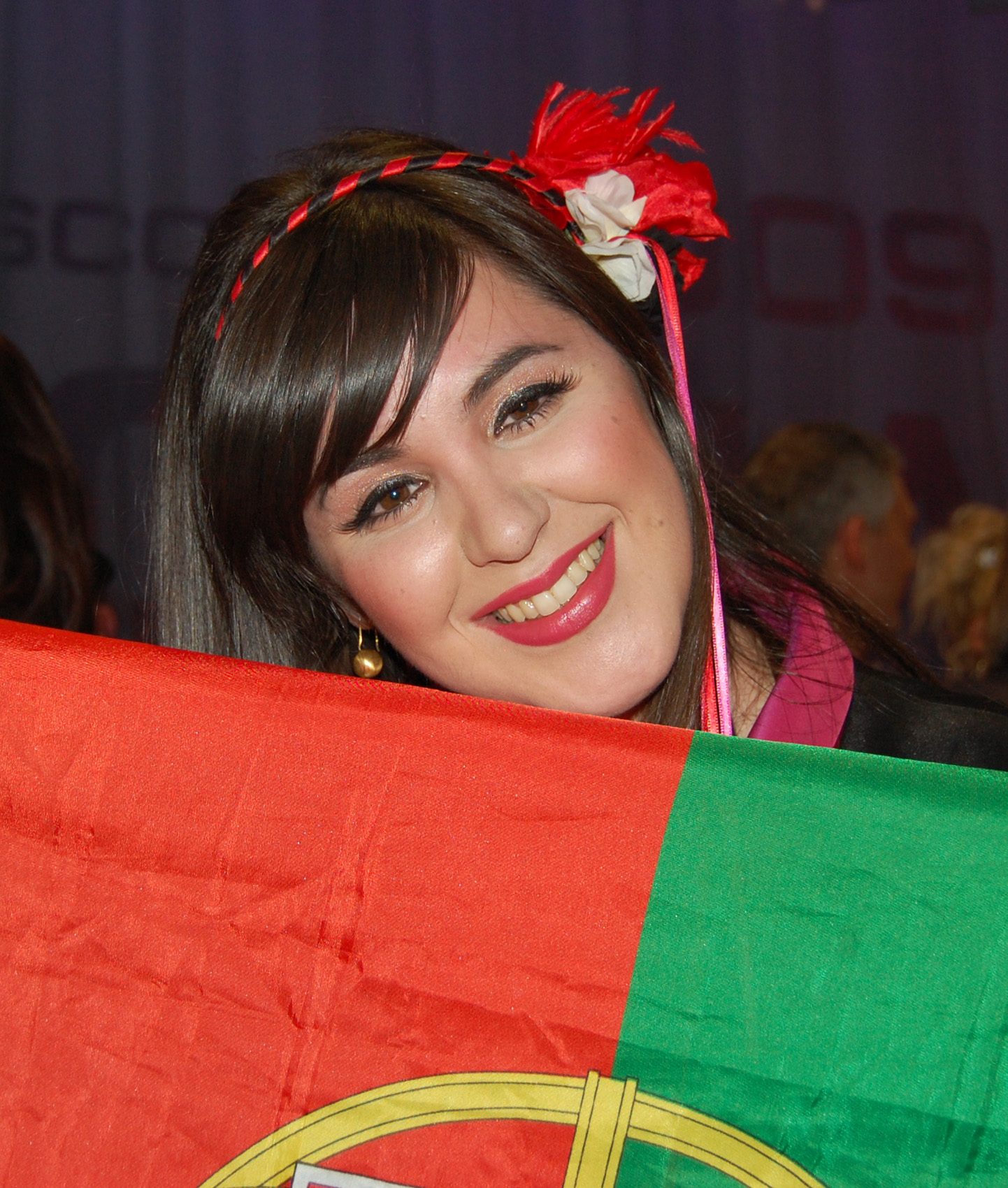
Lead singer of Flor-de-Lis, Daniela Varela, at the Eurovision Song Contest 2009

According to Eurovision rules, all nations with the exceptions of the host country and the "Big Four" (France, Germany, Spain, and the United Kingdom) are required to qualify from one of two semi-finals in order to compete for the final; the top nine songs from each semi-final as determined by televoting progress to the final, and a tenth was determined by back-up juries. The European Broadcasting Union (EBU) split up the competing countries into six different pots based on voting patterns from previous contests, with countries with favourable voting histories put into the same pot. On 30 January 2009, a special allocation draw was held which placed each country into one of the two semi-finals. Portugal was placed into the first semi-final, to be held on 12 May 2009. The running order for the semi-finals was decided through another draw on 16 March 2009 and Portugal was set to perform in position 16, following the entry from Finland and before the entry from Malta.

In Portugal, the three shows were broadcast on RTP1 and RTP Internacional with commentary by Hélder Reis. The first semi-final and the final were broadcast live, while the second semi-final was broadcast on delay. RTP appointed Helena Coelho as its spokesperson to announce the Portuguese votes during the final.

=== Semi-final ===
Flor-de-Lis took part in technical rehearsals on 17 and 21 May, followed by dress rehearsals on 24 and 25 May. The Portuguese performance featured the lead singer of Flor-de-Lis Daniela Varela wearing a black dress with purple and white parts with the other members dressed in traditional black, red and white outfits. The LED screens displayed colourfully sketched spring flowers, rainbows and clouds.

At the end of the show, Portugal was announced as having finished in the top 10 and subsequently qualifying for the grand final. It was later revealed that Portugal placed eighth in the semi-final, receiving a total of 70 points.

=== Final ===
Shortly after the first semi-final, a winners' press conference was held for the ten qualifying countries. As part of this press conference, the qualifying artists took part in a draw to determine the running order for the final. This draw was done in the order the countries appeared in the semi-final running order. Portugal was drawn to perform in position 6, following the entry from Croatia and before the entry from Iceland.

Flor-de-Lis once again took part in dress rehearsals on 15 and 16 May before the final, including the jury final where the professional juries cast their final votes before the live show. The members of Flor-de-Lis performed a repeat of their semi-final performance during the final on 16 May. At the conclusion of the voting, Portugal finished in fifteenth place with 57 points.

=== Voting ===
Voting during the three shows involved each country awarding points from 1–8, 10 and 12 as determined by a combination of 50% national jury and 50% televoting. Each nation's jury consisted of five music industry professionals who are citizens of the country they represent. This jury judged each entry based on: vocal capacity; the stage performance; the song's composition and originality; and the overall impression by the act. In addition, no member of a national jury was permitted to be related in any way to any of the competing acts in such a way that they cannot vote impartially and independently.

Following the release of the full split voting by the EBU after the conclusion of the competition, it was revealed that Portugal had placed eighteenth with both the public televote and the jury vote in the final. In the public vote, Portugal scored 64 points, while with the jury vote, Portugal scored 45 points.

Below is a breakdown of points awarded to Portugal and awarded by Portugal in the first semi-final and grand final of the contest. The nation awarded its 12 points to Iceland in the semi-final and to Moldova in the final of the contest.

==== Points awarded to Portugal ====
Points awarded to Portugal (Semi-final 1)
Score	Country
12 points	Andorra
10 points	Switzerland
8 points	Iceland
7 points	Germany; Romania
6 points	Belgium; United Kingdom
5 points	
4 points	
3 points	Bosnia and Herzegovina; Sweden
2 points	Bulgaria; Czech Republic; Finland; Israel
1 point	

Points awarded to Portugal (Final)
Score	Country
12 points	
10 points	Switzerland
8 points	Spain
7 points	Czech Republic; France; Iceland
6 points	Andorra; Belgium
5 points	
4 points	
3 points	Estonia
2 points	Slovakia
1 point	Bosnia and Herzegovina

==== Points awarded by Portugal ====
Points awarded by Portugal (Semi-final 1)
Score	Country
12 points	Iceland
10 points	Romania
8 points	Sweden
7 points	Bosnia and Herzegovina
6 points	Malta
5 points	Turkey
4 points	Andorra
3 points	Finland
2 points	Switzerland
1 point	Montenegro

Points awarded by Portugal (Final)
Score	Country
12 points	Moldova
10 points	United Kingdom
8 points	Iceland
7 points	Spain
6 points	Ukraine
5 points	Norway
4 points	Armenia
3 points	Turkey
2 points	Romania
1 point	Germany

==== Detailed voting results ====
The following members comprised the Portuguese jury:

- Ricardo Soler – singer
- Alexandra Valentim – singer
- Edgar Canelas – radio producer
- Fernando Martins – songwriter
- Paula Casanova – music agent at Sony Music

Detailed voting results from Portugal (Final)
R/O	Country	Results			Points
R/O	Country	Jury	Televoting	Combined	Points
01	Lithuania				
02	Israel	3		3	
03	France				
04	Sweden		3	3	
05	Croatia				
06	Portugal				
07	Iceland	7	6	13	8
08	Greece				
09	Armenia	8		8	4
10	Russia		2	2	
11	Azerbaijan		1	1	
12	Bosnia and Herzegovina	2		2	
13	Moldova	10	10	20	12
14	Malta				
15	Estonia				
16	Denmark	4		4	
17	Germany	5		5	1
18	Turkey	6		6	3
19	Albania				
20	Norway	1	7	8	5
21	Ukraine		8	8	6
22	Romania		5	5	2
23	United Kingdom	12	4	16	10
24	Finland				
25	Spain		12	12	7
