= Armenia in the Eurovision Song Contest 2009 =

- Eurovision Song Contest 2009
- Participating broadcaster: Public Television of Armenia (AMPTV)
- Country: Armenia
- Selection process: Evrotesil 2009
- Selection date: 14 February 2009

Competing entry
- Song: "Jan Jan"
- Artist: Inga and Anush
- Songwriters: Avet Barseghyan; Vardan Zadoyan; Mane Hakobyan

Placement
- Semi-final result: Qualified (5th, 99 points)
- Final result: 10th, 92 points

Participation chronology

Armenia was represented at the Eurovision Song Contest 2009 with the song "Jan Jan", written by Avet Barseghyan, Vardan Zadoyan and Mane Hakobyan, and performed by the duo Inga and Anush. The Armenian participating broadcaster, Public Television of Armenia (AMPTV), selected its entry through the national final Evratesil 2009. The national final took place on 14 February 2009 where twenty-one entries competed. "Jan Jan" performed by Inga and Anush was selected as the winner following the combination of votes from a professional jury and a public televote.

Armenia was drawn to compete in the first semi-final of the Eurovision Song Contest which took place on 12 May 2009. Performing during the show in position 6, "Jan Jan" was announced among the 10 qualifying entries of the first semi-final and therefore qualified to compete in the final on 16 May. It was later revealed that Armenia placed fifth out of the 18 participating countries in the semi-final with 99 points. In the final, Armenia performed in position 9 and placed tenth out of the 25 participating countries with 92 points.

== Background ==
Prior to the 2009 contest, Public Television of Armenia (AMPTV) had participated in the Eurovision Song Contest representing Armenia three times since its first entry in 2006. Since 2006, all of Armenia's entries have featured in the final. Its highest placing in the contest, to this point, has been fourth place, which the nation achieved in 2008 with the song "Qélé, Qélé" performed by Sirusho.

As part of its duties as participating broadcaster, AMPTV organises the selection of its entry in the Eurovision Song Contest and broadcasts the event in the country. The broadcaster confirmed its intentions to participate at the 2009 contest on 9 January 2009. AMPTV has used various methods to select its entry in the past, such as a live televised national final to choose the performer, song or both to compete at Eurovision. However internal selections have also been held on occasion. In 2008, the broadcaster opted to internally select the artist, with a national final being organized to select the song. It opted to organize a national final to select both the artist and the song for the 2009 contest, a procedure that had only been used once before to select Armenia's entry in 2007.

== Before Eurovision ==
=== Evrotesil 2009 ===
Evrotesil 2009 ; Եվրոտեսիլ 2009 was the national final that selected the Armenian entry for the Eurovision Song Contest 2009. The competition took place on 14 February 2009 at the Sport and Concert Complex in Yerevan, hosted by Gohar Gasparyan and Avet Barseghyan and broadcast on Channel 1. The 21 participating acts were selected by the broadcaster following a submission period which was open from 9 January through 7 February 2009; of the 47 submissions received, 21 were selected to compete. Prior to the event, the competing acts were presented to the public during a press conference on 12 February 2009. Interval acts for the event featured Armenian Eurovision 2007 entrant Hayko with "Anytime You Need" and Armenian Eurovision 2008 entrant Sirusho with "Qélé, Qélé". At the close of voting, "Jan Jan" performed by Inga and Anush Arshakyan, was determined to the winner, having been selected by the 50/50 combination of votes from a professional jury and a public vote.

R/O	Artist	Song	Songwriter(s)	Jury	Televote		Total	Place
R/O	Artist	Song	Songwriter(s)	Jury	Votes	Points	Total	Place
1	Iren	"Miayn du" (Միայն դու)	Arek Arustamyan, Nana Gabrielyan	0	91	0	0	14
2	Hasmik Margaryan	"Erazanq" (Երազանք)	Hasmik Margaryan	0	62	0	0	16
3	The Beautified Project	"Butterfly"	The Beautified Project, Andre Simonian	0	223	2	2	11
4	Hay-ya	"Molto Bello"	Artyom Hakobyan, Artur Primac	4	173	1	5	8
5	Marta Bulbulyan	"Es antarri perin em" (Ես անտառի փերին եմ)	Arman Harutyunyan	0	55	0	0	18
6	Inga and Anush Arshakyan	"Jan Jan" (Ջան Ջան)	Avet Barseghyan, Vardan Zadoyan, Mane Hakobyan	12	5,416	12	24	1
7	Oxygen	"Pare andzrevi" (Պարե անձրևի)	Artyom Hakobyan	0	9	0	0	21
8	Artem Avun	"Eternal Fire"	Artyom Hakobyan	0	82	0	0	15
9	Shprot	"Lucky"	DJ Sergio, Garik Papoyan	6	1,055	7	13	5
10	Hayk Kasparov	"Give Me an Answer"	Hayk Kasparov, Gayane Sahakyan	0	50	0	0	19
11	Arman Harutyunyan	"Come On, My Friends"	Arman Harutyunyan	0	57	0	0	17
12	Guj	"Ko dem" (Քո դեմ)	Guj Durgaryan	0	23	0	0	20
13	Lilu	"Et ari" (Ետ արի)	Richard Madlenyan, DerHova	0	353	4	4	9
14	Davit Minasyan	"Kez yerkem" (Քեզ երկեմ)	Davit Minasyan	1	90	0	1	12
15	Mher	"Ay-Ay-Ay"	Mher, Philip Renner	7	4,493	10	17	2
16	Dorians	"Fly"	Gor Sujyan, Vardan Zadoyan	10	874	6	16	3
17	Bambir	"Yolk"	Bambir	5	1,134	8	13	4
18	Hripsime Hakobyan	"Eli Eli" (Էլի Էլի)	Vahram Petrosyan	2	272	3	5	7
19	Davo	"Dzerkere ver" (Ձեռքերը վեր)	HT Hayko, David Miroyan	0	100	0	0	13
20	Tigran Petrosyan	"Only Time"	Hayk Hakobyan, Vardan Zadoyan	8	495	5	13	6
21	Sergey Grigoryan	"Kez hamar" (Քեզ համար)	Karen Grigoryan, Sergey Grigoryan	3	127	0	3	10

=== Controversy ===
Following Inga and Anush's win at the Armenian national final, Azerbaijani press claimed that "Jan Jan" had fully copied the song "Nakhchivani", which was composed more than 30 years ago by Azerbaijani composer Tofig Guliyev. However, it was deemed that both songs barely resemble one another with only slight similarities of regional rhythms and instrumentation.

=== Promotion ===
Inga and Anush made several appearances across Europe to specifically promote "Jan Jan" as the Armenian Eurovision entry. On 4 April, Inga and Anush performed during the Armenia Tashir Awards which was held in Moscow, Russia. On 18 April, Inga and Anush performed during the Eurovision Promo Concert, which was held at the Café de Paris venue in Amsterdam, Netherlands and hosted by Marga Bult and Maggie MacNeal.

== At Eurovision ==
All countries except the "Big Four" (France, Germany, Spain and the United Kingdom), and the host country, are required to qualify from one of two semi-finals in order to compete for the final; the top nine songs from each semi-final as determined by televoting progress to the final, and a tenth was determined by back-up juries. The European Broadcasting Union (EBU) split up the competing countries into six different pots based on voting patterns from previous contests, with countries with favourable voting histories put into the same pot. On 12 May 2009, a special allocation draw was held which placed each country into one of the two semi-finals. Armenia was placed into the first semi-final, to be held on 12 May 2009. The running order for the semi-finals was decided through another draw on 16 March 2009 and Armenia was set to perform in position 6, following the entry from Sweden and before the entry from Andorra.

In Armenia, the two semi-finals and the final were broadcast on Channel 1. The Armenian spokesperson, who announced the Armenian votes during the final, was Sirusho who had previously represented Armenia in the Eurovision Song Contest in 2008.

=== Semi-final ===
Inga and Anush took part in technical rehearsals on 3 and 8 May, followed by dress rehearsals on 11 and 12 May. The Armenian performance featured Inga and Anush dressed in dark blue coats with black collars and hats with braids attached performing on stage together with four dancers. The stage presentation, created by Russian design agency Fresh Art, began with the performers seated on a blue pedestal in the middle of the stage. The singers then stood up with the dancers leaving the pedestal to perform a dance routine on the stage floor. The performance also included smoke and pyrotechnic flame effects as well as green laser rays, and the LED screens projected ornaments and symbols in predominantly green and pink colours.

At the end of the show, Armenia was announced as having finished in the top 10 and subsequently qualifying for the grand final. It was later revealed that Armenia placed fifth in the semi-final, receiving a total of 99 points.

=== Final ===
Shortly after the first semi-final, a winners' press conference was held for the ten qualifying countries. As part of this press conference, the qualifying artists took part in a draw to determine the running order for the final. This draw was done in the order the countries appeared in the semi-final running order. Armenia was drawn to perform in position 9, following the entry from Greece and before the entry from Russia.

Inga and Anush once again took part in dress rehearsals on 15 and 16 May before the final, including the jury final where the professional juries cast their final votes before the live show. Inga and Anush performed a repeat of their semi-final performance during the final on 16 May. At the conclusion of the voting, Armenia finished in tenth place with 92 points.

=== Voting ===
The voting system for 2009 involved each country awarding points from 1–8, 10 and 12, with the points in the final being decided by a combination of 50% national jury and 50% televoting. Each nation's jury consisted of five music industry professionals who are citizens of the country they represent. This jury judged each entry based on: vocal capacity; the stage performance; the song's composition and originality; and the overall impression by the act. In addition, no member of a national jury was permitted to be related in any way to any of the competing acts in such a way that they cannot vote impartially and independently.

Following the release of the full split voting by the EBU after the conclusion of the competition, it was revealed that Armenia had placed ninth with the public televote and fifteenth with the jury vote in the final. In the public vote, Armenia scored 111 points, while with the jury vote, Armenia scored 71 points.

Below is a breakdown of points awarded to Armenia and awarded by Armenia in the first semi-final and grand final of the contest. The nation awarded its 12 points to Iceland in the semi-final and to Russia in the final of the contest.

==== Points awarded to Armenia ====
Points awarded to Armenia (Semi-final 1)
Score	Country
12 points	Czech Republic
10 points	Belarus; Belgium; Germany; Israel; Turkey
8 points	Bulgaria; Romania
7 points	
6 points	
5 points	Sweden; United Kingdom
4 points	Montenegro
3 points	
2 points	Iceland; Macedonia
1 point	Bosnia and Herzegovina; Finland; Switzerland

Points awarded to Armenia (Final)
Score	Country
12 points	Czech Republic
10 points	
8 points	Israel
7 points	Belgium; Romania
6 points	Bulgaria; France; Turkey
5 points	Iceland; Netherlands; Russia
4 points	Cyprus; Portugal; Spain
3 points	Slovakia; Sweden
2 points	Poland; Ukraine
1 point	Belarus; Finland; Macedonia

==== Points awarded by Armenia ====
Points awarded by Armenia (Semi-final 1)
Score	Country
12 points	Iceland
10 points	Turkey
8 points	Sweden
7 points	Israel
6 points	Bosnia and Herzegovina
5 points	Montenegro
4 points	Belarus
3 points	Malta
2 points	Romania
1 point	Belgium

Points awarded by Armenia (Final)
Score	Country
12 points	Russia
10 points	Greece
8 points	Norway
7 points	United Kingdom
6 points	France
5 points	Iceland
4 points	Turkey
3 points	Ukraine
2 points	Moldova
1 point	Azerbaijan

==== Detailed voting results ====
Detailed voting results from Armenia (Final)
R/O	Country	Results			Points
R/O	Country	Jury	Televoting	Combined	Points
01	Lithuania				
02	Israel				
03	France	3	8	11	6
04	Sweden				
05	Croatia		1	1	
06	Portugal				
07	Iceland	5	6	11	5
08	Greece	10	7	17	10
09	Armenia				
10	Russia	12	10	22	12
11	Azerbaijan		3	3	1
12	Bosnia and Herzegovina				
13	Moldova	4		4	2
14	Malta	2		2	
15	Estonia		2	2	
16	Denmark				
17	Germany				
18	Turkey	7	4	11	4
19	Albania				
20	Norway	1	12	13	8
21	Ukraine	6		6	3
22	Romania				
23	United Kingdom	8	5	13	7
24	Finland				
25	Spain				
