= Adelina Thaçi =

Kosovar singer

- Born: 31 May 1980 (age 46); Pristina, SFR Yugoslavia (now Kosovo)
- Genres: Pop
- Occupations: Singer, vocal teacher
- Years active: 1998–present

Adelina Thaçi (born 31 May, 1980) is a Kosovar singer and vocal teacher who predominantly sings in Albanian.

== Biography ==
Adelina Thaçi was born on 31 May 1980, to Rasim Thaçi (1949–2021), one of the most popular Kosovar comedians and to a doctor mother and part-time singer, Shukrie Thaçi (born 10 December 1957). She was born in Pristina, the capital of the Republic of Kosovo, then part of SFR Yugoslavia. She started working with music after being registered at a musical high school in her hometown. A few years later, in 1998 she released her first album "Liri e jete pa lote". In 2001 she released "Shko" (Go), penned by Alfred Kaçinari, which became an instant hit. Since then, she was very active in the Albanian music industry. In 2002 releases the album Te Pres and in 2003 released the music video "Komsi Komsa".

She made a big return in September 2013 when she entered Kënga Magjike with "Po u mërzite" (If you're sad). She dedicated the song to young people with special needs.

== Personal life ==
In 2010 she married Bardhyl Meta, and gave birth to a baby girl in January 2012. She temporarily withdrew from music to spend more time with her daughter.

== Discography ==
=== Albums ===
- 1999: Liri e jete pa lote
- 2001: Njehere ne jete
- 2003: Te Pres
- 2005: Nene moj

=== Singles ===
- 2001: "Shko"
- 2003: "Comsi-Comsa"
- 2013: "Po u mërzite"
