= Turkey in the Eurovision Song Contest 2009 =

- Eurovision Song Contest 2009
- Participating broadcaster: Türkiye Radyo ve Televizyon Kurumu (TRT)
- Country: Turkey
- Selection process: Internal selection
- Announcement date: Artist: 21 October 2008; Song: 1 January 2009

Competing entry
- Song: "Düm Tek Tek"
- Artist: Hadise
- Songwriters: Sinan Akçıl; Stefan Fernande; Hadise

Placement
- Semi-final result: Qualified (2nd, 172 points)
- Final result: 4th, 177 points

Participation chronology

Turkey was represented at the Eurovision Song Contest 2009 with the song "Düm Tek Tek" written by Sinan Akçıl, Stefan Fernande, and Hadise, and performed by Hadise herself. The Turkish participating broadcaster, Türkiye Radyo ve Televizyon Kurumu (TRT), internally selected its entry for the contest.

Turkey was drawn to compete in the first semi-final of the Eurovision Song Contest which took place on 12 May 2009. Performing during the show in position 9, "Düm Tek Tek" was announced among the top 10 entries of the second semi-final and therefore qualified to compete in the final on 16 May. It was later revealed that Turkey placed 2nd out of the 18 participating countries in the semi-final with 172 points. In the final, Turkey performed in position 18 and placed 4th out of the 25 participating countries, scoring 177 points.

== Before Eurovision ==
=== Internal selection ===
On 18 September 2008, TRT opened the suggestions for the public to nominate potential artists for consideration. In October 2008, TRT announced that two artists were shortlisted following public input: Hadise and Şebnem Ferah. Hadise was considered due to her being a likeable artist that would appeal to the European countries, while Ferah was considered as her rock music would be better for the contest. On 21 October 2008, TRT announced that it had internally selected Belgian-Turkish singer Hadise to represent Turkey at the Eurovision Song Contest 2009. It was also announced that she would have total control of the song she would perform at the contest, including the lyricist, composer, arranger and language of the song. The singer later stated that she would be personally working on the lyrics as well as possibly collaborating with songwriters in Belgium. Three songs were submitted by Hadise to the broadcaster in December 2008 and a selection committee selected "Düm Tek Tek" as the song she would perform at the contest.

On 1 January 2009, "Düm Tek Tek" was presented to the public during the TRT New Year's Eve television special. As such, Turkey was one of the first countries to have had its artist and song selected for the 2009 Eurovision Song Contest, and only the second to do so before the end of 2008. The song was written by Sinan Akçıl, Stefan Fernande, as well as Hadise herself.

== At Eurovision ==
Turkey competed in one of the two semi-finals after Mor ve Ötesi came 7th in the 2008 contest. In the semi-final 1 she performed 9th, following Switzerland and preceding Israel. Turkey was ranked second, with 172 points and qualifying for the final. In the final, Turkey performed 18th, following Germany and preceding Albania, and ended 4th with 177 points.

=== Voting ===
==== Points awarded to Turkey ====
Points awarded to Turkey (Semi-final 1)
Score	Country
12 points	Belgium; Bosnia and Herzegovina; Bulgaria; Germany; Macedonia; Romania; Switzerland; United Kingdom
10 points	Armenia; Malta
8 points	Montenegro
7 points	Finland; Iceland; Sweden
6 points	Belarus; Israel
5 points	Andorra; Czech Republic; Portugal
4 points	
3 points	
2 points	
1 point	

Points awarded to Turkey (Final)
Score	Country
12 points	Azerbaijan; Belgium; France; Macedonia; Switzerland; United Kingdom
10 points	Albania; Bulgaria; Germany
8 points	Netherlands
7 points	Bosnia and Herzegovina; Norway
6 points	Denmark; Romania; Sweden
5 points	Finland; Hungary; Malta
4 points	Armenia
3 points	Greece; Israel; Montenegro; Portugal
2 points	Spain
1 point	Croatia; Czech Republic

==== Points awarded by Turkey ====
Points awarded by Turkey (Semi-final 1)
Score	Country
12 points	Bosnia and Herzegovina
10 points	Armenia
8 points	Iceland
7 points	Romania
6 points	Macedonia
5 points	Montenegro
4 points	Sweden
3 points	Israel
2 points	Bulgaria
1 point	Andorra

Points awarded by Turkey (Final)
Score	Country
12 points	Azerbaijan
10 points	Albania
8 points	Bosnia and Herzegovina
7 points	Moldova
6 points	Armenia
5 points	Romania
4 points	Russia
3 points	Norway
2 points	Iceland
1 point	Germany

==== Detailed voting results ====
Detailed voting results from Turkey (Final)
R/O	Country	Results			Points
R/O	Country	Jury	Televoting	Combined	Points
01	Lithuania				
02	Israel				
03	France				
04	Sweden	3		3	
05	Croatia	2		2	
06	Portugal				
07	Iceland		5	5	2
08	Greece		1	1	
09	Armenia		10	10	6
10	Russia	8		8	4
11	Azerbaijan	12	12	24	12
12	Bosnia and Herzegovina	4	8	12	8
13	Moldova	6	6	12	7
14	Malta				
15	Estonia				
16	Denmark				
17	Germany	5		5	1
18	Turkey				
19	Albania	10	4	14	10
20	Norway		7	7	3
21	Ukraine	1	2	3	
22	Romania	7	3	10	5
23	United Kingdom				
24	Finland				
25	Spain				
