= Romania in the Eurovision Song Contest 2009 =

- Eurovision Song Contest 2009
- Participating broadcaster: Televiziunea Română (TVR)
- Country: Romania
- Selection process: Selecția Națională 2009
- Selection date: 31 January 2009

Competing entry
- Song: "The Balkan Girls"
- Artist: Elena
- Songwriters: Ovidiu Bistriţeanu; Laurenţiu Duţă; Daris Mangal; Alexandru Pelin

Placement
- Semi-final result: Qualified (9th, 67 points)
- Final result: 19th, 40 points

Participation chronology

Romania was represented at the Eurovision Song Contest 2009 with the song "The Balkan Girls", written by Ovidiu Bistriţeanu, Laurenţiu Duţă, Daris Mangal, and Alexandru Pelin, and performed by Elena. The Romanian participating broadcaster, Televiziunea Română (TVR), organised the national selection competition Selecția Națională 2009 in order to select its entry. Prior to the 2009 contest, it competed eleven times since its first entry in 1994. Its highest placing in the contest had been third place, achieved in 2005. In 2008, it finished in 20th place. "The Balkan Girls" attained local commercial success, topping the Romanian Top 100 in April.

The song was promoted by a music video and live performances in the Netherlands, Belgium, Germany and the United Kingdom. Romania qualified in ninth place from the contest's first semi-final on 12 May and ultimately reached 19th place in the Grand Final on 16 May, achieving 40 points. Elena was accompanied by four female dancers and a background singer during her performance. Conceived as a reinterpretation of the Ieles in Romanian mythology, the show was aided by 3D computer graphics of a blooming forest.

== Before Eurovision ==
=== Selecția Națională 2009 ===
==== Competing entries ====
Televiziunea Română (TVR) organised Selecția Națională 2009, a competition to select its entry for the Eurovision Song Contest 2009. In early January 2009, the broadcaster published a provisory list of 24 contestants. Out of 177 eligible tracks submitted to TVR from 15 November to 23 December, the entries were chosen on 8 January by an 11-member jury made up of music professionals and media personalities: Zoia Alecu, Sanda Cepraga, Cătălin Crișan, Adrian Despot, Viorel Găvrilă, Mihai Georgescu, Bogdan Miu, George Natsis, George Popa, Răzvan Popescu and Mihai Trăistariu. The submission deadline had been initially set to 15 December, with its extension to attract more entries promopting sources including Gardianul to incorrectly state that this was because only five songs had been submitted. For the first time, Selecția Națională was restricted solely to Romanian composers.

Artist	Song	Songwriter(s)
Alexa	"A Girl Like Me"	Sebastian Barac; Radu Bolfea
Alexa	"One Last Night"	Cornel Ilie
Blaxy Girls	"Dear Mama"	Costi Ioniță; Ruxandra Iliescu
Cătălin	"Stop"	Eduard Cîrcotă; Cristian Hrișcu-Badea
Dalma	"Love Was Never Her Friend"	Marius Moga
DD (Note: The song was initially credited to Adina Drăgoescu.)	"Everyday"	Adina Drăgoescu; Marius Pop
Elena (Note: Her last name, Gheorghe, was only included during the Selecția Națională process, and removed afterwards.)	"The Balkan Girls"	Ovidiu Bistriţeanu; Laurenţiu Duţă; Daris Mangal; Alexandru Pelin
Ethnic	"The Love Is the Life"	Dan Lăzărică
Costi Ioniță	"Can You Forgive"	Costi Ioniță; Ruxandra Iliescu
Imba	"Round & Round"	Costi Ioniță; Oana Radu
Besa Kokëdhima	"Nothing Gonna Change"	Sebastian Badiu
Adrian Molnar	"Go On"	Florin Dumitrescu; Ion Faghiura; Norbert Kovacs
Alin Nica	"Don't Leave"	George Hora
Nico and Moni-K	"Disco Maniacs"	Monica Mândrescu; Laurențiu Matei
Floriana Pachia	"Take the Chance"	Floriana Pachia
Irina Popa	"I Feel Your Presence"	Harko Boti; Adrian Ordean
Popas Band	"Strigă"	Marius Popa
Red Blonde	"Nu am cu cine"	Marius Moga
SoundCheck (Note: The song was initially credited to Cristina Șchiopu.)	"You Are My Love"	Cătălin Huţanu
Tabasco	"Purple"	Ion Faghiura; Norbert Kovacs
Tina	"Pleacă"	Cornel Ilie
Juan Xavier	"Perdóname"	Ionuț Botea
Romeo Zaharia	"Someone Like You"	Mihaela Barbu; Romeo Zaharia
Zero	"Sunny Days"	Sebastian Barac; Radu Bolfea; Marcel Botezan

==== Shows ====
Selecția Națională 2009 was divided in two semi-finals on 27 and 29 January, and the final on 31 January. The results in each show of the competition—hosted by Radio 21 hosts Orlando, Escu and Popescu—were determined by a 50/50 combination of votes from a jury panel and a public televote. The six best-ranked entries from each semi-final advanced to the final round. On the latter occasion, Swedish trio Biondo was employed as the interval act. All participants had been promoted by music videos that were broadcast by TVR. The jury that analysed the songs in the final was composed of Dana Dorian, Liana Elekes, Cristian Faur, Andrei Kerestely, Ștefan Neaftanaila, Marcel Pavel, Aura Urziceanu, George Zafiu and Cristian Zgabercea.

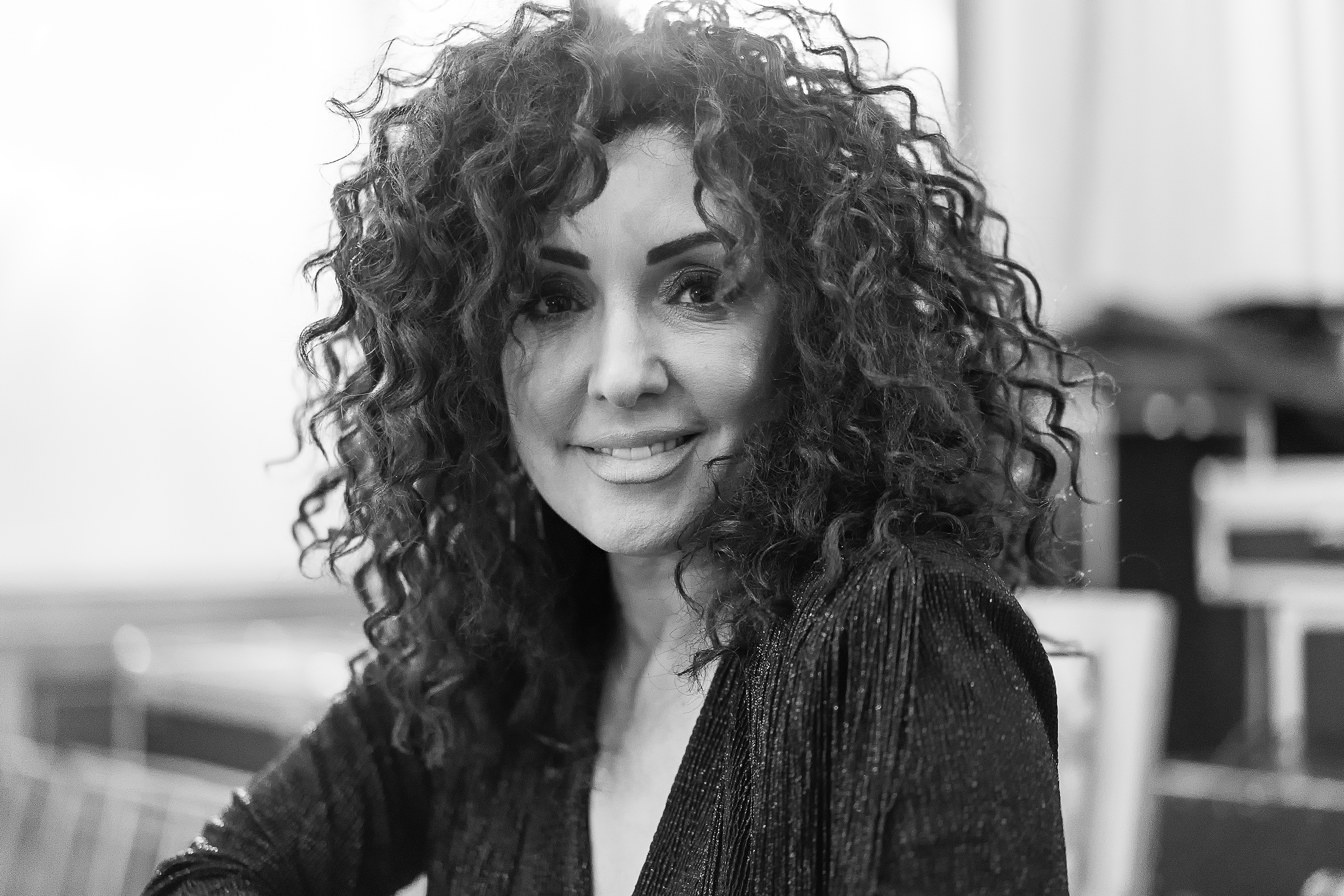
Among the contestants in the first semi-final was also Nico (pictured in 2018), who had represented Romania in 2008 with "Pe-o margine de lume" alongside Vlad.

Semi-final 1 – 27 January
R/O	Artist	Song	Result
01	Zero	"Sunny Days"	Qualified
02	Nico and Moni-K	"Disco Maniacs"	—N/a
03	DD	"Everyday"	—N/a
04	Romeo Zaharia	"Someone Like You"	—N/a
05	Floriana Pachia	"Take the Chance"	—N/a
06	Alexa	"A Girl Like Me"	—N/a
07	Popas Band	"Strigă"	Qualified
08	Juan Xavier	"Perdóname"	—N/a
09	Tabasco	"Purple"	Qualified
10	Tina	"Pleacă"	Qualified
11	Dalma	"Love Was Never Her Friend"	Qualified
12	Blaxy Girls	"Dear Mama"	Qualified

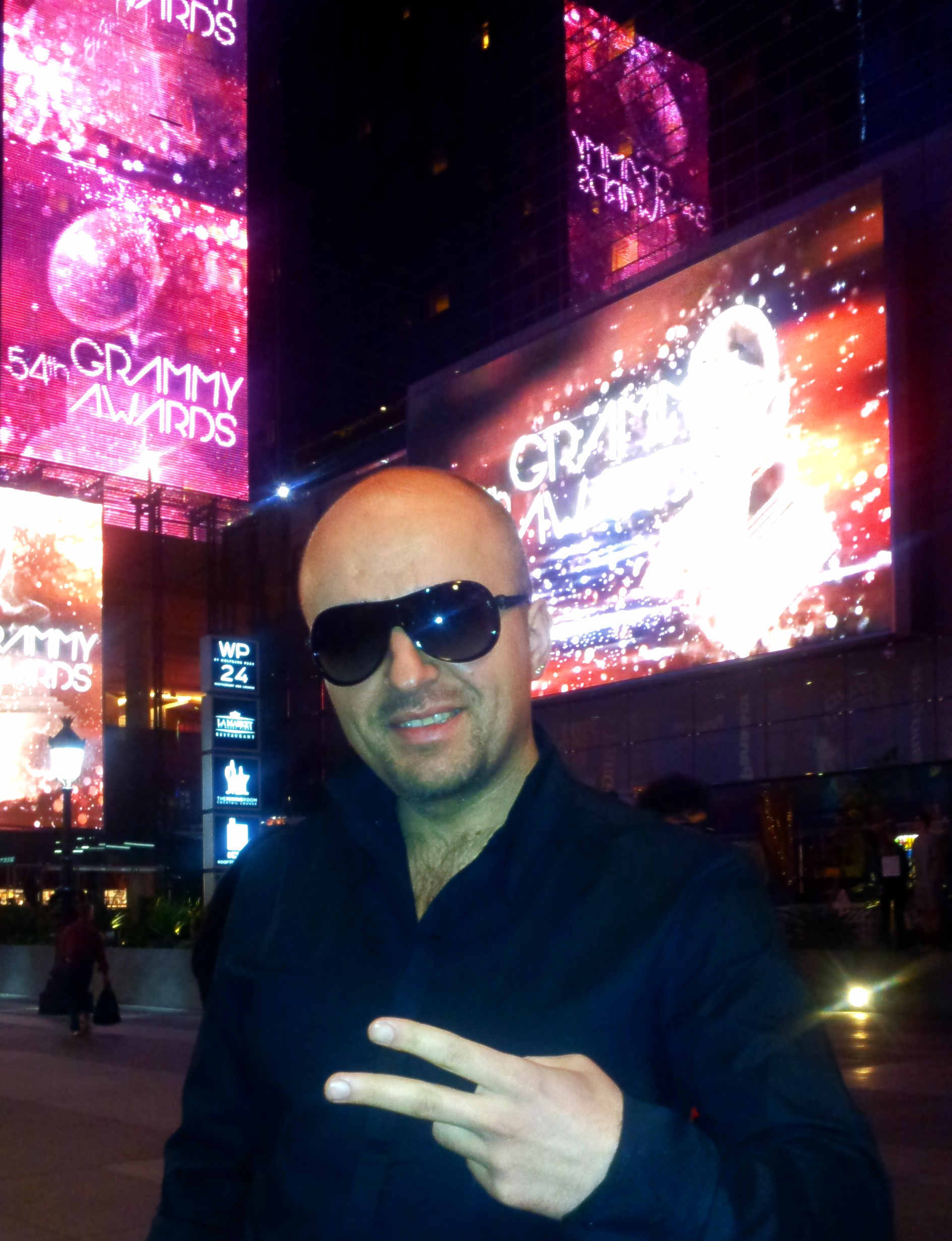
Costi Ioniță (pictured in 2012) competed in the second semi-final with his song "Can You Forgive". Additionally, he composed Imba's "Round & Round"; both advanced.

Semi-final 2 – 29 January
R/O	Artist	Song	Result
01	Besa Kokëdhima	"Nothing Gonna Change"	—N/a
02	Red Blonde	"Nu am cu cine"	Qualified
03	Adrian Molnar	"Go On"	—N/a
04	Cătălin	"Stop"	Qualified
05	SoundCheck	"You Are My Love"	—N/a
06	Ethnic	"The Love Is the Life"	—N/a
07	Irina Popa	"I Feel Your Presence"	—N/a
08	Alexa	"One Last Night"	—N/a
09	Alin Nica	"Don't Leave"	Qualified
10	Imba	"Round & Round"	Qualified
11	Costi Ioniță	"Can You Forgive"	Qualified
12	Elena	"The Balkan Girls"	Qualified

Final – 31 January
R/O	Artist	Song	Jury	Televote		Total	Place
R/O	Artist	Song	Jury	Votes	Points	Total	Place
01	Popas Band	"Strigă"	4	612	1	5	8
02	Costi Ioniță	"Can You Forgive"	3	528	0	3	10
03	Blaxy Girls	"Dear Mama"	6	4,861	12	18	2
04	Red Blonde	"Nu am cu cine"	2	878	2	4	9
05	Zero	"Sunny Days"	7	1,322	5	12	4
06	Elena	"The Balkan Girls"	12	3,503	10	22	1
07	Tabasco	"Purple"	8	1,239	4	12	4
08	Cătălin	"Stop"	10	2,360	8	18	2
09	Dalma	"Love Was Never Her Friend"	5	1,834	6	11	6
10	Alin Nica	"Don't Leave"	0	1,178	3	3	10
11	Tina	"Pleacă"	1	2,328	7	8	7
12	Imba	"Round & Round"	0	463	0	0	12

=== Promotion ===
To promote "The Balkan Girls", an accompanying music video was directed by Dragoș Buliga close to disused railway bridges in Argeș County and at Bucharest's Silver Church Club. It was premiered on 15 March 2009 on TVR1's Danutz S. R. L., and was subsequently uploaded to YouTube the following day. In the same month, an alternative clip was shot for Radio 21's Women's Day campaign. Elena performed "The Balkan Girls" several times prior to Eurovision, including during events in the Netherlands and Belgium. She sang the song at the ITB Berlin in March; she was interviewed by the Berlin press and sent the track to local radio and television stations. Furthermore, the singer performed "The Balkan Girls" at the UK Eurovision Preview Party in London's Scala club, and her Eurovision participation was endorsed by an advertisement from Romanian football manager Gheorghe Hagi.

== At Eurovision ==
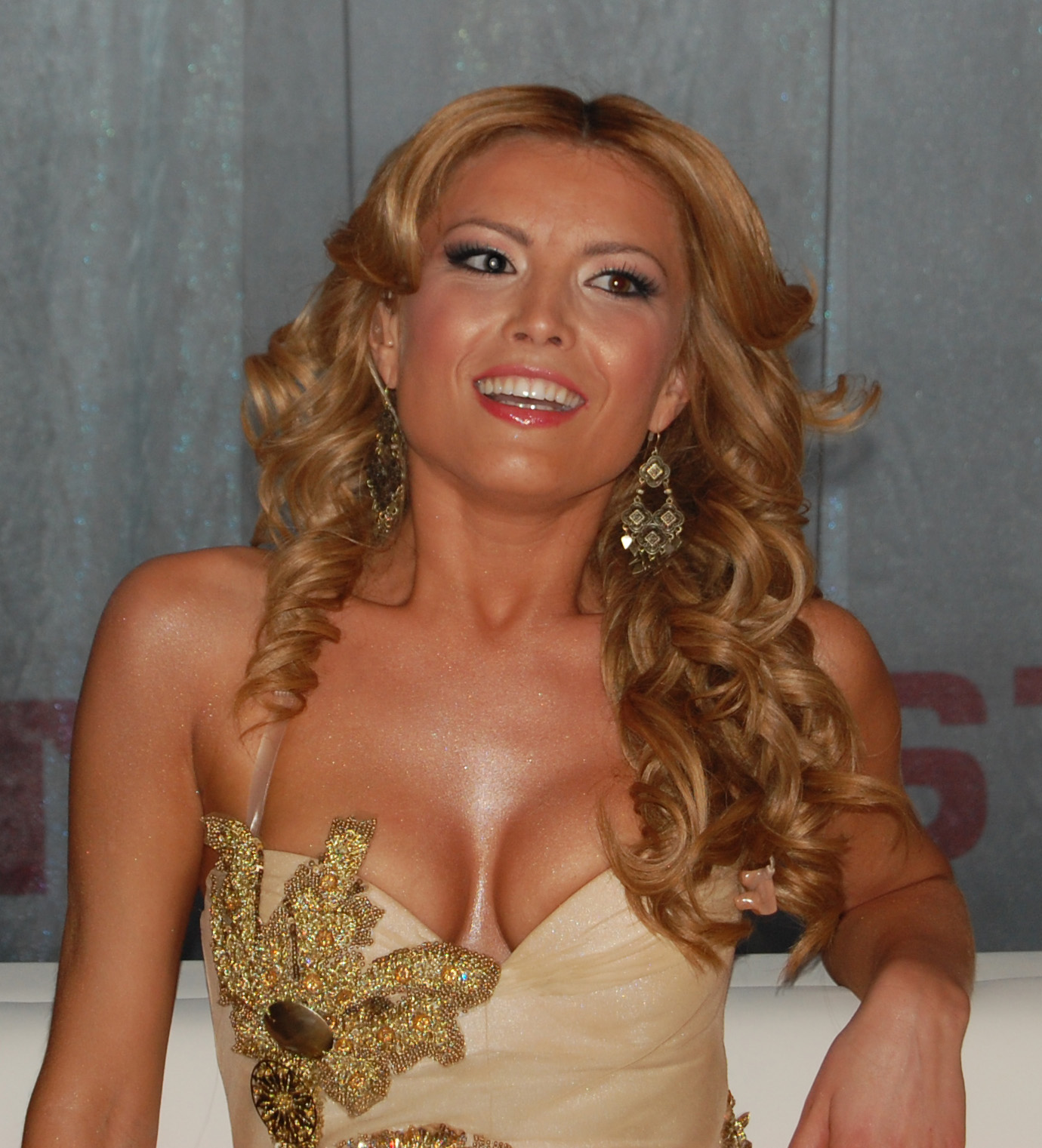
Elena wearing the flesh-colored dress she sported during her performance.

The Eurovision Song Contest 2009, at the Olympic Indoor Arena in Moscow, consisted of two semi-finals on 12 and 14 May, respectively, and the final on 16 May. According to Eurovision rules, all participating countries except the host and the "Big Four" (France, Germany, Spain and the United Kingdom) were required to advance from a semi-final to compete in the final; the top ten countries from each semi-finals progressed to the final. In Romania, the show was broadcast on TVR, with Dan Manoliu as the country's head of delegation. Elena was scheduled for technical rehearsals on 4, 8 and 11 May. She performed 14th in the first semi-final, preceded by North Macedonia and followed by Finland, and sang 22nd in the Grand Final, preceded by Ukraine and followed by the United Kingdom.

The concept of Elena's show—directed by Bobo Bărbulescu—was a "modern reinterpretation" of the Ieles, feminine creatures in Romanian mythology. Thus, the four female dancers accompanying the singer onstage wore hair extensions and "shredded mermaid frocks"; Elena sported a flesh-colored dress and high heels. She was also aided by the background vocalist Lucia Dumitrescu. 3D computer graphics were used during the performance, seeing a "mysterious" forest bloom as a sunrise is depicted. The show further made use of a 100-kilogram (220 lb) fiberglass-and-polyurethane throne. Alongside Bărbulescu, Oana Drăghici was hired as the art director, Ioana Macarie as the choreographer and Matei Ovejad as the special effects supervisor.

=== Voting ===
Below is a breakdown of points awarded to Romania in the contest's first semi-final and Grand Final, as well as by the country on both stages. In the semi-final, Romania finished in ninth position, being awarded a total of 67 points, including ten from Portugal and eight from Israel. In the Grand Final, the nation reached 19th place with 40 points, including 12 from Moldova and seven from Spain, one of Romania's lowest scores in the contest. Additionally, the European Broadcasting Union released the split final results, further revealing that Elena had placed 14th in the televote and 21st with the juries. Romania awarded its 12 points to Turkey in the semi-final and to Moldova in the final. For the announcement of the points, Romanian television presenter Alina Sorescu was the country's spokesperson announcing its voting results.

==== Points awarded to Romania ====
Points awarded to Romania (Semi-final 1)
Score	Country
12 points	
10 points	Portugal
8 points	Israel
7 points	Macedonia; Turkey
6 points	Bosnia and Herzegovina; Montenegro
5 points	Bulgaria
4 points	Andorra; Iceland
3 points	
2 points	Armenia; Belgium; Malta; United Kingdom
1 point	Belarus; Germany

Points awarded to Romania (Final)
Score	Country
12 points	Moldova
10 points	
8 points	
7 points	Spain
6 points	
5 points	Macedonia; Turkey
4 points	
3 points	Azerbaijan
2 points	Cyprus; Ireland; Portugal; Serbia
1 point	

==== Points awarded by Romania ====
Points awarded by Romania (Semi-final 1)
Score	Country
12 points	Turkey
10 points	Iceland
8 points	Armenia
7 points	Portugal
6 points	Malta
5 points	Bosnia and Herzegovina
4 points	Sweden
3 points	Israel
2 points	Macedonia
1 point	Finland

Points awarded by Romania (Final)
Score	Country
12 points	Moldova
10 points	Iceland
8 points	Greece
7 points	Armenia
6 points	Turkey
5 points	Norway
4 points	Azerbaijan
3 points	Malta
2 points	Denmark
1 point	Estonia

==== Detailed voting results ====
Detailed voting results from Romania (Final)
R/O	Country	Results			Points
R/O	Country	Jury	Televoting	Combined	Points
01	Lithuania				
02	Israel	2		2	
03	France		2	2	
04	Sweden				
05	Croatia				
06	Portugal				
07	Iceland	12	5	17	10
08	Greece	6	7	13	8
09	Armenia	7	4	11	7
10	Russia				
11	Azerbaijan	1	8	9	4
12	Bosnia and Herzegovina				
13	Moldova	10	12	22	12
14	Malta	8		8	3
15	Estonia		3	3	1
16	Denmark	5		5	2
17	Germany		1	1	
18	Turkey		10	10	6
19	Albania				
20	Norway	4	6	10	5
21	Ukraine				
22	Romania				
23	United Kingdom	3		3	
24	Finland				
25	Spain				
