= Kejsi Tola =

Albanian singer and songwriter (born 1992)

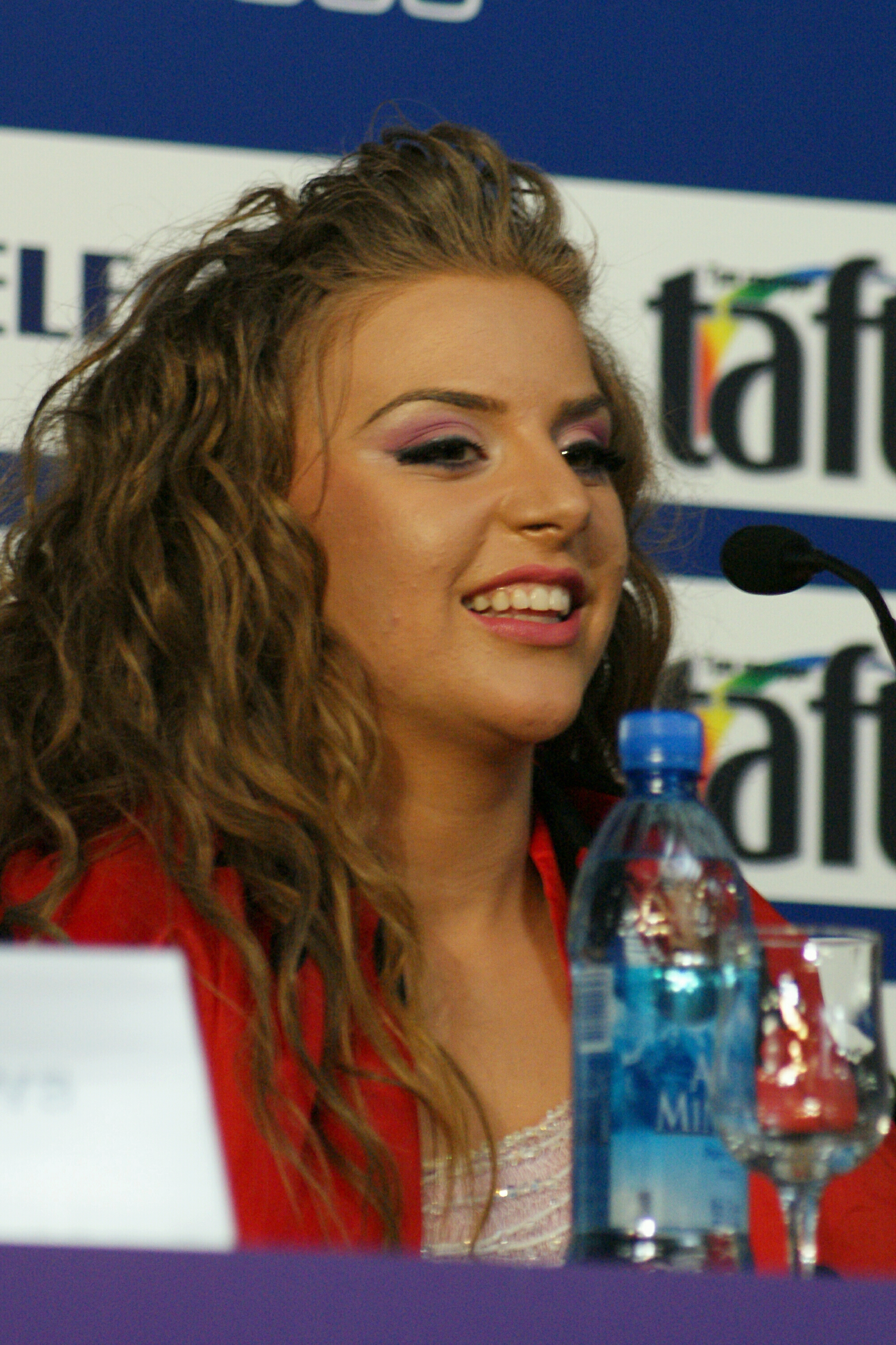
- Tola in 2009
- Born: 3 May 1992 (age 34); Vlorë, Albania
- Citizenship: Albania
- Education: Liceu Artistik Jordan Misja Akademia e Arteve
- Occupations: Singer; songwriter
- Years active: 2004–present
- Musical career
- Genres: Pop; Disco; house; R&B
- Instrument: Vocals
- Website: kejsitola.com

Kejsi Tola (Albanian: [ˈkɛjsi ˈtɔla]; born 3 May 1992) is an Albanian singer and songwriter. After winning the 47th edition of Festivali i Këngës, she represented Albania at the Eurovision Song Contest 2009.

== Career ==
Tola began performing at the age of six. She completed her studies at Jordan Misja Artistic Lyceum. At the age of 11, she won Young Voices of Albania, later becoming a two-time winner of Young Voices of Shkodra. She was one of ten finalists of Gjeniu i Vogël, and won the fourth edition of Ethet, the Albanian version of Pop Idol.

In 2008, the Albanian national broadcaster Radio Televizioni Shqiptar (RTSH) announced that Tola was one of 20 artists selected to compete in the 47th edition of Festivali i Këngës with the song "Më merr në ëndërr". On 21 December, Tola was declared the winner with 126 points, and was thus announced as the Albanian representative at the Eurovision Song Contest 2009 in Moscow, Russia. In Moscow, she performed 16th during the second semi-final and qualified for the grand final, where she later placed 17th overall with a total of 48 points.

In late 2009, it was confirmed that Tola would compete in the 48th edition of Festivali i Këngës with the song "Ndonjëherë". She competed in the final on 27 December and finished 15th with 58 points. Following her participation, she announced a hiatus to pursue classical singing at the University of Arts in Tirana.

Tola was announced as one of the participants in Festivali i Këngës 49 with the song "Pranë" on 15 November 2010, marking her third consecutive participation in the competition. She competed in the second semi-final on 24 December, but failed to qualify to the final.

In 2012, Tola participated in the 51st edition of Festivali i Këngës with the song "S'jemi më atje", where she advanced to the final after competing in the second semi-final on 20 December. In the final, she finished in 4th with 42 points.

In 2014, Tola entered Kënga Magjike with the song "Iceberg". She placed 5th and received the Production Award. She later entered Kënga Magjike in 2018 with the song "Me ke mua". The song was nominated at the 2019 Kult Awards for Best Song of the Year.

In 2023, she was selected to compete in Festivali i Këngës 62 with the song "Vallëzoj me dritën". However, she later withdrew from the competition.

As of November-December 2026, she is set to compete in Festivali i Këngës 65.

== Discography ==
=== Singles ===
- "Një Minutë" (2008)
- "Carry Me in Your Dreams" (2008)
- "Qiellin do ta Prek me Ty" (2009)
- "UAT" (2009)
- "Ndonjëherë" (2009)
- "Pranë" (2010)
- "Më Jeto" (2011)
- "Atje" (2012)
- "Perëndeshë e Fantazisë" (2012)
- "S'jemi më atje" (2012)
- "Iceberg" (2014)
- "U rritëm" (2018)
- "Më ke mua" (2018)

== Awards ==
Kënga Magjike

Year	Nominee / work	Award	Result
2009	"Qiellin Do Ta Prek Me Ty"	The First Magic	Won
2011	"Me Jeto"	Best Vocal	Won
2012	"Perendeshe e Fantazise"	AMC Fun Page Prize	Won
2014	"Iceberg"	Best Production	Won

Kult Awards

Year	Nominee / work	Award	Result
2015	"Iceberg"	Song of the Year	Nominated

Young Voices of Albania

Year	Nominee / work	Award	Result
2003	"Herself"	First Prize	Won

Young Voices of Shkodra

Year	Nominee / work	Award	Result
2003	"Herself"	First Prize	Won
2004	"Herself"	First Prize	Won

Awards and achievements
Preceded by Olta Boka with Zemrën e lamë peng	Festivali i Këngës; Winner; 2008	Succeeded by Juliana Pasha with Nuk mundem pa ty
Preceded by Olta Boka with Zemrën e lamë peng	Albania in the Eurovision Song Contest; 2009	Succeeded by Juliana Pasha with It's All About You
