= Finland in the Eurovision Song Contest 2011 =

- Eurovision Song Contest 2011
- Participating broadcaster: Yleisradio (Yle)
- Country: Finland
- Selection process: Euroviisut 2011
- Selection date: 12 February 2011

Competing entry
- Song: "Da Da Dam"
- Artist: Paradise Oskar
- Songwriters: Axel Ehnström

Placement
- Semi-final result: Qualified (3rd, 103 points)
- Final result: 21st, 57 points

Participation chronology

Finland was represented at the Eurovision Song Contest 2011 with the song "Da Da Dam" written by Axel Ehnström, and performed by Paradise Oskar, which is the artistic name of singer Axel Ehnström. The Finnish participating broadcaster, Yleisradio (Yle), organised the national final Euroviisut 2011 in order to select the Finnish entry for the contest. 15 entries were selected to compete in the national final, which consisted of three semi-finals and a final, taking place in January and February 2011. Ten entries ultimately competed in the final on 12 February where votes from the public selected "Da Da Dam" performed by Paradise Oskar as the winner.

Finland was drawn to compete in the first semi-final of the Eurovision Song Contest which took place on 10 May 2011. Performing during the show in position 10, "Da Da Dam" was announced among the top 10 entries of the first semi-final and therefore qualified to compete in the final on 14 May. It was later revealed that Finland placed third out of the 19 participating countries in the semi-final with 103 points. In the final, Finland performed in position 1 and placed twenty-first out of the 25 participating countries, scoring 57 points.

== Background ==
Prior to the 2011 contest, Yleisradio (Yle) had participated in the Eurovision Song Contest representing Finland forty-four times since its first entry in 1961. It has won the contest once in 2006 with the song "Hard Rock Hallelujah" performed by Lordi. In 2010, "Työlki ellää" performed by Kuunkuiskaajat failed to qualify Finland to the final, placing eleventh in the semi-final.

As part of its duties as participating broadcaster, Yle organises the selection of its entry in the Eurovision Song Contest and broadcasts the event in the country. The broadcaster confirmed its intentions to participate at the 2011 contest on 6 June 2010. Yle had selected its entries for the contest through national final competitions that have varied in format over the years. Since 1961, a selection show that was often titled Euroviisukarsinta highlighted that the purpose of the program was to select a song for Eurovision. Along with its participation confirmation, the broadcaster also announced that its entry for the 2011 contest would be selected through the Euroviisut selection show.

== Before Eurovision ==
=== Euroviisut 2011 ===
Euroviisut 2011 was the national final that selected Finland's entries for the Eurovision Song Contest 2011. The competition consisted of four shows that commenced with the first of three semi-finals on 14 January 2011 and concluded with a final on 12 February 2011. The four shows were hosted by Eurovision Song Contest 2007 host Jaana Pelkonen and YleX DJ Tom Nylund. All shows were broadcast on Yle TV2 and online at yle.fi. The final was also broadcast on Yle HD and via radio on Yle Radio Suomi with commentary by Sanna Kojo.

==== Format ====
The format of the competition consisted of four shows: three semi-finals and a final. Five songs competed in each semi-final and the top three entries from each semi-final as well as a wildcard act selected by a jury from the remaining non-qualifying entries qualified to complete the ten-song lineup in the final. The results for the semi-finals and the final were determined exclusively by a public vote. Public voting included the options of telephone and SMS voting.

==== Competing entries ====
Twelve artists, including the winner of the Finnish tango contest Tangomarkkinat in 2010, Marko Maunuksela, were directly invited by Yle to compete in the national final following consultation with record companies, while an additional three acts were selected through a public online selection. For the online selection, a submission period was opened by Yle which lasted between 6 June 2010 and 31 August 2010. At least one of the writers and the lead singer(s) had to hold Finnish citizenship or live in Finland permanently in order for the entry to qualify to compete. A panel of experts appointed by Yle selected fifteen competing entries from the 277 received submissions, which were presented on 30 September 2010 at yle.fi for the public to vote through SMS until 15 October 2010. The twelve invited artists were announced during a press conference on 30 September 2010, while the three entries that qualified from the online selection and were presented during a televised programme on 16 October 2010. Among the competing artists was former Finnish Eurovision entrant Sampsa Astala (lead singer of Stala and So.) who represented Finland in 2006 as part of the band Lordi.

Online selection – 30 September–15 October 2010
R/O	Artist	Song	Songwriter(s)	Result
1	Christa Renwall	"Fool of Yourself"	Nalla Ahlstedt, Fiora Cutler, Jim Lazer	—N/a
2	Tony Green	"Miracle"	Toni Ruohonen	—N/a
3	Suvi	"We Are One"	Teemu Roivainen, Leevi Lauri	—N/a
4	Sara Sayed	"Shallow Waters"	Sara Sayed	—N/a
5	Paul Oxley	"The Prisoner"	Paul Oxley, Janne Hyöty	—N/a
6	Pauliina Salonen	"Every Day"	J-P. Järvinen	—N/a
7	Emilie Untamala and Jole Nissilä	"It Is You"	Emilie Untamala	—N/a
8	Joel Främling	"Man in Squalor"	Joni Masko	—N/a
9	Anfisa	"Give Me Power to Resist"	Anfisa Proskuryakova	—N/a
10	Chorale	"Share Your Life"	Minna Immonen, Markus Ahola	—N/a
11	Cardiant	"Rapture in Time"	Antti Hänninen, Lauri Hänninen	Qualified
12	Saara Aalto	"Blessed with Love"	Saara Aalto	Qualified
13	Sonja Bishop	"This Is My Life"	Sonja Bishop, Jorn Lendorph, Elton Theander, Jesper Zar	—N/a
14	Father McKenzie	"Good Enough"	Tobias Granbacka	Qualified
15	Blackbird	"Gooseberry"	Jussi Petäjä	—N/a

Artist	Song	Songwriter(s)
Automatic Eye	"I'm Not the One Who's Sorry"	Pete Murto, Jonas Olsson, Heikki Hiekkasalmi, Antti Aalto, Lauri Uusitalo
Cardiant	"Rapture in Time"	Antti Hänninen, Lauri Hänninen
Eveliina Määttä	"Dancing in the Dark"	Axel Johansson, Mats Tärnfors, Tracy Lipp
Father McKenzie	"Good Enough"	Tobias Granbacka
Jimi Constantine	"Party to Party"	Jimi Pääkallo, Axel, Pekko Haimi, Tracy Lipp
Johanna Iivanainen	"Luojani mun"	Johanna Iivanainen, Edu Kettunen
Jonna	"Puppets"	Jonna Pirinen, Miika Colliander
Marko Maunuksela	"Synkän maan tango"	Mika Toivanen
Milana Misic	"Sydämeni kaksi maata"	Juha Tikka, Susanna Haavisto
Paradise Oskar	"Da Da Dam"	Axel Ehnström
Saara Aalto	"Blessed with Love"	Saara Aalto
Sami Hintsanen	"Täältä maailmaan"	Antti Kleemola, Mikko Karjalainen
Soma Manuchar	"Strong"	Ellen T., Antti C.
Stala and SO.	"Pamela"	Sampsa Astala, Sami J.
Tommi Soidinmäki	"Seis!"	Petri Laaksonen, Kyösti Salokorpi

==== Semi-finals ====
The three semi-final shows took place on 14, 21 and 28 January 2011 at the YLE Studios in Helsinki. The top three from the five competing entries in each semi-final qualified to the final based on the results from the public vote. "Dancing in the Dark" performed by Eveliina Määttä was awarded the jury wildcard and also qualified to the final.

Semi-final 1 – 14 January 2011
R/O	Artist	Song	Place	Result
1	Automatic Eye	"I'm Not the One Who's Sorry"	4	—N/a
2	Marko Maunuksela	"Synkän maan tango"	2	Qualified
3	Johanna Iivanainen	"Luojani mun"	3	Qualified
4	Jonna	"Puppets"	5	—N/a
5	Cardiant	"Rapture in Time"	1	Qualified

Semi-final 2 – 21 January 2011
R/O	Artist	Song	Place	Result
1	Soma Manuchar	"Strong"	5	—N/a
2	Paradise Oskar	"Da Da Dam"	1	Qualified
3	Jimi Constantine	"Party to Party"	4	—N/a
4	Milana Misic	"Sydämeni kaksi maata"	3	Qualified
5	Father McKenzie	"Good Enough"	2	Qualified

Semi-final 3 – 28 January 2011
R/O	Artist	Song	Place	Result
1	Eveliina Määttä	"Dancing in the Dark"	4	Wildcard
2	Sami Hintsanen	"Täältä maailmaan"	2	Qualified
3	Tommi Soidinmäki	"Seis!"	5	—N/a
4	Saara Aalto	"Blessed with Love"	3	Qualified
5	Stala and SO.	"Pamela"	1	Qualified

==== Final ====
The final took place on 12 February 2011 at the Holiday Club Caribia in Turku where the ten entries that qualified from the preceding three semi-finals competed. The winner was selected over two rounds of public televoting. In the first round, the top three from the ten competing entries qualified to the second round, the superfinal. In the superfinal, "Da Da Dam" performed by Paradise Oskar was selected as the winner. In addition to the performances of the competing entries, the interval act featured Linda Lampenius and Gentlemen.

Final – 12 February 2011
R/O	Artist	Song	Place
1	Eveliina Määttä	"Dancing in the Dark"	5
2	Sami Hintsanen	"Täältä maailmaan"	7
3	Milana Misic	"Sydämeni kaksi maata"	9
4	Paradise Oskar	"Da Da Dam"	1
5	Cardiant	"Rapture in Time"	6
6	Johanna Iivanainen	"Luojani mun"	10
7	Father McKenzie	"Good Enough"	2
8	Marko Maunuksela	"Synkän maan tango"	8
9	Saara Aalto	"Blessed with Love"	3
10	Stala and SO.	"Pamela"	4

Superfinal – 12 February 2011
R/O	Artist	Song	Televote	Place
1	Paradise Oskar	"Da Da Dam"	46.7%	1
2	Father McKenzie	"Good Enough"	12.6%	3
3	Saara Aalto	"Blessed with Love"	40.7%	2

=== Promotion ===
Paradise Oskar specifically promoted "Da Da Dam" as the Finnish Eurovision entry on 14 April 2011 by performing during the Eurovision in Concert event which was held at the Club Air venue in Amsterdam, Netherlands and hosted by Cornald Maas, Esther Hart and Sascha Korf.

== At Eurovision ==
According to Eurovision rules, all nations with the exceptions of the host country and the "Big Five" (France, Germany, Italy, Spain and the United Kingdom) are required to qualify from one of two semi-finals in order to compete for the final; the top ten countries from each semi-final progress to the final. The European Broadcasting Union (EBU) split up the competing countries into six different pots based on voting patterns from previous contests, with countries with favourable voting histories put into the same pot. On 17 January 2011, a special allocation draw was held which placed each country into one of the two semi-finals, as well as which half of the show they would perform in. Finland was placed into the first semi-final, to be held on 10 May 2011, and was scheduled to perform in the first half of the show. The running order for the semi-finals was decided through another draw on 15 March 2011 and Finland was set to perform in position 10, following the entry from Georgia and before the entry from Malta.

The two semi-finals and the final were televised in Finland on Yle TV2 and Yle HD with commentary in Finnish by Tarja Närhi and Asko Murtomäki. The three shows were also broadcast on Yle FST5 with commentary in Swedish by Eva Frantz and Johan Lindroos as well as via radio with Finnish commentary by Sanna Pirkkalainen and Jorma Hietamäki on Yle Radio Suomi. The Finnish spokesperson, who announced the Finnish votes during the final, was member of 2010 Finnish Eurovision entrant Kuunkuiskaajat, Susan Aho.

=== Semi-final ===
Paradise Oskar took part in technical rehearsals on 1 and 5 May, followed by dress rehearsals on 9 and 10 May. This included the jury show on 9 May where the professional juries of each country watched and voted on the competing entries. The Finnish performance featured Paradise Oskar performing alone in a shirt and pants made of recyclable fabrics with the LED screens displaying an image of the Earth turning.

At the end of the show, Finland was announced as having finished in the top 10 and subsequently qualifying for the grand final. It was later revealed that Finland placed third in the semi-final, receiving a total of 103 points.

=== Final ===
Shortly after the first semi-final, a winners' press conference was held for the ten qualifying countries. As part of this press conference, the qualifying artists took part in a draw to determine the running order for the final. This draw was done in the order the countries were announced during the semi-final. Finland was drawn to perform in position 1, before the entry from Bosnia and Herzegovina.

Paradise Oskar once again took part in dress rehearsals on 13 and 14 May before the final, including the jury final where the professional juries cast their final votes before the live show. Paradise Oskar performed a repeat of his semi-final performance during the final on 14 May. Finland placed twenty-first in the final, scoring 57 points.

=== Voting ===
Voting during the three shows consisted of 50 percent public televoting and 50 percent from a jury deliberation. The jury consisted of five music industry professionals who were citizens of the country they represent. This jury was asked to judge each contestant based on: vocal capacity; the stage performance; the song's composition and originality; and the overall impression by the act. In addition, no member of a national jury could be related in any way to any of the competing acts in such a way that they cannot vote impartially and independently.

Following the release of the full split voting by the EBU after the conclusion of the competition, it was revealed that Finland had placed twenty-first with the public televote and seventeenth with the jury vote in the final. In the public vote, Finland scored 47 points, while with the jury vote, Finland scored 75 points. In the first semi-final, Finland placed third with the public televote and fifth with the jury vote. In the public vote, Finland scored 111 points, while with the jury vote, Finland scored 86 points.

Below is a breakdown of points awarded to Finland and awarded by Finland in the first semi-final and grand final of the contest. The nation awarded its 12 points to Hungary in the semi-final and the final of the contest.

==== Points awarded to Finland ====
Points awarded to Finland (Semi-final 1)
Score	Country
12 points	Iceland; Norway; Russia
10 points	Poland; Switzerland
8 points	Portugal
7 points	Lithuania
6 points	Armenia; Hungary; United Kingdom
5 points	
4 points	Spain
3 points	Azerbaijan; Croatia; Serbia
2 points	
1 point	Turkey

Points awarded to Finland (Final)
Score	Country
12 points	Norway
10 points	Iceland
8 points	
7 points	Estonia; Sweden
6 points	
5 points	Denmark; Poland; Switzerland
4 points	
3 points	Ireland
2 points	Germany
1 point	Lithuania

==== Points awarded by Finland ====
Points awarded by Finland (Semi-final 1)
Score	Country
12 points	Hungary
10 points	Iceland
8 points	Norway
7 points	Serbia
6 points	Switzerland
5 points	Azerbaijan
4 points	Greece
3 points	Russia
2 points	Lithuania
1 point	Georgia

Points awarded by Finland (Final)
Score	Country
12 points	Hungary
10 points	Ireland
8 points	Iceland
7 points	Estonia
6 points	Sweden
5 points	Azerbaijan
4 points	France
3 points	Italy
2 points	Serbia
1 point	Austria

Jury points awarded by Finland (Final)
Score	Country
12 points	Hungary
10 points	Azerbaijan
8 points	Ireland
7 points	Serbia
6 points	Iceland
5 points	Austria
4 points	Italy
3 points	France
2 points	Lithuania
1 point	Georgia
