= Linda Lampenius discography =

Works by Finnish violinist

Linda Lampenius
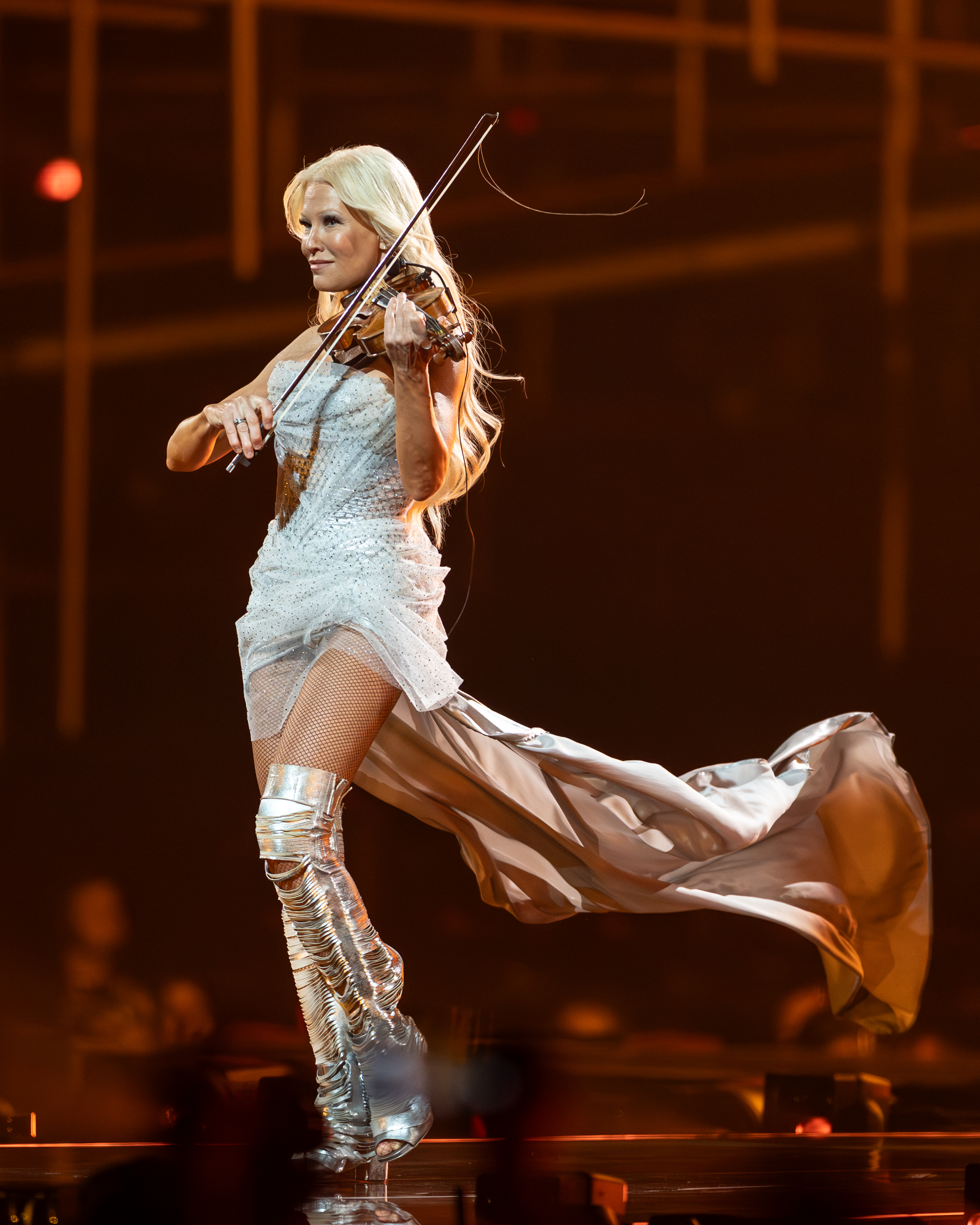
- Lampenius performing at the Eurovision Song Contest 2026

Background information
- Born: 26 February 1970 (age 56)
- Origin: Helsinki, Finland
- Genres: Classical, rock, pop, folk, celtic
- Instrument: Violin
- Years active: 1978–present
- Label: Linda Lampenius Productions

This is a list of albums, singles and DVDs, in which the Finnish violinist Linda Lampenius (previously known internationally by her stage name Linda Brava) is featured. The list excludes recordings Lampenius has done as an orchestral and chamber musician with various Finnish orchestras and chamber ensembles in the 1970s, 1980s and 1990s.

== Albums ==
=== Soloist ===
- Linda Lampenius (Audiovox Records, 1997) - Finnish Top Album Chart: 8
- Linda Brava (EMI Classics, 1999) - UK Classical Chart: 14; Swedish Classical Chart: 6
- Nordic Light (Ladybird, 2005/re-released 2008) - Swedish Top Album Chart: 12
- Angels (Linda Lampenius Productions, 2010) - Swedish Classical Chart: 5 (2010); Swedish Classical Chart: 3 (2011)

=== Guest ===
- Paul Oxley's Unit - The Magic (Sony Music Entertainment Finland, 1996) (violin)
- Osmo's Cosmos - Just For You (Edel Records Finland, 2003) (guest violin soloist)
- Smalare Än Thord - * World Hockey Party (Sweden's Official Hockey CD 2004/2005) (Bam, 2004) (guest violin soloist) - Swedish Top Album Chart: 10
- Anúna - Celtic Origins (Elevation, 2007) (guest violin soloist) - Nielsen SoundScan - World Music: 1
- Celine Dion - Taking Chances (Sony, 2007) (strings) - U.S. Billboard 200: 3
- Tiny Harvest - It Hasn't Been One Normal Day (Universal Music, 2007) (violin)
- Sofia Källgren - Cinema Paradiso (One Voice AB, 2008) (guest violin soloist)
- Carola - Christmas in Bethlehem (X5 Music Group, 2009) (guest violin soloist) - Swedish Top Album Chart: 4
- Yana Mangi - Earth Shadow (Transubstans Records, 2010) (violin)
- Saara Aalto - Enkeleitä – Angels (Yume Records, 2011) (guest violin soloist)
- Nanne - My Rock Favorites (Lionheart Music, 2011) (guest violin soloist) - Swedish Top Album Chart: 4
- Anúna - Illuminations (Danu, 2014) (guest violin soloist)

== Singles ==
=== Soloist ===
- Violator/Toccata and Fugue in D minor (Audiovox Records, 1996)
- Ave Maria/Salut d'Amour (EMI Classics, 1999)
- Your Song (featuring Gentlemen) (Love No Limit Recordings, 2011)
- "Liekinheitin" (with Pete Parkkonen) (2026)

=== Guest ===
- Magnus Bäcklund - Burn (UNI, 2007) (featured artist) - Swedish Top Singles Chart: 4
- Emilia de Poret - Pick Me Up (UNI, 2008) (strings) - Swedish Top Singles Chart: 1

== DVDs ==
- Various Artists - Classic FM [2003] DVD (BMG Music Programming, 2003) ("Ave Maria" music video)
- Osmo's Cosmos - 70's Rock'n'Roll Show (Edel Records Finland, 2003) (guest violin soloist)
- Anúna - Celtic Origins (Elevation, 2007) (guest violin soloist)
- Robert Wells - Rhapsody in Rock 1998-2008 (Pan Vision, 2008) (guest violin soloist)
