= Finland in the Eurovision Song Contest 2010 =

- Eurovision Song Contest 2010
- Participating broadcaster: Yleisradio (Yle)
- Country: Finland
- Selection process: Euroviisut 2010
- Selection date: 30 January 2010

Competing entry
- Song: "Työlki ellää"
- Artist: Kuunkuiskaajat
- Songwriters: Timo Kiiskinen

Placement
- Semi-final result: Failed to qualify (11th)

Participation chronology

Finland was represented at the Eurovision Song Contest 2010 with the song "Työlki ellää" written by Timo Kiiskinen, and performed by the duo Kuunkuiskaajat. The Finnish participating broadcaster, Yleisradio (Yle), organised the national final Euroviisut 2010 in order to select the Finnish entry for the contest. 15 entries were selected to compete in the national final, which consisted of three semi-finals and a final, taking place in January 2010. Ten entries ultimately competed in the final on 30 January where votes from the public selected "Työlki ellää" performed by Kuunkuiskaajat as the winner.

Finland was drawn to compete in the first semi-final of the Eurovision Song Contest which took place on 25 May 2010. Performing during the show in position 5, "Työlki ellää" was not announced among the top 10 entries of the first semi-final and therefore did not qualify to compete in the final. It was later revealed that Finland placed eleventh out of the 17 participating countries in the semi-final with 49 points.

== Background ==
Prior to the 2010 contest, Yleisradio (Yle) had participated in the Eurovision Song Contest representing Finland forty-three times since its first entry in 1961. It has won the contest once in 2006 with the song "Hard Rock Hallelujah" performed by Lordi. In 2009, "Lose Control" performed by Waldo's People managed to qualify Finland to the final but placed last in twenty-fifth.

As part of its duties as participating broadcaster, Yle organises the selection of its entry in the Eurovision Song Contest and broadcasts the event in the country. The broadcaster confirmed its intentions to participate at the 2010 contest on 16 June 2009. Yle had selected its entries for the contest through national final competitions that have varied in format over the years. Since 1961, a selection show that was often titled Euroviisukarsinta highlighted that the purpose of the program was to select a song for Eurovision. Along with its participation confirmation, the broadcaster also announced that its entry for the 2010 contest would be selected through the Euroviisut selection show.

== Before Eurovision ==
=== Euroviisut 2010 ===
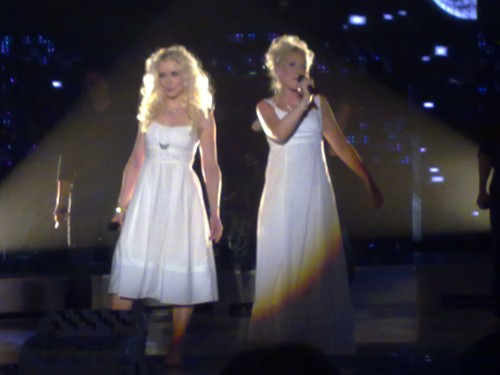
Kuunkuiskaajat at the final of Euroviisut 2010

Euroviisut 2010 was the national final that selected Finland's entry for the Eurovision Song Contest 2010. The competition consisted of four shows that commenced with the first of three semi-finals on 8 January 2010 and concluded with a final on 30 January 2010. The four shows were hosted by Eurovision Song Contest 2007 host Jaana Pelkonen and YleX DJ Mikko Peltola. All shows were broadcast on Yle TV2 and online at yle.fi. The final was also broadcast via radio on Yle Radio Suomi.

==== Format ====
The format of the competition consisted of four shows: three semi-finals and a final. Five songs competed in each semi-final and the top three entries from each semi-final as determined exclusively by a public vote along with a wildcard act selected by a jury from the remaining non-qualifying entries qualified to complete the ten-song lineup in the final. The results in the final were determined exclusively by a public vote. Public voting included the options of telephone and SMS voting.

==== Competing entries ====
Twelve artists, including the winner of the Finnish tango contest Tangomarkkinat in 2009, Amadeus Lundberg, were directly invited by Yle to compete in the national final following consultation with record companies, while an additional three acts were selected through a public online selection. For the online selection, a submission period was opened by Yle which lasted between 16 June 2009 and 31 August 2009. At least one of the writers and the lead singer(s) had to hold Finnish citizenship or live in Finland permanently in order for the entry to qualify to compete. A panel of experts appointed by Yle selected thirty competing entries from the 267 received submissions, which were presented on 1 October 2009 at yle.fi for the public to vote through SMS until 15 October 2009. Among the competing artists was former Finnish Eurovision entrant Geir Rönning who represented Finland in 2005. The twelve invited artists were announced on 30 September 2009, while the three entries that qualified from the online selection and were presented during a televised programme on 16 October 2009.

Online selection – 1–16 October 2009
R/O	Artist	Song	Songwriter(s)	Result
1	Saara Aalto	"Meant to Be"	Saara Aalto	—N/a
2	Markus Ahola	"Kadotaan"	Markus Ahola, Minna Immonen	—N/a
3	AiA	"Ruma"	Nina Tapio, Anna Aittomäki, Hanna-Riikka Siitonen	—N/a
4	Henrik Anttila and Krister Anttila	"Yhtä juhlaa"	Henrik Anttila, Jukka Pylväs, Krister Anttila	—N/a
5	Sonja Bishop	"Why Don't You"	Ann Slangar, Sonja Bishop, Mats Granfors	—N/a
6	Blackbird	"Did I Say That I Loved You"	Jussi Petäjä	—N/a
7	Blackstream	"Divine"	Mårten Svartström	—N/a
8	Saga Bloom	"Love Like This"	Saga Vuorenmaa	—N/a
9	Bääbs	"You Don't Know Tomorrow"	Riku Kärkkäinen, Tommi Forsström	Advanced
10	Camilla Petra	"Your World Is Still Waiting for Me"	Kim Fredenberg	—N/a
11	Captain Cougar	"Too Late"	Jussi Petäjä	—N/a
12	Daisy Jack	"Fridays"	Ben Bergman, Kristin Siegfrids, Fredrik Furu, Marcus Granfors	—N/a
13	Marcus Granfors	"Always"	Marcus Granfors, Mikko Tamminen	—N/a
14	Janne Hurme	"Not Even on Sundays"	Janne Hurme	—N/a
15	Sofia Järnström	"Miss Magic"	Niklas Mansner, Sofia Järnström, Kimmo Pekari	—N/a
16	Pauliina Kumpulainen	"Niin kävi taas"	Teppo Seppänen, Tomi Kankainen	—N/a
17	Jukka Kuoppamäki	"Ystävät!"	Jukka Kuoppamäki	—N/a
18	Netta	"Stronger"	Netta Eklund, Patrick Linman	—N/a
19	Linn	"Fatal Moment"	Sebastian Holmgård, Linn Nygård	Advanced
20	Paul Oxley	"Hope"	Paul Oxley, Christer Rönnholm	—N/a
21	Janne Raappana	"Elina"	Jussi Hakulinen	—N/a
22	Rock'n Roll Sensation	"Listen to the Radio"	Eppu Uutinen, Erno Valovirta	—N/a
23	Geir Rönning	"I Hate Myself for Loving You"	Geir Rönning, Sayit Dölen, Tom Diekmeier	—N/a
24	Laura Sippola and Tuki	"Morse for Nature"	Laura Sippola	—N/a
25	Sister Twister	"Love at the First Sight"	Elin Blom, Jonas Olsson	Advanced
26	Juhana Suninen	"Vastaa!"	Juhana Suninen, Daniela Persson	—N/a
27	Sanna-Mari Titov	"Tunnustuksen tapaisia sanoja"	Nalle Ahlstedt, Sana Mustonen	—N/a
28	Roni Tran	"Star Power"	Will Rappaport, Henri Lanz, Roni Tran	—N/a
29	U.O.M.A.	"Kaupunki"	Antti Seppä	—N/a
30	Villieläin	"Ei minua"	Jani Hölli, Piritta Vartola	—N/a

Artist	Song	Songwriter(s)
Amadeus	"Anastacia"	Risto Asikainen, Ilkka Vainio
Antti Kleemola	"Sun puolella"	Antti Kleemola, Mikko Karjalainen
Bääbs	"You Don't Know Tomorrow"	Riku Kärkkäinen, Tommi Forsström
Boys of the Band (BOB)	"America (I Think I Love You)"	Boys of the Band, Kimmo Blom
Eläkeläiset	"Hulluna humpasta"	Kristian Voutilainen, Onni Waris
Heli Kajo	"Annankadun kulmassa"	Heli Kajo
Kuunkuiskaajat	"Työlki ellää"	Timo Kiiskinen
Linn	"Fatal Moment"	Sebastian Holmgård, Linn Nygård
Maria Lund	"Sydän ymmärtää"	Valtteri Tynkkynen, Maria Lund, Heikki Salo
Monday	"Play"	Tuomas "Gary" Keskinen, Salla Lehtinen
Nina Lassander	"Cider Hill"	Janne Hyöty, Paul Oxley
Osmo Ikonen	"Heaven or Hell"	Osmo Ikonen
Pentti Hietanen	"Il mondo è qui"	Lasse Heikkilä, Petri Kaivanto, Stefano de Sando
Sister Twister	"Love at the First Sight"	Elin Blom, Jonas Olsson
Veeti Kallio	"Kerro mulle rakkaudesta"	Veeti Kallio, Pekka Ruuska

==== Semi-finals ====
The three semi-final shows took place on 8, 15 and 22 January 2010 at the Tohloppi Studios in Tampere. The top three from the five competing entries in each semi-final qualified to the final based on the results from the public vote. "Sydän ymmärtää" performed by Maria Lund was awarded the jury wildcard and also qualified to the final.

Semi-final 1 – 8 January 2010
R/O	Artist	Song	Result
1	Amadeus	"Anastacia"	Advanced
2	Nina Lassander	"Cider Hill"	Advanced
3	Bääbs	"You Don't Know Tomorrow"	—N/a
4	Boys of the Band (BOB)	"America (I Think I Love You)"	—N/a
5	Pentti Hietanen	"Il mondo è qui"	Advanced

Semi-final 2 – 15 January 2010
R/O	Artist	Song	Result
1	Monday	"Play"	—N/a
2	Antti Kleemola	"Sun puolella"	Advanced
3	Heli Kajo	"Annankadun kulmassa"	Advanced
4	Sister Twister	"Love at the First Sight"	Advanced
5	Veeti Kallio	"Kerro mulle rakkaudesta"	—N/a

Semi-final 3 – 22 January 2010
R/O	Artist	Song	Result
1	Maria Lund	"Sydän ymmärtää"	Wildcard
2	Osmo Ikonen	"Heaven or Hell"	—N/a
3	Kuunkuiskaajat	"Työlki ellää"	Advanced
4	Linn	"Fatal Moment"	Advanced
5	Eläkeläiset	"Hulluna humpasta"	Advanced

==== Final ====
The final took place on 30 January 2010 at the Tampere Exhibition and Sports Centre in Tampere where the ten entries that qualified from the preceding three semi-finals competed. The winner was selected over two rounds of public televoting. In the first round, the top three from the ten competing entries qualified to the second round, the superfinal. In the superfinal, "Työlki ellää" performed by Kuunkuiskaajat was selected as the winner. The song was written in Finnish Karelian. (Note: Karelian is nowadays considered a separate language.) A total of 233,683 votes were cast during the show: 119,142 in the final and 114,541 in the superfinal. In addition to the performances of the competing entries, the interval act featured Mikko Leppilampi and Norwegian Eurovision Song Contest 2009 winner Alexander Rybak.

Final – 30 January 2010
R/O	Artist	Song	Televote	Place
1	Maria Lund	"Sydän ymmärtää"	6,663	9
2	Antti Kleemola	"Sun puolella"	3,907	10
3	Linn	"Fatal Moment"	7,135	7
4	Pentti Hietanen	"Il mondo è qui"	6,671	8
5	Heli Kajo	"Annankadun kulmassa"	11,443	6
6	Nina Lassander	"Cider Hill"	17,312	3
7	Amadeus	"Anastacia"	12,250	5
8	Sister Twister	"Love at the First Sight"	15,377	4
9	Eläkeläiset	"Hulluna humpasta"	20,051	1
10	Kuunkuiskaajat	"Työlki ellää"	18,333	2

Superfinal – 30 January 2010
R/O	Artist	Song	Televote	Place
1	Nina Lassander	"Cider Hill"	43,282	2
2	Eläkeläiset	"Hulluna humpasta"	23,120	3
3	Kuunkuiskaajat	"Työlki ellää"	48,139	1

==== Ratings ====
Viewing figures by show
Show	Date	Viewers	Ref.
Semi-final 1	8 January 2010	N/A (Note: Less than 600,000)	
Semi-final 2	15 January 2010	N/A	
Semi-final 3	22 January 2010	769,000	
Final	30 January 2010	995,000	

=== Promotion ===
Kuunkuiskaajat specifically promoted "Työlki ellää" as the Finnish Eurovision entry on 24 April 2010 by performing during the Eurovision in Concert event which was held at the Lexion venue in Zaanstad, Netherlands on 24 April and hosted by Cornald Maas and Marga Bult.

== At Eurovision ==
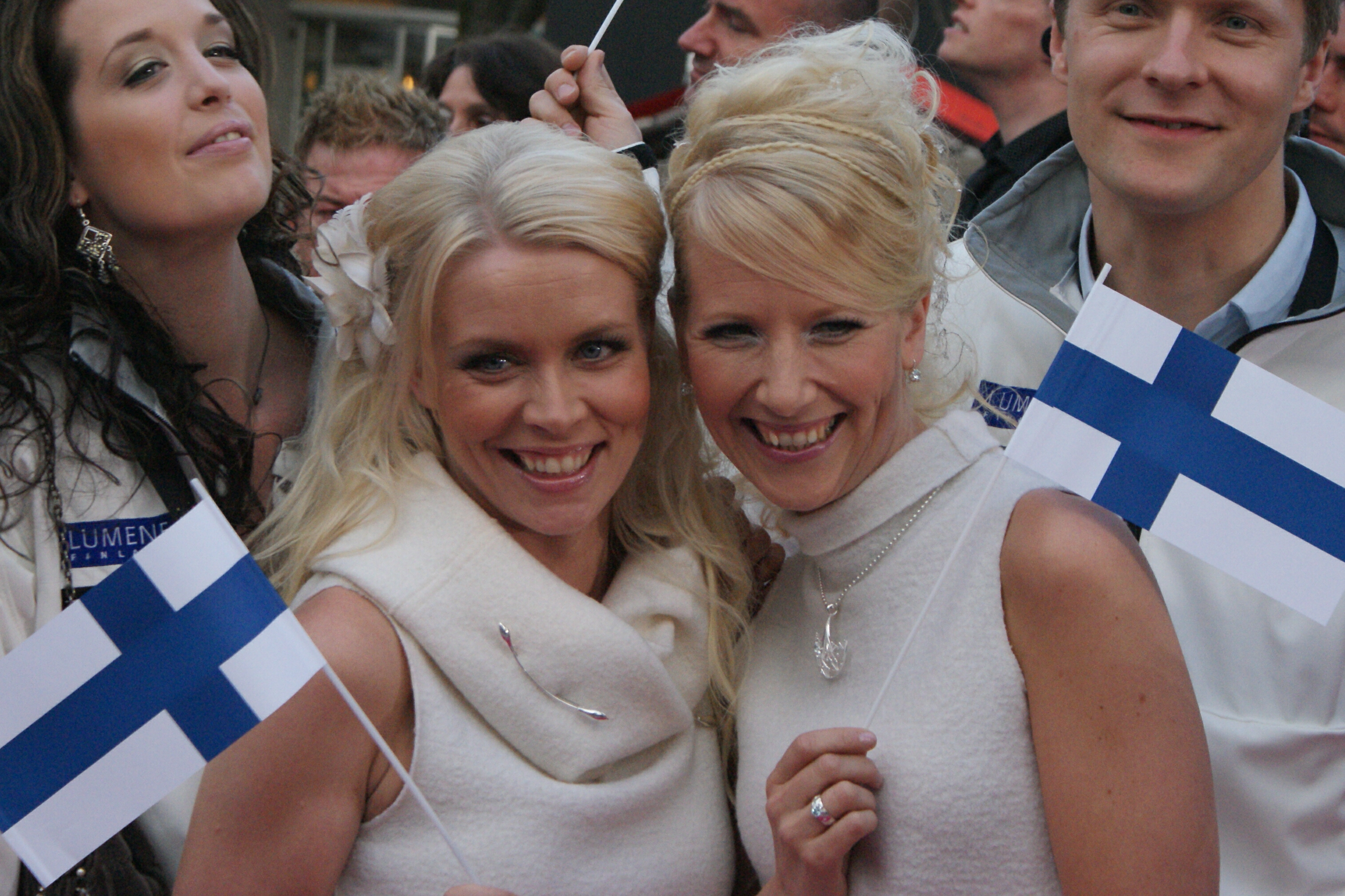
Kuunkuiskaajat at the Eurovision Opening Party in Oslo

According to Eurovision rules, all nations with the exceptions of the host country and the "Big Four" (France, Germany, Spain and the United Kingdom) were required to qualify from one of two semi-finals in order to compete for the final; the top ten countries from each semi-final progress to the final. The European Broadcasting Union (EBU) split up the competing countries into six different pots based on voting patterns from previous contests, with countries with favourable voting histories put into the same pot. On 7 February 2010, a special allocation draw was held which placed each country into one of the two semi-finals, as well as which half of the show they would perform in. Finland was placed into the first semi-final, to be held on 25 May 2010, and was scheduled to perform in the first half of the show. The running order for the semi-finals was decided through another draw on 23 March 2010 and Finland was set to perform in position 5, following the entry from Slovakia and before the entry from Latvia.

The two semi-finals and the final were televised in Finland on Yle TV2 with commentary in Finnish by Jaana Pelkonen and Asko Murtomäki. The three shows were also broadcast on Yle FST5 with commentary in Swedish by Thomas Larsson as well as via radio with Finnish commentary by Sanna Pirkkalainen and Jorma Hietamäki on Yle Radio Suomi. The Finnish spokesperson, who announced the Finnish votes during the final, was Johanna Pirttilahti.

=== Semi-final ===
Kuunkuiskaajat took part in technical rehearsals on 16 and 20 May, followed by dress rehearsals on 24 and 25 May. This included the jury show on 24 May where the professional juries of each country watched and voted on the competing entries.

The Finnish performance featured the members of Kuunkuiskaajat performing in white dresses joined by two dancers/backing vocalists and a violinist wearing beige outfits. Member Susan Aho also played the accordion with an illuminated stone in front of her. Kuunkuiskaajat and the backing performers performed a dance routine together on stage which were in blue and white colours. The performance also featured the use of a wind machine. The two dancers/backing vocalists that joined Kuunkuiskaajat on stage were Aki Eronen and Jukka Tarvainen, while the violinist was Maria Baric.

At the end of the show, Finland was not announced among the top 10 entries in the first semi-final and therefore failed to qualify to compete in the final. It was later revealed that Finland placed eleventh in the semi-final, receiving a total of 49 points.

=== Voting ===
Voting during the three shows consisted of 50 percent public televoting and 50 percent from a jury deliberation. The jury consisted of five music industry professionals who were citizens of the country they represent. This jury was asked to judge each contestant based on: vocal capacity; the stage performance; the song's composition and originality; and the overall impression by the act. In addition, no member of a national jury could be related in any way to any of the competing acts in such a way that they cannot vote impartially and independently.

Following the release of the full split voting by the EBU after the conclusion of the competition, it was revealed that Finland had placed sixth with the public televote and fifteenth with the jury vote in the first semi-final. In the public vote, Finland scored 69 points, while with the jury vote, Finland scored 37 points.

Below is a breakdown of points awarded to Finland and awarded by Finland in the first semi-final and grand final of the contest. The nation awarded its 12 points to Estonia in the semi-final and to Germany in the final of the contest.

==== Points awarded to Finland ====
Points awarded to Finland (Semi-final 1)
Score	Country
12 points	
10 points	Estonia
8 points	
7 points	Belarus; Belgium
6 points	Iceland; Latvia
5 points	
4 points	
3 points	Germany; Russia
2 points	Malta; Slovakia; Spain
1 point	Poland

==== Points awarded by Finland ====
Points awarded by Finland (Semi-final 1)
Score	Country
12 points	Estonia
10 points	Belgium
8 points	Greece
7 points	Iceland
6 points	Portugal
5 points	Latvia
4 points	Albania
3 points	Russia
2 points	Slovakia
1 point	Malta

Points awarded by Finland (Final)
Score	Country
12 points	Germany
10 points	Israel
8 points	France
7 points	Greece
6 points	Belgium
5 points	Iceland
4 points	Spain
3 points	Turkey
2 points	Denmark
1 point	Ireland
