= Icycore =

Italian progressive metal band

Icycore was an Italian progressive metal band. The band notably issued one album on Limb Music.

Following their first demo Altered Feelings, Icycore recorded what would become their album Wetwired. For several years, the album was shelved rather than released. Bassist Lisa Oliveiro played in Eldritch for a while, but left Eldritch in the first half of 2004 to concentrate on Icycore.

In the same year, their debut album Wetwired was released on Limb Music. Rock Hard only scored the album 6 out of 10. DPRP was marginally more positive with 6.5 points. The album contained "some great musicianship" as well as "intelligent" music, and was not a copy of existing bands, but featured "their own stamp". The band did however lack memorable hooks, and "not everything sticks in the memory". Powermetal.de concurred that Icycore "don't sound like a second-rate imitation at all, but rather manage to create some truly distinctive moments". Contrary to DPRP, the reviewer stated that Wetwired was "brimming" with hooks, "some incredibly catchy earworms". There were other "obvious weaknesses", most noteworthily a lack of variety. Vampster branded Icycore as "typical Italian prog metal, which – like all its peers – is technically very convincing and highly sophisticated, but musically rather bland and soulless". The reviewer complained about "a noticeable uniformity between the individual songs, almost all of which follow a similar formula, move at the same tempo, and are characterized by the absence of any real hooks".

Denmark's Heavymetal.dk only gave 5 out of 10, criticizing their "chaotic universe of ideas" and especially lambasting the synth sound. This synth "destroyed metal" in a "shameful" manner, and the band should "stop that synth shit". Norway's Scream Magazine and Exact both scored the album 4 out of 6. Scream called the band an "interesting acquaintance", whereas Exact called Wetwired a "very good debut album". With comparisons being drawn to early Dream Theater and Queensrÿche, Exact wrote, Icycore were "much more exciting and complex" than Eldritch.

In 2008, a second album followed, Evol, on Underground Symphony.
