= Blood – Fury – Domination =

2017 metal album

Studio album by Arthemis
- Released: 7 April 2017
- Genre: Power metal, heavy metal
- Length: 43:41
- Label: Scarlet Records

Arthemis chronology
We Fight (2012)	Blood – Fury – Domination (2017)

Blood – Fury – Domination is the eighth studio album by the Italian power metal band Arthemis, released in 2017 on Scarlet Records.

Arthemis had released on Scarlet Records previously, but not since 2008's Black Society. By 2017 they had re-signed with the Italian label. The album was mixed by Simone Mularoni.

== Reception ==
Metal Hammer Italia gave the album a high rating, 86 out of 100. The reviewer praised it as "a sublimely arrogant album, brimming with technique, anger, sweat, blood, incisive lyrics, unpredictable messages, and astutely chosen words". Its intensity was "like a jab from Conor McGregor in the teeth". Similarly, Heavymetal.dk rated the album as a 9.

Dead Rhetoric analysed Arthemis as a band with emphasis on hooks and radio-friendly song lengths, at least below 5 minutes. Stylistically they varied from being "very Euro-metal oriented with occasional squeals and effects at home to most modern rock listeners" to venturing into "semi-thrash" at times, harboring an "almost Megadeth thrash-like intensity". Though "Arthemis probably will never be an upper echelon act in this fairly sizeable power genre", the band would find its fans and received a rating of 7.5 out of 10.

Metal.de, on the other hand, were lukewarm with their rating being 6 out of 10. While the opening track was "top-notch power metal with a few thrashy heavy metal moments", the second song "saps the album's momentum and gets lost in a meaningless song structure, not to mention the song's unnecessary ending". There were other highlights, but all in all, Blood – Fury – Domination was "an average album". The production was good and the sound powerful, however.

== Track listing ==
No.	Title	Length
1.	"Undead"	3:51
2.	"Black Sun"	3:37
3.	"Blood Red Sky"	4:33
4.	"Blistering Eyes"	3:31
5.	"If I Fall"	4:14
6.	"Warcry"	4:49
7.	"Into the Arena"	3:58
8.	"Dark Fire"	4:06
9.	"Firetribe"	4:13
10.	"Inner-Fury Unleashed"	3:34
11.	"Rituals"	3:15
