= Cardiant =

Finnish power metal band

- Origin: Hämeenlinna, Finland
- Genres: Power metal
- Years active: 2000–present
- Label: Marquee/Avalon
- Members: Erik Karhatsu; Antti Hänninen; Mikko Mänttäri; Marko Lindroos; Lauri Hänninen
- Past members: Janne Saksa
- Website: cardiant.net

Cardiant is a Finnish power metal band. It was established in city of Hämeenlinna in 2000, but most of band members have been replaced and the current assembly has been working since 2008. In the early years, the band recorded several demos until it signed a contract with the record company Underground Symphony. The first album, Midday Moon, was released in 2005, but the record company did not release it in Europe. However, another record company, Marquee/Avalon, released it in Japan.

Cardiant went through several changes of lead vocals until a drop-out idols competitor Erik Karhatsu was chosen as a new lead singer in 2008. The next year, the band released its second record Tomorrow’s Daylight. As the previous record, this was also released only in Japan, and elsewhere Cardiant had to settle for selling it from their own online store. The band released their first music video Stars upon your life in 2010. Later in the same year, the band was selected to the semi-finals of Finnish national selection for Eurovision 2011 as one of three entries voted from a group of 277 participants with the song Rapture in Time. In January 2011, Cardiant qualified for the Eurovision Finnish national finals on 12 February.

== Members ==
- Erik Karhatsu - lead vocalist
- Outi Jokinen - lead and back vocalist
- Antti Hänninen - guitar
- Mikko Mänttäri - bass guitar
- Marko Lindroos - keyboard
- Lauri Hänninen - drums

== Discography ==
=== Albums ===
- Midday Moon (2005)
- Tomorrow's Daylight (2009)
- Verge (2013)
- Mirrors (2017)
