= Kuunkuiskaajat =

Finnish folk music duo

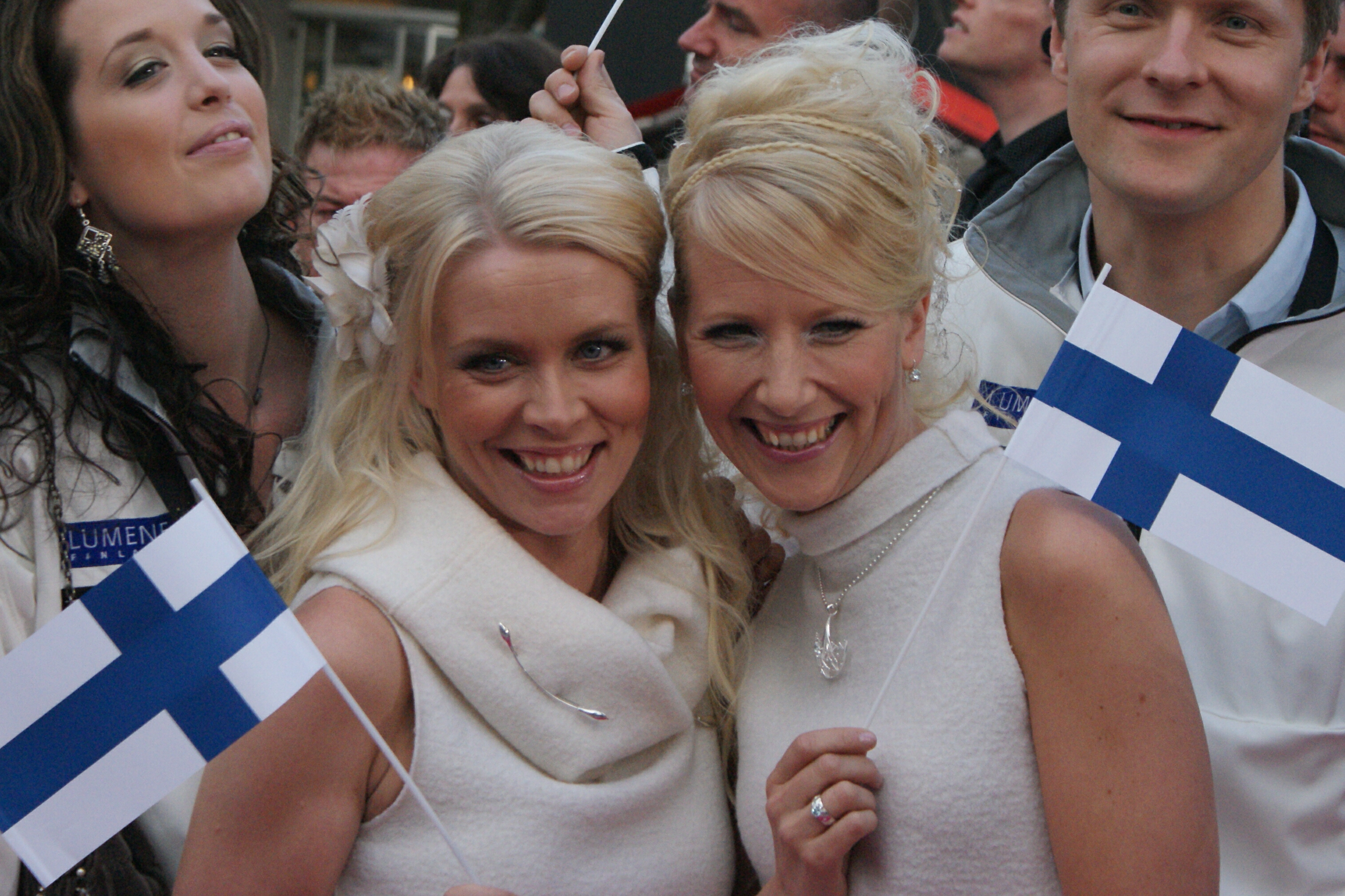
Kuunkuiskaajat at the Eurovision Opening Party in Oslo

Kuunkuiskaajat (/kuːn.kuˈi skaːjat/; "Moonwhisperers") was a Finnish female folk duo made up of Värttinä members Susan Aho and Johanna Virtanen, that represented Finland in the Eurovision Song Contest 2010 with the song "Työlki ellää". The duo won the Finnish national final, Euroviisut 2010, with 42% of the "super final" vote.

"Työlki ellää" did not qualify for the final, placing 11th in the first Semi-Final on 25 May 2010, missing the cut by only three points.

== Discography ==
- Kuunkuiskaajat (2009)
- Revitty rakkaus (2016)

Preceded by Waldo's People with "Lose Control"	Finland in the Eurovision Song Contest; 2010	Succeeded by Paradise Oskar with "Da Da Dam"
