= Golden Dawn (album) =

Studio album by Arthemis
- Released: 2003
- Genre: Power metal
- Length: 41:53
- Label: Underground Symphony

Arthemis chronology
The Damned Ship (2001)	Golden Dawn (2003)	Back from the Heat (2005)

Golden Dawn is the third studio album by the Italian power metal band Arthemis, released in 2003 on Underground Symphony.

The cover artwork was by Jonathon Earl Bowser, who also made a cover for Nemesis in the same year. The European version of Golden Dawn included a Heavy Load cover, "Might for Right".

Vampster had been negative towards the previous album, and found Golden Dawn to be "another boring tale", the reviewer being tempted "to simply copy the old review and just give it a new title". Golden Dawn was well produced and was "technically solid", but "the band fails to leave a lasting impression" with songs failing "to ignite any real enthusiasm". The band was "predictable" ad not able "to move into the next higher league". Rock Hard were lukewarm too with their rating being 6.5 out of 10.

Norway's Scream Magazine stated that the previous album was very good, but that Golden Dawn not quite matched its predecessor. The album had several flaws, but was still "good", rated as 4 out of 6, and Arthemis were vying for a place among "the elite of Italian metal bands".

== Track listing ==
No.	Title	Length
1.	"Fire Set Us Free"	4:24
2.	"Black Rain"	4:04
3.	"The End of the World"	4:18
4.	"The Traveller"	4:13
5.	"Master of the Souls"	4:53
6.	"Arthemis"	4:14
7.	"The Axe Is Coming"	4:11
8.	"From Hell to Hell"	4:00
9.	"Golden Dawn"	4:21

European bonus track
No.	Title	Length
10.	"Might for Right"	3:15
