= The Damned Ship =

Studio album by Arthemis
- Released: September 2001
- Recorded: 2000
- Studio: New Sin Studio
- Genre: Power metal
- Length: 47:10; 51:56 (Japan)
- Label: Underground Symphony

Arthemis chronology
Church of the Ghost (1999)	The Damned Ship (2001)	Golden Dawn (2003)

The Damned Ship is the second studio album to by the power metal band, Arthemis. It was recorded near the end of 2000, and released in September 2001. It is the very first album to feature Alessio Garavello as the band's vocalist.

At the end of 2000, the band entered in New Sin Studio to record their second album titled The Damned Ship for the Underground Symphony label with the co-production of Pat Scalabrino of Pick Up Records.

== Reception ==
Vampster derided the album as "The Keeper of The 7 Keys Part 815", stating that "The Damned Ship drifts somewhere in the well-trodden waters of Helloween and Gamma Ray". As a musical copy, it "simply lacks soul!", and it was difficult sitting through the whole album. Powermetal.de however wrote that Arthemis had "musical prowess". Whereas "the parallels to Helloween are undeniable", The Damned Ship was heavy and contained "some incredibly powerful riffs" in addition to classical elements. The album should then "definitely" be bought by fans of the genre. Though the "sometimes extremely squeaky vocals grate on my nerves", this was not likely to bother the target audience. The reviewer also recommended more variation in tempo.

== Track listing ==
No.	Title	Length
1.	"Quest For Immortality"	7:01
2.	"Voice Of The God"	5:20
3.	"Sun's Temple"	6:09
4.	"Starchild"	5:41
5.	"The Wait"	1:05
6.	"The Night Of The Vampire"	6:45
7.	"Earthquake"	4:20
8.	"Noble Sword"	5:07
9.	"The Damned Ship"	5:42

Japanese Bonus Track
No.	Title	Length
9.	"Twilight"	4:46
