= The Divine Cage =

Studio album by Concept
- Released: February 4, 2005
- Recorded: May–June 2004 Cromas Studios, New Sin Studios
- Genres: progressive metal, power metal
- Length: 61:36
- Label: Underground Symphony

Concept chronology
Reason and Truth (2003)	The Divine Cage (2005)

The Divine Cage is the second studio album by the Italian progressive power metal band Concept. The Japanese edition (including bonus) was published by the label Soundholic.

== Track listing ==
1. New Perspectives – 3:49
2. Faithless Truth – 5:46
3. Don't Let Me Die – 4:12
4. My Cage – 5:17
5. Out of Fashion – 3:19
6. A Fate Worse Than Death (of Reason) – 8:33
7. Changeover – 4:03
8. Catching Dreams (Out of The Cage) – 5:26
9. Lost In A Sigh – 4:38
10. Under My Care – 4:59
11. My Divine Embrace – 5:29
- bonus: Forget Me! (Japan) – 6:05

== Personnel ==
- Mariano Croce - guitars
- Andrea Mastroianni - keyboards
- Gianni Carcione - lead vocals
- Andrea Arcangeli - bass
- David Folchitto - drums
