= My Name Will Live On =

Studio album by Doomsword
- Released: 2007
- Genre: Heavy metal, epic doom metal
- Length: 54:51
- Label: Dragonheart Records

Doomsword chronology
Let Battle Commence (2003)	My Name Will Live On (2007)

My Name Will Live On is the fourth album by Italian heavy metal band Doomsword, released in 2007. The album cover art is Vercingetorix Surrenders to Caesar, by Lionel Royer used with permission.

== Track listing ==
#	Title	Length
1.	Death of Ferdia	7:24
2.	Gergovia	5:58
3.	Days of High Adventure	4:29
4.	Steel of My Axe	4:08
5.	Claidheamh Solais (Sword of Light)	6:44
6.	Thundercult	5:19
7.	Luni	4:53
8.	Once Glorious	8:22
9.	The Great Horn	7:34
