= Between Daylight and Pain =

Studio album by Holy Knights
- Released: June 13, 2012 (Japan); August 28, 2012 (worldwide)
- Recorded: February–March 2012 at Dabliurec Studio Recording, Palermo
- Genre: Symphonic power metal
- Length: 41:53
- Label: Rubicon Music; Scarlet Records

Holy Knights chronology
A Gate Through the Past (2002)	Between Daylight and Pain (2012)

Between Daylight and Pain is the second full-length album by the Italian symphonic power metal band Holy Knights. It was first released in Japan on June 13, 2012 via Rubicon Music and re-released by Scarlet Records worldwide on August 28.

== Track listing ==
All tracks are written by Dario Di Matteo and Simone Campione.

No.	Title	Length
1.	"Mistery"	5:10
2.	"Frozen Paradise"	5:38
3.	"Beyond the Mist"	5:40
4.	"11 September"	5:01
5.	"Glass Room"	5:18
6.	"Wasted Time"	4:50
7.	"Awake"	4:15
8.	"The Turning to the Madness"	6:01
9.	"Resolution" (Romantic Mode cover; Japanese edition bonus track)	4:58
Total length:		46:51

== Background and production ==
In 2002 Holy Knights released their début album, A Gate Through the Past, and experienced departure of the guitarists Danny Merthon and Federico Madonia, who were replaced by Simone Campione. The singer Dario Di Matteo and the bassist, Vincenzo Noto built Raven Studio to take care of pre-production of the second album. However, the band soon decided to take a break to concentrate on their other bands. The hiatus lasted until 2010, when Di Matteo, Campione and the drummer Claudio Florio reunited the band to finish the album. In February 2012, Holy Knights entered the Dabliurec Studio Recording in Palermo and finished the following month. In March, the band signed a contract with Rubicon Music for a Japanese release, followed by an agreement with Scarlet Records in July.

== Music ==
Between Daylight and Pain, like the début, is a melodies-driven album with prominent orchestrations and choruses, in the vein of other Italian symphonic power metal bands, such as Rhapsody of Fire; Di Matteo's vocals have been compared to that of Fabio Lione. Compared to the previous album, however, it is heavier and contains progressive elements, such as tempo changes, segues and interludes. Lyrically, the album is also a departure from the themes of a medieval fantasy, characterizing the predecessor. Di Matteo described the songs as his own introspection, dedicated to the everyday struggles and other personal issues that have arisen while the band was on hiatus.

== Credits ==
- Dario Di Matteo – vocals, orchestral arrangements
- Simone Campione – bass, guitars, orchestral arrangements
- Claudio Florio – drums
