= Holy Knights =

Italian symphonic power metal band

- Origin: Palermo, Italy
- Genres: Symphonic power metal
- Years active: 1998–2002, 2010–present
- Labels: Underground Symphony, Scarlet
- Members: Dario Di Matteo; Claudio Florio; Simone Campione

Holy Knights is a symphonic power metal band from Palermo, Italy, formed in 1998. They recorded their first demo, Gate Through the Past, in 1999. Shortly after releasing their début album, A Gate Through the Past through Underground Symphony, the band was put on hiatus, which lasted until 2010. In 2012, the second album, Between Daylight and Pain, was released by Scarlet Records.

== Biography ==
Holy Knights was formed in November 1998 by the vocalist Dario Di Matteo, and the drummer Claudio Florio. After several changes, the line-up was complete with Salvatore Graziano and Ezio Montalto on guitars and Nico Rose on bass. In December 1999, the band entered Studio Blu in Palermo to record their first demo, Gate Through the Past, which was sent to various magazines the following February, getting positive reviews. Meanwhile, another change in line-up occurred, with Montalto and Rose being replaced by Federico Madonia and Vincenzo Noto respectively. Having received a few contract offers, Holy Knights signed a two-album deal with Underground Symphony in April 2000.

In early November 2000, the band entered the Zenith Recording studio in Lucca to record their début album, A Gate Through the Past, finishing in December. It was released in January 2002 by Tokuma in Japan, followed by the worldwide release via Underground Symphony in June. The album was critically acclaimed. In order to appeal to the international audience Di Matteo, Graziano, Noto and Florio used pseudonyms of Mark Raven, Danny Merthon, Syl Raven and Claus Jorgen respectively. On August 12, the band performed live for the first time at the Agglutination Metal Festival in Chiaromonte. The same year, Holy Knights recorded two cover songs for the planned Heavy Load and Sword tribute albums that were, however, never released. The band became a quartet due to another change in line-up: Florio left, while Madonia was replaced with Simone Campione.

Work on the second album began in 2002 already; Di Matteo and Noto built Raven Studio to take care of pre-production. However, the band members eventually decided to concentrate on their other bands (Thy Majestie, Trinakrius and Crimson Wind), effectively putting Holy Knights on hiatus. In 2010, Di Matteo, Noto and Florio agreed to re-unite the band and finish the second album. Recording took place in February - March 2012 at Dabliurec Studio Recording in Palermo. In March, Holy Knights signed a contract with Rubicon Music for a Japanese release, followed by a deal with Scarlet Records in July.

== Music ==
Stylistically, Holy Knights is evocative of many fellow Italian symphonic power metal bands, often being compared to Rhapsody of Fire. The band frequently employs strong orchestrations and soaring choruses; many songs feature prominent double bass drumming and guitar solos. However, while the début album was strongly influenced by the neoclassical and baroque music, resulting in marked reliance on synthesizers, the follow-up is heavier and contains many progressive elements. Lyrically, there was a progression as well, from the theme of a medieval fantasy to that of an introspection.

== Discography ==
=== Demo ===
- Gate Through the Past (1999)

=== Albums ===
- A Gate Through the Past (2002)
- Between Daylight and Pain (2012)

== Members ==
Current

- Claudio Florio – drums (1998–present)
- Dario Di Matteo – vocals, keyboards, orchestration (1998–present)
- Simone Campione – guitars (2002; 2010–present), bass, orchestration (2012–present)

Former

- Nico Rose – bass (1998–1999)
- Ezio Montalto – guitars (1998–1999)
- Salvatore Graziano – guitars (1998–2002)
- Federico Madonia – guitars (1999–2002)
- Vincenzo Noto – bass (1999–2002)

Timeline
