= Signmark (album) =

2006 album by Signmark

Signmark is the first album from Signmark, a deaf Finnish rapper. Released in 2006, the album was the first hip-hop DVD that was written in a sign language.

== Track listing ==
1. "Tuu viittoo"
2. "Nyt on aika juhlia"
3. "Kahleet"
4. "Carl Oscar Malm"
5. "Maahan lämpimään"
6. "Meidän elämä"
7. "Our Life"
8. "Sanaliitto"

== See also ==
- Carl Oscar Malm
