= Waldo (musician) =

Finnish Eurodance musician (born 1967)

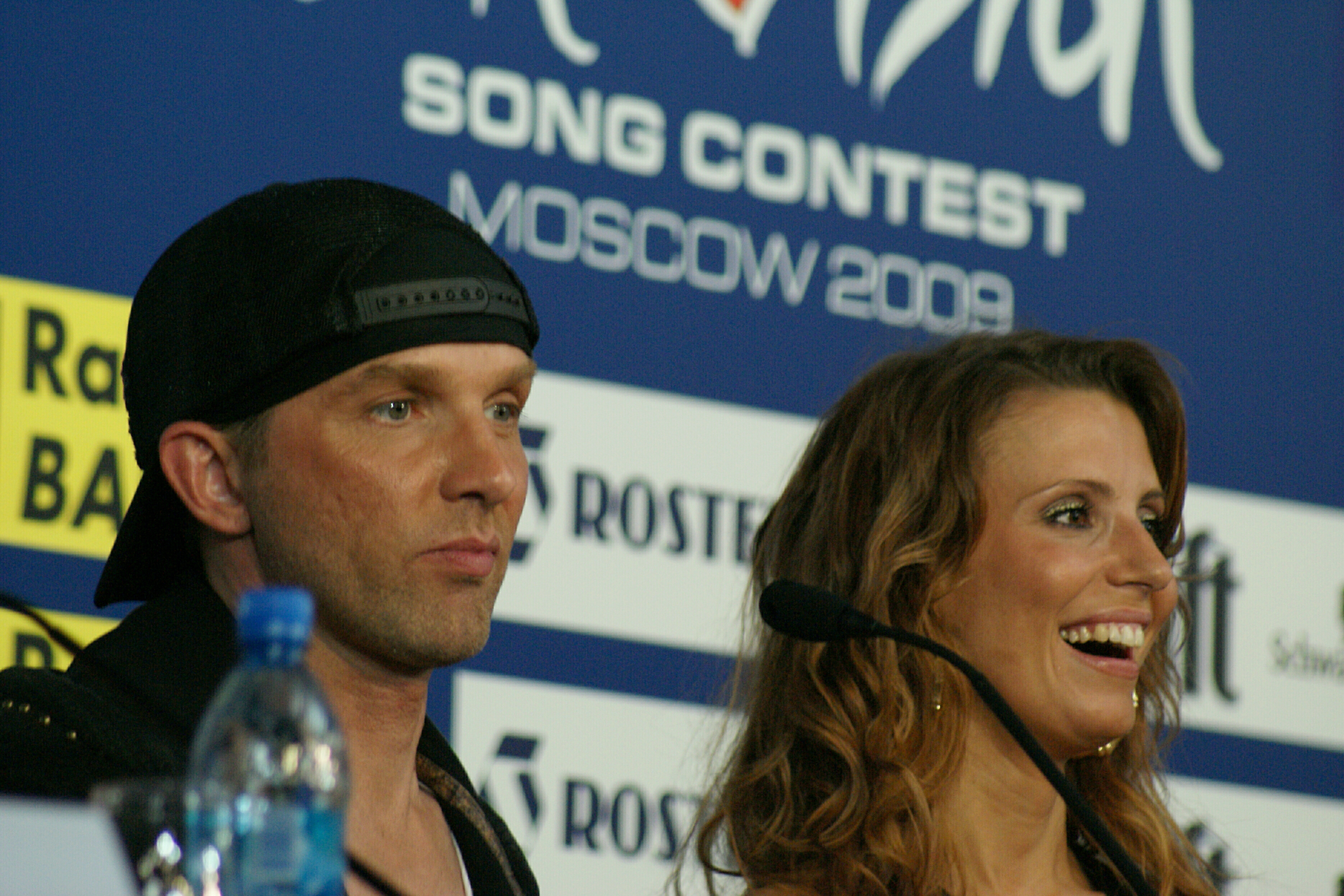

Background information
- Born: Marko Reijonen; 1967 (age 58–59)
- Origin: Helsinki, Finland
- Genres: Eurodance
- Occupations: Singer, songwriter
- Instrument: Vocal
- Years active: 1995–present
- Label: Blue bubble
- Member of: Waldo's People
- Website: Official site

Waldo (born Marko Reijonen, 1967) is a Finnish Eurodance musician. His solo hits, sung in a Jamaican accent, are "It's About Time" and "Feel So Good" in 1995. The number of sales of the album "It's About Time" was certified as gold record in Finland in 1996. Waldo has also written songs for different artists such as Christian Forss.

After 1998 Waldo has been a lead singer and songwriter of his band Waldo's People. They represented Finland in the Eurovision Song Contest in 2009 in Moscow, Russia with Lose Control. The group won qualification to the final as the jury's selected qualifier from the first semi-final. In the final however, they finished 25th and last place, scoring 22 points.

Marko Reijonen owned two clothing shops in Sello and Myyrmanni called Waldo's Clothing.

Nowadays he currently lives in Lepsämä in the municipality of Nurmijärvi.

== Discography ==
=== Albums ===
- It's About Time (Blue Bubble 1995)
- The Riddle (Blue Bubble 1996)

=== Singles ===
- "Forever" (1995)
- "It's About Time" (Remixed 1995)
- "Feel So Good" (Blue Bubble 1995)
- "Be-Bop-a-Lula" (Blue Bubble 1995)
- "Move Your Body" (Blue Bubble 1996)
- "Give Me Your Love" (Blue Bubble 1995)
- "Gimme Gimme" (Blue Bubble 1996)
- "The Look" (Native Dance)
- "Cool Lover" (Blue Bubble 1997)
- "Ooh-la-la" (Blue Bubble 1997)
- "Face The Fact" (Warner 2003)
- "Yellow Sky" (Warner 2003)
