= Signmark =

Finnish deaf rapper (born 1978)

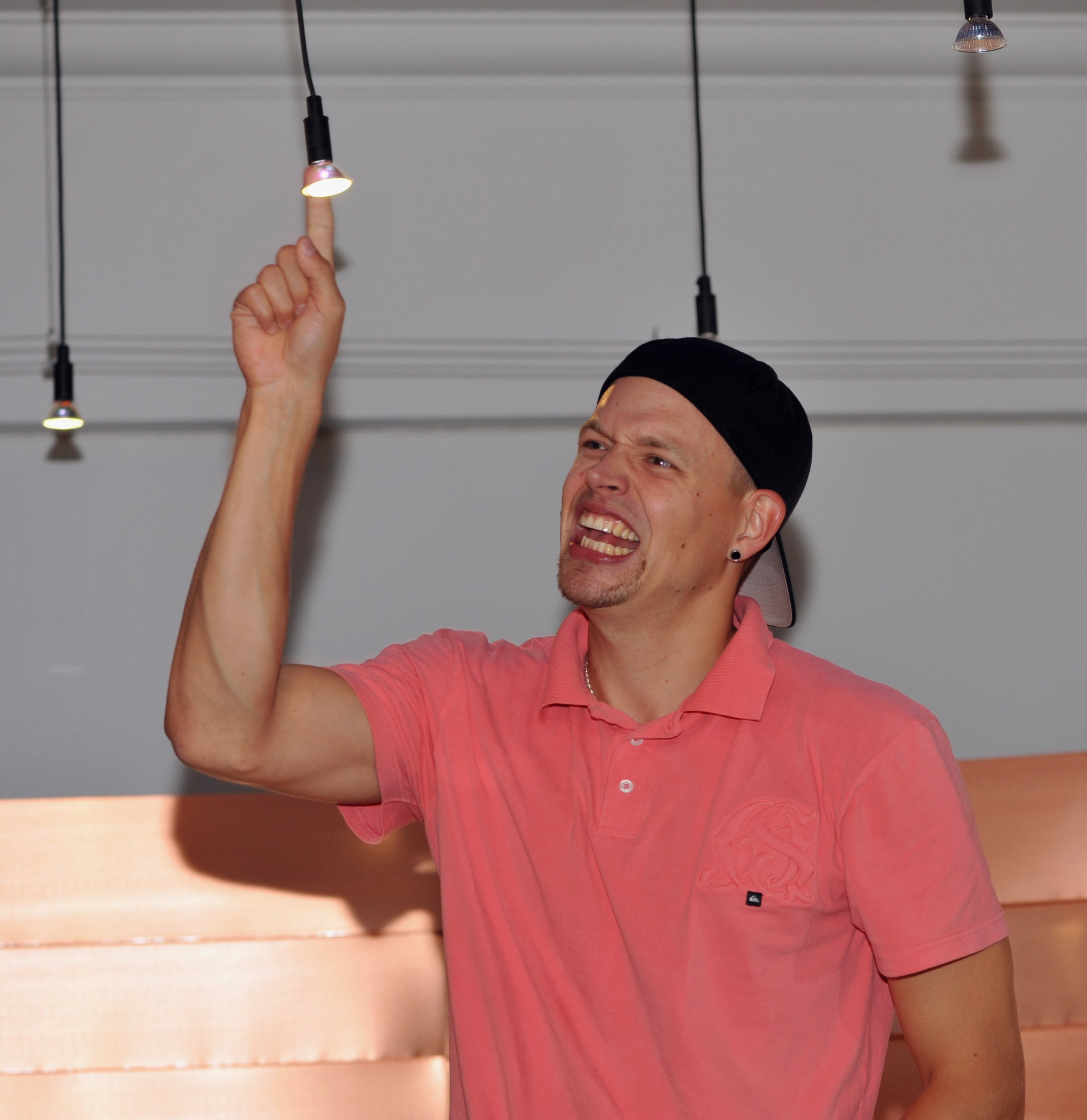
- Signmark performing at the Night of the Arts festival 2009 in Helsinki

Background information
- Born: Marko Vilhelm Vuoriheimo; 26 June 1978 (age 48)
- Origin: Helsinki, Finland
- Genre: Hip hop
- Occupations: Rapper; singer
- Instrument: Vocals
- Years active: 2004–present
- Label: Warner
- Website: www.signmark.biz

Marko Vilhelm Vuoriheimo (born 26 June 1978), professionally known as Signmark, is a deaf Finnish rapper. He describes his music as being party hip-hop that takes a stand. Born into a signing family, Vuoriheimo feels that society should not treat the deaf as disabled people but as a linguistic minority with their own culture and history.

== Biography ==
Signmark was born in Helsinki. Although it was only in 2004 that Vuoriheimo started creating his own music, he has signed poetry and music since he was a child. Christmas carols were some of the first music he learned to sign. When performing, he rhymes signs by ensuring that they have the same types of hand forms and signs. The bass line is important for him, as it helps him follow the music and time his rhymes. His facial expressions reinforce the signs, while improvisation is an essential part of the overall package.

His debut album, Signmark was released on 29 November 2006. The album included the soundtrack on CD and signed music videos on DVD. The album had eight songs on it, many of which dealt with the history, culture and rights of the Finnish signing community. His songs are freeform signing, even though the vocal versions rhyme. His goal is to incorporate more rhyming signed lyrics on his next album.

Signmark was one of the artists competing in Finland's national qualifications to represent it in the 2009 Eurovision Song Contest. Signmark won his qualifying round on 23 January 2009, with Speakerbox, which he performed with Osmo Ikonen, as he received 46.5% of the votes. At the finals on 31 January Signmark placed second behind Waldo's People with 41.2% of the votes.

The original Signmark group split up in May 2009, after which Signmark signed a record deal with Warner Music as a solo artist. He became the first deaf person to sign a recording contract with an international record company.

== Filmography ==
- Marko's Diary (2018)

== Discography ==
- Signmark (2006)
- Breaking the Rules (2010)
- Silent Shout (2014)
- Dream Awake (2018)
