= Let Battle Commence =

Studio album by Doomsword
- Released: 2003
- Genre: Heavy metal, epic doom metal
- Length: 52:37
- Label: Dragonheart Records

Doomsword chronology
Resound the Horn (2002)	Let Battle Commence (2003)	My Name Will Live On (2007)

Let Battle Commence is the third album by Italian heavy metal band Doomsword, released in 2003. In 2019, Metal Hammer ranked it as the 23rd best power metal album of all time.

== Track listing ==
#	Title	Length
1.	Heathen Assault	8:27
2.	In the Battlefield	5:20
3.	Woden's Reign	7:01
4.	Deathbringer	7:45
5.	The Siege	8:20
6.	Blood Eagle	8:11
7.	My Name Will Live On	7:33

The lyrics concern the Great Heathen Army invasion of England in 865.

The front cover is taken from the painting "Gizur and the Huns"(1886) by Peter Nicolai Arbo.
