= Concept (band) =

Italian progressive power metal band

- Origin: Italy
- Genres: Progressive metal, power metal, speed metal, symphonic metal
- Years active: 2000–present
- Labels: Underground Symphony
- Members: Mariano Croce; Andrea Mastroianni; Gianni Carcione; Andrea Arcangeli; David Folchitto
- Website: www.conceptsymphony.com

Concept is an Italian progressive power metal band, formed in 2000.

== History ==
After a short experience under the name of A.T.T. (About Traverse Tracks) and after releasing the EP "Abstractive Fallacy" in September 1999, Mariano Croce, Andrea Mastroianni, Gianni Carcione and David Folchitto (now Stormlord, Prophilax), in January 2000, formed the band Concept, producing their first EP "Time Before" in February 2000. In June 2000 they signed a deal with the record label Underground Symphony. Soon after, the bass player Andrea Arcangeli (now DGM) joined the band.

Their first full-length cd Reason and Truth was recorded in the spring of 2001 at the Zenith Studios (Lucca – Italy); because of some negative circumstances, the cd will be mixed only in October 2002, at the New Sin Studio (Loria (TV) – Italy), and released in 2003.
On March 1, 2005, the band released their second album, The Divine Cage, recorded between May and June 2004 at the Cromas Studios (Rome - Italy) and at the New Sin Studio by Luigi Stefanini.

In 2004, guitarist Mariano Croce and keyboard player Andrea Mastroianni played as guests on the Time Machine "Inquisitor Eymerich Trilogy".

Both Concept's albums were well received by magazines and audience, although there are no more news about the band since 2007, last update date on their official web site.

== Band members ==
- Mariano Croce - guitars (2000–present)
- Andrea Mastroianni - keyboards (2000–present)
- Gianni Carcione - lead vocals (2000–present)
- Andrea Arcangeli - bass (2000–present)
- David Folchitto - drums (2000–present)

== Discography ==
Studio albums

- Reason and Truth (2003)
- The Divine Cage (2005)
