= Amadeus Lundberg =

Finnish singer

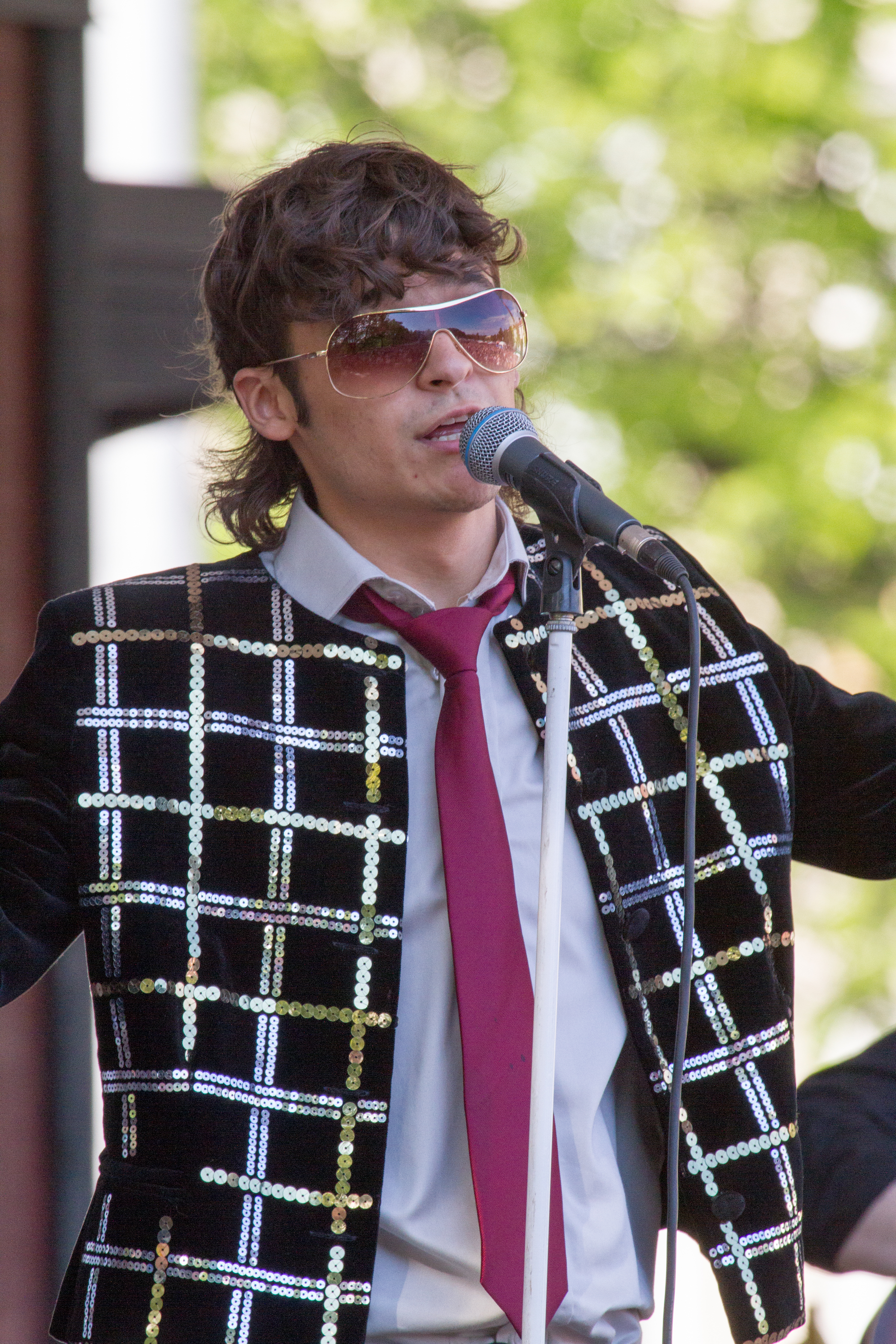
- Amadeus Lundberg

Background information
- Born: 29 March 1989 (age 35); Helsinki, Finland
- Genres: Tango
- Instrument: Singing
- Years active: 2008–

Juha Grigori Amadeus Lundberg (born 29 March 1989), better known as Amadeus, is a Finnish singer. He became famous after winning the Tangomarkkinat tango contest in 2009.

As the Tangomarkkinat winner, Amadeus was invited to Euroviisut 2010 song contest, the Finnish qualification for Eurovision Song Contest 2010, with the song "Anastasia". He qualified for the final on 30 January, but he failed to reach the Super Final.

Amadeus released his debut album on 27 January 2010. The album, simply called Amadeus, featured his first single "Matador", his Tangomarkkinat winning entry "Onnemme kyyneleet" and of course his Euroviisut entry "Anastasia".

Lundberg's father Taisto Lundberg is a member of a well-known band Hortto Kaalo. His aunt is singer Anneli Sari, and his grandfather vuorineuvos Juhani Pesonen.

== Discography ==
=== Albums ===
| Year | Album | Peak positions | Certification |
| Year | Album | FIN | Certification |
|---|---|---|---|
| 2010 | Amadeus | – | |
| 2014 | Vain Rakkaus (with Riku Niemi Orchestra) | 3 | |
| 2016 | Poika Varjoiselta Kujalta | 6 | |

=== Singles ===
- 2009 – "Matador"
- 2010 – "Anastasia"
