= Arachnes =

Italian progressive metal band

Arachnes is an Italian progressive metal band. The band released several albums, among others, four on Scarlet Records.

== Discography ==
- The Goddess Temple (1997)
- Metamorphosis (EP, 2000, Underground Symphony)
- Parallel Worlds (2001, Scarlet Records)
- Apocalypse (2002, Scarlet Records)
- Primary Fear (2003, Scarlet Records)
- In Praise of Science (2006, Scarlet Records)
- A New Day (2011, Lion Music)
