= Doomsword =

Italian heavy metal band

DoomSword
- Origin: Varese, Italy
- Genres: Heavy metal, epic doom metal
- Years active: 1997–present
- Labels: Underground Symphony, Dragonheart
- Members: Deathmaster; Geilt; Wrathlord; The Ancient
- Past members: Sacred Heart; The Forger; Guardian Angel; Guardian Angel II; Nightcomer; Dark Omen; Soldier of Fortune

DoomSword is an Italian heavy metal band from Varese, Northern Italy, that combines elements of doom metal, viking metal and traditional heavy metal. Doomsword's lyrics are concerned with epic themes such as ancient and medieval history, fantasy literature, and European mythology.

== History ==
=== 1014AD and early days ===
Founded in 1997 by Deathmaster (previously a member of the metal band Agarthi), DoomSword were born as a studio project aimed at playing epic / medieval influenced epic metal in the way of Warlord. The original members of the band, Deathmaster and Guardian Angel, were already working together on an ancient music project called 1014AD with strong medieval influences, and after a short hiatus they re-arranged the 1014AD material into proper heavy metal songs, and released them as a demo called Sacred Metal the same year. The original lineup saw Deathmaster taking care of guitars and vocals and Guardian Angel taking care of drums and the second guitar. A session bass guitar player was used for the demo, after which bass player Dark Omen joined the band.

=== Debut album period (1997–1999) ===
In 1998, DoomSword were signed by Italian label Underground Symphony and released their first same-titled album in 1999. New singer Nightcomer joined the band (Deathmaster only took care of guitars). After the release of the album, the band almost split up, with Nightcomer and Guardian Angel leaving DoomSword.

=== Dragonheart period (2001–present) ===
In 2001, Deathmaster resumed his original role of singer in the band, recruited new elements and resurrected the band after a two-year hiatus, and with this new lineup (The Forger and Guardian Angel II at guitars, Grom at drums) the band signed for Dragonheart Records. DoomSword went on to publish four albums with Dragonheart, namely the purely epic Resound the Horn, the Viking-themed Let Battle Commence, the classic metal with Irish influences My Name Will Live On, and the darker and more introspective The Eternal Battle (released in February 2011). In 2002, DoomSword broke their live "silence" by playing a gig with Manilla Road in Porto D'Ascoli, Italy, and subsequently taking part to important underground metal festivals such as the Keep It True, Bang Your Head, Up the Hammers, Headbangers Open Air etc.

== Pseudonyms ==
As mentioned on their official site, DoomSword adopted pseudonyms in 1997 to reinforce their bond with their main influence, US metal band Warlord. The pseudonyms Deathmaster and Guardian Angel are taken from names carved on headstones in the cover painting of Warlord's Deliver Us EP.

== Band members ==
=== Current members ===
- Deathmaster – vocals (1997–present), guitars (1997–1999)
- Geilt – bass (2004–2011, 2018–present)
- WrathLord – drums (2002–present)
- The Ancient – guitars (2010–present)

=== Former members ===
- Soldier of Fortune – bass (1997)
- Dark Omen – bass (1998–2004)
- Nidhoggr – bass (2011–2017)
- Guardian Angel – drums, guitars (1997–1999)
- Nightcomer – vocals (1998–1999)
- Guardian Angel II – guitars (2000–2002)
- Grom – drums (2000–2002)
- The Forger – guitars (2000–2009)
- Sacred Heart – guitars (2003–2013)
- The Autarch – guitars (2013–2018)

== Discography ==
=== Demos ===
- Sacred Metal (1997)

=== Studio albums ===
- Doomsword (1999)
- Resound the Horn (2002)
- Let Battle Commence (2003)
- My Name Will Live On (2007)
- The Eternal Battle (2011)

=== Compilations ===
- DoomSword (2021)
