= Resound the Horn =

Studio album by Doomsword
- Released: 2002
- Genre: Heavy metal, epic doom metal
- Length: 50:11
- Label: Dragonheart Records

Doomsword chronology
Doomsword (1999)	Resound the Horn (2002)	Let Battle Commence (2003)

Resound the Horn is the second album by Italian heavy metal band Doomsword, released in 2002.

It was rated a 4.5 out of 5 by The Metal Crypt.

== Track listing ==
No.	Title	Length
1.	"Shores of Vinland"	7:43
2.	"Onward Into Battle"	7:42
3.	"The Doomsword"	7:48
4.	"MCXIX"	5:22
5.	"For Those Who Died with Sword in Hand"	7:27
6.	"The Youth of Finn Mac Cool"	5:40
7.	"Resound the Horn: Odin's Hail"	8:29
