= Black Society (album) =

Studio album by Arthemis
- Released: 2008
- Genres: Power metal, heavy metal
- Length: 46:04
- Label: Scarlet Records

Arthemis chronology
Back from the Heat (2005)	Black Society (2008)	Heroes (2010)

Black Society is the fifth studio album by the Italian power metal band Arthemis, released in 2008 on Scarlet Records.

Having previously released on Underground Symphony, Arthemis signed with Scarlet Records prior to the release of Black Society.

== Reception ==
Metal Hammer Germany gave Black Society 5 of 7 points alongside a recommendation to buy. The album was "top-notch", contained "refined songwriting" and was altogether "a flawless melodic metal opus that sounds fast-paced and diverse, and despite its traditional approach, doesn't simply regurgitate clichés". Norway's Scream Magazine stated that Black Society might be the best album of Arthemis' career, though the reviewer rated it similarly to the previous ones, 4 points out of 6. The record consisted of "heavy and hard" metal, "straight to the point" which at times "invites to juicy banging". Metal Express Radio bestowed 8 points out of 10, praising the album for "plenty of power, big grinding riffs, catchy solos, attention-getting vocals, and lots of dirty energy". It was not a theatrical, operatic or atmospheric power metal album, but "10 tracks of no-nonsense European Heavy Metal".

Rock Hard, on the other hand, were lukewarm with their rating being 6 out of 10.

== Track listing ==
No.	Title	Length
1.	"Fright Train"	4:28
2.	"Angels in Black"	4:09
3.	"Electri-Fire"	4:37
4.	"Medal of Honor"	4:13
5.	"Escape"	3:43
6.	"Black Society"	7:36
7.	"Mechanical Plague"	3:54
8.	"Let It Roll"	4:06
9.	"Zombie Eater"	5:23
10.	"Mr. Evil"	3:55
