= Reason and Truth =

Studio album by Concept
- Released: September 12, 2003
- Recorded: March–April 2001 Zenith Studios; October 2002 New Sin Studio
- Genre: Power metal, progressive metal, speed metal
- Length: 55:35
- Label: Underground Symphony

Concept chronology
Reason and Truth (2003)	The Divine Cage (2005)

Reason and Truth is the first studio album by the Italian progressive power metal band Concept. The album was recorded in 2001 but mixed only in the end of 2002, that caused a delayed release date in 2003. The album was previously published in Japan (August 15, 2003) by the label Hot Rockin.

== Track listing ==
1. Elegy of Truth – 4:32
2. Running like a Gosth – 4:37
3. The Answer II – 0:59
4. Living a Lie – 4:54
5. Power after Power – 5:02
6. Death of Reason – 7:24
7. Spes Terzia – 4:25
8. Alone (The Conversion) – 4:23
9. Conceptsymphony (The Dialogue) – 9:39
- bonus: Sweet Dreams – 4:01
- bonus: From Ashes to New Life (Japan) – 5:38

== Personnel ==
- Mariano Croce - guitars
- Andrea Mastroianni - keyboards
- Gianni Carcione - lead vocals
- Andrea Arcangeli - bass
- David Folchitto - drums
