= Doomsword (album) =

Studio album by Doomsword
- Released: 1999
- Genre: Heavy metal, epic doom metal
- Length: 47:26
- Label: Underground Symphony

Doomsword chronology
Doomsword (1999)	Resound the Horn (2002)

Doomsword is the self-titled debut album by Italian heavy metal band Doomsword, released in 1999. A number of its tracks reference fantasy literature, such as The Lord of the Rings, and Michael Moorcock's Elric Saga. "Nadsokor" in particular is a reference to the latter. It is also a Cirith Ungol cover.

== Track listing ==
No.	Title	Length
1.	"Sacred Metal"	6:16
2.	"Warbringers"	6:33
3.	"Helms Deep"	7:17
4.	"One Eyed God"	4:37
5.	"Return to Imrryr"	5:06
6.	"Nadsokor"	4:50
7.	"Swords of Doom"	6:34
8.	"On the March"	6:13
