= A Gate Through the Past =

Studio album by Holy Knights
- Released: January 23, 2002 (Japan); June 5, 2002 (worldwide)
- Recorded: November–December 2001 at Zenith Recordings, Lucca
- Genre: Symphonic power metal
- Length: 46:04
- Labels: Tokuma; Underground Symphony
- Producer: Maurizio Chiarello

Holy Knights chronology
Gate Through the Past (1999)	A Gate Through the Past (2002)	Between Daylight and Pain (2012)

A Gate Through the Past is the début full-length album by the Italian symphonic power metal band Holy Knights. It was first released in Japan on January 23, 2002 via Tokuma and re-released by Underground Symphony worldwide on June 5.

== Track listing ==
No.	Title	Length
1.	"March of Brave Knights"	1:39
2.	"Sir Percival (Immortal Knights)"	5:49
3.	"Lord of Nightmares"	5:35
4.	"The Revival of the Black Demon"	0:57
5.	"Gate Through the Past"	6:17
6.	"Love Against the Power of Evil"	6:14
7.	"Rondeau in a Minor"	0:34
8.	"Quest of Heroes - Part I"	3:29
9.	"Quest of Heroes - Part II"	4:30
10.	"The Promise"	4:49
11.	"Under the Light of the Moon"	3:29
12.	"When the Rest Let Down"	2:42
Total length:		46:04

== Background and production ==
Holy Knight was formed in 1998; their first demo recording, Gate Through the Past, was released in December 1999 to positive reviews. After signing a record deal with Underground Symphony in April 2000, the band entered the Zenith Recording studio in Lucca in early November; the recording was completed on December 20.

== Music ==
A Gate Through the Past's sound has been described as bombastic, with many compositions strongly influenced by neoclassical music, despite the fact that none of the band members had formal classical training. Elements of folk and baroque music are evident as well, contributing to the overall medieval atmosphere, while prominent orchestration and choirs add to the symphonic feel. The album was inspired by the fellow power metal bands Royal Hunt, Stratovarius and Rhapsody. When addressing the criticism of being a clone of the latter, the guitarist Danny Merthon and the drummer Claus Jorgen responded that they consider such comparison a compliment due to that band's artistic achievements.

Furthermore, Merthon, the band's principal lyricist, stated to have been inspired by Thomas Malorys compilation Le Morte d'Arthur and the interplay between legends and reality. The album's main lyrical theme is a knight's quest, his dream and nightmare and the challenge of discerning good from evil.

== Credits ==
- Dario Di Matteo (as Mark Raven) – vocals, keyboards
- Salvatore Graziano (as Danny Merthon) – guitars
- Federico Madonia – guitars
- Vincenzo Noto (as Syl Raven) – bass
- Claudio Florio (as Claus Jorgen) – drums
