= Cryonic Temple =

Swedish power metal band

Cryonic Temple is a Swedish power metal band.

The band was founded in 1996, based in Borlänge. Passing their first decade, only guitarist Esa Ahonen was left of the founding members. The band also jettisoned their "fantasy-inspired leather attire and lyrics about dragons and knights" from earlier. Following a break of nine years, the group released a new album in 2017, having signed with Italian Scarlet Records.

== Discography ==
- Chapter I (2002, Underground Symphony)
- Blood, Guts & Glory (2003, Limb Music)
- In Thy Power (2005, Limb Music)
- Immortal (2008, Metal Heaven)
- Into the Glorious Battle (2017, Scarlet Records)
- Deliverance (2018, Scarlet Records)
