= Stormrider (German band) =

German power metal band

Stormrider was a German power metal band. The band issued one album on Underground Symphony and two on Pure Steel Records.

The band hails from Herne.

== Discography and reception ==
Its first release was the extended play Vengeance in 2003. Despite being self-released, it received some reviews. Metal.de gave a 5 out of 10 score, opining: "Stormrider offers some highlights and a few low points, but for the most part, they're rather bland and fail to stand out in either a particularly positive or negative way". Metal.de saw Vengeance as evoking Iron Maiden with "a touch of Iced Earth", whereas Vampster characterized it as Iced Earth with "a touch of Iron Maiden on speed". At the same time, Stormrider boasted "a great voice, killer guitar work, and a solid rhythm section, all rounded off with a powerful sound".

The debut album was Shipwrecked, eventually issued by Underground Symphony in 2005. Vampster repeated their favourable criticism from the EP, calling the album "incredibly strong", featuring "excellent" vocals, "killer guitar solos, driving drums, great backing vocals" and ample "anthems" in the true metal vein. People should buy it despite its minor flaws. Both Vampster and Powermetal.de criticized the drum sound. Everything else was "spot on" according to the latter, and Shipwrecked "would be a real shame" to miss out on. Shipwrecked furthermore received 7.5 out of 10 from Rock Hard. Norway's Scream Magazine only dished out half the possible score, 3 out of 6. The songs showed potential, but the production and performance especially by the singer were not up to par. With several German bands populating the same genre, Stormrider was not among the better.

Fate of the Hunter followed in 2008 on Pure Steel Records. Scream Magazine repeated their score of 3, subtracting points for "remarkably mediocre compositions" as well as questionable bass and drum sound. Powermetal.de was again more positive, giving credit for "a sparklingly clean album that successfully combines power and epic metal and scores points with finely crafted songwriting and convincing hooks".

Rock Hard gave a 7 to both Fate of the Hunter and 2012's The Path of Salvation, also on Pure Steel Records. However, The Path of Salvation received a perfect 10 score from both Metal.de and Powermetal.de.
