= Milana Misic =

Finnish singer

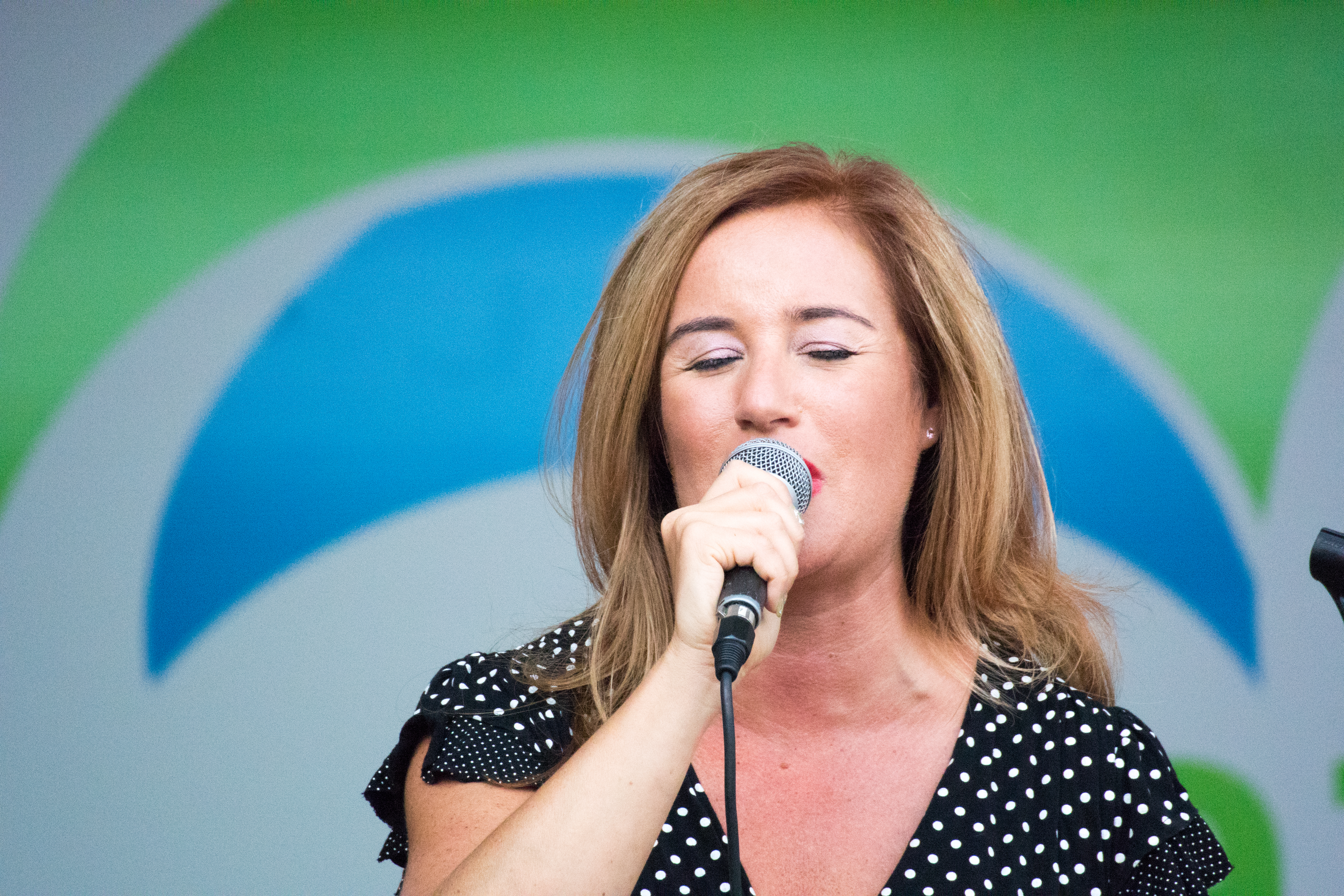
Milana Mišić in 2014

Laila Anna-Maria Milana Mišić-Puukari (née Mišić; born 23 October 1970, Espoo, Finland) is a Finnish singer of Croatian and Finnish descent.

Mišić is the daughter of Finnish Eurovision legend Laila Kinnunen and Yugoslav Croat musician Milan “Mišo” Mišić.

== Discography ==
- Milana (1991)
- Serenata (1993)
- Sydän saa merkin (2001)
- Laulumme (2008)
- Valoa ikkunassa – 12 Laila Kinnusen ikimuistoista laulua (2009)
- Jos itken, jos nauran (2010)
