= Waldo's People =

Finnish Eurodance band

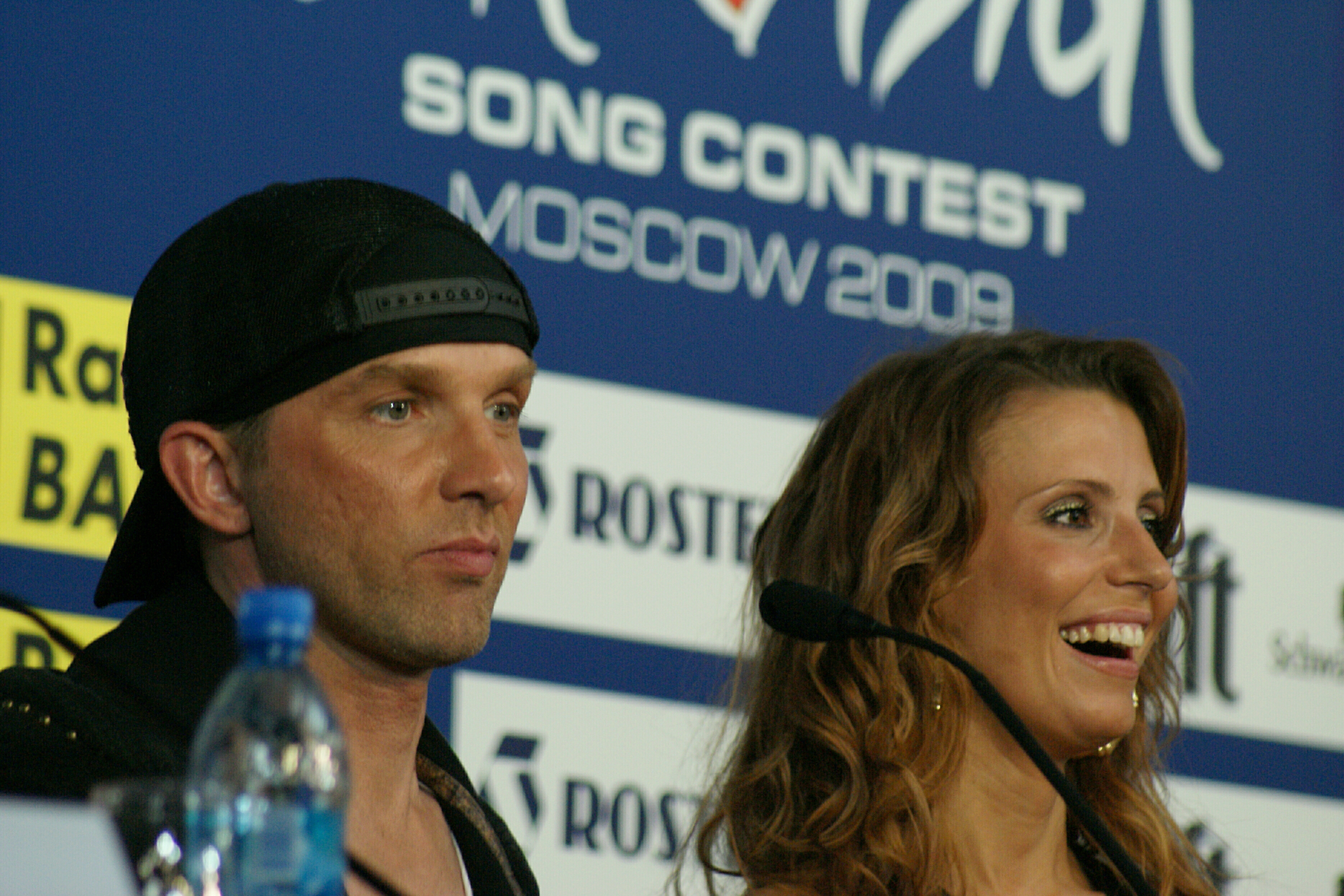
- Waldo's People at a Eurovision 2009 press conference

Background information
- Origin: Finland
- Genre: Eurodance
- Years active: 1998–present
- Labels: Sony BMG; RCA Records
- Members: Waldo (vocal); Emma Häyhä (vocal); Sami Lehto (drums); Karl Sinkkonen (keyboards); Kimmo Nissinen (guitar)
- Website: www.waldospeople.fi

Waldo's People is a Finnish Eurodance band. The lead singer of the band is Waldo, whose real name is Marko Reijonen. They represented Finland in the Eurovision Song Contest 2009, with the song "Lose Control". It won a place for the Eurovision final on 16 May as the jury's chosen act. They finished in last place out of 25 entries with 22 points.

Waldo already had some success in a solo-career in mid-1990s. His band influenced Finnish electronic dance music in the late 1990s and early 2000s. Waldo's People's first video was U Drive Me Crazy. It was the first Finnish video included in MTV Nordic's daily video-rotation.

== Discography ==
=== Albums ===
Year	Title	Chart positions
Year	Title	FIN
1998	Waldo's People	6
2000	No Man's Land	6
2009	Paranoid	13

=== Compilations ===
Year	Title	Chart positions
Year	Title	FIN
2008	Back Again: The Greatest Hits	27

=== Singles ===
Year	Title	Chart positions				Album
Year	Title	FIN	SWE	SWI	UK	Album
1998	U Drive Me Crazy	3	60	-	-	Waldo's People
1998	Let's Get Busy	-	-	-	-	Waldo's People
1998	I Dream	15	-	-	-	Waldo's People
2000	1000 Ways	4	-	-	-	No Man's Land
2000	No Man's Land	18	-	-	-	No Man's Land
2000	Bounce (To The Rhythm Divine)	-	-	-	-	No Man's Land
2001	Remedy	-	-	-	-	No Man's Land
2001	Disconnected	-	-	-	-	No Man's Land
2008	Back Again	1	-	-	-	Back Again: The Greatest Hits
2008	Emperor's Dawn	-	-	-	-	Back Again: The Greatest Hits
2008	Lose Control	1	11	57	100	Paranoid
2009	New Vibration	2	-	-	-	Paranoid
2010	I Wanna Be a Rockstar	15	-	-	-	
2010	Jackpot	19	-	-	-	
2011	Echo	-	-	-	-	
2014	You	-	-	-	-	
2019	Nousee	-	-	-	-	
2022	Life Is Now	-	-	-	-	
2024	Öljytyt lanteet	-	-	-	-	Vain elämää
2024	Draamaa	-	-	-	-	Vain elämää
2024	Sen pituinen se	-	-	-	-	Vain elämää
2024	Kemiaa	-	-	-	-	Vain elämää
2024	Syysunelma	-	-	-	-	Vain elämää
2024	Piironkijalka	-	-	-	-	Vain elämää
2024	How Can I Miss You	-	-	-	-	Vain elämää
2024	Wish I Had an Angel	-	-	-	-	Vain elämää
2024	Markku	-	-	-	-	Vain elämää
2025	Sana vaan	-	-	-	-	
2025	La Fiesta	-	-	-	-	
2026	Boom Boom Boom	-	-	-	-	

== Notes ==
Preceded by Teräsbetoni with Missä miehet ratsastaa	Finland in the Eurovision Song Contest; 2009	Succeeded by Kuunkuiskaajat with Työlki ellää
