= Arthemis =

Italian band

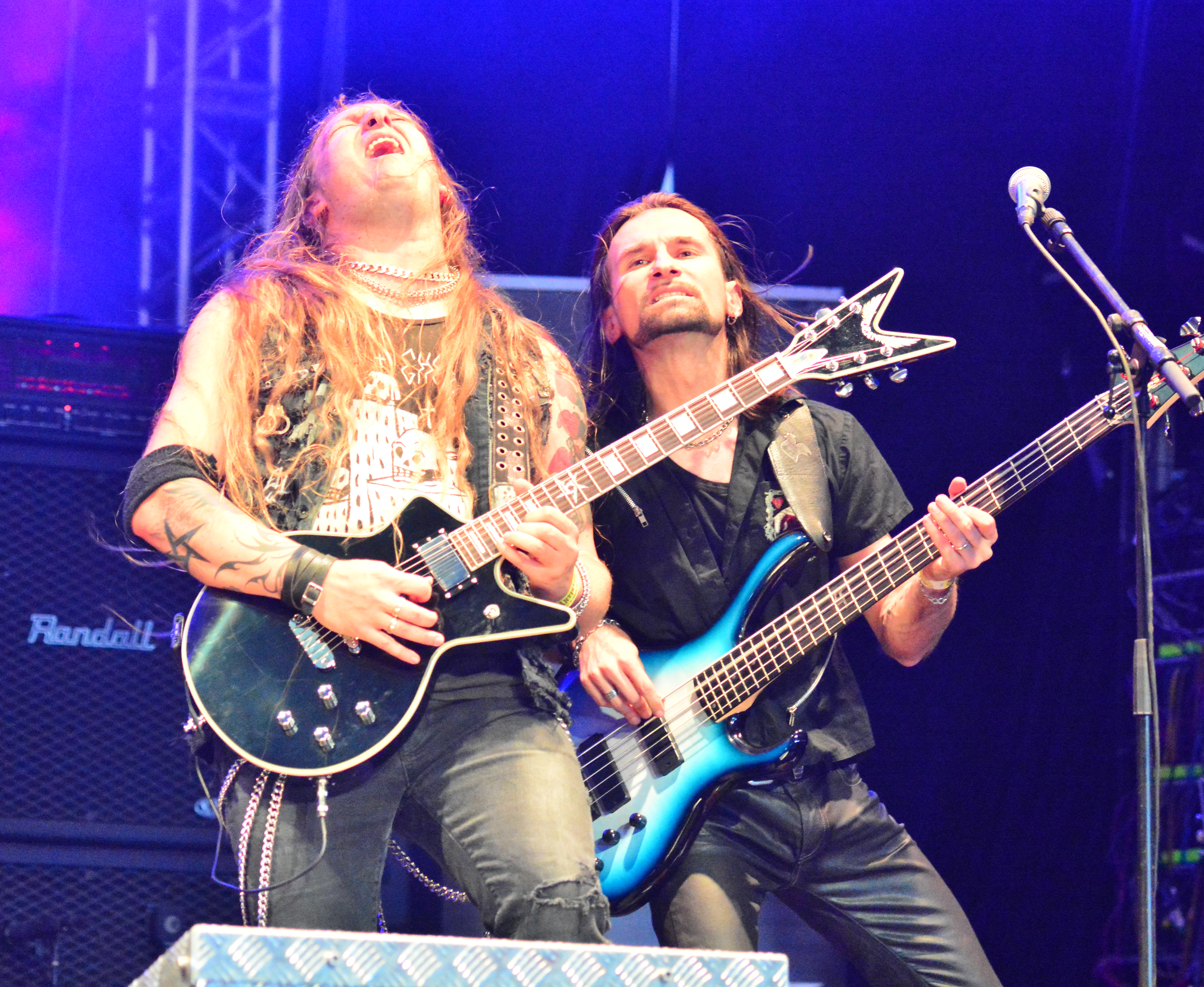
- Arthemis at Wacken Open Air in 2014

Background information
- Origin: Verona, Italy
- Genres: Power metal, heavy metal, thrash metal
- Years active: 1999-present
- Label: Scarlet Records
- Members: Fabio Dessi; Andrea Martongelli; Giorgio Terenziani; Francesco Tresca
- Past members: Alessio Garavello; Matteo Ballottari; Paolo Perazzani; Matteo Galbier; Alberto Caria; Corrado Rontani; Paolo Caridi; Damiano Perazzini
- Website: www.arthemisweb.com

Arthemis are an Italian power metal/heavy metal band.

== History ==
Originally called "Nemhesis" having recorded a six-track demo in 1996 under that name, they were formed by the guitarist Andrea Martongelli in 1999. Singer Alessio Garavello joined Arthemis in 1999 (shortly after the release of Church of the Ghost and also became the second guitarist after Matteo Ballottari had left the band.

Arthemis have released eight studio albums starting with the 1999 debut album Church of the Ghost. The band has also appeared on rock and metal themed TV shows Rock TV Sala Prove, Rock TV Database, and played for an advertising spot for “Fiat” cars. In 2010, Arthemis appeared on the Metal Hammer UK Judas Priest tribute album The Metal Forge: Volume 1 - Judas Priest: British Steel, covering "United".

Under the leadership of original member, Andrea Martongelli, the band has moved from power metal to a more heavy metal and thrash metal sound.

== Members ==
=== Current Lineup ===
- Fabio Dessi - vocals (2009-present)
- Andrea Martongelli - guitars (1999-present)
- Giorgio Terenziani - bass (2013-present)
- Francesco Tresca - drums (2012-present)

=== Former members ===
- Alessio Garavello - vocals (1999–2009), guitars (2007-2009)
- Matteo Ballottari - guitars (1999-2007)
- Matteo Galbier - bass (1999-2009)
- Damiano Perazzini - bass (2009-2013)
- Alessio Turrini - drums (1999-2002)
- Paolo Perazzani - drums (2002-2009)
- Corrado Rontani - drums (2009-2011)
- Paolo Caridi - drums (2011-2012)

Timeline

== Discography ==
=== Studio albums ===
- Church of the Ghost (1999)
- The Damned Ship (2001)
- Golden Dawn (2003)
- Back From the Heat (2005)
- Black Society (2008)
- Heroes (2010)
- We Fight (2012)
- Blood-Fury-Domination (2017)

=== Live albums ===
- Live From Hell (2014)
