= Finland in the Eurovision Song Contest 2009 =

- Eurovision Song Contest 2009
- Participating broadcaster: Yleisradio (Yle)
- Country: Finland
- Selection process: Euroviisut 2009
- Selection date: 31 January 2009

Competing entry
- Song: "Lose Control"
- Artist: Waldo's People
- Songwriters: Waldo; Karima; Ari Lehtonen; Annie Kratz-Gutå

Placement
- Semi-final result: Qualified (12th, 42 points)
- Final result: 25th, 22 points

Participation chronology

Finland was represented at the Eurovision Song Contest 2009 with the song "Lose Control" written by Waldo, Karima, Ari Lehtonen, and Annie Kratz-Gutå, and performed by the band Waldo's People. The Finnish participating broadcaster, Yleisradio (Yle), organised the national final Euroviisut 2008 in order to select its entry for the contest. 12 entries were selected to compete in the national final, which consisted of three semi-finals, a Second Chance round and a final, taking place in January 2009. Eight entries ultimately competed in the final on 30 January where votes from the public selected "Lose Control" performed by Waldo's People as the winner.

Finland was drawn to compete in the first semi-final of the Eurovision Song Contest which took place on 12 May 2009. Performing during the show in position 15, "Lose Control" was announced among the ten qualifying entries of the first semi-final and therefore qualified to compete in the final on 16 May. It was later revealed that Finland had been selected by back-up juries to qualify after placing twelfth out of the 18 participating countries in the semi-final with 42 points. In the final, Finland performed in position 24 and placed twenty-fifth (last) out of the 25 participating countries, scoring 22 points.

== Background ==
Prior to the 2009 contest, Yleisradio (Yle) had participated in the Eurovision Song Contest representing Finland forty-two times since its first entry in 1961. It has won the contest once in 2006 with the song "Hard Rock Hallelujah" performed by Lordi. In 2008, "Missä miehet ratsastaa" performed by Teräsbetoni managed to qualify to the final and placed twenty-second.

As part of its duties as participating broadcaster, Yle organises the selection of its entry in the Eurovision Song Contest and broadcasts the event in the country. The broadcaster confirmed its intentions to participate at the 2009 contest on 20 June 2008. Yle had selected its entries for the contest through national final competitions that have varied in format over the years. Since 1961, a selection show that was often titled Euroviisukarsinta highlighted that the purpose of the program was to select a song for Eurovision. Along with its participation confirmation, the broadcaster also announced that its entry for the 2009 contest would be selected through the Euroviisut selection show.

== Before Eurovision ==
=== Euroviisut 2009 ===
The logo of Euroviisut 2009

Euroviisut 2009 was the national final that selected Finland's entry for the Eurovision Song Contest 2009. The competition consisted of three stages that commenced with the first of three semi-finals on 9 January 2009, followed by a Second Chance round on 31 January 2009 and concluded with a final also on 31 January 2009. The three stages were hosted by Eurovision Song Contest 2007 host Jaana Pelkonen and YleX DJ Mikko Peltola. All shows were broadcast on Yle TV2 and online at yle.fi. Both the Second Chance round and the final were also broadcast via radio on Yle Radio Suomi.

==== Format ====
The format of the competition consisted of three stages: three semi-finals, a Second Chance round and a final. Four songs competed in each semi-final and the top two entries from each semi-final directly qualified to the final. The remaining two entries of each semi-final competed in the Second Chance round where an additional two entries qualified to complete the eight-song lineup in the final. The results for all three stages were determined exclusively by a public vote. Public voting included the options of telephone and SMS voting.

==== Competing entries ====
Twelve artists were directly invited by Yle to compete in the national final following consultation with record companies and presented during a press conference on 25 September 2008. Among the competing artists was former Finnish Eurovision entrant Jari Sillanpää who represented Finland in 2004. The competing entries were released on 3 December 2008.

Artist	Song	Songwriter(s)
Janita	"Martian"	Janita Maria, Tomi Sachary
Jari Sillanpää	"Kirkas kipinä"	Petri Laaksonen
Kwan	"10,000 Light Years"	Harry Sommerdahl, Pauli Rantasalmi, Jaani Peuhu, Mari Pajalahti
Passionworks feat. Tony Turunen	"Surrender"	Kristian Pihlajaharju, Harriet Hägglund
Remu	"Planeetta"	Remu Aaltonen, Ilkka Vainio, Risto Asikainen
Riikka	"Meren"	Ville Laaksonen, Riikka Timonen, Saara Honkanen, Suvi Nurmi
Sani	"Doctor, Doctor"	Maki Kolehmainen, Mats Tärnfors, Steven Stewart
Signmark feat. Osmo Ikonen	"Speakerbox"	Brandon Bauer, Heikki Soini, Kim Eiroma, Marko Vuoriheimo, Osmo Ikonen
Tapani Kansa	"Rakkautta on, rauhaa ei"	Mika Toivanen, Tapani Kansa
Tiara	"Manala"	Tiia Marjanen
Vink	"The Greatest Plan"	Anders Alanen, Mats Kindstedt, Tomi Aremaa
Waldo's People	"Lose Control"	Ari Lehtonen, Karima, Waldo, Annie Kratz-Gutå

==== Semi-finals ====
The three semi-final shows took place on 9, 16 and 23 January 2009 at the Tohloppi Studios in Tampere. The top two from the four competing entries in each semi-final qualified directly to the final based on the results from the public vote, while the remaining two entries advanced to the Second Chance round. In addition to the competing entries, Step Up Dancers performed as the interval act in all three semi-finals.

Semi-final 1 – 9 January 2009
R/O	Artist	Song	Televote	Place	Result
1	Kwan	"10,000 Light Years"	31.9%	2	Final
2	Riikka	"Meren"	—	—	Second Chance
3	Tapani Kansa	"Rakkautta on, rauhaa ei"	37.4%	1	Final
4	Tiara	"Manala"	—	—	Second Chance

Semi-final 2 – 16 January 2008
R/O	Artist	Song	Televote	Place	Result
1	Sani	"Doctor, Doctor"	—	—	Second Chance
2	Passionworks feat. Tony Turunen	"Surrender"	—	—	Second Chance
3	Remu	"Planeetta"	28.6%	2	Final
4	Waldo's People	"Lose Control"	44.3%	1	Final

Semi-final 3 – 23 January 2009
R/O	Artist	Song	Televote	Place	Result
1	Signmark feat. Osmo Ikonen	"Speakerbox"	46.5%	1	Final
2	Janita	"Martian"	—	—	Second Chance
3	Vink	"The Greatest Plan"	—	—	Second Chance
4	Jari Sillanpää	"Kirkas kipinä"	34.0%	2	Final

==== Second Chance ====
The Second Chance round took place before the final on 31 January 2009 at the Leonardo Hall in Tampere where the entries placed third and fourth in the preceding three semi-finals competed. The top two from the six competing entries qualified to the final based on the results of a public vote.

Second Chance – 31 January 2009
R/O	Artist	Song	Result
1	Passionworks feat. Tony Turunen	"Surrender"	Final
2	Tiara	"Manala"	—N/a
3	Riikka	"Meren"	—N/a
4	Vink	"The Greatest Plan"	Final
5	Janita	"Martian"	—N/a
6	Sani	"Doctor, Doctor"	—N/a

==== Final ====
The final took place on 31 January 2009 at the Leonardo Hall in Tampere where the eight entries that qualified from the preceding three semi-finals and the Second Chance round competed. The winner was selected over two rounds of public televoting. In the first round, the top three from the eight competing entries qualified to the second round, the superfinal. In the superfinal, "Lose Control" performed by Waldo's People was selected as the winner. A three-member judging panel also providing feedback to the competing artists during the show. The panel consisted of Thomas Lundin (Finnish Eurovision commentator on Yle FST), Hanna-Riikka Siitonen (singer and vocal coach) and Merituuli Lindström (television presenter). In addition to the performances of the competing entries, the interval act featured Northern Kings and Scandinavian Hunks.

Final – 31 January 2009
R/O	Artist	Song	Result
1	Kwan	"10,000 Light Years"	—N/a
2	Jari Sillanpää	"Kirkas kipinä"	—N/a
3	Signmark feat. Osmo Ikonen	"Speakerbox"	Advanced
4	Tapani Kansa	"Rakkautta on, rauhaa ei"	—N/a
5	Waldo's People	"Lose Control"	Advanced
6	Remu	"Planeetta"	—N/a
7	Passionworks feat. Tony Turunen	"Surrender"	Advanced
8	Vink	"The Greatest Plan"	—N/a

Superfinal – 31 January 2009
R/O	Artist	Song	Televote	Place
1	Signmark feat. Osmo Ikonen	"Speakerbox"	42.2%	2
2	Waldo's People	"Lose Control"	45.1%	1
3	Passionworks feat. Tony Turunen	"Surrender"	13.7%	3

== At Eurovision ==
According to Eurovision rules, all nations with the exceptions of the host country and the "Big Four" (France, Germany, Spain and the United Kingdom) are required to qualify from one of two semi-finals in order to compete for the final; the top nine songs from each semi-final as determined by televoting progress to the final, and a tenth was determined by back-up juries. The European Broadcasting Union (EBU) split up the competing countries into six different pots based on voting patterns from previous contests, with countries with favourable voting histories put into the same pot. On 30 January 2009, a special allocation draw was held which placed each country into one of the two semi-finals. Finland was placed into the first semi-final, to be held on 12 May 2009. The running order for the semi-finals was decided through another draw on 16 March 2009 and Finland was set to perform in position 15, following the entry from Romania and before the entry from Portugal.

The two semi-finals and the final were televised in Finland on Yle TV2 with commentary in Finnish with a second audio program providing commentary in Finnish by Jaana Pelkonen, Mikko Peltola and Asko Murtomäki, and in Swedish by Tobias Larsson. The three shows were also broadcast via radio with Finnish commentary by Sanna Pirkkalainen and Jorma Hietamäki on Yle Radio Suomi. The Finnish spokesperson, who announced the Finnish votes during the final, was 2004 Finnish Eurovision entrant Jari Sillanpää.

=== Semi-final ===
Waldo's People took part in technical rehearsals on 4 and 8 May, followed by dress rehearsals on 11 and 12 May. The Finnish performance featured the members of Waldo's People performing in black and silver outfits joined by two backing vocalists and two fire artists. The LED screens displayed blue urban scenes with an illuminated train running from one side to the other and the stage also featured two metal boxes with fire coming out. The performance also featured pyrotechnic effects. The two backing vocalists that joined Waldo's People on stage were Manna Borg and Päivi Virkkunen, while the two fire artists were Niko Virtanen and Kasmir Jolma.

At the end of the show, Finland was announced as having qualified for the grand final. It was later revealed that Finland was selected as the back-up jury qualifier after placing twelfth in the semi-final, receiving a total of 42 points.

=== Final ===
Shortly after the first semi-final, a winners' press conference was held for the ten qualifying countries. As part of this press conference, the qualifying artists took part in a draw to determine the running order for the final. This draw was done in the order the countries appeared in the semi-final running order. Finland was drawn to perform in position 24, following the entry from the United Kingdom and before the entry from Spain.

Waldo's People once again took part in dress rehearsals on 15 and 16 May before the final, including the jury final where the professional juries cast their final votes before the live show. The band performed a repeat of their semi-final performance during the final on 16 May. At the conclusion of the voting, Finland finished in twenty-fifth (last) place with 22 points.

=== Voting ===
The voting system for 2009 involved each country awarding points from 1-8, 10 and 12, with the points in the final being decided by a combination of 50% national jury and 50% televoting. Each nation's jury consisted of five music industry professionals who are citizens of the country they represent. This jury judged each entry based on: vocal capacity; the stage performance; the song's composition and originality; and the overall impression by the act. In addition, no member of a national jury was permitted to be related in any way to any of the competing acts in such a way that they cannot vote impartially and independently.

Following the release of the full split voting by the EBU after the conclusion of the competition, it was revealed that Finland had placed twenty-second with the public televote and twenty-fourth with the jury vote in the final. In the public vote, Finland scored 30 points, while with the jury vote, Finland scored 12 points.

Below is a breakdown of points awarded to Finland and awarded by Finland in the first semi-final and grand final of the contest. The nation awarded its 12 points to Iceland in the semi-final and to Estonia in the final of the contest.

==== Points awarded to Finland ====
Points awarded to Finland (Semi-final 1)
Score	Country
12 points	Iceland
10 points	Sweden
8 points	
7 points	
6 points	
5 points	Malta
4 points	United Kingdom
3 points	Andorra; Montenegro; Portugal
2 points	
1 point	Belgium; Romania

Points awarded to Finland (Final)
Score	Country
12 points	
10 points	
8 points	Iceland
7 points	
6 points	
5 points	
4 points	Estonia; Sweden
3 points	Bulgaria; Malta
2 points	
1 point	

==== Points awarded by Finland ====
Points awarded by Finland (Semi-final 1)
Score	Country
12 points	Iceland
10 points	Sweden
8 points	Bosnia and Herzegovina
7 points	Turkey
6 points	Israel
5 points	Switzerland
4 points	Belarus
3 points	Malta
2 points	Portugal
1 point	Armenia

Points awarded by Finland (Final)
Score	Country
12 points	Estonia
10 points	Iceland
8 points	Norway
7 points	Sweden
6 points	Bosnia and Herzegovina
5 points	Turkey
4 points	France
3 points	Malta
2 points	Azerbaijan
1 point	Armenia

==== Detailed voting results ====
The following members comprised the Finnish jury:

- Pekka Laine – Head of Music at Yle
- Jukka Haarma – director
- Satu Mättö – student
- Christel Sundberg (Chisu) – musician
- Sofia Tarkkanen – development manager at Yle Vision

Detailed voting results from Finland (Semi-final 1)
R/O	Country	Televotes	Rank	Points
01	Montenegro	549	14	
02	Czech Republic	241	17	
03	Belgium	469	15	
04	Belarus	2,103	7	4
05	Sweden	5,949	2	10
06	Armenia	1,147	10	1
07	Andorra	703	12	
08	Switzerland	2,219	6	5
09	Turkey	2,693	4	7
10	Israel	2,430	5	6
11	Bulgaria	404	16	
12	Iceland	9,846	1	12
13	Macedonia	787	11	
14	Romania	654	13	
15	Finland			
16	Portugal	1,651	9	2
17	Malta	1,828	8	3
18	Bosnia and Herzegovina	4,237	3	8

Detailed voting results from Finland (Final)
R/O	Country	Results					Points
R/O	Country	Jury	Televoting			Combined	Points
R/O	Country	Jury	Votes	Rank	Points	Combined	Points
01	Lithuania		1,531	18			
02	Israel	1	2,292	11		1	
03	France	6	3,467	8	3	9	4
04	Sweden	2	7,517	4	7	9	7
05	Croatia		947	23			
06	Portugal		2,230	12			
07	Iceland	12	9,865	3	8	20	10
08	Greece		2,757	10	1	1	
09	Armenia	4	1,409	19		4	1
10	Russia		3,180	9	2	2	
11	Azerbaijan		4,441	6	5	5	2
12	Bosnia and Herzegovina	3	5,358	5	6	9	6
13	Moldova		1,187	21			
14	Malta	7	1,986	14		7	3
15	Estonia	10	16,225	1	12	22	12
16	Denmark		1,692	15			
17	Germany		1,650	17			
18	Turkey	5	3,909	7	4	9	5
19	Albania		2,191	13			
20	Norway	8	15,560	2	10	18	8
21	Ukraine		1,242	20			
22	Romania		1,079	22			
23	United Kingdom		1,659	16			
24	Finland						
25	Spain		672	24			
