= Paul Oxley's Unit =

Finnish rock band

Paul Oxley's Unit is a Finnish rock band that gained success in Finland in the early 1980s.

The band's lead singer, Manchester-born Malcolm Campbell, is better known by his stage name Paul Oxley. The other current members of the band are Uffe Enberg (guitars), Kjell Ekholm (bass), Nicke Björkqvist (drums) and Rob Dominis (keyboards). The band's 1981 debut album Living in the Western World went platinum by selling over 60 000 copies in Finland.

== Selected discography ==
=== Albums ===
- Living in the Western World (1981)
- Both Sides of the Equator (1982)
- After the Party (1983)
- The Paul Oxley's Unit Collection (1987)
- The Magic (1996)
- Spanish Bars – The Very Best of Paul Oxley's Unit (2001)
- Collections (2007)
- Living in the Western World (30 year anniversary album/DVD) (2011)
- Black Gold (35 year anniversary album) (2015)
- All the Gods Were Happy (2019)
