= Linda Brava (album) =

1999 studio album by Linda Brava

Studio album by Linda Brava
- Released: 1999
- Recorded: III & V. 1999, Potton Hall, Westleton
- Genre: Classical
- Length: 57:32
- Label: EMI Classics
- Producer: Stephen Johns

Linda Brava is a debut classical album by Finnish violinist Linda Brava, released worldwide in 1999. The album was released through the EMI Classics label.

Linda Brava is a collection of easy-on-the-ear violin favourites including pieces by Edvard Grieg, Jules Massenet, Johann Sebastian Bach, Charles Gounod, Edward Elgar, Gabriel Fauré, Fritz Kreisler, Niccolò Paganini and Jean Sibelius. On this EMI Abbey Road production, Brava's accompanist is well-known John Lenehan.

Brava's music video for Ave Maria can be seen on Classic FM TV, and it is also featured on the first edition of the DVD Classic FM [2003].

== Track listing ==
- Salut D'amour (Liebesgruss), Op.12
- Berceuse, Op.16
- Rondino, Op.81, No.2
- Ave Maria
- I. Allegro Molto Ed Appassionato
- II. Allegretto Espressivo Alla Romanza - Allegro Molto - Tempo I
- III. Allegro Animato
- Humoreske I, Op.87, No.1
- Cantabile (Kompositionen Fur Gitarre Und Streichinstrumente, 1. Serie, No. 8)
- Meditation (Thais)
- Romance, Op.78, No.2
- Marche Miniature Viennoise

== Reviews ==
- Andante (September 2000)

Linda Brava, a sultry, blond Finnish actor and model, was a child prodigy on the violin, and is still an amazingly proficient performer. The high point of her fine recital disc with pianist John Lenehan is a strong reading of Grieg's Sonata no.3, in C Minor.

- The Gramophone (December 1999)

A promising début recital.

This is a delightful recital, lightweight to be sure, but played with such warmth, and an eloquent simplicity of line, that the ear is instantly beguiled. The opening Elgar Salut d'amour is pleasing enough but the following Faure Berceuse is utterly winning, and the famous 'Meditation' from Massenet's Thaïs soars aloft without being in the least sentimentalized.

The central performance of the Grieg Sonata is strong, passionate and most compelling. The central Allegretto espressivo alla Romanza (pure mountain-stream Grieg) is exquisitely played, and how beautifully the excellent pianist, John Lenehan, prepares the way for his soloist's warm-hearted entry. The finale has a splendidly gutsy, folksy impetus and plenty of light and shade. Both artists are very well recorded and the balance is excellent.

The playing itself is nicely polished as well as musically sensitive. A welcome collection.

- The Straits Times (November 1999)

Brava's is both a musically satisfying and technically commendable performance.

- Evening Standard (November 1999)

Her best playing comes in the three short pieces by her countryman Sibelius: the skittish Rondino extracts her quickest fingerwork, the Humoreske Op.87 No.1 wins her most tortured expression and the Romance Op.78 No.2 sings under her confident touch.

- Classic FM Magazine (October 1999)

The Finnish fiddler with a model-girl looks takes a bow with her debut classical album.

Linda plays with a pleasant, honeyed tone - making the most of her golden-voiced 1781 Galliano violin - and an unaffected grace that will surely win her many friends.

== Quote ==
- Linda Brava

I experienced the happiest moments in my career, when playing the first notes with pianist John Lenehan at the recording of the classical album. Then I realized that my dream had come true. It was such a privilege to record for EMI Classics, the same label that has Yehudi Menuhin, Plácido Domingo, Montserrat Caballe, Maria Callas, Simon Rattle etc. on their recordings. It was such a great pleasure to work with the production team and John Lenehan, who is a fantastic pianist, artist and person-
