= Paul Oxley =

English songwriter

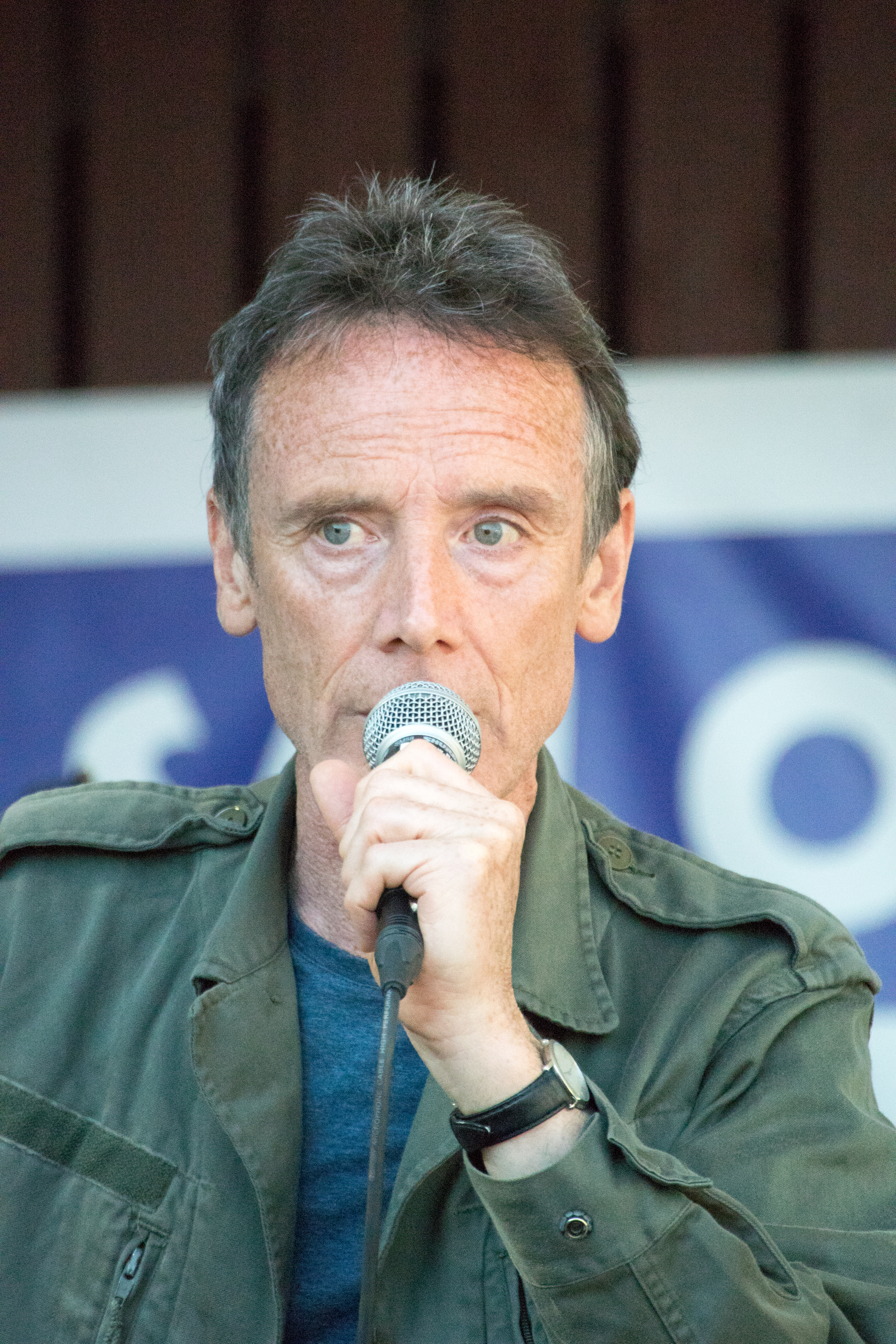
Paul Oxley

Malcolm Campbell, professionally known as Paul Oxley, is an English songwriter, lyricist and producer living in Sidmouth, UK. He is the lead singer of the Finnish rock band Paul Oxley's Unit.
