= Underground Symphony =

Italian record label

- Founded: 1 July 1994
- Founder: Maurizio Chiariello
- Genre: Heavy metal
- Country of origin: Italy
- Location: Basaluzzo, Piedmont
- Official website: undergroundsymphony.it

Underground Symphony is an Italian record label specialised in metal music. It is best known for having launched artists such as Labyrinth, Skylark, White Skull, Fabio Lione and Olaf Thorsen.

== Catalog ==
Catalog number	Release year	Artist	Title
USCD-001	1994	various	Underground Symphony
USCD-002	1994	Witchhunters	...And It's Storming Outside
USCD-003	1994	Evil Wings	Evil Wings
USCD-004	1995	White Skull	I Won't Burn Alone
USCD-005	1995	Labyrinth	Piece of Time (EP)
USCD-006	1996	Madsword	Evolution (EP)
USCD-007	1996	Labyrinth	No Limits
USCD-008	1996	Acacia	Deeper Secrets
USCD-009	1996	Altered Vision	Fantasia
USCD-010	1996	Lost Innocence	A Tale Never Told
USCD-011	1996	Frost Bite	Secret Admirer
USCD-012	1996	Glory Hunter	Ulysses Day Two
USCD-013	1996	Skylark	Waiting for the Princess... (EP)
USCD-014	1996	Skylark	After the Storm
USCD-015	1996	Evil Wings	Brightleaf
USCD-016	1996	Depression	Daymare
USCD-017	1997	Skylark	Dragon's Secrets
USCD-018	1997	Cauldron Born	Born of the Cauldron
USCD-019	1997	The Quiet Room	Introspect
USCD-020	1997	White Skull	Embittered
USCD-021	1997	Helreið	Mémoires
USCD-022	1997	Arkhè	Arkhè
USCD-023	1997	H. Kristal	Empty
USCD-024	1997	Shadows of Steel	Shadows of Steel
USCD-025	1998	Eddy Antonini	When Water Became Ice
USCD-026	1998	Avalanch	Eternal Flame
USCD-026/027	1998	Avalanch	La Llama.../Eternal Flame (single)
USCD-028	1998	Mesmerize	Tales of Wonder
USCD-029	1998	Projecto	Projecto
USCD-030	1998	Shadows of Steel	Twilight (EP)
USCD-031	1998	Cauldron Born	God of Metal
USCD-032	1999	Lie Tears	A Gate for Another Life...
USCD-033	1999	DoomSword	DoomSword
USCD-034	1999	White Skull	Asgard (EP)
USCD-035	1999	Pandæmonium	...And the Runes Begin to Pray
USCD-036	1999	Skylark	Belzebù (EP)
USCD-037	1999	Arachnes	Metamorphosis (EP)
USCD-038	1999	White Skull	Tales from the North
USCD-039	1999	Wonderland	Somewhere in My Eyes (EP)
USCD-040	1999	Skylark	Divine Gates part I: Gate of Hell
USCD-041	2000	Ambermoon	Facing the Storm (EP)
USCD-042	2000	Shadows of Steel	Heroes (EP)
USCD-043	2000	Deadline	Dressed to Kill
USCD-044	2000	Madsword	The Global Village
USCD-045	2000	Helreið	Fingerprints of the Gods (EP)
USCD-046	2000	Projecto	Crown of Ages
USCD-047	2000	Wonderland	Wonderland
USCD-048	2000	various	Return of the Mountain King: A Tribute to Savatage
USCD-049	2000	Shadows of Steel	Second Floor
USCD-050	2000	Skylark	Divine Gates part II: Gate of Heaven
USCD-051	2001	Time Machine	Aliger Daemon (EP)
USCD-052	2002	Mesmerize	Vultures Paradise
USCD-053	2001	Landguard	Eden of a Parallel Dimension
USCD-054	2001	Holy Knights	A Gate Through the Past
USCD-055	2001	Time Machine	Evil – Liber Primus
USCD-056	2002	Cryonic Temple	Chapter I
USCD-057	2001	Arthemis	The Damned Ship
USCD-058	2001	Skanners	Flagellum Dei
USCD-059	2002	Cauldron Born	...And Rome Shall Fall
USCD-060	2001	Skylark	The Princess' Day
USCD-061	2001	Sabaton	Fist for Fight
USCD-066	2003	Concept	Reason and Truth
USCD-083	2005	Stormrider	Shipwrecked
USCD-086	2005	Concept	The Divine Cage
US CD-149	2015	Enzo and the Glory Ensemble	In the Name of The Father
