= Ireland Eurovision Song Contest entries discography =

This is a discography of the Ireland entries for the Eurovision Song Contest, featuring the highest chart placing attained on the Irish Singles Chart.

== Irish Singles Chart ==
Year	Artist	Song	Chart Position
1965	Butch Moore	"I'm Walking the Streets in the Rain"	1
1966	Dickie Rock	"Come Back to Stay"	1
1967	Sean Dunphy	"If I Could Choose"	2
1968	Pat McGeegan	"Chance of a Lifetime"	1
1969	Muriel Day	"The Wages of Love"	1
1970	Dana	"All Kinds of Everything"	1
1971	Angela Farrell	"One Day Love"	4
1972	Sandie Jones	"Ceol an Ghrá"	1
1973	Maxi	"Do I Dream?"	7
1974	Tina Reynolds	"Cross Your Heart"	1
1975	The Swarbriggs	"That's What Friends Are For"	2
1976	Red Hurley	"When?"	4
1977	The Swarbriggs Plus Two	"It's Nice to Be in Love Again"	1
1978	Colm C. T. Wilkinson	"Born to Sing"	8
1979	Cathal Dunne	"Happy Man"	5
1980	Johnny Logan	"What's Another Year?"	1
1981	Sheeba	"Horoscopes"	3
1982	The Duskeys	"Here Today, Gone Tomorrow"	12
1984	Linda Martin	"Terminal 3"	7
1985	Maria Christian	"Wait Until the Weekend Comes"	15
1986	Luv Bug	"You Can Count On Me"	2
1987	Johnny Logan	"Hold Me Now"	1
1988	Jump the Gun	"Take Him Home"	3
1989	Kiev Connolly and the Missing Passengers	"The Real Me"	17
1990	Liam Reilly	"Somewhere in Europe"	6
1991	Kim Jackson	"Could It Be That I'm in Love?"	7
1992	Linda Martin	"Why Me?"	1
1993	Niamh Kavanagh	"In Your Eyes"	1
1994	Paul Harrington and Charlie McGettigan	"Rock 'n' Roll Kids"	2
1995	Eddie Friel	"Dreamin'"	5
1996	Eimear Quinn	"The Voice"	3
1997	Marc Roberts	"Mysterious Woman"	2
1998	Dawn Martin	"Is Always Over Now?"	24
1999	The Mullans	"When You Need Me"	Failed to chart
2000	Eamonn Toal	"Millennium of Love"	Failed to chart
2001	Gary O'Shaughnessy	"Without Your Love"	Failed to chart
2003	Mickey Harte	"We've Got the World"	1
2004	Chris Doran	"If My World Stopped Turning"	1
2005	Donna and Joe	"Love?"	2
2006	Brian Kennedy	"Every Song Is a Cry for Love"	4
2007	Dervish	"They Can't Stop the Spring"	Failed to chart
2008	Dustin the Turkey	"Irelande Douze Pointe"	5
2009	Sinéad Mulvey and Black Daisy	"Et Cetera"	6
2010	Niamh Kavanagh	"It's for You"	8
2011	Jedward	"Lipstick"	1
2012	Jedward	"Waterline"	5
2013	Ryan Dolan	"Only Love Survives"	13
2014	Can-linn feat. Kasey Smith	"Heartbeat"	39
2015	Molly Sterling	"Playing with Numbers"	77
2016	Nicky Byrne	"Sunlight"	68
2017	Brendan Murray	"Dying to Try"	Failed to chart
2018	Ryan O'Shaughnessy	"Together"	17
2019	Sarah McTernan	"22"	Failed to chart
2020	Lesley Roy	"Story of My Life"	Failed to chart
2021	Lesley Roy	"Maps"	76
2022	Brooke	"That's Rich"	54
2023	Wild Youth	"We Are One"	93
2024	Bambie Thug	"Doomsday Blue"	23
2025	Emmy	"Laika Party"	49

== Notes ==
Ireland did not participate in 1983 or 2026.

== See also ==
- Ireland in the Eurovision Song Contest
