= Brendan Murray =

Irish singer (born 1996)

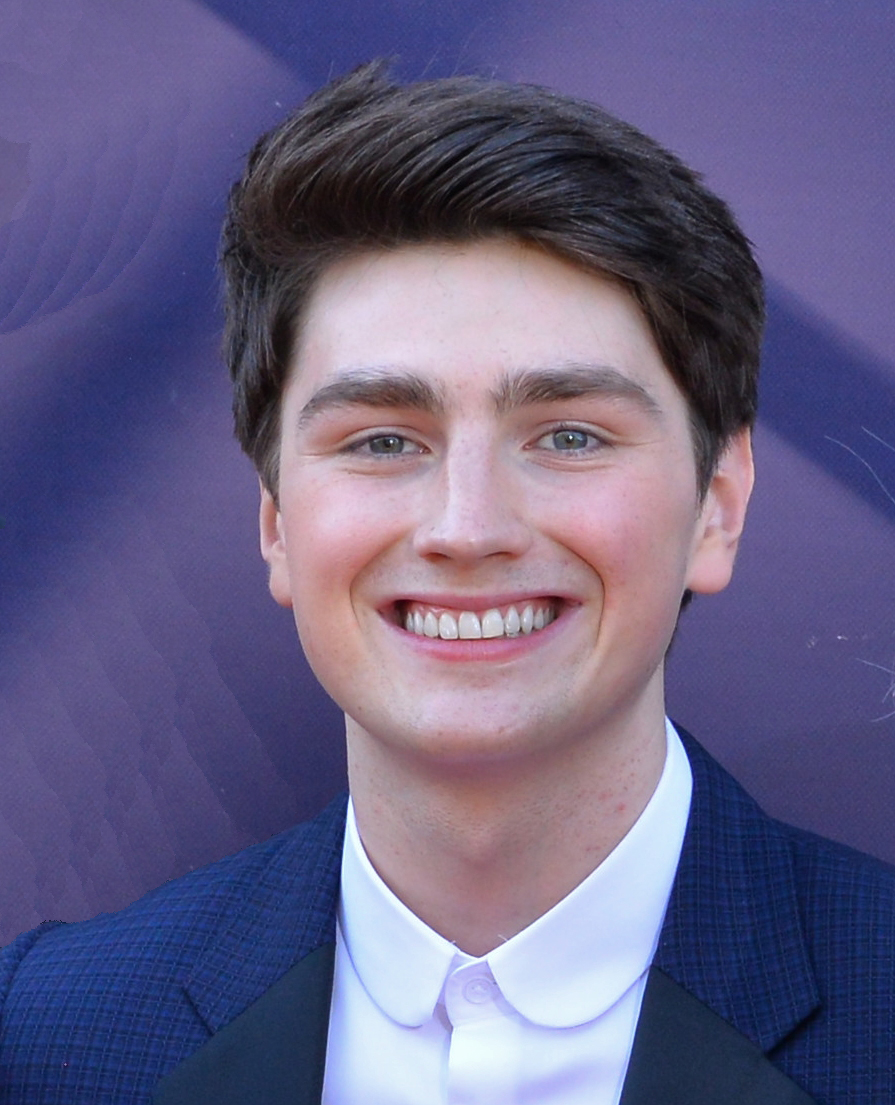
- Murray in 2017

Background information
- Born: Brendan Hugh Francis Murray; 16 November 1996 (age 29); Tuam, County Galway, Ireland
- Genre: Pop
- Occupation: Singer
- Instrument: Vocals
- Years active: 2014–present
- Labels: Universal; Sony UK

Brendan Hugh Francis Murray (born 16 November 1996) is an Irish singer and former member of the Irish boy band HomeTown. He represented Ireland in the Eurovision Song Contest 2017 with the song "Dying to Try", though he did not qualify for the final. He then competed in The X Factor (UK) in 2018, and was the twelfth contestant eliminated.

== Life and career ==
Brendan was born in Tuam, County Galway. He attended St Patrick's Primary School and St Jarlath's College, both in Tuam.

=== 2014–2016: HomeTown ===
In 2014, Murray became a member of the Irish boy band HomeTown, managed by Louis Walsh. The band achieved three chart successes in its home country, including the number one singles "Where I Belong" in 2014, and "Cry for Help" in 2015. Their debut album, HomeTown, was released in November 2015 and peaked at number four in Ireland. In December 2016, the band announced that it was going on an indefinite hiatus.

=== 2016–2017: Eurovision Song Contest ===
On 16 December 2016, Murray was announced as the Irish representative in the Eurovision Song Contest 2017. His song, "Dying to Try", was released on 10 March 2017. He didn't reach the final, placing 13th out of the 18 contestants; only the top ten finishers were qualified.

=== 2018: The X Factor ===
In 2018, Murray entered Season 15 of The X Factor UK. During the Six Chair challenge he received a safe seat from One Direction singer Louis Tomlinson, its first recipient, on the way to the live shows. He sang "Break Free" by Ariana Grande for his first X Factor live performance, with a 'This Is Me' theme. The second week, 'Guilty Pleasure' week, Murray sang "Believe" by Cher. On Sunday's results show, he was in the bottom three to compete in the sing-off. He was given equal votes by the judges, along with LMA Choir. The result went to deadlock, reverting to the earlier public votes. LMA Choir had the fewest votes and Brendan was saved and continued to the next week. On the third week of 'Fright Night', Murray performed "Youngblood" by 5 Seconds of Summer. During Week 4, he sang "Everybody Hurts" by R.E.M. for 'Movie Week'. He was eliminated in the semifinal on the Saturday show after he received the fewest votes from the public along with Danny Tetley, was the twelfth contestant eliminated.

The X Factor performances and results
Show	Song choice	Theme	Result
Auditions	"We Don't Have to Take Our Clothes Off" – Ella Eyre	—N/a	Through to six-chair challenge
Auditions	"This Woman's Work" – Kate Bush	—N/a	Through to six-chair challenge
Six-chair challenge	"Everybody Hurts" – R.E.M.	—N/a	Through to judges' houses (Golden buzzer)
Judges' houses	"Nothing Compares 2 U" – Sinéad O'Connor	—N/a	Through to live shows
Live show 1	"Break Free" – Ariana Grande ft. Zedd	This is Me	Safe
Live show 2	"Believe" – Cher	Guilty Pleasures	Bottom three (12th)
Live show 2	"High and Dry" – Radiohead	Sing-off	Safe (Deadlock)
Live show 3	"Youngblood" – 5 Seconds of Summer	Fright Night	Safe
Live show 4	"Everybody Hurts" – R.E.M.	Movie Night	Safe
Quarter-Final	"Say Something" – A Great Big World ft. Christina Aguilera	Big Band	Safe
Semi-Final	"Run" – Snow Patrol	Get Me to the Final (Part I)	Eliminated (5th place)
Semi-Final	"I Have a Dream" – ABBA	Mamma Mia	Eliminated (5th place)

=== 2021–present ===
In January 2022, Murray was announced as one of 6 participants in the running to represent Ireland in the Eurovision Song Contest 2022 in Turin, Italy. His song "Real Love" was written over lockdown by Murray and Darrell Coyle. He finished in 6th place (last place) with 12 points.

== Discography ==
=== Singles ===
Title	Year	Album
"Dying to Try"	2017	Non-album singles
"Way Too Fast"	2018	Non-album singles
"If I'm Honest"	2019	Non-album singles
"Falling"	2020	Non-album singles
"Teardrops"	2020	Non-album singles
"Nothing Compares 2 U"	2020	Non-album singles
"Let Go"	2020	Non-album singles
"500 Days"	2020	Non-album singles
"Wishing You Home For Christmas"	2020	Non-album singles
"Here to Stay"	2021	Non-album singles
"Deep Fake"	2022	Non-album singles
"Real Love"	2022	Non-album singles

Awards and achievements
Preceded by Nicky Byrne with "Sunlight"	Ireland in the Eurovision Song Contest; 2017	Succeeded by Ryan O'Shaughnessy with "Together"
