= Ireland in the Eurovision Song Contest 2019 =

- Eurovision Song Contest 2019
- Participating broadcaster: Raidió Teilifís Éireann (RTÉ)
- Country: Ireland
- Selection process: Internal selection
- Announcement date: 8 March 2019

Competing entry
- Song: "22"
- Artist: Sarah McTernan
- Songwriters: Janieck van de Polder; Marcia Sondeijker; Roel Rats

Placement
- Semi-final result: Failed to qualify (18th)

Participation chronology

Ireland was represented at the Eurovision Song Contest 2019 with the song "22", written by Janieck Devy, Marcia "Misha" Sondeijker, and Roel Rats, and performed by Sarah McTernan. The Irish participating broadcaster, Raidió Teilifís Éireann (RTÉ), internally selected its entry for the contest.

The country's participation attracted some calls for a boycott due to Israel's policies towards Palestine. Prior to the contest, the entry was promoted by a music video and live performances in Spain and the United Kingdom. Ireland competed in the second semi-final of the Eurovision Song Contest, which took place on 16 May 2019. The song placed last at the end of voting, receiving 16 points and subsequently failing to qualify for the grand final.

== Background ==
Prior to the 2019 contest, Raidió Teilifís Éireann (RTÉ) and its predecessor national broadcasters have participated in the Eurovision Song Contest representing Ireland 51 times since RÉ's first entry in 1965. They have won the contest a record seven times in total, the most out of any country. Their first win came in 1970, with "All Kinds of Everything" performed by Dana. Ireland holds the record for being the only country to win the Eurovision Song contest three times in a row (in 1992, 1993, and 1994), as well as having the only three-time winner (Johnny Logan, who won in 1980 as a singer, 1987 as a singer-songwriter, and again in 1992 as a songwriter). In 2018, Ireland qualified for grand final for the first time in five years, placing 16th with the song "Together" by Ryan O'Shaughnessy.

As part of its duties as participating broadcaster, RTÉ organises the selection of its entry in the Eurovision Song Contest and broadcasts the event in the country. In October 2018, it was revealed that RTÉ had confirmed its participation in the 2019 contest. The confirmation came as some voices in the country began to call for a boycott of the Israeli contest due to their policies towards Palestinians. This included a campaign from Ireland's third largest political party, Sinn Féin. Additionally, a petition was created that amassed close to 3500 signatures. However, Irish deputy Prime Minister Tánaiste Simon Coveney reaffirmed the Irish commitment to Eurovision, arguing that a boycott would not help the Palestinian cause.

== Before Eurovision ==
=== Internal selection ===
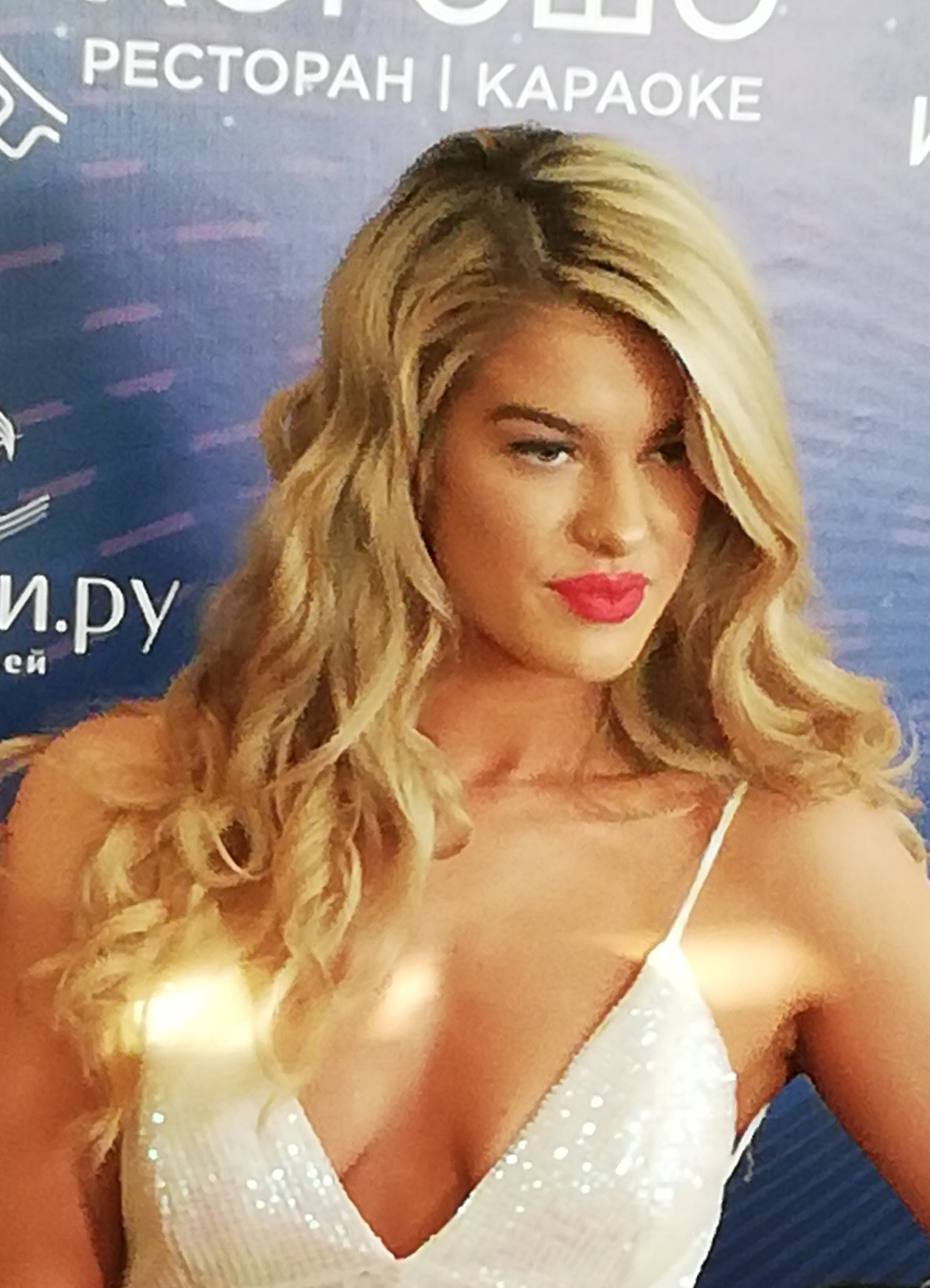
Sarah McTernan at the Eurovision pre-party in Moscow.

Raidió Teilifís Éireann (RTÉ) confirmed its intentions to participate at the Eurovision Song Contest 2019 on 14 September 2018. On 4 October 2018, the broadcaster opened a submission period where artists and composers "with a proven track record of success in the music industry" were able to submit their entries until 23 November 2018. In addition to the public submissions, RTÉ reserved the right to approach established artists and composers to submit entries and to match songs with different artists to the ones who submitted an entry. At the closing of the deadline, 440 entries were received and 70 entries were shortlisted in January 2019. Rumours of the Irish contestant included former One Direction member Niall Horan, Una Healy from the Saturdays and former X Factor contestant Janet Devlin; however both Horan and Delvin denied the rumours.

On 8 March 2019, RTÉ announced that they had internally selected Sarah McTernan to represent Ireland at the Eurovision Song Contest 2019 in Tel Aviv. McTernan had previously attempted to represent San Marino in the Eurovision Song Contest 2018. Along with the announcement that McTernan would represent Ireland on 8 March, name of the song to be performed by McTernan, "22", which was selected by various focus groups that featured music experts, journalists, Eurovision fans and BIMM students, was announced. The song was written by Janieck Devy, Marcia "Misha" Sondeijker and Roel Rats, and was released to Spotify and iTunes on 29 March.

=== Promotion ===
For promotion of the entry, a music video was filmed at the Dollymount Strand in Dublin that features McTernan in a large pink coat by the sea. McTernan's first live performance of the song took place on 10 March, during the Irish version of Dancing with the Stars. She also performed at Eurovision fan events in London and Madrid. Additionally, McTernan travelled to Israel to film her introductory postcard, used in the show to introduce her entry. The postcard depicts McTernan at Eilot date orchard, riding a horse and dancing among the date trees.

=== Calls for a boycott ===
Prior to the contest, several groups called for Ireland to boycott the contest due to Israel's treatment of the Palestinian people. The winner of the Eurovision Song Contest 1994, Charlie McGettigan and the host of the 1997 contest, Carrie Crowley, were part of a group calling on Ireland to boycott the competition. Micheál Mac Donncha, who was Lord Mayor of Dublin at the time, called for a boycott of the competition, stating his belief that "the horrific ordeal of the Palestinian people needs to be highlighted", while his Sinn Féin colleague Lynn Boylan of the European Parliament wrote to RTÉ to encourage them not to participate that year. Ireland's Tánaiste and minister for foreign affairs Simon Coveney spoke against a boycott, saying that it would "polarise things even further".

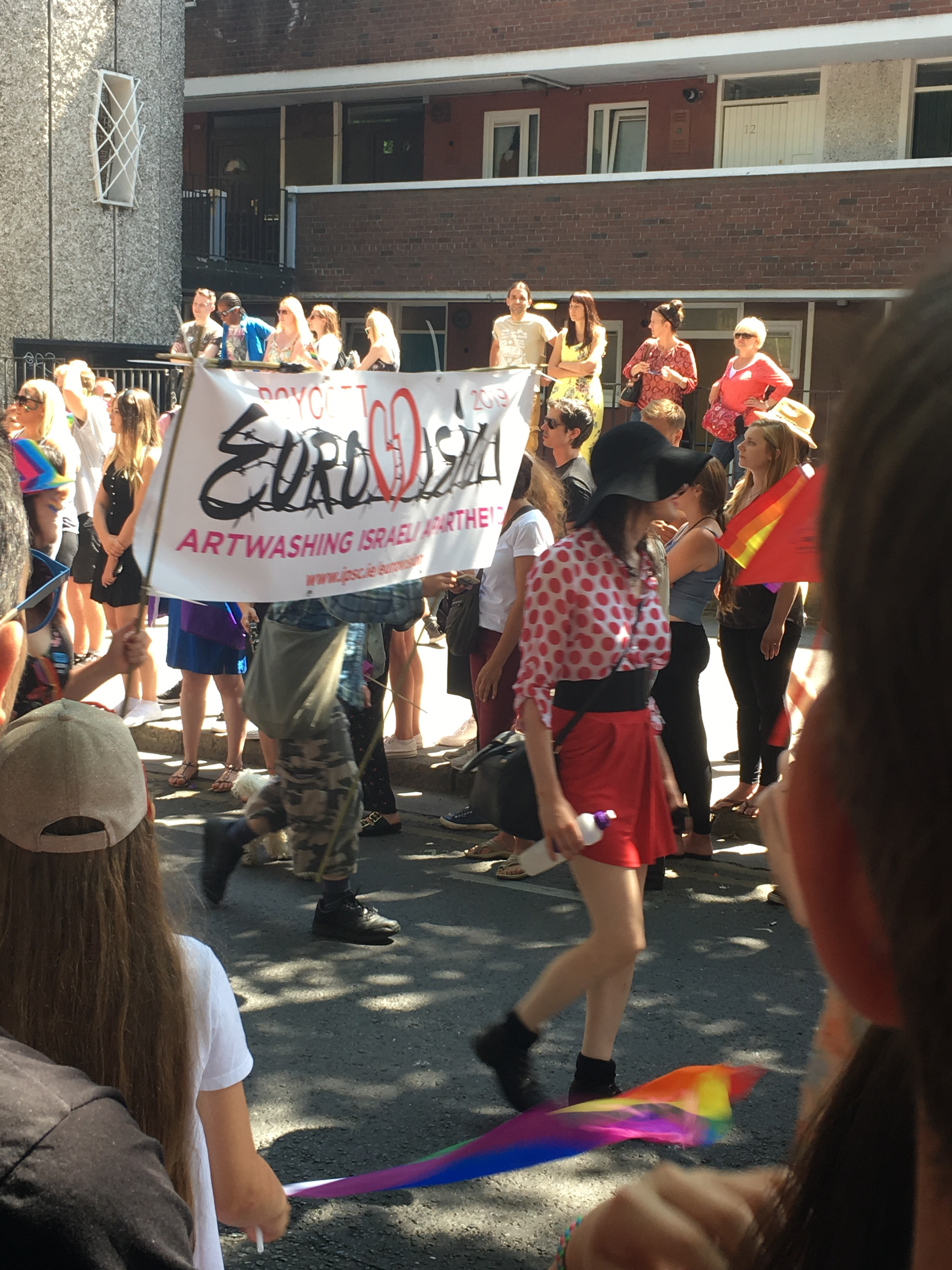
Marchers in Dublin Pride 2018 holding an Ireland Palestine Solidarity Campaign banner, calling for a boycott of the contest

In response to these calls, RTÉ stated that the contest was a non-political event, but that it would not sanction any member of staff who did not want to travel to the contest.

== At Eurovision ==
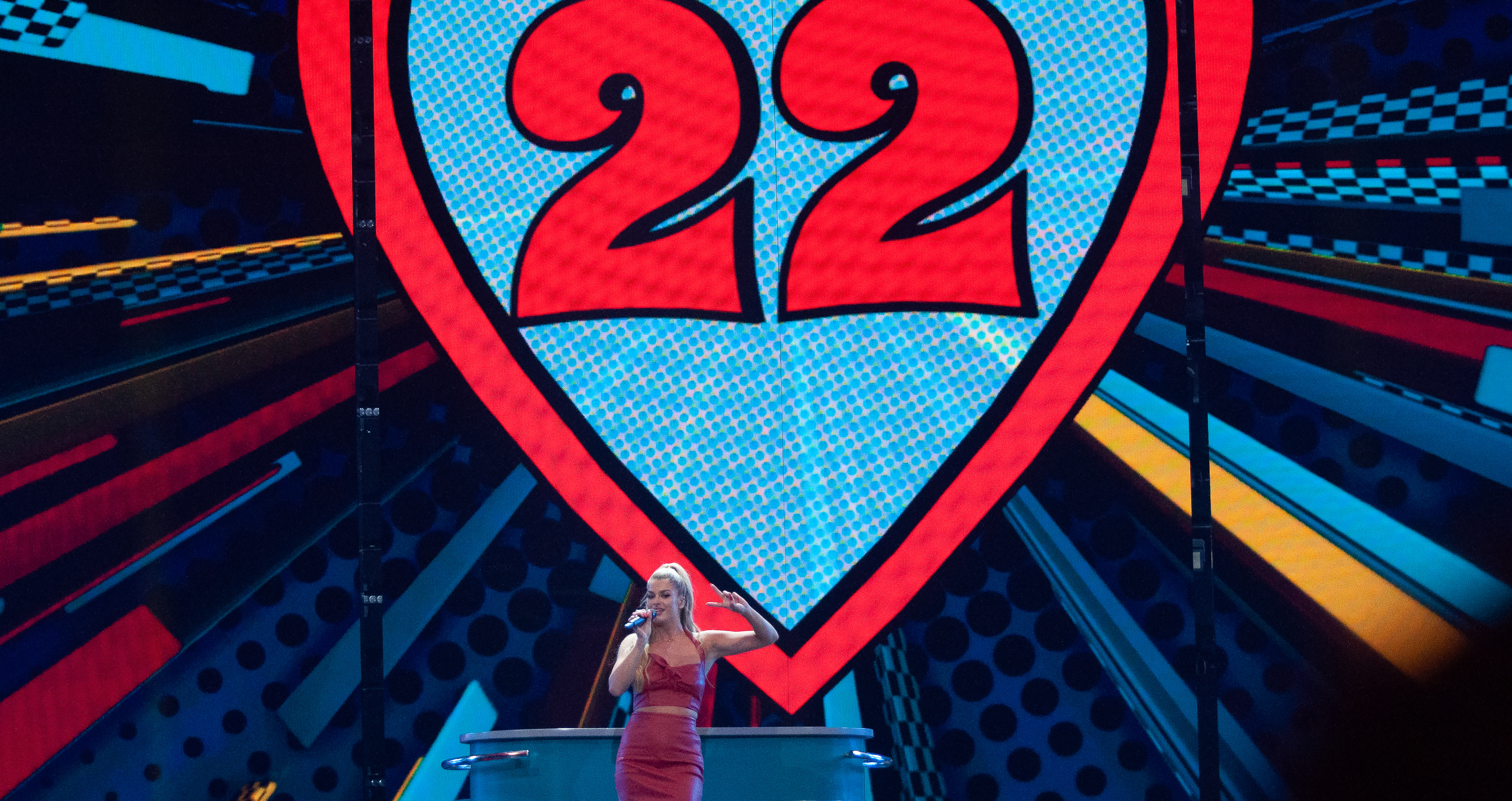
McTernan performing at the dress rehearsal for the second semi final in Tel Aviv.

The Eurovision Song Contest 2019 consisted of two semi-finals held on the respective dates of 14 and 16 May and the grand final on 18 May 2019. It was held at Expo Tel Aviv in Tel Aviv, Israel. According to Eurovision rules, all participating nations with the exceptions of the host country and the "Big Five" (France, Germany, Italy, Spain and the United Kingdom) were required to qualify from one of two semi-finals in order to compete for the final, however, the top ten countries from each semi-final progress to the final. On 28 January 2019, a special allocation draw was held which placed each country into one of the two semi-finals, as well as which half of the show they would perform in. Ireland was placed into the second semi-final, to be held on 16 May 2019, and was scheduled to perform in the first half of the show.

The running order for the semi-finals was decided by the producers of the Eurovision Song Contest 2019 rather than through another draw; this was done to ensure a cohesive show and mitigate the possibility of similar songs being performed consecutively. Both of the semi-finals were broadcast on RTÉ2 while the final was broadcast on RTÉ One. The television broadcasts featured commentary by Irish television personality Marty Whelan.

=== Semi-final ===
On 16 May 2019, Ireland performed 2nd in the second semi final, following the entry from Armenia and preceding the entry from Moldova. The performance was themed to fit a 1950s diner and featured McTernan spinning on a bar table and drinking milkshakes. She was praised for her vocal performance.

At the end of the show, Ireland was not announced among the top 10 entries in the second semi-final and therefore failed to qualify to compete in the grand final. It was later revealed that country placed last at number 18 in the semi-final, receiving a total of 16 points: 3 points from the televoting and 13 from the juries.

=== Voting ===
Voting during the three shows involved each country awarding two sets of points from 1-8, 10 and 12: one from their professional jury and the other from televoting. Each nation's jury consisted of five music industry professionals who are citizens of the country they represent, with their names published before the contest to ensure transparency. The jury judged each entry based on: vocal capacity, the stage performance, the song's composition and originality, and the overall impression by the act. In addition, no member of a national jury was permitted to be related in any way to any of the competing acts in such a way that they cannot vote impartially and independently. The individual rankings of each jury member as well as the nation's televoting results were released shortly after the grand final.

==== Points awarded to Ireland ====
Points awarded to Ireland (Semi-final 2)
Score	Televote	Jury
12 points		
10 points		
8 points		Italy
7 points		
6 points		
5 points		Moldova
4 points		
3 points	United Kingdom	
2 points		
1 point		

==== Points awarded by Ireland ====
Points awarded by Ireland (Semi-final 2)
Score	Televote	Jury
12 points	Lithuania	Sweden
10 points	Norway	Switzerland
8 points	Netherlands	Netherlands
7 points	Russia	Norway
6 points	Switzerland	North Macedonia
5 points	Sweden	Azerbaijan
4 points	Malta	Malta
3 points	Azerbaijan	Denmark
2 points	Denmark	Armenia
1 point	Romania	Croatia

Points awarded by Ireland (Final)
Score	Televote	Jury
12 points	Norway	Sweden
10 points	Australia	Switzerland
8 points	Netherlands	Netherlands
7 points	Switzerland	Azerbaijan
6 points	Iceland	Norway
5 points	Russia	North Macedonia
4 points	Italy	Australia
3 points	United Kingdom	Russia
2 points	Sweden	Germany
1 point	Estonia	Italy

==== Detailed voting results ====
The following members comprised the Irish jury:

- Paddy McKenna (jury chairperson) – singer, songwriter, band lead singer, broadcaster
- Emma Reynolds – singer
- Jennifer O'Brien – music and entertainment journalist
- Aidan O'Connor – songwriter
- Ronan Hardiman – composer, songwriter

Detailed voting results from Ireland (Semi-final 2)
R/O	Country	Jury							Televote	
R/O	Country	P. McKenna	E. Reynolds	J. O'Brien	A. O'Connor	R. Hardiman	Rank	Points	Rank	Points
01	Armenia	16	11	4	10	7	9	2	16	
02	Ireland									
03	Moldova	15	13	13	14	14	16		13	
04	Switzerland	8	1	2	1	6	2	10	5	6
05	Latvia	17	15	16	17	10	17		11	
06	Romania	14	9	12	15	11	15		10	1
07	Denmark	7	3	17	12	9	8	3	9	2
08	Sweden	3	2	3	2	1	1	12	6	5
09	Austria	13	12	15	3	17	12		17	
10	Croatia	6	8	7	13	12	10	1	12	
11	Malta	5	14	10	5	8	7	4	7	4
12	Lithuania	9	17	8	7	16	13		1	12
13	Russia	12	10	9	11	5	11		4	7
14	Albania	4	16	14	16	15	14		15	
15	Norway	1	7	6	4	13	4	7	2	10
16	Netherlands	2	4	1	8	4	3	8	3	8
17	North Macedonia	11	6	5	9	2	5	6	14	
18	Azerbaijan	10	5	11	6	3	6	5	8	3

Detailed voting results from Ireland (Final)
R/O	Country	Jury							Televote	
R/O	Country	P. McKenna	E. Reynolds	J. O'Brien	A. O'Connor	R. Hardiman	Rank	Points	Rank	Points
01	Malta	13	16	17	6	9	11		15	
02	Albania	11	24	21	25	24	22		25	
03	Czech Republic	23	12	20	14	10	19		16	
04	Germany	3	23	11	19	16	9	2	23	
05	Russia	15	7	10	16	7	8	3	6	5
06	Denmark	10	9	25	18	15	14		12	
07	San Marino	24	18	26	23	22	25		22	
08	North Macedonia	9	6	5	8	3	6	5	17	
09	Sweden	6	2	1	2	1	1	12	9	2
10	Slovenia	25	20	23	26	25	26		19	
11	Cyprus	18	17	13	9	20	18		20	
12	Netherlands	2	3	2	10	4	3	8	3	8
13	Greece	26	15	24	11	23	21		26	
14	Israel	22	25	18	3	18	12		18	
15	Norway	1	8	6	4	14	5	6	1	12
16	United Kingdom	12	19	12	13	12	16		8	3
17	Iceland	17	10	15	12	21	17		5	6
18	Estonia	19	13	22	7	17	13		10	1
19	Belarus	14	22	16	24	19	23		21	
20	Azerbaijan	5	5	7	5	2	4	7	13	
21	France	16	21	8	22	11	15		14	
22	Italy	7	14	9	20	8	10	1	7	4
23	Serbia	21	11	19	15	13	20		24	
24	Switzerland	4	1	3	1	5	2	10	4	7
25	Australia	8	4	4	17	6	7	4	2	10
26	Spain	20	26	14	21	26	24		11	
