= Ryan O'Shaughnessy =

Irish singer (born 1992)

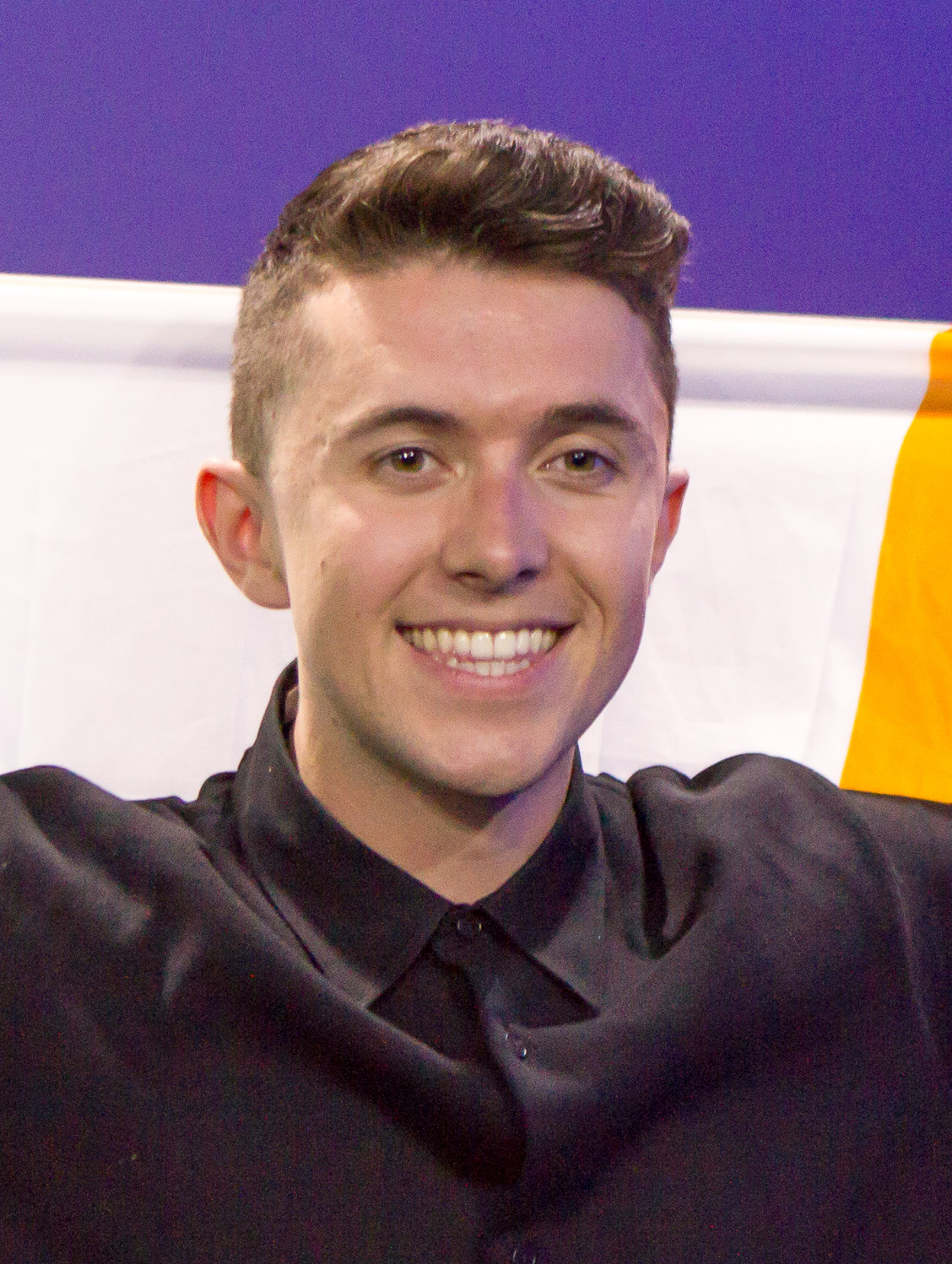
- O'Shaughnessy at the Eurovision Song Contest 2018

Background information
- Born: 27 September 1992 (age 33)
- Origin: Rush, County Dublin, Ireland
- Genre: Pop
- Occupations: Singer, actor
- Years active: 2001–present
- Labels: Sony, Syco, RCA (2012–present)

Ryan O'Shaughnessy (born 27 September 1992) is an Irish singer and former actor from Loughshinny, Skerries, County Dublin. He portrayed Mark Halpin in the popular TV series Fair City for nine years (2001–2010). In January 2012, he appeared in the inaugurative season of The Voice of Ireland and in May 2012, he took part in sixth series of Britain's Got Talent making it to the final and finishing in fifth place. He represented Ireland in the Eurovision Song Contest 2018 with the song "Together" finishing 16th.

== Early life ==
Ryan was born in 1992 in Loughshinny, a small village in North County Dublin, Ireland. He is the youngest of three children. He has an elder brother named Graham and sister named Apryl. His uncle Gary O'Shaughnessy represented Ireland in Eurovision Song Contest 2001 with the song "Without Your Love".

Ryan studied at Dublin Institute of Technology (DIT), also undertaking a music course as part of BIMM (British and Irish Modern Music Institute) in Dublin, Ireland. He describes himself as a "versatile singer". He joined the Billie Barry Stage School when he was 4, and believes this is where he learnt his craft. He plays guitar, piano and saxophone while producing and writing for various artists.

== Acting career ==
O'Shaughnessy played the role of Mark Halpin, the young son of Marty Halpin (played by Paul Lee) and Tess Halpin (played by Sabina Brennan) in the long-running Irish soap series Fair City. The Halpin family was gradually introduced in the early 2000s. O'Shaughnessy was introduced into the series at age 9 as a child actor portraying Mark. He had two siblings in the series, brother Damien played by Maclean Burke and sister Laura Halpin played by Liana O'Cleirigh.

In the series, his mother Tess becomes a victim of domestic abuse and is ultimately strangled by her husband Marty who goes on to commit suicide after killing her. The children Mark, Damien and Laura are orphaned but continue on the series. O'Shaughnessy continued to act as Mark Halpin in Fair City for nine years from 2001 to 2010, when he was retired at age 18. He was replaced in the series by the actor Cal Kenealy who continued as Mark Halpin, as O'Shaughnessy said he needed to quit preferring to continue with a musical career after nine years of appearing in the series.

== Music career ==
=== The Voice of Ireland ===
O'Shaughnessy entered The Voice of Ireland in series 1 broadcast on RTÉ One from January to April 2012. At his audition recorded in October 2011 and broadcast in January 2012, he sang "The Power of Love" from Huey Lewis and the News with only one of the four jury chairs, that of Brian Kennedy turning and he defaulted to Kennedy's team. For the battle shows recorded in November 2011 and broadcast in February 2012, Kennedy put him up against teammate Colin Hand. They both performed "One" by U2 with Kennedy opting for Ryan and sending him to the live shows. In the first day of the live shows broadcast on 4 March 2012, he performed "Baby" from Justin Bieber, but was eliminated by public vote finishing in 23/24th place in the series.

=== Britain's Got Talent ===
After the battle rounds but before the live shows of The Voice of Ireland, O'Shaughnessy auditioned for Britain's Got Talent. He performed a self-written song called "No Name". The inspiration behind the song was a girl he had a crush on. He received yeses from all three judges, Simon Cowell, Alesha Dixon and David Walliams. The audition aired after his elimination from The Voice of Ireland. At that time, O'Shaughnessy was contracted to record company Universal Records. One week before the live shows of The Voice of Ireland, the Britain's Got Talent call-backs were held. The judges were going to send O'Shaughnessy through to the live shows, but owing to his place on the live shows on The Voice of Ireland and contract with Universal, he was disqualified. It was later announced that O'Shaughnessy would appear in the semi-finals of Britain's Got Talent after being released from his contract with Universal.

He performed in the last semi-final where he performed another original song entitled "First Kiss". He received the most votes and was automatically sent through to the final. For the final, he performed "No Name" a second time and placed 5th in the competition, with 4.8% of the vote

=== Post-Britain's Got Talent ===
On 19 May 2012, it was announced O'Shaughnessy had signed a record deal with Sony Music. His first single "No Name" was released on 5 August, and he released his debut mini-album Ryan O'Shaughnessy on 13 August 2012. The mini-album contains six songs which are all penned by O'Shaughnessy himself, which includes the song "First Kiss", which he performed on Britain's Got Talent. On 10 August 2012, he performed in his hometown, meeting the fans and signing copies of his mini-album. On 23 August, he performed "No Name", his debut single, live on This Morning. On 30 August, he announced details of his first UK headline tour and played 11 dates throughout October 2012.

In 2015, O'Shaughnessy released two singles, "Fingertips" and "Evergreen". In early 2016, he released another single, "She Won't Wait". O'Shaughnessy then began working on his debut album, which was projected for release in July 2016.

=== The Hit ===
In July 2013, it was announced that O'Shaughnessy would be one of the artists taking part in the new Irish songwriting competition The Hit, going against his former The Voice coach Brian Kennedy.

The show, which aired on 2 August 2013, saw six songwriters pitching their songs to both artists. In the initial stage each artist had to choose two of these six songs. O'Shaughnessy chose a song called "Blush" by Gavin Doyle and "Who Do You Love?" by Mark Graham and Frances Mitchell. O'Shaughnessy chose to release "Who Do You Love?" to enter the chart battle against Kennedy. O'Shaughnessy won the chart battle with the single charting at No.3 in the Irish Singles Chart beating Kennedy's song "Try" which charted at No.15.

On 30 August 2013 O'Shaughnessy, along with the four other chart battle winners, returned to perform their song live in The O2 for the Grand Finale with the RTÉ Concert Orchestra.

=== Bayview Records ===
In 2015, O'Shaughnessy established Dublin-based record label Bayview Records.

=== Eurovision Song Contest ===
On 31 January 2018, O'Shaughnessy was announced as the Irish representative in the Eurovision Song Contest 2018 with the song "Together". His entry was co-written by O'Shaughnessy with Mark Caplice and Laura Elizabeth Hughes. The song and the artist were internally selected in January 2018 by the Irish broadcaster Raidió Teilifís Éireann (RTÉ) to represent the country at the 2018 contest in Lisbon, Portugal. O'Shaughnessy qualified for the final, after finishing sixth in semi-final 1 with 179 points, making it the first time Ireland qualified to the finals since 2013 with Ryan Dolan. The song eventually finished in 16th place with 136 points.

Ireland's entry was marred with controversy. During the Chinese broadcast of the first semi-final on Mango TV, the Irish entry was edited out of the show, along with the snippets in the recap of all 19 entries. O'Shaughnessy's song was censored due to two male dancers dancing together on-stage. As a result, the EBU terminated its partnership with the Chinese broadcaster, explaining that censorship "is not in line with the EBU's values of universality and inclusivity and its proud tradition of celebrating diversity through music." The termination led to a ban on televising the second semi-final and the grand final in the country. A spokesperson for the broadcaster's parent company Hunan TV said they "weren't aware" of the edits made to the programme. O'Shaughnessy told the BBC in an interview, "they haven't taken this lightly and I think it's a move in the right direction, so I'm happy about it."

In October 2018, O'Shaughnessy appeared in the music video for Ireland's Junior Eurovision entry "IOU", performed by Taylor Hynes. O'Shaughnessy portrayed the father character in the video while former Eurovision winner Niamh Kavanagh portrayed the mother character.

RTÉ announced on 18 May 2021 that O'Shaughnessy would be the Irish spokesperson for the final of that year's contest, giving the results of the Irish jury vote.

In January 2025, it was announced the song ''Fire'' by Galway singer Reylta which was co written by Ryan would be entered in the 2025 Irish Eurovision selection the song finished in 5th place out of 6 entries.

== Discography ==
=== Studio albums ===
Title	Details
Back to Square One	Released: 11 November 2016; Label: Bayview Records; Formats: Digital download, CD

=== Extended plays ===
Title	Details	Peak chart positions	
Title	Details	IRE	UK
Ryan O'Shaughnessy	Released: 13 August 2012; Label: RCA; Formats: Digital download, CD	1	9

=== Singles ===
Title	Year	Peak chart positions					Album
Title	Year	IRE	FRA	SCO	SWE Heat.	UK	Album
"No Name"	2012	3	—	—	—	31	Ryan O'Shaughnessy
"First Kiss"	2012	51	—	—	—	—	Ryan O'Shaughnessy
"Who Do You Love?"	2013	3	—	—	—	—	Non-album singles
"Fingertips"	2015	—	—	—	—	—	Non-album singles
"Evergreen"	2015	—	—	—	—	—	Non-album singles
"She Won't Wait"	2016	—	—	—	—	—	Non-album singles
"Got This Feeling"	2017	—	—	—	—	—	Back to Square One
"Together"	2018	17	168	59	8	— (Note: "Together" did not enter the UK Singles Chart, but peaked at number 52 on the UK Downloads component chart.)	Non-album singles
"Civil War"	2018	—	—	—	—	—	Non-album singles
"100 Ways"	2020	—	—	—	—	—	Non-album singles
"Think About Things"	2020	—	—	—	—	—	Non-album singles
"Lucky One"	2020	—	—	—	—	—	Non-album singles
"Permanent"	2020	—	—	—	—	—	Non-album singles
"Holding My Breath"	2020	—	—	—	—	—	Non-album singles
"Coffee"	2021	—	—	—	—	—	Non-album singles
"What You Got to Lose?"	2023	—	—	—	—	—	Non-album singles
"Let Go"	2024	—	—	—	—	—	Non-album singles
"—" denotes single that did not chart or was not released in that territory.

== Filmography ==
- 2001–2010: Fair City as Mark Halpin (Irish TV series)
- 2012: The Voice of Ireland (series 1) as himself/contestant
- 2012: Britain's Got Talent (series 6) as himself/contestant
- 2013: The Beo Show as himself (5 episodes)
- 2014: Poison Pen as Piers (Irish comedy feature film)
- 2018: Eurovision Song Contest 2018 as himself/contestant

== Notes ==
Awards and achievements
Preceded by Brendan Murray with "Dying to Try"	Ireland in the Eurovision Song Contest; 2018	Succeeded by Sarah McTernan with "22"
