= The Hit (Irish TV series) =

- Genre: Reality television
- Presented by: Aidan Power; Nicky Byrne; Laura Whitmore
- Country of origin: Ireland
- No. of series: 1
- No. of episodes: 7

Production
- Production location: The O_{2} Dublin
- Running time: 60 minutes
- Production company: Vision Independent Productions

Original release
- Network: RTÉ
- Release: 26 July – 30 August 2013

The Hit is an Irish talent show series that began airing on 26 July 2013 on RTÉ One and sees songwriters showcasing their songs to established artists. The artists then battle one another to find the perfect song they can turn into a hit. It was hosted by Aidan Power and Nicky Byrne.

A pilot episode was aired in September 2012 on RTÉ Two hosted by Laura Whitmore. On 15 March 2013, RTÉ announced that the show had been ordered for a full series to be broadcast in the summer.

On 30 August 2013, Finbar Furey was announced the winner of the series, with the song "The Last Great Love Song". Gerry Fleming, the song's songwriter, won the €20,000 prize. The show wasn't as successful as The Voice of Ireland and was cancelled after one series.

RTVE, the Spanish public broadcaster, was rumoured to be considering using the format as the selection process for its entry in the 2015 Eurovision Song Contest.

== Format ==
In each episode, six chosen songwriters pitch their songs to two established artists in "The Pitching Rooms". The two artists go into each room and listen to the song. Upon exiting the artist can "lock in" their choice or leave the choice open. Each artist must lock in two songs.

The artists meet with both songwriters and discuss possible changes to the song to make it more suitable to the artist releasing the song. The artist produces one song and their choice is revealed when they return to the live show to perform their chosen song.

The two artists then enter a "chart battle" where the song chosen by the artist is available for download. The songs are downloaded using primarily an SMS system and are only available via the system for the week following the broadcast. The song which receives the most downloads goes through to the grand finale, where the songs are performed again with the RTÉ Concert Orchestra and viewers then choose "The Song of the Series", thus "The Ultimate Hit". The winning songwriter receives a €20,000 prize.

== Episodes ==
=== Pilot (6 September 2012) ===
- Brian McFadden against Royseven

=== Series 1 (2013) ===
==== Episode 1 (26 July) ====
- The Stunning against Julie Feeney

Songwriters competing on the first episode
Songwriter(s)	Song	Result
Alice Lynskey	"Run and Hide"	The Stunning's choice
Niamh Murphy	"Land's End"	Not chosen
Nigel Place	"Sad Songs"	The Stunning's choice
Christy McGuigan	"I Was Not Expecting To Be Loved"	Not chosen
Gary Burke & Katie Carpenter	"Dimension Me"	Julie's choice
Tommy Moore	"New Tattoo"	Julie's choice

Chart Battle
Artist	Songwriter	Song	Chart No.	Result
The Stunning	Alice Lynskey	"Run and Hide"	6	Qualified
Julie Feeney	Tommy Moore	"New Tattoo"	9	Eliminated

The following week, "Run and Hide" dropped to #77 in the Irish Singles Chart; "New Tattoo" did not chart in the Top 100.

==== Episode 2 (2 August) ====
- Brian Kennedy against Ryan O'Shaughnessy

Songwriters competing on the second episode
Songwriter(s)	Song	Result
Yvonne McCarthy	"You're No Good For Me"	Brian's choice
Sean Redmond	"Try"	Brian's choice
Gavin Doyle	"Blush"	Ryan's choice
Mark Graham & Francis Mitchell	"Who Do You Love?"	Ryan's choice
Paddy Sharkey	"Falling"	Not chosen
Pat Silke	"Dream Be Over"	Not chosen

Chart Battle
Artist	Songwriter(s)	Song	Chart No.	Result
Brian Kennedy	Sean Redmond	"Try"	15	Eliminated
Ryan O'Shaughnessy	Mark Graham & Francis Mitchell	"Who Do You Love?"	3	Qualified

The following week, "Who Do You Love?" dropped to #39 in the Irish Singles Chart; "Try" did not chart in the Top 100.

==== Episode 3 (9 August) ====
- Johnny Logan against Duke Special

Songwriters competing on the third episode
Songwriter	Song	Result
Alan Earls	"Prayin'"	Johnny's choice
Joshua Golding	"You Love Me Anyway"	Duke's choice
Louise Killeen	"Who's to Say It Is"	Not chosen
Lorcan Hughes	"Heaven Here I Am"	Not chosen
Aaron Hackett	"1969"	Duke's choice
Jamie Wilson	"Rain"	Johnny's choice

Chart Battle
Artist	Songwriter	Song	Chart No.	Result
Duke Special	Aaron Hackett	"1969"	5	Eliminated
Johnny Logan	Alain Earls	"Prayin'"	3	Qualified

The following week, "Prayin'" dropped to #90 in the Irish Singles Chart; "1969" did not chart in the Top 100.

==== Episode 4 (16 August) ====
- Samantha Mumba against Republic of Loose

Songwriters competing on the fourth episode
Songwriter(s)	Song	Result
Fiona Harte	"Make Or Break"	Republic of Loose's choice
Mark Keogh & Dave Spiro	"Thinking of You"	Republic of Loose's choice
Liz Seaver	"Somebody Like Me"	Mumba's choice
Simon Bushby	"Georgia"	Mumba's choice
Sandra Clarke	"This Love Ain't Enough"	Not chosen
Declan Landy	"Give A Little Love"	Not chosen

Chart Battle
Artist	Songwriter(s)	Song	Chart No.	Result
Republic of Loose	Mark Keogh & Dave Spiro	"Thinking of You"	16	Eliminated
Samantha Mumba	Liz Seaver	"Somebody Like Me"	5	Qualified

The following week "Somebody Like Me" dropped to #58 in the Irish Singles Chart; "Thinking of You" did not chart in the Top 100.

==== Episode 5 (23 August) ====
- Mundy against Finbar Furey

Songwriters competing on the fifth episode
Songwriter(s)	Song	Result
Andrew Basquille, Padraic Gillian and Eugene Murphy	"Yes To You"	Furey's choice
Jack Ahern	"Hypnotized"	Not chosen
Karen Alice Dunbar	"Waiting For Your Love"	Mundy's choice
Gerry Fleming	"The Last Great Love Song"	Furey's choice
David McShane	"Captured"	Not chosen
Mark Walsh	"Jigsaw Man"	Mundy's choice

Chart Battle
Artist	Songwriter	Song	Chart No.	Result
Mundy	Mark Walsh	"Jigsaw Man"	5	Eliminated
Finbar Furey	Gerry Fleming	"The Last Great Love Song"	1	Qualified

==== Grand Finale (30 August) ====
For the grand finale of the series, the five successful artists returned to perform their song live in the O2, with the RTÉ Concert Orchestra, and the viewers decided who had the ultimate hit via a public vote.

Artist	Song	Result
Finbar Furey	"The Last Great Love Song"	Winner
The Stunning	"Run and Hide"	Runners-up
Ryan O'Shaughnessy	"Who Do You Love?"	Runners-up
Johnny Logan	"Prayin'"	Runners-up
Samantha Mumba	"Somebody Like Me"	Runners-up

== International versions ==
On 20 November 2013, it was announced that RTL 5 would air a Dutch version of The Hit in early 2014. It began on 24 February 2014, hosted by Dennis Weening. The format has also been sold to China, Germany, Finland, Norway, Russia, Spain and Ukraine.

Country	Local title	Presenter(s)	Winners	Channel	Premiere
Netherlands	The Hit	Dennis Weening; Ruud Feltkamp (Backstage)	Season 1, 2014: "Where Do We Go" (Artist: Chuckie feat. Dewi; Songwriter: Robert D Fisher & Dick Kok)	RTL 5	24 February 2014
Norway	The Hit	Marte Stokstad	Season 1, 2014: "The Story of Love" (Artist: Trine Rein; Songwriter: Geir Arne Hansens)	NRK1	5 September 2014
Russia	Хит	Alexander Anatolievich & Ivan Chuikov (Season 2); Margarita Mitrofanova & Yuri Askarov (Season 1)	Season 1, 2013: "V samoe serdtse" (Artist: Sergey Lazarev; Songwriter: Alexander Penkin); Season 2, 2014: "Davai so mnoy za zvezdami" (Artist: Natali; Songwriter: Alisa Bushueva)	Rossiya 1	6 September 2013
Spain	Hit - la canción	Jaime Cantizano	Season 1, 2015: "Me da igual" (Artist: Rosa López; Songwriter: Alfonso Bravo & David Barral)	La 1	2 January 2015
