= Somebody Like Me (Samantha Mumba song) =

2013 single by Samantha Mumba

Single by Samantha Mumba
- Released: 16 August 2013
- Genre: Pop
- Length: 3:32
- Label: Vision Independent Productions
- Songwriter(s): Liz Seaver

Samantha Mumba singles chronology
"Stay in the Middle" (2009)	"Somebody Like Me" (2013)	"Only Just Begun" (2014)

Audio video
- "Somebody Like Me" on YouTube

"Somebody Like Me" is a song written by Liz Seaver from Skerries, County Dublin and recorded by Irish singer Samantha Mumba and released in association with RTÉ's music entertainment series The Hit. The song peaked at number 5 on the Irish charts.

Mumba told the Herald "What was foremost on my mind was showcasing the song for the writer. I really wanted to do a good job for them and I'm delighted it all came together"

== Track listing ==
Digital download
No.	Title	Length
1.	"Somebody Like Me"	3:32

== Charts ==
Chart (2013)	Peak position
Ireland (IRMA)	5
