= No Name (Ryan O'Shaughnessy song) =

Single by Ryan O'Shaughnessy

from the album Ryan O'Shaughnessy
- Released: 5 August 2012
- Recorded: 2012 Peermusic Studios
- Genre: Pop, indie folk
- Length: 2:57
- Label: Sony Music Entertainment, RCA Records
- Songwriter(s): Ryan O'Shaughnessy
- Producer(s): Jonas Westling

Ryan O'Shaughnessy singles chronology
"No Name" (2012)	"Who Do You Love?" (2013)

"No Name" is a song by Irish singer-songwriter Ryan O'Shaughnessy, released on 5 August 2012 as the lead single from his extended play Ryan O'Shaughnessy (2012). The song entered the Irish Singles Chart at number 3 and the UK Singles Chart at number 31.

He performed it initially as an audition in 2012 during season 6 of Britain's Got Talent. He said it was his own words and composition and he had chosen this song as it meant so much to him. He explained it was about his "best mate" for six years ever since he was thirteen. However he refused to name the person despite persistent questions about the name by the three member jury consisting of David Walliam, Simon Cowell and Alesha Dixon. He finished in fifth place during the competition.

== Music video ==
A music video to accompany the release of "No Name" was first released onto YouTube on 18 June 2012 at a total length of two minutes and fifty-one seconds.

== Track listing ==
Digital download
No.	Title	Length
1.	"No Name"	2:57
2.	"She Talks to Angels"	4:11

== Chart performance ==
Chart (2012)	Peak position
Ireland (IRMA)	3
UK Singles (OCC)	31

== Release history ==
Region	Date	Format	Label
Ireland	5 August 2012	Digital Download	Sony Music Entertainment, RCA Records
United Kingdom	5 August 2012	Digital Download	Sony Music Entertainment, RCA Records
