= Prayin' (Johnny Logan song) =

Single by Johnny Logan
- Released: 9 August 2013
- Genre: rock
- Length: 3:49
- Label: Vision Independent Productions
- Songwriter(s): Alan Earls

Johnny Logan singles chronology
"Last Days of Beautiful" (2010)	"Prayin'" (2013)	"The Way She Looks At You" (2015)

"Prayin'" is a song written by Alan Earls from Greystones, County Wicklow and recorded by Australian-born Irish singer and composer Johnny Logan. The song was released in association with RTÉ's music entertainment series The Hit. The song peaked at number 3 on the Irish charts and number 1 on the Irish rock chart.

Following the chart position, Logan spoke to the Irish Independent saying "For a person who has been around as long as I have, this is incredible. I feel like the singer Bill Nighy plays in the film Love Actually, the guy who tops the charts by accident."

== Reception ==
Padraig Muldoon from WiwiBloggs said “"Prayin'" is completely different to his previous work. It's an anthemic rock song, which you could easily imagine being performed to a packed stadium. After a few listens it's very hard not to sing along. And despite its somber themes of death and loss it is oddly uplifting.”

== Track listing ==
Digital download
No.	Title	Length
1.	"Prayin'"	3:49

== Charts ==
Chart (2013)	Peak position
Ireland (IRMA)	3
