= The Night We Met (HomeTown song) =

Single by HomeTown

from the album HomeTown
- Released: 23 October 2015
- Genre: Soft rock
- Length: 3:41
- Label: Sony Music Entertainment
- Songwriter(s): Liam Payne, MoZella, Matt Radosevich, Jamie Scott

HomeTown singles chronology
"Cry for Help" (2015)	"The Night We Met" (2015)	"Roses" (2016)

Music video
- "The Night We Met" on YouTube

"The Night We Met" is a song from Irish boy band HomeTown. The song was released in Ireland as a digital download on 23 October 2015 through Sony Music Entertainment. It was released as the third single from their self-titled debut studio album. The song has peaked at number 59 on the Irish Singles Chart.

== Reception ==
Sophie Bird from Flavour Mag said "Jamie Scott and One Direction’s Liam Payne worked with HomeTown on "The Night We Met"." adding "This song is exceptionally good.. [it] shows the bands incredible talents."

== Music video ==
A music video to accompany the release of "The Night We Met" was first released onto YouTube on 19 November 2015 at a total length of three minutes and fifty-four seconds.

== Track listing ==
Album version
No.	Title	Length
1.	"The Night We Met"	3:41

== Charts ==
=== Weekly charts ===
Chart (2015)	Peak position
Ireland (IRMA)	59

== Release history ==
Region	Date	Format	Label
Ireland	23 October 2015	Digital download	Sony Music Entertainment
