= Ryan O'Shaughnessy (EP) =

EP by Ryan O'Shaughnessy
- Released: 13 August 2012
- Recorded: 2012 Peermusic Studios
- Genre: Pop
- Length: 20:47
- Label: RCA Records; Sony Music; Syco
- Producer: Jonas Westling

Ryan O'Shaughnessy chronology
Ryan O'Shaughnessy (2012)	Back to Square One (2016)

Singles from Ryan O'Shaughnessy
- 1. "No Name" Released: 5 August 2012

Ryan O'Shaughnessy is the first EP by Irish singer-songwriter Ryan O'Shaughnessy released on 13 August 2012 in the United Kingdom. The EP peaked at number 1 on the Irish Albums Chart. The album includes the single "No Name".

== Singles ==
"No Name" was released as the lead single from the EP on 5 August 2012. The single peaked at number 3 on the Irish Singles Chart.

== About the song writers and composers ==
"Together" was co-written by Ryan O'Shaughnessy, Mark Caplice, and Laura Elizabeth Hughes. The track was written for the Eurovision Song Contest by the trio while collaborating at The Nucleus—an Irish songwriting collective and creative space established by Hamlet Sweeney. The Nucleus introduces a globally inspired, team-based approach to songwriting in Ireland.

Ryan expressed his excitement, saying: “As one of the co-creators of 'Together', I’m thrilled that it’s been selected to represent Ireland at Eurovision 2018. Being invited to perform the song for my country is an incredible privilege. I aim to make Ireland proud by delivering a performance and song that recall the heartfelt moments of 'Rock and Roll Kids'. I’m truly looking forward to stepping on that stage and sharing something real with millions of viewers.”

== Critical reception ==
Digital Spy gave the EP a positive review stating, "Listening to his self-titled EP – a taster of what will follow on his debut album – it's easy to see why. Much like his contemporary, O'Shaughnessy is a fresh-faced singer-songwriter-guitar-player with a heavy heart. But while Sheeran regularly delves into the nastiness of drugs, miscarriages and booze, he remains in the tight, well-worn confines of love and relationships. Lead track 'No Name' – about an unrequited crush – remains as fresh and genuine as it did during its first outing earlier this year, while 'First Kiss' carries the same boy-next-door innocence without feeling overly contrived. 'Lost In You' and 'Sofa Bed' swerve dangerously close to borderline obsessive, but given they were written pre-BGT, something tell us he'll have a very different perspective come the full album."

== Track listing ==
No.	Title	Writer(s)	Producer(s)	Length
1.	"No Name"	Ryan O'Shaughnessy	Westling	2:57
2.	"Time Stands Still"	Ryan O'Shaughnessy	Westling	3:42
3.	"Sofa Bed"	Ryan O'Shaughnessy	Westling	3:36
4.	"Lost in You"	Ryan O'Shaughnessy	Westling	3:36
5.	"First Kiss"	Ryan O'Shaughnessy	Westling	3:15
6.	"Waiting"	Ryan O'Shaughnessy	Westling	3:41

== Chart performance ==
Chart (2012)	Peak position
Irish Albums Chart	1
UK Albums Chart	9

== Release history ==
Region	Date	Format	Label
United Kingdom	10 August 2012	Digital download	RCA Records
United Kingdom	13 August 2012	CD	RCA Records
