= HomeTown (band) =

Irish boy band

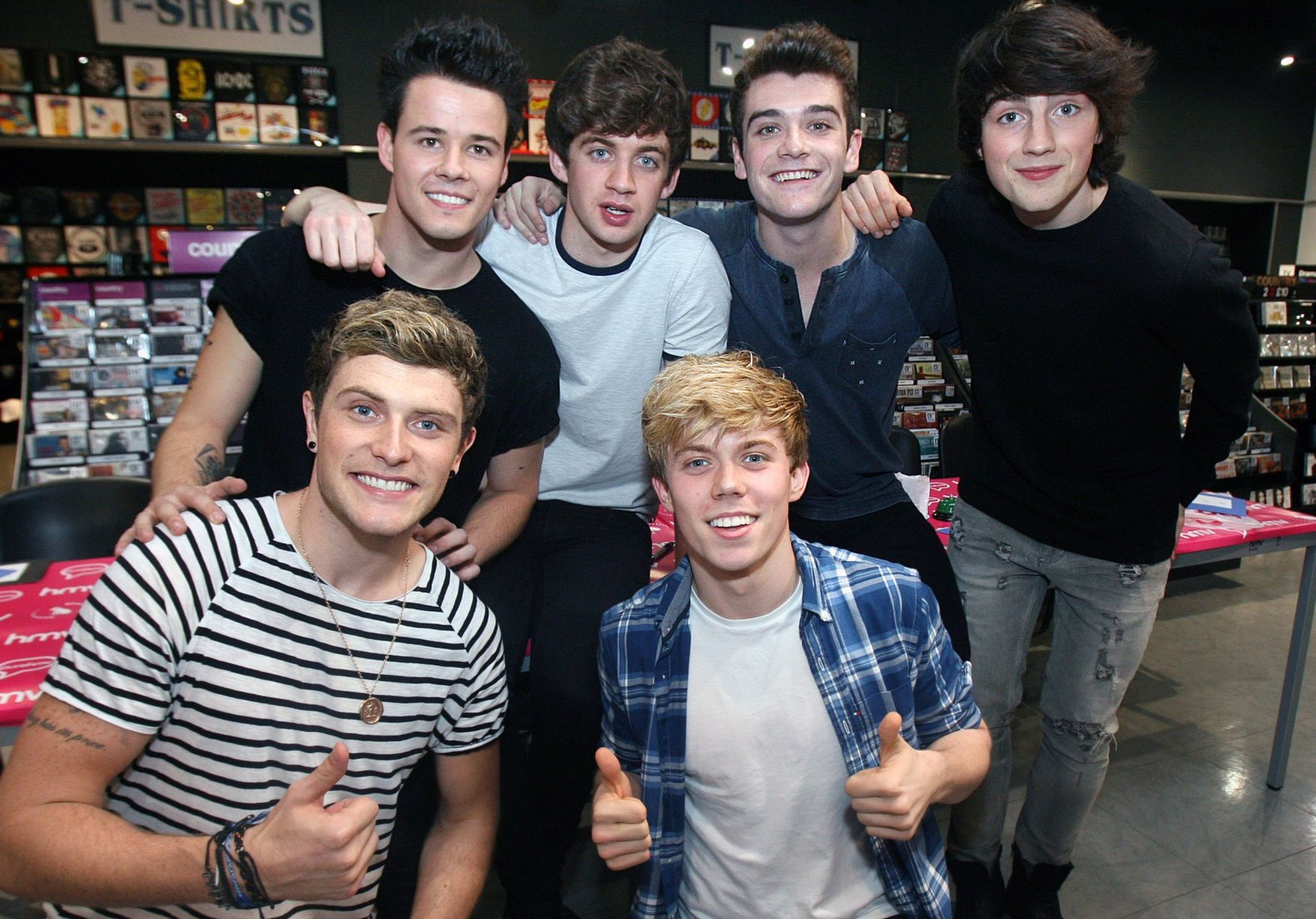
- HomeTown in 2015. Clockwise from left: Dayl Cronin, Cian Morrin, Ryan McLoughlin, Brendan Murray, Josh Gray and Dean Gibbons.

Background information
- Origin: Ireland
- Genres: Pop
- Years active: 2014–2016
- Labels: RCA Records
- Past members: Dayl Croninn; Dean Gibbon; Josh Gray; Brendan Murray; Cian Morrin; Ryan MacLoughlin; Gareth Borrow

HomeTown was a six-piece Irish boy band, formed and managed by Louis Walsh. They were signed to RCA Records, a division of Sony Music Entertainment UK.

The vocal group is made up of singers from Ireland, with Walsh auditioning a thousand singers for the band. HomeTown consisted of Cian Morrin, Dayl Cronin, Dean Gibbons, Josh Gray, Ryan McLoughlin, and Brendan Murray.

The band opened for Olly Murs, McBusted and The Vamps on UK and Ireland tours in 2015 and 2016.

== Career ==
=== Formation ===
The band was originally composed of five members, Gareth Borrow (Derry), Ryan McLoughlin (Newbridge), Brendan Murray (Galway), Cian Morrin (Castlebar) and Dayl Cronin (Clonmel). The five were picked out of a thousand applicants for a band project by Walsh.

Borrow was later removed from the band and Walsh brought in two new members, Josh Gray (Blessington) and Dean Gibbons (Tallaght), turning HomeTown into a six-piece band.

=== 2014–16: Debut album ===
Their first single, "Where I Belong", debuted at number one in Ireland, becoming the fastest-selling single from a debut act and the fastest-selling single from an Irish artist in 2014. The single was written by Kodaline. The band's second single, "Cry for Help", was released on 27 March 2015 in Ireland. The song also reached number one on the Irish Singles Chart. The band began a signing tour around Ireland shortly after. They released their first single "Where I Belong" in the UK on 24 July 2015, with 4 September as the impact date (the day a track is meant to start receiving significant airplay).

On 23 October 2015, HomeTown released their third single "The Night We Met", which was written by Liam Payne of One Direction and Jamie Scott. On 20 November 2015, HomeTown released their self-titled debut album, which debuted at number 4 on the Irish Albums Chart. In August 2016, the band released "Roses" as the fourth and final single from the album. In October 2016, the band made their European debut in Madrid, Spain, where they played to a sold-out Barclaycard Center at the Coca-Cola Music Experience festival, alongside other acts such as Meghan Trainor and Bea Miller.

In December 2016, HomeTown announced that its members would be taking a break from music to pursue individual projects. Shortly after, Brendan Murray was announced as the Irish representative in the Eurovision Song Contest 2017. Dayl Cronin took part in the Irish version of Dancing With the Stars in 2017.

== Members ==
- Brendan Murray (born 16 November 1996), Murray represented Ireland in Eurovision in 2017 in Kyiv, Ukraine, but failed to qualify for the grand final. He competed on the fifteenth series of The X Factor and was eliminated in the semifinals.
- Dayl Cronin (born 8 December 1993). Cronin started his own dance school in Longs Yard, Tower Street, Cork
- Dean Gibbons (born 17 February 1994)
- Josh Gray (born 28 March 1997) released 'We Should Run' in May 2018.
- Ryan McLoughlin (born 27 January 1994) McLoughlin released single 'Nobody like You' on 25 August 2017.
- Cian Morrin (born 2 October 1994)

== Discography ==
=== Studio albums ===
| Title | Album details | Peak chart positions |
| Title | Album details | IRE |
|---|---|---|
| HomeTown | Released: 20 November 2015; Label: RCA Records; Format: CD, digital download | 4 |

=== Singles ===
| Title | Year | Peak chart positions | Album |
| Title | Year | IRL | Album |
|---|---|---|---|
| "Where I Belong" | 2014 | 1 | HomeTown |
| "Cry for Help" | 2015 | 1 | HomeTown |
| "The Night We Met" | 2015 | 59 | HomeTown |
| "Roses" | 2016 | — | HomeTown |
"—" denotes a single that did not chart or was not released.

== Tour ==
=== Headlining ===
- Sense Club, Cookstown – 29 May 2015
- Open Air Theatre, Scarborough – 20 June 2015
- Bents Park, South Shields – 12 July 2015 – (2pm)
- Westonbirt Arbertoreum, Tetbury – 12 July 2015 – (8pm)
- Delapre Park, London – 17 July 2015
- Edinburgh Castle, Edinburgh – 18 July 2015
- Feile Party in the Park (matinee), Belfast – 2 August 2015
- Greencastle Community Centre (evening), Donegal – 2 August 2015
- Culloville Community Centre, Newry – 7 August 2015
- Lytham Green, Lytham – 8 August 2015
- Vicar Street, Dublin – 21 August 2015
- Opera House, Cork – 12 September 2015
- UCH, Limerick – 13 September 2015
- Seapoint, Galway – 26 September 2015
- Great Northern, Bundoran – 23 October 2015
- Clanard Court, Kildare – 25 October 2015
- Headfort Arms, Kells – 26 October 2015
- Tullamore Court, County Offaly – 27 October 2015
- TLT Theatre, Louth – 28 October 2015
- Minella, Clonmel – 31 October 2015
- O'Connell Street, Dublin – 29 November 2015
- Vicar Street, Dublin – 4 December 2015
- Mount Errigal, Letterkenny – 27 December 2015
- Claremorris Town Hall, Claremorris – 28 December 2015
- Breffni Arms, Arvagh – 29 December 2015
- Clarnard Court, Kildare – 1 January 2016
- Radisson Athlone, Athlone – 2 January 2016
- INEC, Kerry – 3 January 2016
- Mcgettigans, Abu Dhabi, United Arab Emirates – 17 March 2016 – (5pm)
- Mcgettigans JLT, Dubai, United Arab Emirates – 17 March 2016 – (9pm)
- Jersey Opera House, Jersey Channel Islands – 21 May 2016
- Jacksons Hotel, Donegal – 30 December 2016– Cancelled

=== Supporting ===
- Olly Murs – Never Been Better Tour (2015)
- The Vamps – The Vamps UK Summer Tour (2015)
- McBusted – Most Excellent Adventure Tour (2015)
- The Vamps – Wake Up UK Arena Tour (2016)

=== Other gigs ===
- Childline (2014)
- Coca-Cola Music Experience (2016)
- Beaulieu Convent School, Jersey Channel Islands (2016)
