= HomeTown (HomeTown album) =

Studio album by HomeTown
- Released: 20 November 2015
- Recorded: 2014/15
- Genre: Pop rock
- Length: 38:16
- Label: Sony Music Entertainment

Singles from HomeTown
- 1. "Where I Belong" Released: 28 November 2014; 2. "Cry for Help" Released: 27 March 2015; 3. "The Night We Met" Released: 23 October 2015; 4. "Roses" Released: August 2016

HomeTown is the only studio album by Irish band HomeTown. The album was released in Ireland on 20 November 2015 through Sony Music Entertainment. The album peaked to number 4 on the Irish Albums Chart. The album includes the singles "Where I Belong", "Cry for Help", "The Night We Met" and "Roses".

== Reception ==
Sophie Bird from Flavour Mag called it "an outstanding album for their fans."

== Singles ==
- "Where I Belong" was released as the lead single from the album on 28 November 2014. The song peaked at number 1 on the Irish Singles Chart.
- "Cry for Help" was released as the second single from the album on 27 March 2015. The song peaked at number 1 on the Irish Singles Chart.
- "The Night We Met" was released as the third single from the album on 23 October 2015. The song peaked at number 59 on the Irish Singles Chart.
- "Roses" was released as the fourth and final single from the album in August 2016.

== Track listing ==
No.	Title	Writer(s)	Length
1.	"Where I Belong"	prod. by Jamie Scott & Toby Smith	3:55
2.	"Cry for Help"	prod. by James F Reynolds & Phil Cook (Producer)	3:10
3.	"The Night We Met"	prod. by Matt Rad	3:41
4.	"I Wrote This for You"	prod. by Glen herlihy, James foley & Robert Grace	3:04
5.	"Note to Self"		3:58
6.	"Wanted"	prod. by Glen herlihy, James foley & Robert Grace	3:45
7.	"Jigsaw Dreams"	prod. by Glen herlihy, James foley & Robert Grace	2:48
8.	"Love Goes On"	prod. by James F Reynolds & Josh Wilkinson	2:58
9.	"Roses"	prod. by Jamie Scott & Toby Smith	3:28
10.	"Standing in the Rain"	prod. by Jamie Scott & Toby Smith	3:36
11.	"For Your Love"	prod. by Glen herlihy, James foley & Robert Grace	3:53

== Weekly charts ==
Chart (2015)	Peak position
Irish Albums (IRMA)	4

== Release history ==
Region	Date	Format	Label
Ireland	20 November 2015	Digital download	Sony Music Entertainment
