= Who Do You Love? (Ryan O'Shaughnessy song) =

Single by Ryan O'Shaughnessy
- Released: 2 August 2013
- Recorded: 2013
- Genre: Pop
- Length: 3:42
- Label: Vision Independent Productions
- Songwriter(s): Ryan O'Shaughnessy, Frances Mitchell, Mark Graham.

Ryan O'Shaughnessy singles chronology
"No Name" (2012)	"Who Do You Love?" (2013)	"Fingertips" (2015)

"Who Do You Love?" is a song by Irish singer-songwriter Ryan O'Shaughnessy, written by Frances Mitchell and Mark Graham, released in Ireland on 2 August 2013. The song entered the Irish Singles Chart at number 3, making it his second Top 5 single in Ireland.

== Track listing ==
Digital download
No.	Title	Length
1.	"Who Do You Love?"	3:42

== Chart performance ==
=== Weekly charts ===
Chart (2013)	Peak position
Ireland (IRMA)	3

== Release history ==
Region	Date	Format	Label
Ireland	2 August 2013	Digital Download	Vision Independent Productions
