= Where I Belong (HomeTown song) =

Single by HomeTown

from the album HomeTown
- Released: 28 November 2014
- Recorded: 2014
- Genre: Soft rock
- Length: 3:55
- Label: Sony Music Entertainment

HomeTown singles chronology
"Where I Belong" (2014)	"Cry for Help" (2015)

Music video
- "Where I Belong" on YouTube

"Where I Belong" is the debut single from Irish boyband HomeTown. The song was released in Ireland as a digital download on 28 November 2014 through Sony Music Entertainment. It was released as the lead single from their self-titled debut studio album. The song has peaked at number 1 on the Irish Singles Chart. An acoustic version was released on 29 August 2015, and a remix on 30 August 2015.

== Reception ==
Sophie Bird from Flavour Mag said "Where I Belong" is a fast catchy song that everyone will love! It’s one of these songs where you’ll learn the lyrics just by listening to it once."

== Music video ==
A music video to accompany the release of "Where I Belong" was first released onto YouTube on 17 July 2015 at a total length of three minutes and fifty-four seconds.

== Track listing ==
Digital download - Radio Edit
No.	Title	Length
1.	"Where I Belong"	3:55

Digital download - Acoustic
No.	Title	Length
1.	"Where I Belong"	4:08

Digital download - Steve Smart Remix
No.	Title	Length
1.	"Where I Belong"	3:15

== Chart performance ==
=== Weekly charts ===
Chart (2014)	Peak position
Ireland (IRMA)	1

== Release history ==
Region	Date	Format	Label
Ireland	28 November 2014	Digital download	Sony Music Entertainment
