= Cry for Help (HomeTown song) =

Single by HomeTown

from the album HomeTown
- Released: 27 March 2015
- Genre: Soft rock
- Length: 3:09
- Label: Sony Music Entertainment
- Songwriter(s): Iain James, Tom Barnes, Pete Kelleher, Ben Kohn

HomeTown singles chronology
"Where I Belong" (2014)	"Cry for Help" (2015)	"The Night We Met" (2015)

Music video
- "Cry for Help" on YouTube

"Cry for Help" is a song from Irish boyband HomeTown. The song was released in Ireland as a digital download on 27 March 2015 through Sony Music Entertainment. It was released as the second single from their self-titled debut studio album. The song peaked at number 1 on the Irish Singles Chart, as of 2020 the most recent Irish act to achieve the feat.

== Reception ==
Sophie Bird from Flavour Mag said ""Cry for Help" is an exceptional song, proving these lads talents." adding it's one of her favourites from the album.

== Music video ==
A music video to accompany the release of "Cry for Help" was first released onto YouTube on 26 March 2015 at a total length of three minutes and eleven seconds.

== Track listing ==
Digital download
No.	Title	Length
1.	"Cry for Help"	3:09

== Chart performance ==
Chart (2015)	Peak position
Ireland (IRMA)	1

== Release history ==
Region	Date	Format	Label
Ireland	27 March 2015	Digital download	Sony Music Entertainment
