= Sarah McTernan =

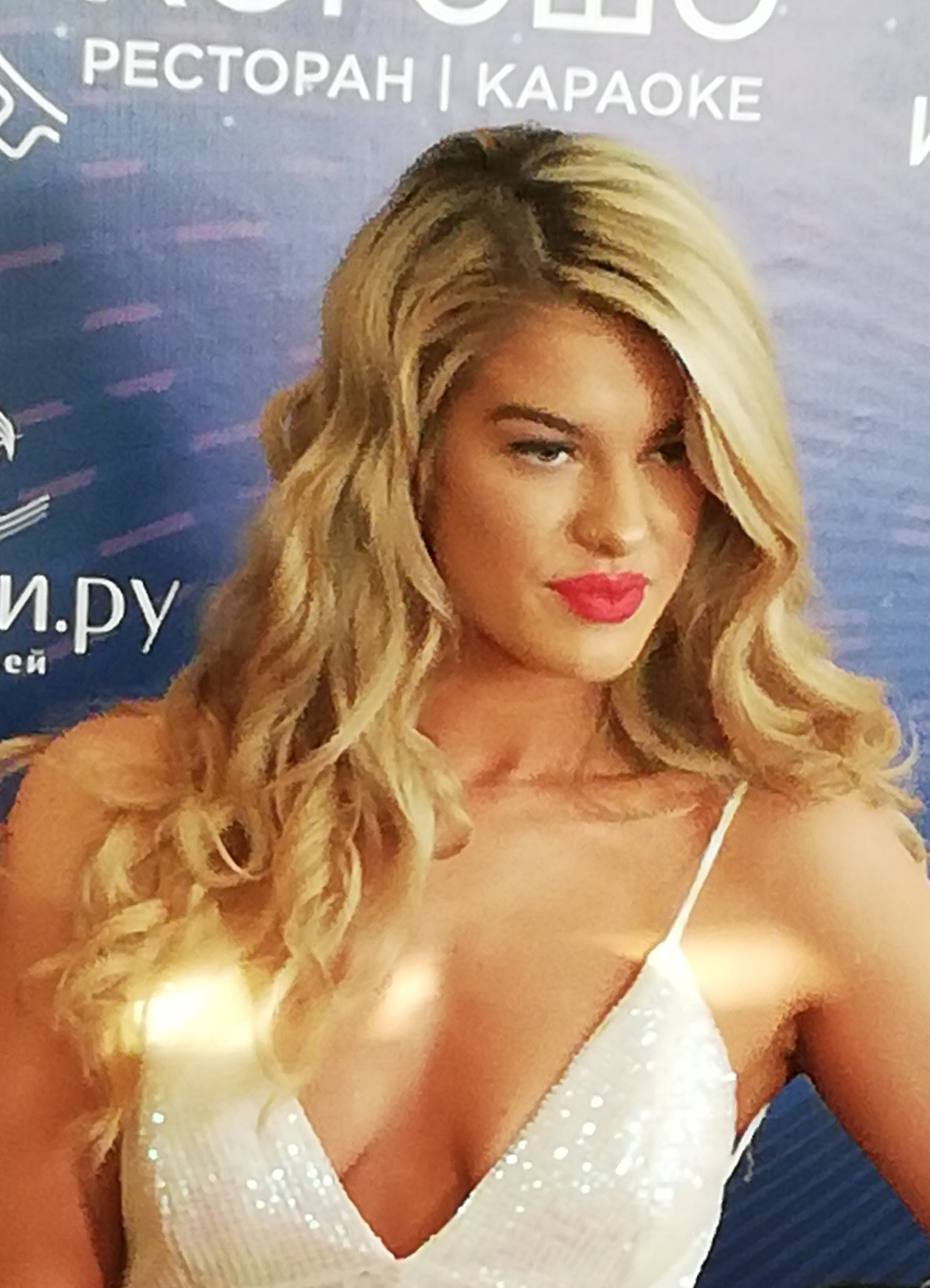
- Sarah McTernan at a Eurovision pre-party

Background information
- Born: 11 March 1994 (age 32)
- Origin: Scarriff, County Clare, Ireland
- Genre: Pop
- Occupations: Musician, singer-songwriter
- Instrument: Vocals
- Years active: 2014–present

Sarah McTernan (born 11 March 1994) is an Irish singer-songwriter from Scarriff, County Clare. She is known for taking third place in the fourth season of The Voice of Ireland in April 2015. She represented Ireland in the Eurovision Song Contest 2019 with the song "22".

== Early and personal life ==
McTernan is an only child. After graduating in 2011, she took a pre-nursing course in Ennis, County Clare. She then went on to study music technology at Limerick Institute of Technology for several months. She took a break from education and continued to work as a retail employee in Penneys. She plays guitar, piano and tin whistle. In September 2014, she enrolled in University of Limerick to study Voice and Dance, but had to defer until September 2015.

== Music career ==
=== The JEDS ===
In November 2014, after getting through the blind auditions on The Voice of Ireland without ever doing any gigs, McTernan set up a band to gain experience with performing. The four-piece band was made up of guitarist Dwayne Mann, drummer John Moroney, bassist Declan Larkin and McTernan on vocals.

=== The Voice of Ireland ===
McTernan entered The Voice of Ireland in 2015. At her blind audition, she sang "Who You Are", for which all four judges turned their chairs. She then chose to go on S Club 7 star, Rachel Stevens' team. For "The Battle" show she competed against Tara Gannon Carr. They performed "Changing" by Sigma, featuring Paloma Faith. Stevens decided to send McTernan through to the Live Knockouts. McTernan sang "Ghost" by Ella Henderson and was up against Paul Taylor and Cian O'Melia. Stevens decided to send Sarah through to the Live Shows while Taylor and O'Melia got sent home. In the first live show, McTernan sang "What I Did For Love" by David Guetta featuring Emeli Sande. McTernan came third, losing out to Emma Humber in second place and Patrick James in first.

In 2018 McTernan applied to be part of an online vote to represent San Marino in the Eurovision Song Contest. At the time McTernan said, "Obviously you want to represent your own country but this is a massive opportunity, it would be amazing to be part of the Eurovision."

=== Eurovision Song Contest 2019 ===
On 8 March 2019, McTernan was announced by RTÉ as the Irish representative for the Eurovision Song Contest 2019 in Tel Aviv, Israel. She performed the song "22" in the second semi-final and failed to qualify for the final. It was later revealed that she finished last (18th out of 18) in the semi-final, scoring 16 points.

=== Later projects ===
With plans to release an EP in the future, McTernan released her new single "Loving You" on 5 February 2021. The song is a collaboration with HalfTraxx, and was played for the first time on Spin South West Radio. The song received positive reviews, reaching number 2 on iTunes (number 1 on iTunes pop charts) and peaked at number 14 on the official Irish homegrown charts. McTernan is credited with writing the song's lyrics, as well as the vocals.

== Discography ==
=== Singles ===
Title	Year	Album
"Eye of the Storm"	2016	Non-album singles
"22"	2019	Non-album singles
"Loving You" (with HalfTraxx)	2020	Non-album singles
"Close My Eyes"	2021	Non-album singles
"Heavy on My Heart"	2021	Non-album singles
"Gotta Get Out"	2022	Non-album singles
"Let You In"	2022	Non-album singles
"You Don't Know Me" (with MARTYY)	2022	Non-album singles

Awards and achievements
Preceded by Ryan O'Shaughnessy with "Together"	Ireland in the Eurovision Song Contest; 2019	Succeeded by Lesley Roy with "Story of My Life"
