= Ireland in the Eurovision Song Contest 2017 =

- Eurovision Song Contest 2017
- Participating broadcaster: Raidió Teilifís Éireann (RTÉ)
- Country: Ireland
- Selection process: Internal selection
- Announcement date: Artist: 16 December 2016; Song: 10 March 2017

Competing entry
- Song: "Dying to Try"
- Artist: Brendan Murray
- Songwriters: Jörgen Elofsson; James Newman

Placement
- Semi-final result: Failed to qualify (13th)

Participation chronology

Ireland was represented at the Eurovision Song Contest 2017 with the song "Dying to Try", written by Jörgen Elofsson and James Newman, and performed by Brendan Murray. The Irish participating broadcaster, Raidió Teilifís Éireann (RTÉ), internally selected its entry for the contest. Murray's internal selection was announced on 16 December 2016, while "Dying to Try" was presented on 10 March 2017.

Ireland was drawn to compete in the second semi-final of the Eurovision Song Contest which took place on 11 May 2017. Performing during the show in position 9, "Dying to Try" was not announced among the top 10 entries of the second semi-final and therefore did not qualify to compete in the final. It was later revealed that Ireland placed thirteenth out of the 18 participating countries in the semi-final with 86 points.

== Background ==
Prior to the 2017 contest, Raidió Teilifís Éireann (RTÉ) and its predecessor national broadcasters have participated in the Eurovision Song Contest representing Ireland forty-nine times since RÉ's first entry in 1965. They have won the contest a record seven times in total. Their first win came in 1970, with "All Kinds of Everything" performed by Dana. Ireland holds the record for being the only country to win the contest three times in a row (in 1992, 1993, and 1994), as well as having the only three-time winner (Johnny Logan, who won in 1980 as a singer, 1987 as a singer-songwriter, and again in 1992 as a songwriter). The Irish entries in 2014, "Heartbeat" performed by Can-linn featuring Kasey Smith, in 2015, "Playing with Numbers" performed by Molly Sterling, and in 2016, "Sunlight" performed by Nicky Byrne all failed to qualify to the final.

As part of its duties as participating broadcaster, RTÉ organises the selection of its entry in the Eurovision Song Contest and broadcasts the event in the country. The broadcaster confirmed its intentions to participate at the 2017 contest on 24 May 2016. From 2008 to 2015, RTÉ had set up the national final Eurosong to choose both the song and performer to compete at Eurovision for Ireland, with both the public and regional jury groups involved in the selection, while RTÉ held an internal selection in 2016 to choose the artist and song. For the 2017 contest, RTÉ internally selected both the artist and song.

== Before Eurovision ==
=== Internal selection ===
On 16 December 2016, RTÉ announced during the RTÉ One Friday night programme The Late Late Show that they had internally selected Brendan Murray to represent Ireland in the Eurovision Song Contest 2017. Murray was a former member of the Irish boy band HomeTown. Unconfirmed rumours of Murray's selection as the Irish contestant, proposed by music manager Louis Walsh who was invited by RTÉ to select and mentor an artist for the contest, were published by Irish media the same day the announcement occurred.

Along with the announcement that Murray would represent Ireland on 16 December 2016, a song submission period was opened until 16 January 2017. In addition to the public submissions, RTÉ reserved the right to approach established composers to submit songs. At the closing of the deadline, 330 songs were received. The song to be performed by Murray was selected through two phases; the first phase involved a six-member jury panel with members appointed by RTÉ reviewing all of the submissions and shortlisting ten songs, while the second phase involved Louis Walsh selecting the song in consultation with the broadcaster. The members of the jury that selected the shortlist of songs consisted of former contest winners Linda Martin and Niamh Kavanagh, Irish Head of Delegation Michael Kealy, Irish Assistant Head of Delegation Dympna Clerkin, musician Jim Sheridan and Sony Music Ireland general manager Patrick Hughes. The selected song "Dying to Try", written by Jörgen Elofsson and James Newman, was presented on 10 March 2017 during the RTÉ 2fm programme The Nicky Byrne Show with Jenny Greene. The music video was released the same day on YouTube.

=== Promotion ===
Brendan Murray made several appearances across Europe to specifically promote "Dying to Try" as the Irish Eurovision entry. Between 3 and 6 April, Brendan Murray took part in promotional activities in Tel Aviv, Israel and performed during the Israel Calling event held at the Ha'teatron venue. On 14 April, Murray performed during the Eurovision in Concert event which was held at the Melkweg venue in Amsterdam, Netherlands and hosted by Cornald Maas and Selma Björnsdóttir. On 15 April, Murray performed during the Eurovision Spain Pre-Party, which was held at the Sala La Riviera venue in Madrid, Spain.

== At Eurovision ==
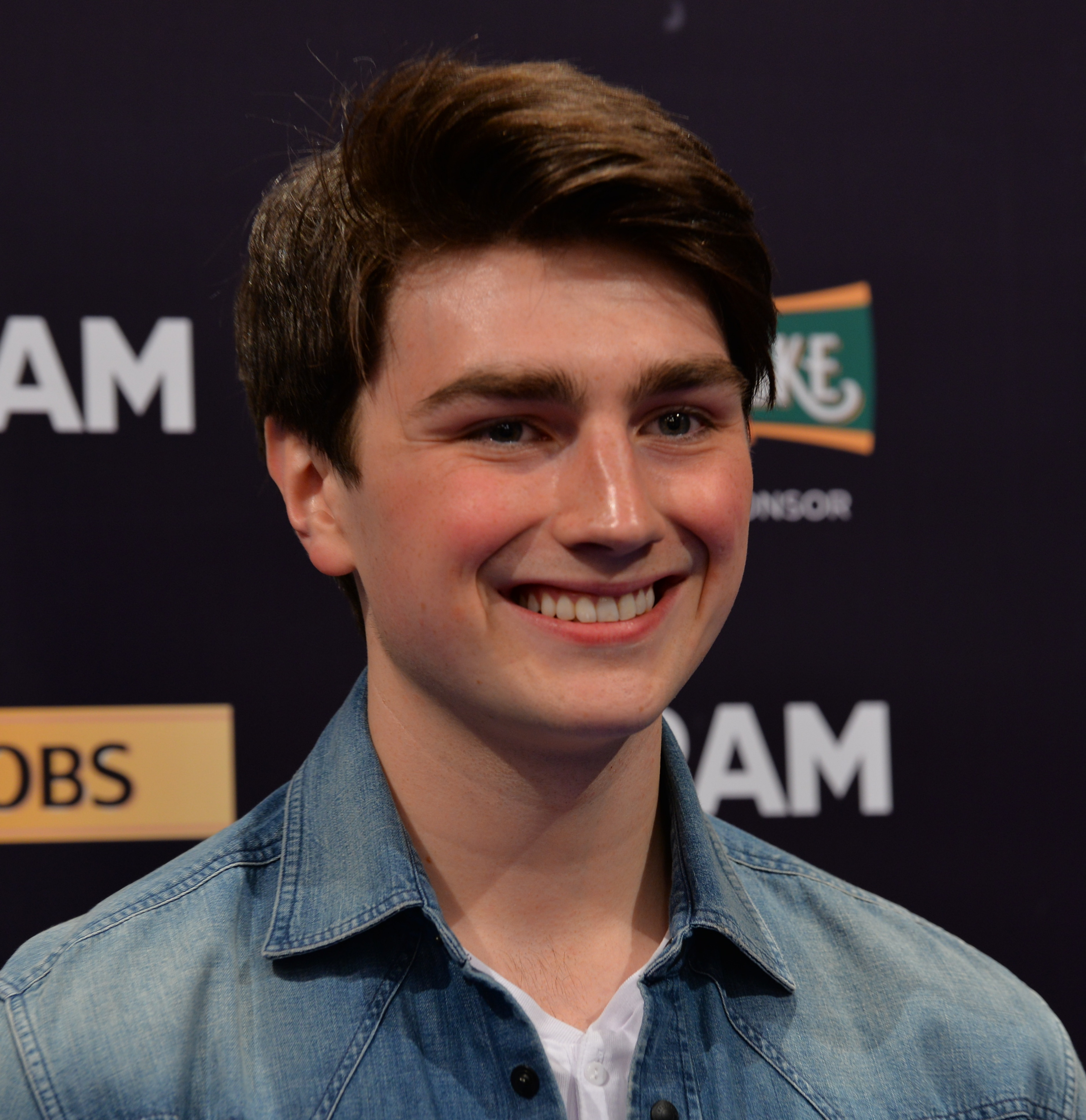
Brendan Murray during a press meet and greet

According to Eurovision rules, all nations with the exceptions of the host country and the "Big Five" (France, Germany, Italy, Spain and the United Kingdom) are required to qualify from one of two semi-finals in order to compete for the final; the top ten countries from each semi-final progress to the final. The European Broadcasting Union (EBU) split up the competing countries into six different pots based on voting patterns from previous contests, with countries with favourable voting histories put into the same pot. On 31 January 2017, an allocation draw was held which placed each country into one of the two semi-finals, as well as which half of the show they would perform in. Ireland was placed into the second semi-final, to be held on 11 May 2017, and was scheduled to perform in the first half of the show.

Once all the competing songs for the 2017 contest had been released, the running order for the semi-finals was decided by the shows' producers rather than through another draw, so that similar songs were not placed next to each other. Ireland was set to perform in position 10, following the entry from Denmark and before the entry from San Marino. However, following Russia's withdrawal from the contest on 13 April and subsequent removal from the running order of the second semi-final, Ireland's performing position shifted to 9.

In Ireland, the two semi-finals were broadcast on RTÉ2 and the final was broadcast on RTÉ One with all three shows featuring commentary by Marty Whelan. The second semi-final and the final were also broadcast via radio on RTÉ Radio 1 with commentary by Neil Doherty and Zbyszek Zalinski. The Irish spokesperson, who announced the top 12-point score awarded by the Irish jury during the final, was former contestant Nicky Byrne.

=== Semi-final ===
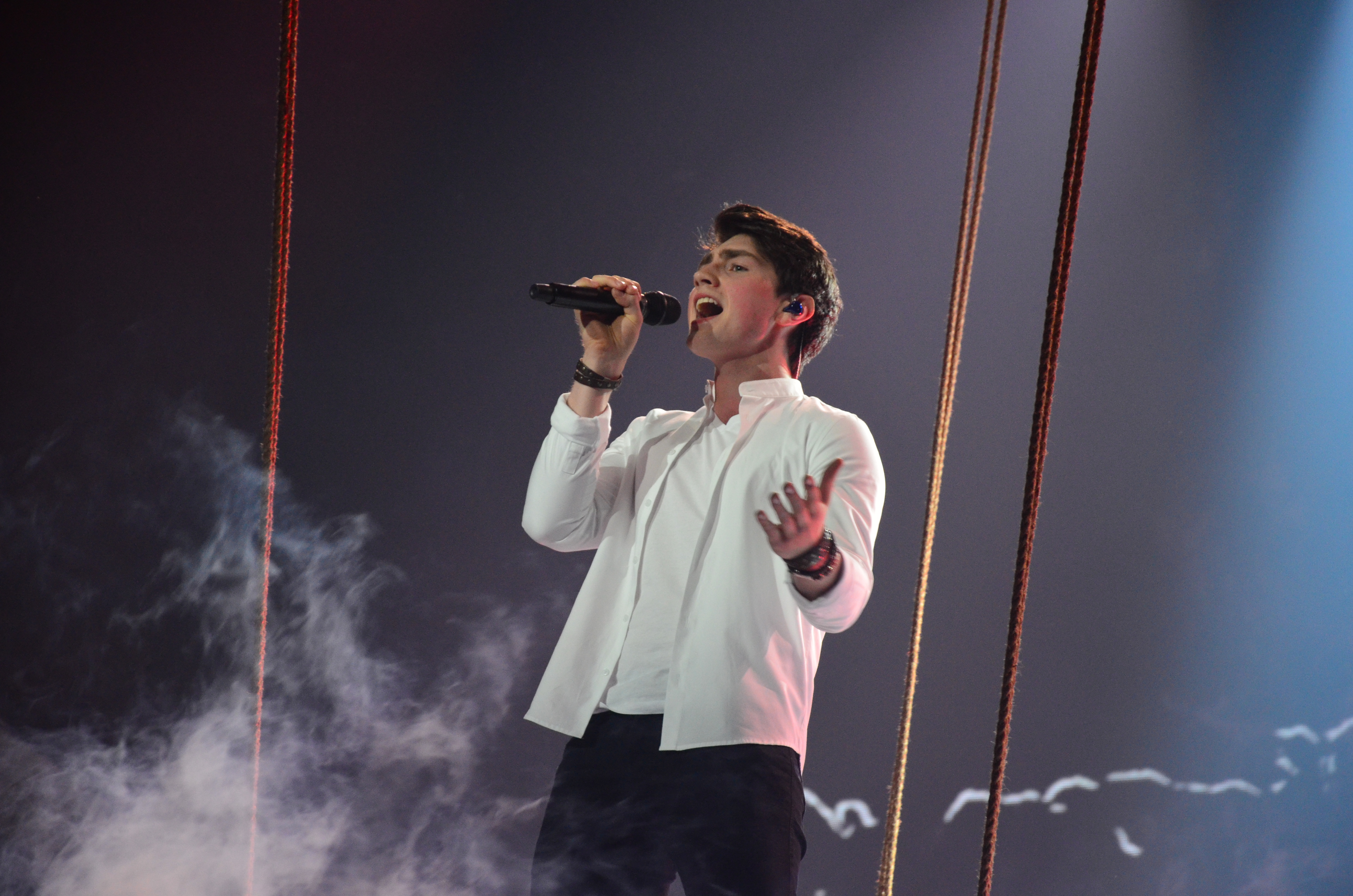
Brendan Murray during a rehearsal before the second semi-final

Brendan Murray took part in technical rehearsals on 2 and 6 May, followed by dress rehearsals on 10 and 11 May. This included the jury show on 10 May where the professional juries of each country watched and voted on the competing entries.

The Irish performance featured Brendan Murray performing on a platform with a hot air balloon above. The LED screens displayed a black and white mountainous landscape with red lights appearing from the second verse onwards and the LED floor displayed water graphics. The creative director who produced Ireland's performance was Nicoline Refsing. Murray was joined by five off-stage backing vocalists: Alison Vard Miller, Graham Kelly, Jules Edwards, Margot Daly and Shane McDaid.

At the end of the show, Ireland was not announced among the top 10 entries in the second semi-final and therefore failed to qualify to compete in the final. It was later revealed that Ireland placed thirteenth in the semi-final, receiving a total of 86 points: 41 points from the televoting and 45 points from the juries.

=== Voting ===
Voting during the three shows involved each country awarding two sets of points from 1-8, 10 and 12: one from their professional jury and the other from televoting. Each nation's jury consisted of five music industry professionals who are citizens of the country they represent, with their names published before the contest to ensure transparency. This jury judged each entry based on: vocal capacity; the stage performance; the song's composition and originality; and the overall impression by the act. In addition, no member of a national jury was permitted to be related in any way to any of the competing acts in such a way that they cannot vote impartially and independently. The individual rankings of each jury member as well as the nation's televoting results were released shortly after the grand final.

Below is a breakdown of points awarded to Ireland and awarded by Ireland in the second semi-final and grand final of the contest, and the breakdown of the jury voting and televoting conducted during the two shows:

==== Points awarded to Ireland ====
Points awarded to Ireland (Semi-final 2)
Score	Televote	Jury
12 points		
10 points		Austria
8 points		Lithuania
7 points	Estonia	Estonia
6 points	Romania	
5 points	Denmark	Hungary
4 points	Lithuania; Malta	Germany
3 points	Austria; Belarus	Romania
2 points	Netherlands; Norway; San Marino	Denmark; Switzerland; Ukraine
1 point	France; Israel; Macedonia	Bulgaria; Malta

==== Points awarded by Ireland ====
Points awarded by Ireland (Semi-final 2)
Score	Televote	Jury
12 points	Lithuania	Bulgaria
10 points	Bulgaria	Austria
8 points	Romania	Switzerland
7 points	Croatia	Norway
6 points	Hungary	Israel
5 points	Netherlands	Malta
4 points	Israel	Romania
3 points	Estonia	Netherlands
2 points	Norway	Serbia
1 point	Belarus	Denmark

Points awarded by Ireland (Final)
Score	Televote	Jury
12 points	Romania	Belgium
10 points	Portugal	Bulgaria
8 points	Moldova	Romania
7 points	Poland	Austria
6 points	Bulgaria	Sweden
5 points	Belgium	Portugal
4 points	United Kingdom	Netherlands
3 points	Croatia	Germany
2 points	Hungary	Norway
1 point	Italy	Azerbaijan

==== Detailed voting results ====
The following members comprised the Irish jury:

- Greg French (jury chairperson) – musical director, producer, composer
- Suzanne Doyle – music industry consultant
- Amanda Lane – singer, band manager, musical director
- Dayl Cronin – singer, musician
- Louise Macnamara – musician, singer, songwriter

Detailed voting results from Ireland (Semi-final 2)
R/O	Country	Jury							Televote	
R/O	Country	G. French	S. Doyle	A. Lane	D. Cronin	L. Macnamara	Rank	Points	Rank	Points
01	Serbia	12	10	11	3	6	9	2	17	
02	Austria	6	5	1	4	9	2	10	11	
03	Macedonia	11	14	16	5	4	12		15	
04	Malta	9	4	3	7	11	6	5	14	
05	Romania	5	9	10	6	5	7	4	3	8
06	Netherlands	10	13	9	1	7	8	3	6	5
07	Hungary	14	16	17	13	3	14		5	6
08	Denmark	8	11	5	8	15	10	1	13	
09	Ireland									
10	San Marino	17	15	15	17	17	17		16	
11	Croatia	3	1	14	16	16	11		4	7
12	Norway	1	2	4	15	10	4	7	9	2
13	Switzerland	4	3	6	2	12	3	8	12	
14	Belarus	13	17	8	14	13	15		10	1
15	Bulgaria	2	7	2	11	1	1	12	2	10
16	Lithuania	15	12	12	12	14	16		1	12
17	Estonia	16	6	13	10	8	13		8	3
18	Israel	7	8	7	9	2	5	6	7	4

Detailed voting results from Ireland (Final)
R/O	Country	Jury							Televote	
R/O	Country	G. French	S. Doyle	A. Lane	D. Cronin	L. Macnamara	Rank	Points	Rank	Points
01	Israel	22	18	13	16	2	15		18	
02	Poland	20	23	14	10	26	21		4	7
03	Belarus	21	15	19	20	18	20		17	
04	Austria	8	2	4	5	12	4	7	16	
05	Armenia	19	11	25	26	17	22		25	
06	Netherlands	14	8	9	2	13	7	4	12	
07	Moldova	15	20	15	7	5	13		3	8
08	Hungary	16	25	24	25	9	23		9	2
09	Italy	10	24	8	4	11	11		10	1
10	Denmark	11	5	11	9	24	12		21	
11	Portugal	1	22	1	11	7	6	5	2	10
12	Azerbaijan	4	10	17	14	10	10	1	23	
13	Croatia	7	3	20	24	16	14		8	3
14	Australia	23	21	7	19	6	17		15	
15	Greece	24	19	22	18	22	25		24	
16	Spain	25	26	26	23	23	26		26	
17	Norway	2	4	16	13	19	9	2	13	
18	United Kingdom	18	13	12	12	20	16		7	4
19	Cyprus	9	17	23	21	21	19		19	
20	Romania	5	9	6	6	3	3	8	1	12
21	Germany	6	6	10	15	15	8	3	22	
22	Ukraine	17	16	18	22	14	18		20	
23	Belgium	13	1	2	1	4	1	12	6	5
24	Sweden	12	12	5	3	8	5	6	11	
25	Bulgaria	3	7	3	8	1	2	10	5	6
26	France	26	14	21	17	25	24		14	
