= Ireland in the Eurovision Song Contest 2001 =

- Eurovision Song Contest 2001
- Participating broadcaster: Radio Telefís Éireann (RTÉ)
- Country: Ireland
- Selection process: Eurosong 2001
- Selection date: 25 February 2001

Competing entry
- Song: "Without Your Love"
- Artist: Gary O'Shaughnessy
- Songwriter: Pat Sheridan

Placement
- Final result: 21st, 6 points

Participation chronology

Ireland was represented at the Eurovision Song Contest 2001 with the song "Without Your Love", written by Pat Sheridan, and performed by Gary O'Shaughnessy. The Irish participating broadcaster, Radio Telefís Éireann (RTÉ), organised the national final Eurosong 2001 in order to select its entry for the contest. Seven songs faced a regional televote, ultimately resulting in the selection of "Without Your Love" performed by Gary O'Shaughnessy as the Irish Eurovision entry.

Ireland competed in the Eurovision Song Contest which took place on 12 May 2001. Performing during the show in position 12, Ireland placed twenty-first out of the 23 participating countries, scoring 6 points.

== Background ==
Prior to the 2001 contest, Radio Éireann (RÉ) until 1966, and Radio Telefís Éireann (RTÉ) since 1967, had participated in the Eurovision Song Contest representing Ireland thirty-five times since RÉ's first entry in 1965. They has won the contest a record seven times in total. Their first win came in 1970, with "All Kinds of Everything" performed by Dana. Ireland holds the record for being the only country to win the contest three times in a row (in 1992, 1993, and 1994), as well as having the only three-time winner (Johnny Logan, who won in 1980 as a singer, 1987 as a singer-songwriter, and again in 1992 as a songwriter). In 2000, "Millennium of Love" performed by Eamonn Toal placed sixth.

As part of its duties as participating broadcaster, RTÉ organises the selection of its entry in the Eurovision Song Contest and broadcasts the event in the country. The broadcaster has consistently used a national final procedure to choose its entry at the contest, with several artists and songs being featured. For the 2001 contest, RTÉ announced the organisation of Eurosong 2001 to choose the artist and song.

== Before Eurovision ==
=== Eurosong 2001 ===
Eurosong 2001 was the national final format developed by RTÉ in order to select its entry for the Eurovision Song Contest 2001. The broadcaster opened a submission period where artists and composers were able to submit their entries for the competition until 29 October 2000, and a jury panel selected the eight finalists after reviewing all of the submissions received at the closing of the deadline. The finalists were announced on 6 February 2001 during a press conference which took place at the Club Annabel in Dublin and was hosted by former contest winner Dana. On 16 February 2001, "Gypsy Blue", written and to have been performed by Thom Moore, was disqualified from the national final as the song had been performed in 2000 at the Dun Laoghaire Song Contest, thus violating the rule that barred songs from being released before the competition.

The national final took place on 25 February 2001 at the RTÉ Television Centre in Dublin, hosted by Louise Loughman and was broadcast on RTÉ One as well as online via RTÉ's official website rte.ie. The show was also broadcast in the United Kingdom on Tara Television. Following a regional televote, "Without Your Love" performed by Gary O'Shaughnessy was selected as the winner. Over 60,000 televotes were cast during the show, with runner-up InFocus receiving the most overall votes with 13,356 votes, followed by third-placed act Fe-Mail with 12,271 votes and O'Shaughnessy with 11,653 votes.

Final – 25 February 2001
R/O	Artist	Song	Songwriter(s)	Points	Place
1	James Peake	"Who Said I Pray"	Colin Maguire	41	5
2	InFocus	"Every Kiss Is a Lie"	Kevin Breathnach, Billy Larkin	70	2
3	Gavin McCormack	"I'll Be with You"	Tommy Quinn	34	6
4	David Murphy	"Katie Lovely"	David Murphy	31	7
5	Fe-Mail	"Undertow"	Paul Swan	63	3
6	Gary O'Shaughnessy	"Without Your Love"	Pat Sheridan	74	1
7	Emma Reynolds	"The Innocent Days"	Gerry Morgan	51	4

Detailed Regional Televoting Results
R/O	Song	Dialling codes							Total
R/O	Song	05	02	06	09	07	04	01	Total
R/O	Song	Waterford	Cork	Limerick	Galway	Sligo	Dundalk	Dublin	Total
1	"Who Said I Pray"	6	5	6	6	6	6	6	41
2	"Every Kiss Is a Lie"	8	10	8	10	12	10	12	70
3	"I'll Be with You"	5	4	5	5	5	5	5	34
4	"Katie Lovely"	4	7	4	4	4	4	4	31
5	"Undertow"	10	8	10	8	7	12	8	63
6	"Without Your Love"	12	12	12	12	8	8	10	74
7	"The Innocent Days"	7	6	7	7	10	7	7	51

== At Eurovision ==
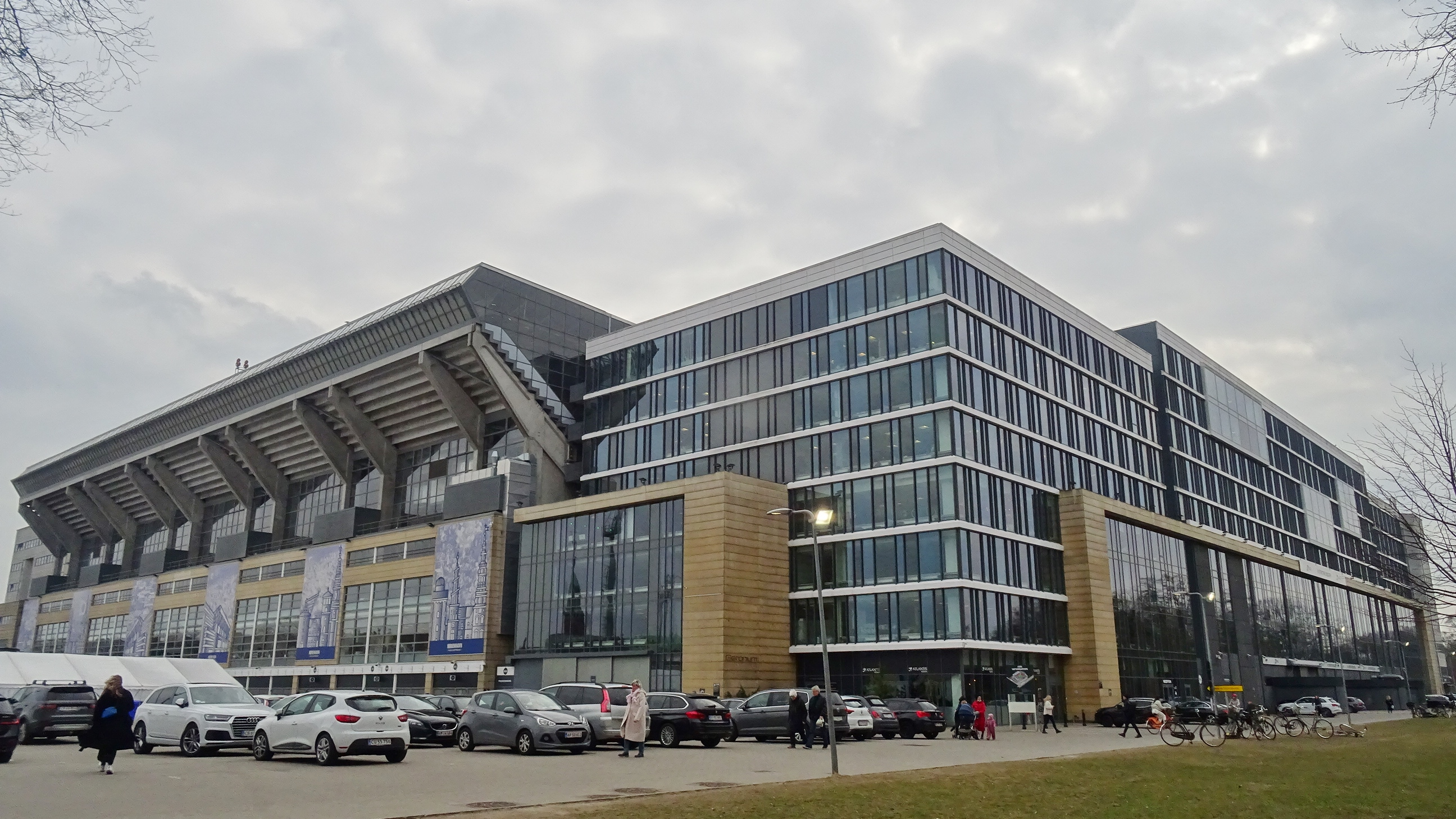
The Eurovision Song Contest 2001 took place at Parken Stadium in Copenhagen, Denmark.

The Eurovision Song Contest 2001 took place at Parken Stadium in Copenhagen, Denmark, on 12 May 2001. The relegation rules introduced for the 1997 contest were again utilised ahead of the 2001 contest, based on each country's average points total in previous contests. The 23 participants were made up of the host country, the "Big Four" countries (France, Germany, Spain, and the United Kingdom), and the 12 countries with the highest average scores between the 1996 and 2000 contests competed in the final. On 21 November 2000, an allocation draw was held which determined the running order and Ireland was set to perform in position 12, following the entry from Portugal and before the entry from Spain. Ireland finished in twenty-first place scoring 6 points.

In Ireland, the contest was broadcast on RTÉ One with commentary by Marty Whelan.

=== Voting ===
Below is a breakdown of points awarded to Ireland and awarded by Ireland in the contest. The nation awarded its 12 points to Denmark in the contest.

RTÉ appointed Bláthnaid Ní Chofaigh as its spokesperson to announced the results of the Irish televote during the show.

Points awarded to Ireland
Score	Country
12 points	
10 points	
8 points	
7 points	
6 points	
5 points	United Kingdom
4 points	
3 points	
2 points	
1 point	Portugal

Points awarded by Ireland
Score	Country
12 points	Denmark
10 points	Estonia
8 points	Sweden
7 points	France
6 points	Germany
5 points	Greece
4 points	United Kingdom
3 points	Spain
2 points	Slovenia
1 point	Lithuania
