= 22 (Sarah McTernan song) =

2019 song by Sarah McTernan

Single by Sarah McTernan
- Released: 29 March 2019
- Length: 2:53
- Label: Universal Music
- Songwriter(s): Janieck van de Polder; Marcia Sondeijker; Roel Rats

Sarah McTernan singles chronology
| "Eye of the Storm" (2016) | "22" (2019) | "Loving You" (2021) |

Music video
- "22" on YouTube

Eurovision Song Contest 2019 entry
- Country: Ireland
- Artist(s): Sarah McTernan
- Language: English
- Composer(s): Janieck van de Polder; Marcia "Misha" Sondeijker; Roel Rats
- Lyricist(s): Janieck van de Polder; Marcia "Misha" Sondeijker; Roel Rats

Finals performance
- Semi-final result: 18th
- Semi-final points: 16

Entry chronology
- ◄ "Together" (2018)
- "Story of My Life" (2020) ►

"22" is a 2019 single by Irish singer Sarah McTernan. The song represented Ireland at the Eurovision Song Contest 2019 in Tel Aviv, Israel, after being internally selected by RTÉ, the Irish public broadcaster for the Eurovision Song Contest. The song would manage an 18th place finish in the second semi-final, not qualifying for the Grand Final.

== Background ==
"22", according to McTernan, is about a woman struggling to move on from her ex. The number 22 talks about her ex's house number, as the singer speaks about "driving by" their house and wanting to get back with her ex, as she feels empty inside. While some have thought that the song was about a crazed stalker, McTernan claims that the song is about her first love.

In an interview, RTÉ Head of Delegation Michael Kealy admitted that "22" was instead meant for a male singer, but once hearing McTernan sing the song in a demo, Kealy decided to let McTernan sing the song.

== Eurovision Song Contest ==
=== Selection ===
On 4 October 2018, Raidió Teilifís Éireann (RTÉ) opened a submission period where artists and composers "with a proven track record of success in the music industry" were able to submit their entries until 23 November 2018. In addition to the public submissions, RTÉ reserved the right to approach established artists and composers to submit entries and to match songs with different artists to the ones who submitted an entry. At the closing of the deadline, 440 entries were received and 70 entries were shortlisted in January 2019.

On 8 March 2019, RTÉ announced that they had internally selected Sarah McTernan to represent Ireland at the Eurovision Song Contest 2019 in Tel Aviv. "22" was eventually released to streaming platforms on 29 March.

=== At Eurovision ===
On 28 January 2019, a special allocation draw was held which placed each country into one of the two semi-finals, as well as which half of the show they would perform in. Ireland was placed into the second semi-final, to be held on 16 May 2019, and was scheduled to perform in the first half of the show. Once all the competing songs for the 2019 contest had been released, the running order for the semi-finals was decided by the shows' producers rather than through another draw, so that similar songs were not placed next to each other. Ireland performed in position 2. The song failed to qualify for the final and finished last overall.

== Track listing ==
Digital download
| No. | Title | Length |
|---|---|---|
| 1. | "22" | 2:53 |
