= Together (Ryan O'Shaughnessy song) =

Ryan O'Shaugnessy song

Single by Ryan O'Shaughnessy
- Released: 9 March 2018
- Genre: Pop
- Length: 2:55
- Label: The Nucleus
- Songwriter(s): Ryan O'Shaughnessy; Mark Caplice; Laura Elizabeth Hughes
- Producer(s): Mark McCabe

Ryan O'Shaughnessy singles chronology
"Got This Feeling" (2017)	"Together" (2018)	"Civil War" (2018)

Music video
- "Together" on YouTube

Eurovision Song Contest 2018 entry
- Country: Ireland
- Artist(s): Ryan O'Shaughnessy
- Language: English
- Composer(s): Ryan O'Shaughnessy; Mark Caplice; Laura Elizabeth Hughes
- Lyricist(s): Ryan O'Shaughnessy; Mark Caplice; Laura Elizabeth Hughes

Finals performance
- Semi-final result: 6th
- Semi-final points: 179
- Final result: 16th
- Final points: 136

Entry chronology
- ◄ "Dying to Try" (2017)
- "22" (2019) ►

"Together" is a song by Irish singer Ryan O'Shaughnessy. The song represented Ireland in the Eurovision Song Contest 2018. The song title was revealed to the public on 31 January 2018, and was composed by O'Shaughnessy as part of a team of The Nucleus writers and produced by Mark McCabe.

== Music video ==
The music video features a same-sex couple, portrayed by professional dancers Alan McGrath and Kevin O'Dwyer, strolling and dancing through the streets of Temple Bar, Dublin. The video was directed by Christian Tierney and was choreographed by Ciaran Connolly. Commenting on the music video, O'Shaughnessy stated, "It was amazing seeing the video come to life in the way it did, sticking with the original concept that love is universal and there are testing moments in every relationship."

While incorporating dancers was O'Shaughnessy's idea for the music video, featuring a gay couple was not initially part of the concept. When it was time to make the video, McGrath and O'Dwyer were the best dancers in Dublin and O'Shaughnessy said, "why not have the two guys doing the dancing".

== Eurovision Song Contest ==
O'Shaughnessy was announced as the Irish act for the 2018 contest on 31 January 2018, and the song is to be revealed in "coming weeks". Ireland performed in the first semi-final on 8 May 2018. It qualified for the final, marking the country's first qualification since the 2013 Contest. The song ultimately landed 16th place with a total score of 136 points.

Alan McGrath and Kevin O'Dwyer, the dancers featured in the song's music video, reprised their roles during the live performance of "Together" during the contest. Their performance is stated to be the first ever depiction of a same-sex couple during the contest's 63-year history. Though this was not true, the dancers' performance still received messages of support on social media. Speaking to the Independent, McGrath stated, "We've had such touching messages from people around Europe who aren't out, or who are in the closet. It's a great thing because Kevin and I were both at that point in our lives at some stage. It's great to be able to send out such a positive message." O'Dwyer added, "We've had so many messages from people we don't know, and young people saying how much it means to them and how important it is what we're doing."

Ireland's performance was censored during the Chinese broadcast of the contest due to its depiction of a gay couple. This resulted in the immediate termination of the Chinese broadcast rights for the rest of the contest.

Ryan's uncle, Gary O'Shaughnessy represented Ireland in the Eurovision Song Contest 2001 with the song "Without Your Love". The song received six points and placed 21st.

Alan McGrath was also a dancer during Ireland's performance at Eurovision 2013, which was also the last time Ireland entered the finals. This prompted a comment from RTE that McGrath was a "lucky charm".

== Charts ==
Chart (2018)	Peak position
Ireland (IRMA)	17
Scotland (OCC)	59
Sweden Heatseeker (Sverigetopplistan)	8
UK Singles Downloads (OCC)	52
