= Johnny Logan (singer) =

Irish singer-songwriter (born 1954)

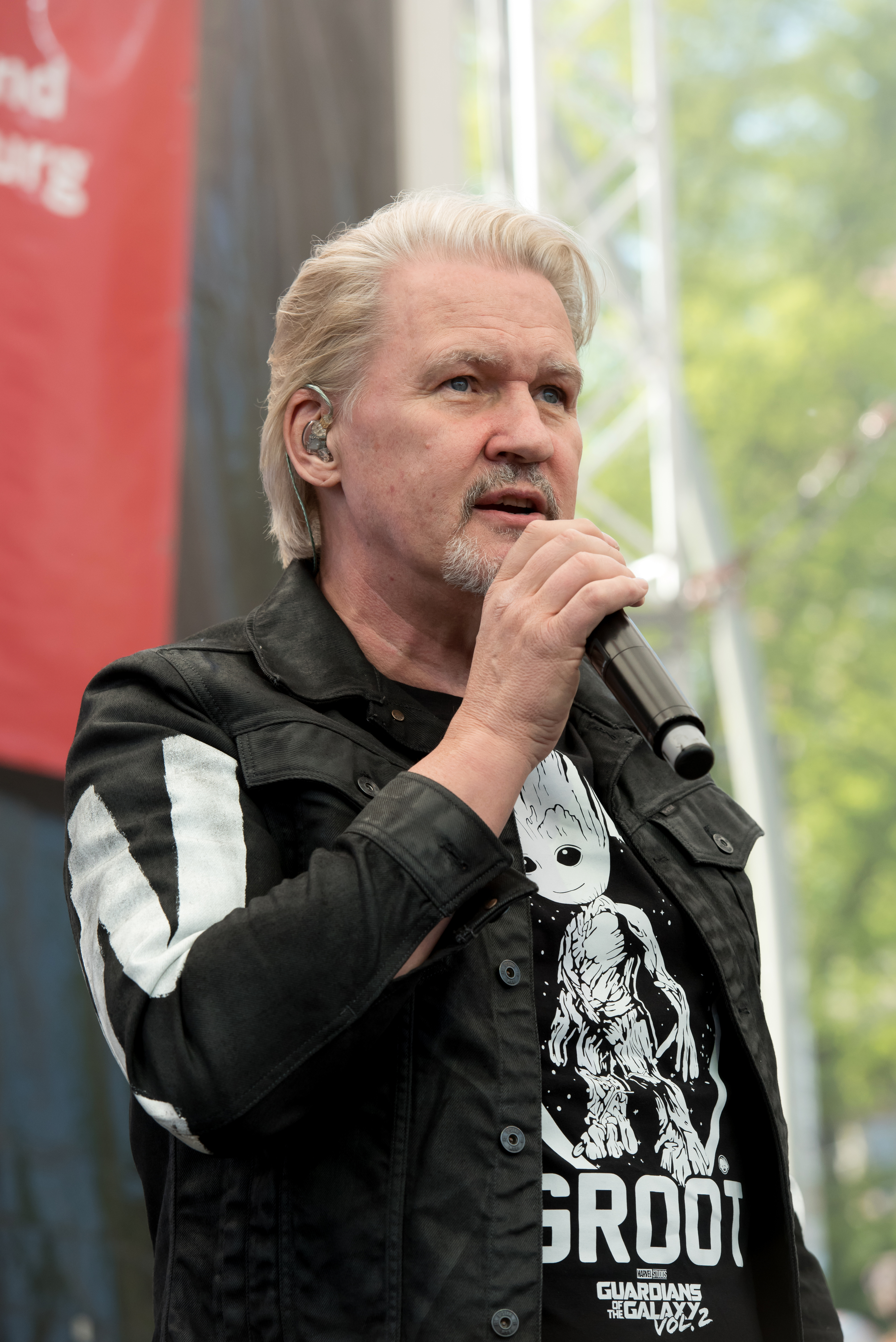
- Logan performing in 2017

Background information
- Born: Seán Patrick Michael Sherrard; 13 May 1954 (age 72); Frankston, Victoria, Australia
- Origin: County Dublin, Ireland
- Genres: Pop; Celtic
- Occupations: Singer; musician
- Instruments: Vocals; guitar
- Years active: 1978–present
- Website: johnnylogan.com

Seán Patrick Michael Sherrard (born 13 May 1954), also known professionally as Johnny Logan, is an Australian-born Irish singer, songwriter and musician. He is known for winning the Eurovision Song Contest twice, in 1980 and 1987. He also composed the winning song in 1992.

Logan won the Eurovision Song Contest in 1980 with the song "What's Another Year", which topped the charts in eight countries. He won for a second time in 1987 with the song "Hold Me Now", which topped the charts in Ireland and Belgium and was a top-ten hit in ten other music markets. For 36 years he was the only artist to have won the contest twice, until Loreen's second victory in 2023.

Logan has also composed two Eurovision songs for Linda Martin, "Terminal 3" in 1984, and "Why Me?" in 1992. The former placed second, while the latter came first, therefore making Logan one of only five people to have composed two winning Eurovision entries.

== Early life ==
Johnny Logan was born Seán Patrick Michael Sherrard on 13 May 1954 in Frankston, Victoria. His father, Charles Alphonsus Sherrard, was a Derry-born Irish tenor better known as Patrick O'Hagan, and happened to be touring Australia at the time of Logan's birth. The family moved back to Ireland when Logan was three years old. He settled in Howth, Co. Dublin and learnt the guitar and began composing his own songs by the age of 13. On leaving school, he apprenticed as an electrician while performing in pubs and cabaret acts. His earliest claim to fame was starring as Adam in the 1977 Irish musical Adam and Eve, and Joseph in Joseph and the Amazing Technicolor Dreamcoat.

== Career ==
=== 1978–1986: First Eurovision win ===
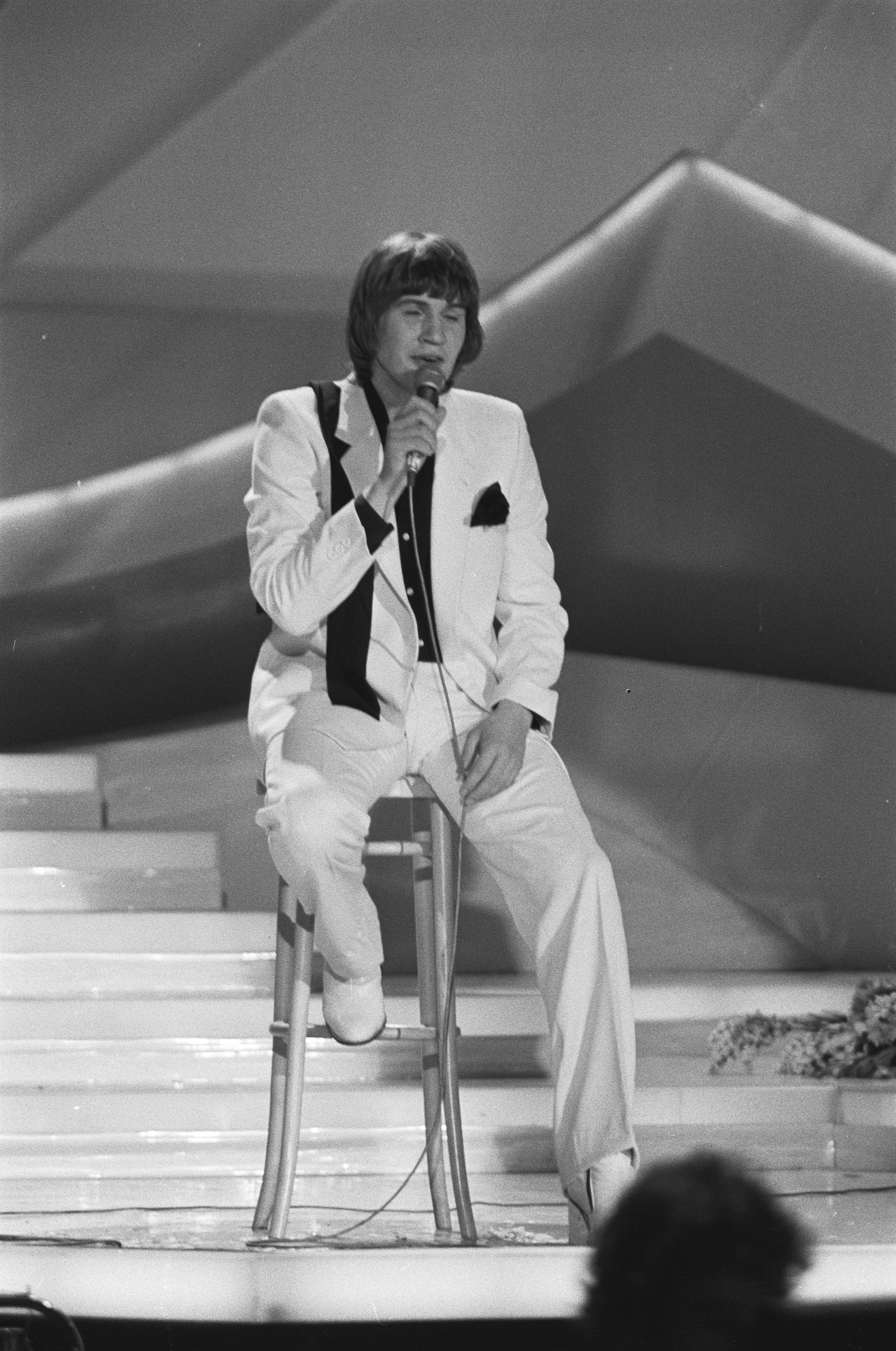
Johnny Logan at the Eurovision Song Contest 1980

Logan adopted the stage name Johnny Logan after the main character of the film Johnny Guitar and released his first single in 1978. He first attempted to participate in the Eurovision Song Contest in 1979, when he placed third in the Irish National Final with the song "Angelina". Readers of The Connaught Telegraph in Ireland voted Logan as Best New Male Artist.

In 1980, Logan again entered the Irish National selection for the Eurovision Song Contest with the Shay Healy song "What's Another Year", winning the Irish final on 9 March in Dublin. Representing Ireland in the Netherlands, Logan won the Eurovision Song Contest 1980 on 19 April. The song became a hit all over Europe and reached number one in the UK.

"In London" was released in June and "Save Me" shortly after. With confusion by radio stations over which to play, both singles flopped. Another single released in late 1980, a cover of a recent Cliff Richard song, "Give A Little Bit More" was a more concerted effort and although it narrowly missed the chart. Logan blames his lack of success in the UK on poor management and his inexperience.

In early 1983, Logan attempted a comeback in the UK with the song "Becoming Electric" with a new sound and image and promotional push, but the song failed to chart. In 1985, Logan released his third studio album Straight From The Heart, which failed to chart. He also collaborated on the chart-topping charity single "You'll Never Walk Alone" in aid of the Bradford City Disaster Fund. In 1986, Logan rebranded himself as Logan with the song "Stab in the Back", which also failed to chart.

=== 1987–1991: Second Eurovision win ===
In 1987, Logan made another attempt at Eurovision and with his self-penned song, "Hold Me Now", he represented Ireland at the Eurovision Song Contest 1987. The song won the contest and Logan became the first person to win the contest twice. "Hold Me Now" became a major European hit and reached number two in the UK. Logan released a cover of the 10cc song "I'm Not in Love", produced by Paul Hardcastle as a follow-up, and an album Hold Me Now. In 1988, Logan released "Heartland" which became a hit in the Irish charts and from then on, concentrated on his career in Ireland and Europe.

In 1990, Logan recorded a country version of "Miss You Nights" with Elvis Presley's backing band The Jordanaires. He also wrote and sang the theme song Angels Don't Hide for the German television show Blue Blood.

=== 1992–2000: Third Eurovision win ===
Having composed the Irish Eurovision Song Contest 1984 entry for Linda Martin, "Terminal 3" (which finished in second place), Logan repeated the collaboration in 1992 when he gave Martin another of his songs, "Why Me". The song became the Irish entry at the finals in Sweden. The song took the title and cemented Logan as the most successful artist in Eurovision history with three wins.

Author and historian John Kennedy O'Connor notes in his book The Eurovision Song Contest – The Official History that Logan is the only lead singer to have sung two winning entries and one of only five authors/composers (all men) to have written/composed two winning songs.

On 16 April 1997 Logan left his handprints in concrete on the Walk of Fame in Rotterdam, the largest boulevard of stars in Europe.

=== 2000–present: Recent career ===
Logan continues to perform and write songs. He is sometimes referred to as "Mister Eurovision" by fans of the contest and the media at large. He has continued his love of participating in musical theatre, having toured Norway with Which Witch, an opera-musical originating in that country.

In October 2005, "Hold Me Now" was voted as the third most popular song in Eurovision history at the 50th anniversary concert in Copenhagen, Denmark. "What's Another Year" was also nominated amongst the 14 finalists. Logan has sold more than 3 million copies worldwide. "Hold Me Now" is also a global million-seller.

Logan has continued to have success, particularly in the Scandinavian countries. His 2007 album, The Irish Connection went platinum in Denmark, twice platinum in Norway and gold in Sweden.

In 2009 and 2010, he performed in the Celtic rock opera Excalibur, and continued to do so in 2011.

Logan was one of the recording artists that appeared in the Irish TV series The Hit, going against Duke Special. He shortlisted the song "Prayin'" by Alan Earls and Jamie Wilson's "Rain" from the pitching rooms. He chose to release "Prayin'" for the chart battle against Special who chose a song called "1969" by Aaron Hackett. Logan won the chart battle with his song charting at number three in the charts, while Special's charted at number five. Logan returned for the final, where he performed "Prayin" with the RTÉ Concert Orchestra and was runner-up to Finbar Furey.

In 2024, he appeared in Malmö during the first semi-final of the Eurovision Song Contest 2024, covering "Euphoria" by Loreen. He also performed on Willkommen 2025 on ZDF later that year.

== In popular culture ==
In 2002, he took part in the UK television quiz show Never Mind the Buzzcocks as a team panelist in a Eurovision special.

"Hold Me Now" has been adopted by fans of Bohemian F.C. (Bohemians) as their anthem and it is played in Dalymount and sung with gusto at both home and away matches.

In 2007, Logan advertised McDonald's Eurosaver menu in Ireland. In 2007, he sang "A State of Happiness", advertising the Dutch Center Parcs.

In 2011, Logan received some publicity over comments perceived as an attack on Jedward, that year's Irish Eurovision entry. When the identical twins appeared on The Late Late Show, presenter Ryan Tubridy asked them how they felt about Logan calling them "an embarrassment to Ireland". Logan later clarified those comments: "What I said was that I find them embarrassing to watch. It's like watching two Frank Spencers in Some Mothers Do 'Ave 'Em. It's like watching a train crash – you can't look away, but at the same time you don't want to see it". He subsequently refused an interview with RTÉ broadcaster Derek Mooney as, according to Mooney, "he thought we were going to stitch him up". Logan gave an interview to Today FM broadcaster Ray D'Arcy instead.

On 16 December 2012, Logan appeared as musical guest on Romanian edition of X Factor.

In May 2012, Anmary, the Latvian representative to the Eurovision Song Contest 2012 sang "Beautiful Song" where, in the opening lyrics, she sings: "I was born in distant 1980 / The year that Irish Johnny Logan won / Thirty years or more, they still remember / So dream away, today's the day I'm singing my song" referring to Logan's 1980 Eurovision win "What's Another Year".

In 2020, The Sunday Times revealed a movie about the life and career of Logan was in the works called Mr Eurovision.

Logan performed "What's Another Year" during the Eurovision: Europe Shine a Light programme, held on 16 May 2020 as a replacement for the cancelled Eurovision Song Contest 2020. He performed the song with the programme's presenters Chantal Janzen, Edsilia Rombley and Jan Smit, alongside a choir of Eurovision fans.

In June 2021, Logan released a new single "Just one look" with Finnish singer Jannike.

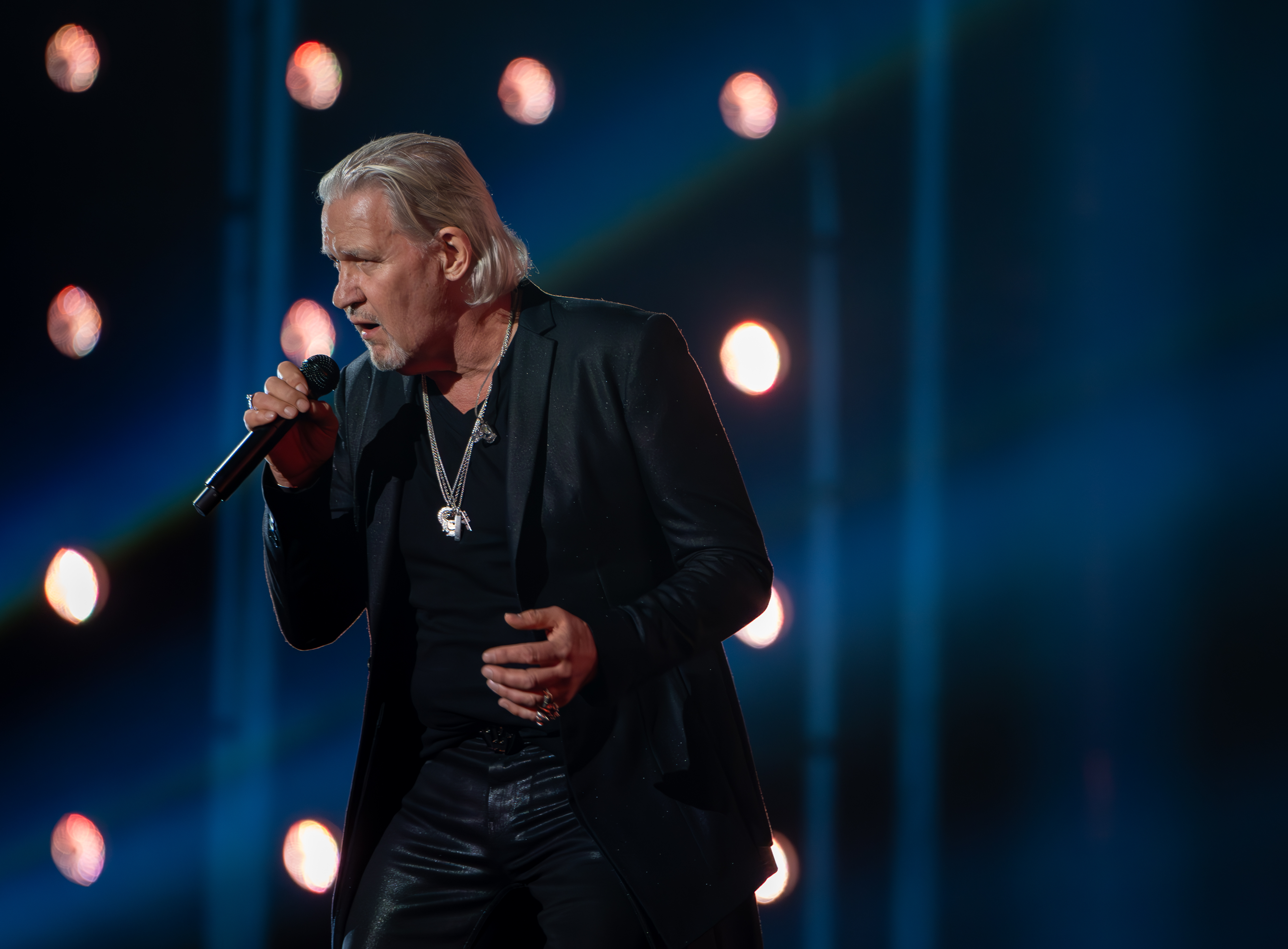
Logan at the Eurovision Song Contest 2024

In 2022, he was a contestant in the second season of The Masked Singer in Belgium, as 'the red deer'.

== Personal life ==
Logan lives in Ireland. He has been married to his wife Ailis Sherrard since 1976 and they have three sons: Adam, Fionn and Jack. He rarely gives media interviews, claiming to have been frequently misquoted.

== Discography ==
Awards and achievements
Preceded by (Israel) Milk and Honey with "Hallelujah"	Winner of the Eurovision Song Contest; 1980	Succeeded by (United Kingdom) Bucks Fizz with "Making Your Mind Up"
Preceded by (Belgium) Sandra Kim with "J'aime la vie"	Winner of the Eurovision Song Contest; 1987	Succeeded by (Switzerland) Céline Dion with "Ne partez pas sans moi"
Preceded by Cathal Dunne with "Happy Man"	Ireland in the Eurovision Song Contest; 1980	Succeeded by Sheeba with "Horoscopes"
Preceded by Luv Bug with "You Can Count on Me"	Ireland in the Eurovision Song Contest; 1987	Succeeded by Jump The Gun with "Take Him Home"
