= Irish Singles Chart =

Music sales chart

The Irish Singles Chart is the Republic of Ireland's music industry standard singles popularity chart issued weekly by the Irish Recorded Music Association (IRMA) and compiled on their behalf by the Official Charts Company. Chart rankings are based on sales, which are compiled through over-the-counter retail data captured electronically each day from retailers' EPOS systems. All major record shops, digital retailers and streaming services contribute to the chart, accounting for over 95% of the market. A new chart is compiled and released to the public by the Irish Recorded Music Association on Friday at noon. Each chart is dated with the "week-ending" date of the previous Thursday (i.e., the day before issue). The singles chart was first published on 1 October 1962, and covered the top ten singles of the previous week by record label shipments.

As of the issue dated 20 November 2026, the current number-one single on the chart is "My Body Isn't Ready" by Sombr.

== History ==
The charts were first broadcast on RTÉ on 1 October 1962. Before this charts had been printed in the Evening Herald newspaper, but it is debated as to whether they are official or not. Up until 1972 the Irish Chart was based on telephone sales received from record retailers based on over-the-counter sales to the public. The compilers of the chart changed several times and in January 1972 the chart changed to one based on sales from manufacturers to retailers. From October 1975 to February 1977 the chart was compiled from votes from readers in the Evening Herald newspaper. There was a separate Irish and International artists chart for a time during this period. From 1977 the chart once again became based on sales from retailers to the public but during the early 1980s this again changed and was once more based on sales from manufacturers to retailers. RTÉ 2fm broadcasts the top 30 of the chart every Friday night from 8pm to 10pm.

In 1992, the singles chart became based on consumer sales after IFPI and the Irish Recorded Music Association (IRMA) granted a contract to Gallup, a market research company. Gallup installed Epson PX-4 devices in sixty record stores to collect singles sales data. In 1996, Chart-Track was formed as a result of a management buy-out from Gallup. Also in 1996, with the development of technology, EPOS systems were installed in multiple music retail stores. The EPOS systems allowed for the collection of more accurate sales information. Chart-Track collects data daily from major record stores such as HMV and Tower Records, as well as over forty Independent retailers. In total, data from over four-hundred and ninety stores are collected each week. The singles chart is compiled over seven days and released every Friday at noon by the IRMA, while Midweek Charts are produced daily, but only released to IRMA members.

It was announced that from 1 July 2006, downloads would be counted in the charts. They would also feature in their own chart in addition to being counted for the overall chart. Data was initially collected from iTunes, Vodafone, eircom, Sony Connect, Wippit and Bleep.com. Although IRMA estimated the size of the download market to amount to only 14% of the total market in 2006, this has increased in more recent years.

In 2014, the Irish charts first included music streaming data and in 2018, music video streaming data was included for the first time.

== Chart achievements ==
All information is from 1962 to the present and does not include charts printed in the Evening Herald newspaper.

=== First Irish artist to debut at number one ===
Dickie Rock & the Miami Showband with "Every Step of the Way" (1965)

=== Artists with the most number one hits ===
Total	Artist
21	U2
13	The Beatles
13	Westlife
12	ABBA
9	Cliff Richard
9	Michael Jackson
9	Boyzone
9	Eminem
9	Ed Sheeran
8	Dickie Rock
8	Elvis Presley
8	Madonna
8	Britney Spears
8	Rihanna
8	Calvin Harris

=== Songs with the most weeks at number one ===
Weeks	Artist(s)	Song	Year(s)
18	Bill Whelan	"Riverdance"	1994
18	Sam Fender and Olivia Dean	"Rein Me In"*	2026
17	Kingfishr	"Killeagh"*	2025–26
15	Luis Fonsi and Daddy Yankee featuring Justin Bieber	"Despacito"	2017
14	Ed Sheeran	"Shape of You"*	2017
14	Noah Kahan	"Stick Season"*	2023–24
13	Republic of Ireland Football Squad	"Put 'Em Under Pressure"	1990
13	Gracie Abrams	"That's So True"*	2024–25
12	The Black Eyed Peas	"I Gotta Feeling"*	2009
12	Pharrell Williams	"Happy"*	2014
11	Bryan Adams	"(Everything I Do) I Do It for You"*	1991
11	Queen	"Bohemian Rhapsody"* (Note: The 1975–76 original release of "Bohemian Rhapsody" b/w "I'm in Love with My Car" spent 6 weeks atop the chart. The 1991–92 re-release of "Bohemian Rhapsody" b/w "These Are the Days of Our Lives" spent 5 weeks atop the chart.)	1975–76
11	Queen	"Bohemian Rhapsody"*	1991–92
11	Drake featuring Wizkid and Kyla	"One Dance"*	2016
11	Ed Sheeran	"Bad Habits"	2021

Note: Songs denoted with an asterisk (*) spent non-consecutive weeks at number one.

=== Songs with the most weeks on chart ===
Weeks	Artist(s)	Song
326	The Killers	"Mr. Brightside"
242	Lewis Capaldi	"Someone You Loved"
235	Fleetwood Mac	"Dreams"
232	Tom Odell	"Another Love"*
218	Hozier	"Take Me To Church"
211	Vance Joy	"Riptide"*
164	Lady Gaga and Bradley Cooper	"Shallow"
162	Goo Goo Dolls	"Iris"*
158	Noah Kahan	"Stick Season"*
152	Coldplay	"Viva La Vida"*

Note: Songs denoted with an asterisk (*) are still increasing tally.

=== Acts to occupy the top two simultaneously ===
- Lady Gaga — "Just Dance" (with Colby O'Donis) and "Poker Face" (two weeks in February 2009).
- Pharrell Williams — "Get Lucky" (with Daft Punk) and "Blurred Lines" (with Robin Thicke & T.I.) (one week in May 2013); "Blurred Lines" (with Robin Thicke & T.I.) and "Get Lucky" (with Daft Punk) (six weeks in May and June 2013).
- Justin Bieber
  - "Sorry" and "Love Yourself" (one week in December 2015); "Love Yourself" and "Sorry" (seven weeks in December 2015 and January 2016).
  - "Cold Water" (with Major Lazer & MØ) and "Let Me Love You" (with DJ Snake) (two weeks in August 2016).
  - "Despacito" (with Luis Fonsi & Daddy Yankee) and "I'm the One" (with DJ Khaled, Quavo, Chance the Rapper & Lil Wayne) (five weeks in May and June 2017).
- Ed Sheeran
  - "Shape of You" and "Castle on the Hill" (seven weeks in January, February and March 2017).
  - "Galway Girl" and "Shape of You" (seven weeks in March and April 2017).
  - "Perfect" and "River" (with Eminem) (four non-consecutive weeks in December 2017 and January 2018).
- Ariana Grande — "Break Up with Your Girlfriend, I'm Bored" and "7 Rings" (one week in February 2019); "7 Rings" and "Break Up with Your Girlfriend, I'm Bored" (one week in February 2019).
- Dermot Kennedy — "Giants" and "Paradise" (with Meduza) (four weeks in December 2020).
- Olivia Rodrigo — "Good 4 U" and "Deja Vu" (three weeks in May and June 2021).
- Taylor Swift
  - "Anti-Hero" and "Lavender Haze" (one week in October 2022).
  - "The Fate of Ophelia" and "Opalite" (one week in October 2025).
- Sabrina Carpenter — "Please Please Please" and "Espresso" (four weeks in June and July 2024); "Taste" and "Please Please Please" (one week in August 2024).
- Zach Bryan — "Nine Ball" and "Revival" (one week in June 2025).

In addition, in the fifth and seventh week that Justin Bieber was at #1 and #2 with "Love Yourself" and "Sorry", "What Do You Mean" was at #3. For the sixth week that Ed Sheeran was at #1 and #2 with "Galway Girl" and "Shape of You", he also occupied #3 to #16 with the remaining tracks from "÷". In the second week, "Castle on the Hill", "Nancy Mulligan" and "New Man" occupied #3, #4 and #5 respectively and "Castle on the Hill" remained at #3 for the third week. For the first two weeks that Olivia Rodrigo occupied the top two spots with "Good 4 U" and "Deja Vu", "Traitor" was also at #3.

=== Artists with the most top fifty hits ===
Total	Artist
84	Drake
77	Taylor Swift
70	Cliff Richard
68	Ed Sheeran
67	Madonna
66	Justin Bieber
62	Elvis Presley
61	Elton John
56	Eminem
55	Rihanna

== See also ==
- Ireland Eurovision Song Contest entries discography
- List of artists who reached number one in Ireland
- List of songs that reached number one on the Irish Singles Chart
- List of Irish Singles Chart Christmas number ones
