= Ireland in the Eurovision Song Contest =

- Eurovision Song Contest
- Participating broadcaster: Raidió Teilifís Éireann (RTÉ) (2010–2025) Formerly: Radio Éireann (RÉ; 1965–1966); Radio Telefís Éireann (RTÉ; 1967–2009)

Participation summary
- Appearances: 58 (46 finals)
- First appearance: 1965
- Last appearance: 2025
- Highest placement: 1st: 1970, 1980, 1987, 1992, 1993, 1994, 1996
- Host: 1971, 1981, 1988, 1993, 1994, 1995, 1997
- Participation history: 1965; 1966; 1967; 1968; 1969; 1970; 1971; 1972; 1973; 1974; 1975; 1976; 1977; 1978; 1979; 1980; 1981; 1982; 1983; 1984; 1985; 1986; 1987; 1988; 1989; 1990; 1991; 1992; 1993; 1994; 1995; 1996; 1997; 1998; 1999; 2000; 2001; 2002; 2003; 2004; 2005; 2006; 2007; 2008; 2009; 2010; 2011; 2012; 2013; 2014; 2015; 2016; 2017; 2018; 2019; ~~2020~~; 2021; 2022; 2023; 2024; 2025; 2026

External links
- RTÉ page
- Ireland's page at Eurovision.com
- For the most recent participation see Ireland in the Eurovision Song Contest 2025

Ireland has been represented at the Eurovision Song Contest 58 times since its debut in 1965, missing three contests. The current Irish participating broadcaster in the contest is Raidió Teilifís Éireann (RTÉ). With a total of seven wins, Ireland held the record for most victories since its sixth win in 1994, and since 2023, it has shared a joint record total of seven wins with Sweden, and is the only country to have won three consecutive times. Ireland also holds the record for most victories in one decade, winning a total of four times in the 1990s.

Ireland's seven wins were achieved by the following songs: "All Kinds of Everything" performed by Dana (1970), "What's Another Year" (1980) and "Hold Me Now" (1987) both by Johnny Logan, "Why Me?" by Linda Martin (1992), "In Your Eyes" by Niamh Kavanagh (1993), "Rock 'n' Roll Kids" by Paul Harrington and Charlie McGettigan (1994), and "The Voice" by Eimear Quinn (1996). Ireland has also finished second four times. RTÉ has hosted the contest on seven occasions; all were held in the Irish capital Dublin except for the 1993 contest, which was staged in Millstreet, a town in north-west County Cork with a population of 1,500 people. All of Ireland's entries have been performed in English with the exception of the 1972 entry, "Ceol an Ghrá", which was sung in Irish.

Since the introduction of the qualifying round in 1994, Ireland has won the contest twice. Since the introduction of semi-finals in 2004, Ireland has failed to reach the final 12 times, and has twice finished last in the final, in 2007 and 2013. Ireland's only top 10 results between 2007 and 2024 were an eighth-place finish with "Lipstick" by Jedward in 2011, and a sixth-place finish with "Doomsday Blue" by Bambie Thug in 2024.

== Broadcaster ==
Radio Éireann (RÉ) in 1965 and 1966, Radio Telefís Éireann (RTÉ) between 1967 and 2009, and Raidió Teilifís Éireann (RTÉ) since 2010, have been consecutively full members of the European Broadcasting Union (EBU), thus eligible to participate in the Eurovision Song Contest. They have participated representing Ireland since RTÉ's first entry in the tenth edition of the contest in 1965. RTÉ broadcasts the semi-finals on RTÉ2, and the final on RTÉ One.

== History ==
In the years when the live orchestra was present in the contest, almost all of Ireland's Eurovision entries were conducted by Noel Kelehan. The exceptions were 1965 (Italian host conductor Gianni Ferrio), 1970 (Dutch host conductor Dolf van der Linden), from 1972 to 1975 (Colman Pearce), 1979 (Proinnsias Ó Duinn), 1994 (no conductor, although Kelehan conducted three other entries from Romania, Greece and Poland) and in 1997 (Frank McNamara was the musical director for the contest staged in Dublin, but the Irish entry was played with a backing track with no orchestra).

=== Early years ===
RTÉ first participated in 1965, with Butch Moore being Ireland's first artist to perform at the contest, he was followed in 1966 by Dickie Rock. Seán Dunphy finished second at the 1967 contest, behind Sandie Shaw, followed by Pat McGeegan finishing fourth in 1968, Muriel Day in 1965 was the first female to represent the country.

Dana gave Ireland its first victory in 1970 with "All Kinds of Everything", Ireland hosted for the first time in 1971 in which a new voting system was introduced for the next three contests. All of Ireland's entries have been performed in English with the exception of the 1972 entry, "Ceol an Ghrá", which was sung in Irish by Sandie Jones, in this year, Ireland received a lower score than usual.

Johnny Logan brought Ireland its second victory in 1980 with "What's Another Year?". In 1987, Logan returned to the contest as a performer, and became the first entrant to win the contest twice, achieving his second victory with the self-penned "Hold Me Now".

Ireland hosted the contest twice at the Royal Dublin Society in 1981 and 1988, the latter contest saw a victory for Switzerland who were represented by a then unknown Celine Dion.

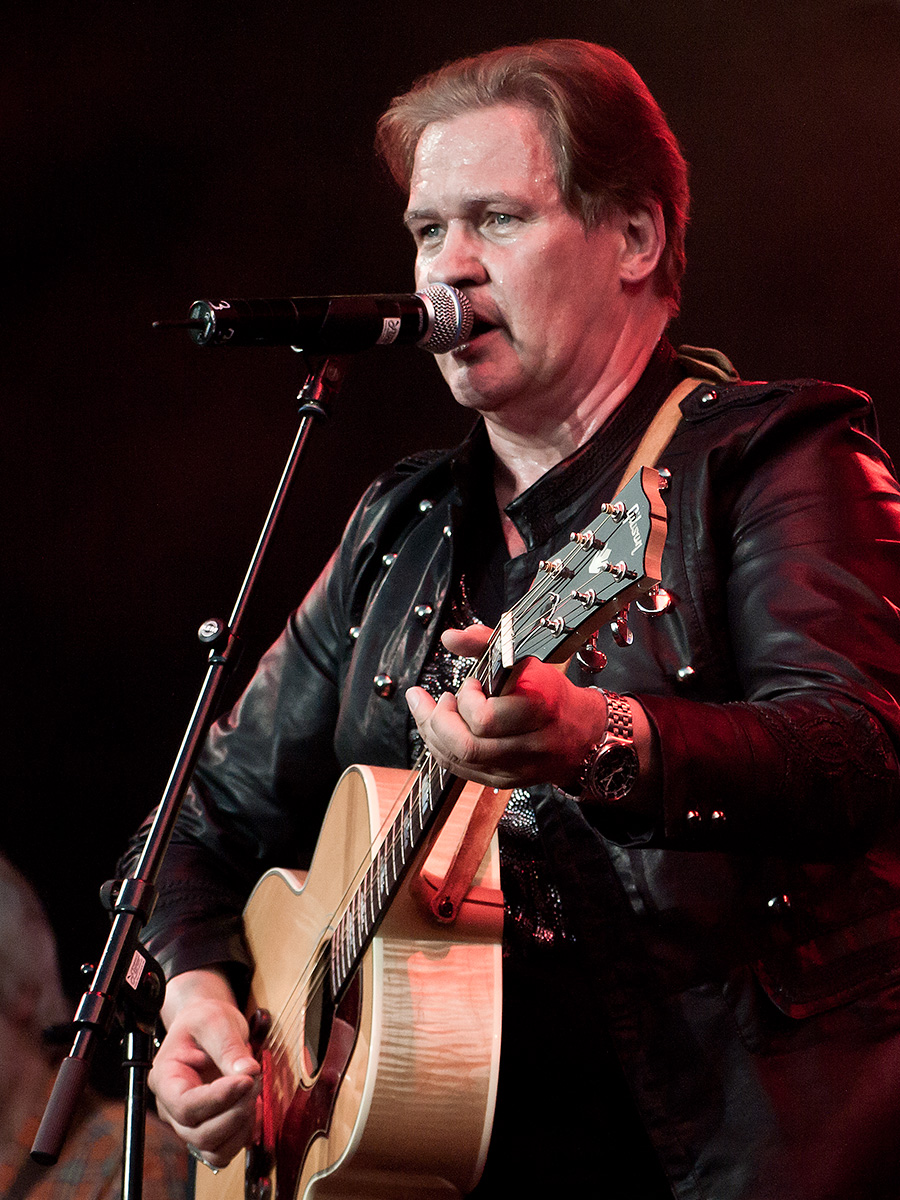
Johnny Logan won Eurovision for Ireland as a solo singer on two occasions – in 1980, as singer and songwriter in 1987 – and he composed the winning entry for Linda Martin in 1992.

=== 1990s winning streak and record breaking success ===
Ireland's most successful decade to date is the 1990s, beginning with Liam Reilly finishing joint second in 1990. Ireland subsequently achieved an unequalled three consecutive victories in the contest: in 1992, the 1984 runner-up Linda Martin returned to win with "Why Me?" – penned once again by Johnny Logan, giving him a total of three victories as either a performer or writer; in 1993, Niamh Kavanagh was victorious over the United Kingdom's Sonia with "In Your Eyes"; and in 1994, Paul Harrington and Charlie McGettigan won with Brendan Graham's "Rock 'n' Roll Kids".

In 1993, Ireland received their fifth win, now equalling France and Luxembourg, as well as being the fourth country to win two times consecutively, the others being Spain, Israel and Luxembourg. In 1994, Ireland made history as the first country to win three times consecutively, a record they still hold as of 2026, as well as becoming the first country to win the contest six times. Ireland hosted the event on three consecutive occasions: in 1993 in Millstreet, and in 1994 and 1995 at the Point Theatre in Dublin.

The winning streak was broken in 1995 when Hiberno-Nordic group Secret Garden, representing Norway, won with the almost entirely instrumental "Nocturne". The group contained an Irish member, Naas-born Fionnuala Sherry.

The decade would see yet another victory for Ireland in 1996 when Eimear Quinn won with another successful Brendan Graham composition, "The Voice"; This made Ireland the only country to win the contest four times in one decade, and extended Ireland's record total to seven wins. Marc Roberts would also finish second for Ireland in 1997, which was hosted once again at the Point in Dublin. It has been rumoured since the victorious decade that RTE have tried to sabotage Ireland from winning further contests, to avoid the high cost of hosting duties, although this has never been proved.

=== 21st century ===
In the 21st century, Ireland has fared less well, achieving considerably poorer results in comparison to the 1990s. The country's only top 10 placement of the 2000s came when Brian Kennedy finished tenth in 2006. At the 2007 contest, Ireland's representatives were Irish folk group Dervish performing "They Can't Stop The Spring"; having automatically qualified for the final, the group finished last with five points (all from Albania, whose jury votes prevented Ireland from achieving its first no-point score), becoming the first Irish entrants to come last in a final. In 2008, Dustin the Turkey failed to qualify for the final with his song "Irelande Douze Pointe"; the same fate befell Sinéad Mulvey and Black Daisy in 2009.

In 2011, Ireland's luck changed when X Factor finalists Jedward finished in eighth place with 119 points, thus making them Ireland's most successful entry in 11 years. Their song "Lipstick" topped the iTunes charts in Austria, Germany, Ireland and Sweden. Jedward represented Ireland again in 2012 with "Waterline", but after making it through to the final, they were awarded only 46 points, finishing in 19th place. In 2013, Ireland came last in the final for the second time.

In 2018, Ireland qualified for the final for the first time since 2013 with Ryan O'Shaughnessy and "Together", but four more non-qualifications followed in 2019, 2021, 2022 and 2023. The country returned to the final in 2024 with Bambie Thug and "Doomsday Blue", and finished in sixth place with 278 points, achieving Ireland's best result since 2000 and breaking Paul Harrington and Charlie McGettigan's record for the most points achieved by an Irish entry in the final.

Ireland failed to qualify from the semi-final in 2025, and on 4 December of that year, RTÉ announced it would not participate in 2026 due to the inclusion of Israel in the context of the Gaza war. The broadcaster opted against a return to the 2027 contest, citing continued dissatisfaction with Israeli inclusion.

== Absences ==
Ireland has been absent from the contest three times. A strike at RTÉ in 1983 meant that the broadcaster did not have the resources to send an entry to Munich, though it still broadcast the contest via the BBC's commentary feed. Ireland was relegated in 2002, though RTÉ broadcast the event and a television commentator was sent to Tallinn. RTÉ opted not to compete in the 2026 contest in Vienna due to the participation of Israel amidst the Gaza war, and for the first time since its debut, RTÉ also did not broadcast the event. The broadcaster is maintaining its boycott and skipping the 2027 contest in Burgas.

== Further involvement ==
Logan went on to write the 1984 entry "Terminal 3", performed by Linda Martin, which finished second. Logan also wrote the 1992 winning entry. Ireland, who also finished second with "If I Could Choose" by Sean Dunphy (1967), "Terminal 3" by Linda Martin (1984), "Somewhere in Europe" by Liam Reilly (1990), and "Mysterious Woman" by Marc Roberts (1997), has a total of 18 top five results.

Seven singers have represented Ireland more than once at the contest: Johnny Logan (1980, 1987), Linda Martin (1984, 1992), Niamh Kavanagh (1993, 2010), Tommy and Jimmy Swarbrigg (as "The Swarbriggs" in 1975 and part of "The Swarbriggs Plus Two" in 1977), Maxi (as a soloist in 1973 and as part of Sheeba in 1981) and Jedward in 2011 and 2012.

Eight people have written and composed more than one Irish entry: Brendan Graham (1976, 1985, 1994, 1996), Johnny Logan (1984, 1987, 1992), Jonas Gladnikoff (2009, 2010, 2014), Tommy and Jimmy Swarbrigg (1975, 1977), Liam Reilly (1990, 1991), Joe Burkett (composer 1972, lyricist 1981), Niall Mooney (2009, 2010) and Jörgen Elofsson (2017, 2023).

Ronan Keating (who presented the 1997 contest) collaborated on the 2009 entry for Denmark.

RTÉ presenter Marty Whelan was the national commentator between 2000 and 2025.

== Records ==
Ireland holds the record for the most victories (jointly with Sweden): seven wins including three consecutive wins. The country has also achieved second place four times and third once.

Ireland is one of the few countries to have achieved consecutive wins (along with Spain, Luxembourg and Israel) and the only country to win consecutively three times, and the nation won again in 1996, thereby accumulating four victories in five years.

Ireland is the only country to host the contest consecutively and is one of eight countries never to turn down the chance to host the event.

Out of 59 appearances and 46 finals, Ireland has reached the top ten 32 times and the top five 18 times. As of 2024, Ireland has not reached the top five since 1997.

Ireland holds the record for most points from one country in a year (alongside France) in the 'one point per juror' voting system, achieving nine votes out of a possible ten from Belgium (in 1970). France had achieved this same feat in 1958.

Ireland has an average of 74 points per contest, the highest average, two points above the United Kingdom.

During the first semi-final of the 2014 contest, it was revealed that the duo Jedward hold two Eurovision records: the highest hair (18.9 cm) and the biggest shoulder pads.

== Participation overview ==
Table key
1	First place
2	Second place
3	Third place
◁	Last place
◇	Entry selected but did not compete

Year	Artist	Song	Language	Final	Points	Semi	Points
1965	Butch Moore	"I'm Walking the Streets in the Rain"	English	6	11	No semi-finals	
1966	Dickie Rock	"Come Back to Stay"	English	4	14	No semi-finals	
1967	Sean Dunphy	"If I Could Choose"	English	2	22	No semi-finals	
1968	Pat McGeegan	"Chance of a Lifetime"	English	4	18	No semi-finals	
1969	Muriel Day	"The Wages of Love"	English	7	10	No semi-finals	
1970	Dana	"All Kinds of Everything"	English	1	32	No semi-finals	
1971	Angela Farrell	"One Day Love"	English	11	79	No semi-finals	
1972	Sandie Jones	"Ceol an Ghrá"	Irish	15	72	No semi-finals	
1973	Maxi	"Do I Dream?"	English	10	80	No semi-finals	
1974	Tina Reynolds	"Cross Your Heart"	English	7	11	No semi-finals	
1975	The Swarbriggs	"That's What Friends Are For"	English	9	68	No semi-finals	
1976	Red Hurley	"When?"	English	10	54	No semi-finals	
1977	The Swarbriggs Plus Two	"It's Nice to Be in Love Again"	English	3	119	No semi-finals	
1978	Colm C. T. Wilkinson	"Born to Sing"	English	5	86	No semi-finals	
1979	Cathal Dunne	"Happy Man"	English	5	80	No semi-finals	
1980	Johnny Logan	"What's Another Year?"	English	1	143	No semi-finals	
1981	Sheeba	"Horoscopes"	English	5	105	No semi-finals	
1982	The Duskeys	"Here Today, Gone Tomorrow"	English	11	49	No semi-finals	
1984	Linda Martin	"Terminal 3"	English	2	137	No semi-finals	
1985	Maria Christian	"Wait Until the Weekend Comes"	English	6	91	No semi-finals	
1986	Luv Bug	"You Can Count On Me"	English	4	96	No semi-finals	
1987	Johnny Logan	"Hold Me Now"	English	1	172	No semi-finals	
1988	Jump the Gun	"Take Him Home"	English	8	79	No semi-finals	
1989	Kiev Connolly and the Missing Passengers	"The Real Me"	English	18	21	No semi-finals	
1990	Liam Reilly	"Somewhere in Europe"	English	2	132	No semi-finals	
1991	Kim Jackson	"Could It Be That I'm in Love?"	English	10	47	No semi-finals	
1992	Linda Martin	"Why Me?"	English	1	155	No semi-finals	
1993	Niamh Kavanagh	"In Your Eyes"	English	1	187	Kvalifikacija za Millstreet	
1994	Paul Harrington and Charlie McGettigan	"Rock 'n' Roll Kids"	English	1	226	No semi-finals	
1995	Eddie Friel	"Dreamin'"	English	14	44	No semi-finals	
1996	Eimear Quinn	"The Voice"	English	1	162	2	198
1997	Marc Roberts	"Mysterious Woman"	English	2	157	No semi-finals	
1998	Dawn Martin	"Is Always Over Now?"	English	9	64	No semi-finals	
1999	The Mullans	"When You Need Me"	English	17	18	No semi-finals	
2000	Eamonn Toal	"Millennium of Love"	English	6	92	No semi-finals	
2001	Gary O'Shaughnessy	"Without Your Love"	English	21	6	No semi-finals	
2003	Mickey Harte	"We've Got the World"	English	11	53	No semi-finals	
2004	Chris Doran	"If My World Stopped Turning"	English	22	7	Top 11 in 2003 contest (Note: According to the then-Eurovision rules, the top ten non-Big Four countries from the previous year along with the Big Four automatically qualified for the Grand Final without having to compete in semi-finals. For example, if Germany and France placed inside the top ten, the 11th and 12th spots were advanced to next year's Grand Final along with all countries ranked in the top ten.)	
2005	Donna and Joe	"Love?"	English	Failed to qualify		14	53
2006	Brian Kennedy	"Every Song Is a Cry for Love"	English	10	93	9	79
2007	Dervish	"They Can't Stop the Spring"	English	24 ◁	5	Top 10 in 2006 final	
2008	Dustin the Turkey	"Irelande Douze Pointe"	English	Failed to qualify		15	22
2009	Sinéad Mulvey and Black Daisy	"Et Cetera"	English	Failed to qualify		11	52
2010	Niamh Kavanagh	"It's for You"	English	23	25	9	67
2011	Jedward	"Lipstick"	English	8	119	8	68
2012	Jedward	"Waterline"	English	19	46	6	92
2013	Ryan Dolan	"Only Love Survives"	English	26 ◁	5	8	54
2014	Can-linn feat. Kasey Smith	"Heartbeat"	English	Failed to qualify		12	35
2015	Molly Sterling	"Playing with Numbers"	English	Failed to qualify		12	35
2016	Nicky Byrne	"Sunlight"	English	Failed to qualify		15	46
2017	Brendan Murray	"Dying to Try"	English	Failed to qualify		13	86
2018	Ryan O'Shaughnessy	"Together"	English	16	136	6	179
2019	Sarah McTernan	"22"	English	Failed to qualify		18 ◁	16
2020	Lesley Roy ◇	"Story of My Life" ◇	English ◇	Contest cancelled (Note: The 2020 contest was cancelled due to the COVID-19 pandemic.)			
2021	Lesley Roy	"Maps"	English	Failed to qualify		16 ◁	20
2022	Brooke	"That's Rich"	English	Failed to qualify		15	47
2023	Wild Youth	"We Are One"	English	Failed to qualify		12	10
2024	Bambie Thug	"Doomsday Blue"	English	6	278	3	124
2025	Emmy	"Laika Party"	English	Failed to qualify		13	28

=== Congratulations: 50 Years of the Eurovision Song Contest ===
Ireland was one of two countries to have two entries entered into Congratulations: 50 Years of the Eurovision Song Contest, with the 1980 entry "What's Another Year?" and the 1987 "Hold Me Now". Co-host of the 1997 contest Ronan Keating appeared. Johnny Logan performed his single "When a Woman Loved a Man". Irish winners Eimear Quinn, Charlie McGettigan and Linda Martin performed as backing singers to most of the songs with Jakob Sveistrup who represented Denmark in 2005. Marty Whelan provided commentary of the contest for Ireland on RTÉ.

Artist	Song	Language	At Congratulations				At Eurovision		
Artist	Song	Language	Final	Points	Semi	Points	Year	Place	Points
Johnny Logan	"What's Another Year"	English	Failed to qualify		12	74	1980	1	143
Johnny Logan	"Hold Me Now"	English	3	262	3	182	1987	1	172

== Hostings ==
Ireland is the only country to have hosted multiple contests in succession; three in a row between 1993 and 1995. Six of the seven contests held in Ireland have been held in Dublin; three at the Point Theatre, two at the RDS Simmonscourt and one at the Gaiety Theatre. In addition, the 1993 contest was held in Millstreet, County Cork. Dublin holds the record for hosting the most contests of any Eurovision host city.

Year	Location	Venue	Executive producer	Director	Musical director	Presenter(s)	Ref.
1971	Dublin	Gaiety Theatre	Joe Kearns	Tom McGrath	Colman Pearce	Bernadette Ní Ghallchóir	
1981	Dublin	RDS Simmonscourt	Noel D. Greene	Ian McGarry	Noel Kelehan	Doireann Ní Bhriain	
1988	Dublin	RDS Simmonscourt	Liam Miller	Declan Lowney	Noel Kelehan	Michelle Rocca and Pat Kenny	
1993	Millstreet	Green Glens Arena	Liam Miller	Anita Notaro	Noel Kelehan	Fionnuala Sweeney	
1994	Dublin	Point Theatre	Moya Doherty	Patrick Cowap	Noel Kelehan	Cynthia Ní Mhurchú and Gerry Ryan	
1995	Dublin	Point Theatre	John McHugh	John Comiskey	Noel Kelehan	Mary Kennedy	
1997	Dublin	Point Theatre	Noel Curran	Ian McGarry	Frank McNamara	Carrie Crowley and Ronan Keating	

== Awards ==
=== Marcel Bezençon Awards ===
Year	Category	Performer	Song	Final	Points	Host city	Ref.
2011	Artistic Award (Note: Voted by commentators.)	Jedward	"Lipstick"	8	119	(Germany) Düsseldorf	

== Related involvement ==
=== Conductors ===
Year	Conductor (Note: All conductors are of Irish nationality unless otherwise noted.)	Notes	Ref.
1965	(Italy) Gianni Ferrio	Host conductor (Note: Conducted by Noel Kelehan at the national final.)	
1966	Noel Kelehan		
1967	Noel Kelehan		
1968	Noel Kelehan		
1969	Noel Kelehan		
1970	(Netherlands) Dolf van der Linden	Host conductor (Note: Conducted by Noel Kelehan at the national final.)	
1971	Noel Kelehan		
1972	Colman Pearce		
1973	Colman Pearce		
1974	Colman Pearce		
1975	Colman Pearce		
1976	Noel Kelehan		
1977	Noel Kelehan		
1978	Noel Kelehan		
1979	Pronnsías Ó Duinn	(Note: Conducted by Noel Kelehan at the national final.)	
1980	Noel Kelehan		
1981	Noel Kelehan		
1982	Noel Kelehan		
1984	Noel Kelehan		
1985	Noel Kelehan		
1986	Noel Kelehan		
1987	Noel Kelehan		
1988	Noel Kelehan		
1989	Noel Kelehan		
1990	Noel Kelehan		
1991	Noel Kelehan		
1992	Noel Kelehan		
1993	Noel Kelehan	(Note: Kelehan also conducted the Bosnian entry.)	
1994	No conductor	(Note: Irish commentator Pat Kenny and British commentator Terry Wogan both erroneously credit Kelehan as the conductor of the Irish entry. The song was performed without orchestral accompaniment. Kelehan did, however, conduct the Greek, Polish, and Romanian entries.)	
1995	Noel Kelehan	(Note: Kelehan also conducted the Polish entry. The interval act, "Lumen," was conducted by Proinnsías Ó Duinn.)	
1996	Noel Kelehan		
1997	No conductor	(Note: That year's Irish national final was presented with a smaller band.)	
1998	Noel Kelehan	(Note: That year's Irish national final was presented without an orchestra.)	

=== Heads of delegation ===
Year	Head of delegation	Ref.
2008	Michael Kealy	
2009–2012	Julian Vignoles	
2013–2024	Michael Kealy	
2025	Michael Kealy and Clare Hughes	
~~2026~~	~~Alan Tyler~~	

=== Commentators and spokespersons ===
For the show's broadcast on RTÉ, various commentators have provided commentary on the contest in the English language. At the Eurovision Song Contest after all points are calculated, the presenters of the show call upon each voting country to invite each respective spokesperson to announce the results of their vote on-screen.

Over the years RTÉ commentary has been provided by several experienced radio and television presenters, including Larry Gogan, Jimmy Greeley, Gay Byrne, Ronan Collins, Pat Kenny, and Mike Murphy. Marty Whelan has provided the RTÉ television commentary since 2000, although Whelan himself had previously commentated for the 1987 event. Ireland did not participate in the 1983 edition in Germany due to a strike, nor did they send a commentator to Munich that year, but instead broadcast the BBC feed of the contest with Terry Wogan as commentator, who welcomed viewers in Ireland during his introduction. RTÉ Radio, however, did provide commentary by Brendan Balfe.

Commentators and spokespersons
Year	Television		Radio		Spokesperson	Ref.
Year	Channel	Commentator(s)	Channel	Commentator(s)	Spokesperson	Ref.
1963	Telefís Éireann	Unknown	No broadcast		Did not participate	
1964	Telefís Éireann	Unknown	No broadcast		Did not participate	
1965	Telefís Éireann	Bunny Carr	Radió Éireann	Kevin Roche	Unknown	
1966	Telefís Éireann	Brendan O'Reilly	Radió Éireann	Kevin Roche	Frank Hall	
1967	RTÉ	Brendan O'Reilly	RTÉ Radio	Kevin Roche	Gay Byrne	
1968	RTÉ	Brendan O'Reilly	RTÉ Radio	Kevin Roche	Gay Byrne	
1969	RTÉ	Gay Byrne	RTÉ Radio	Kevin Roche	Brendan O'Reilly	
1970	RTÉ	Valerie McGovern	RTÉ Radio	Kevin Roche	John Skehan	
1971	RTÉ	Noel Andrews	RTÉ Radio	Kevin Roche	No spokesperson	
1972	RTÉ	Mike Murphy	RTÉ Radio	Liam Devally and Kevin Roche	No spokesperson	
1973	RTÉ	Mike Murphy	RTÉ Radio	Liam Devally	No spokesperson	
1974	RTÉ	Mike Murphy	RTÉ Radio	Unknown	Brendan Balfe	
1975	RTÉ	Mike Murphy	RTÉ Radio	Liam Devally	Unknown	
1976	RTÉ	Mike Murphy	RTÉ Radio	Unknown	Unknown	
1977	RTÉ	Mike Murphy	RTÉ Radio	Liam Devally	Brendan Balfe	
1978	RTÉ	Larry Gogan	RTÉ Radio	Liam Devally	Unknown	
1979	RTÉ 1	Mike Murphy	RTÉ Radio	Liam Devally	David Hefferman	
1980	RTÉ 1	Larry Gogan	RTÉ Radio 1	Pat Kenny	David Hefferman	
1981	RTÉ 1	Larry Gogan	RTÉ Radio 1	Pat Kenny	Unknown	
1982	RTÉ 1	Larry Gogan	RTÉ Radio 1	Pat Kenny	John Skehan	
1983	RTÉ 1	Terry Wogan (Note: Commentary provided by United Kingdom's BBC)	RTÉ Radio 1	Brendan Balfe	Did not participate	
1984	RTÉ 1	Gay Byrne	RTÉ Radio 1	Larry Gogan	Unknown	
1985	RTÉ 1	Linda Martin	RTÉ Radio 1	Larry Gogan	Unknown	
1986	RTÉ 1	Brendan Balfe	RTÉ Radio 1	Larry Gogan	Unknown	
1987	RTÉ 1	Marty Whelan	RTÉ FM3	Larry Gogan	Unknown	
1988	RTÉ 1	Mike Murphy	RTÉ FM3	Larry Gogan	John Skehan (Note: Confirmed by host Pat Kenny during the broadcast.)	
1989	RTÉ 1	Ronan Collins and Michelle Rocca	RTÉ Radio 1	Larry Gogan	Eileen Dunne	
1990	RTÉ 1	Jimmy Greeley and Clíona Ní Bhuachalla	RTÉ Radio 1	Larry Gogan	Eileen Dunne	
1991	RTÉ 1	Pat Kenny	RTÉ Radio 1	Larry Gogan	Eileen Dunne	
1992	RTÉ 1	Pat Kenny	2FM	Larry Gogan	Eileen Dunne	
1993	RTÉ 1	Pat Kenny	RTÉ Radio 1	Larry Gogan	Eileen Dunne	
1994	RTÉ 1	Pat Kenny	RTÉ Radio 1	Larry Gogan	Eileen Dunne	
1995	RTÉ 1	Pat Kenny	RTÉ Radio 1	Larry Gogan	Eileen Dunne	
1996	RTÉ 1	Pat Kenny	RTÉ Radio 1	Larry Gogan	Eileen Dunne	
1997	RTÉ 1	Pat Kenny	RTÉ Radio 1	Larry Gogan	Eileen Dunne	
1998	RTÉ 1	Pat Kenny	RTÉ Radio 1	Larry Gogan	Eileen Dunne	
1999	RTÉ 1	Pat Kenny	RTÉ Radio 1	Larry Gogan	Clare McNamara	
2000	RTÉ 1	Marty Whelan	RTÉ Radio 1	Larry Gogan	Derek Mooney	
2001	RTÉ 1	Marty Whelan	Unknown	Larry Gogan	Bláthnaid Ní Chofaigh	
2002	Unknown	Marty Whelan	No broadcast		Did not participate	
2003	RTÉ 1	Marty Whelan and Phil Coulter	No broadcast		Pamela Flood	
2004	N2 (semi-final); RTÉ 1 (final)	Marty Whelan	No broadcast		Johnny Logan	
2005	RTÉ 2 (semi-final); RTÉ 1 (final)	Marty Whelan	No broadcast		Dana	
2006	RTÉ 2 (semi-final); RTÉ 1 (final)	Marty Whelan	No broadcast		Eimear Quinn	
2007	RTÉ 2 (semi-final); RTÉ 1 (final)	Marty Whelan	RTÉ Radio 1 (final)	Larry Gogan	Linda Martin	
2008	RTÉ 2 (semi-finals); RTÉ 1 (final)	Marty Whelan	RTÉ Radio 1 (semi-final, final)	Larry Gogan	Niamh Kavanagh	
2009	RTÉ 2 (semi-finals); RTÉ 1 (final)	Marty Whelan	RTÉ Radio 1 (semi-final, final)	Maxi	Derek Mooney	
2010	RTÉ 2 (semi-finals); RTÉ 1 (final)	Marty Whelan	RTÉ Radio 1 (final)	Maxi	Derek Mooney	
2011	RTÉ 2 (semi-finals); RTÉ 1 (final)	Marty Whelan	RTÉ Radio 1 (semi-final, final)	Shay Byrne and Zbyszek Zalinski	Derek Mooney	
2012	RTÉ 2 (semi-finals); RTÉ 1 (final)	Marty Whelan	RTÉ Radio 1 (final)	Shay Byrne and Zbyszek Zalinski	Gráinne Seoige	
2013	RTÉ 2 (semi-finals); RTÉ 1 (final)	Marty Whelan	RTÉ Radio 1 (semi-final, final)	Shay Byrne and Zbyszek Zalinski	Nicky Byrne	
2014	RTÉ 2 (semi-finals); RTÉ 1 (final)	Marty Whelan	RTÉ Radio 1 (semi-final, final)	Shay Byrne and Zbyszek Zalinski	Nicky Byrne	
2015	RTÉ 2 (semi-finals); RTÉ 1 (final)	Marty Whelan	RTÉ Radio 1 (semi-final, final)	Shay Byrne and Zbyszek Zalinski	Nicky Byrne	
2016	RTÉ 2 (semi-finals); RTÉ 1 (final)	Marty Whelan	RTÉ Radio 1 (semi-final, final)	Neil Doherty and Zbyszek Zalinski	Sinéad Kennedy	
2017	RTÉ 2 (semi-finals); RTÉ 1 (final)	Marty Whelan	RTÉ Radio 1 (semi-final, final)	Neil Doherty and Zbyszek Zalinski	Nicky Byrne	
2018	RTÉ 2 (semi-finals); RTÉ 1 (final)	Marty Whelan	RTÉ Radio 1 (semi-final); RTÉ 2fm (final)	Neil Doherty and Zbyszek Zalinski	Nicky Byrne	
2019	RTÉ 2 (semi-finals); RTÉ 1 (final)	Marty Whelan	RTÉ Radio 1 (semi-final); RTÉ 2fm (final)	Neil Doherty and Zbyszek Zalinski	Sinéad Kennedy	
2020	Not announced before cancellation					N/A
2021	RTÉ 2 (semi-finals); RTÉ 1 (final)	Marty Whelan	RTÉ Radio 1 (semi-final); RTÉ 2fm (final)	Neil Doherty and Zbyszek Zalinski	Ryan O'Shaughnessy	
2022	RTÉ 2 (semi-finals); RTÉ 1 (final)	Marty Whelan	RTÉ Radio 1 (semi-final, final)	Neil Doherty and Zbyszek Zalinski	Linda Martin	
2023	RTÉ 2 (SF2); RTÉ 1 (SF1, final)	Marty Whelan	RTÉ 2fm (semi-final, final)	Neil Doherty and Zbyszek Zalinski	Niamh Kavanagh	
2024	RTÉ 2 (SF2); RTÉ 1 (SF1, final)	Marty Whelan	RTÉ 2fm (semi-final, final)	Neil Doherty and Zbyszek Zalinski	Paul Harrington	
2025	RTÉ 2 (SF2); RTÉ 1 (SF1, final)	Marty Whelan	No broadcast		Nicky Byrne	
2026	No broadcast		No broadcast		Did not participate	

== Photo gallery ==
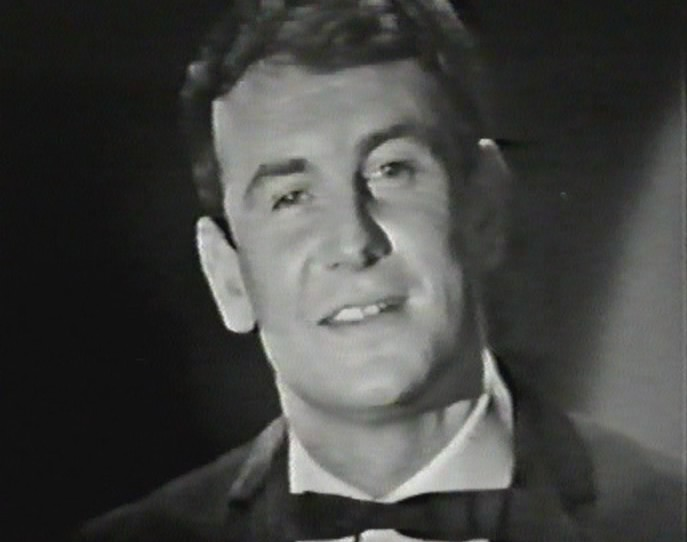
Butch Moore in Naples (1965)

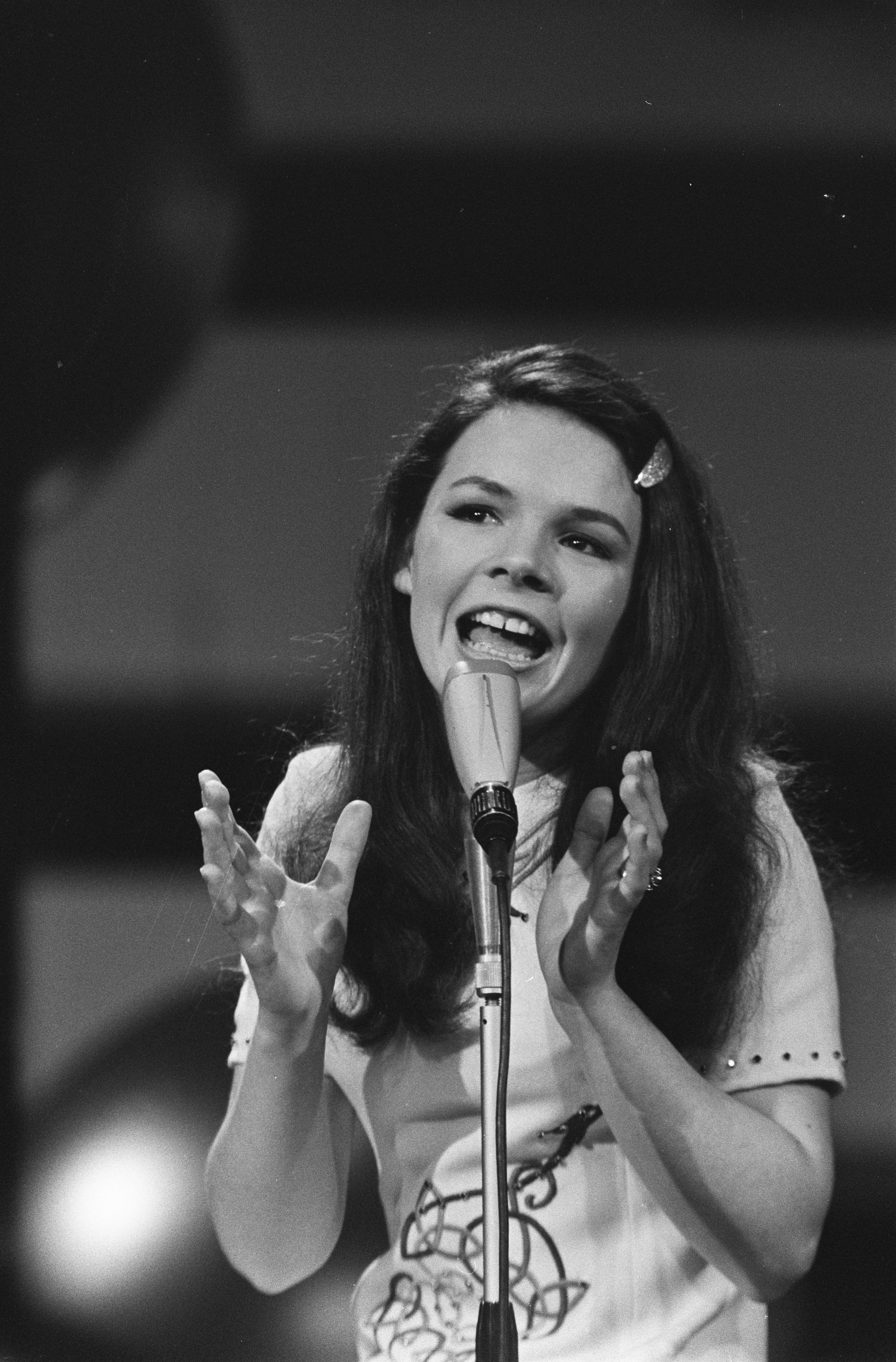
Dana in Amsterdam (1970)

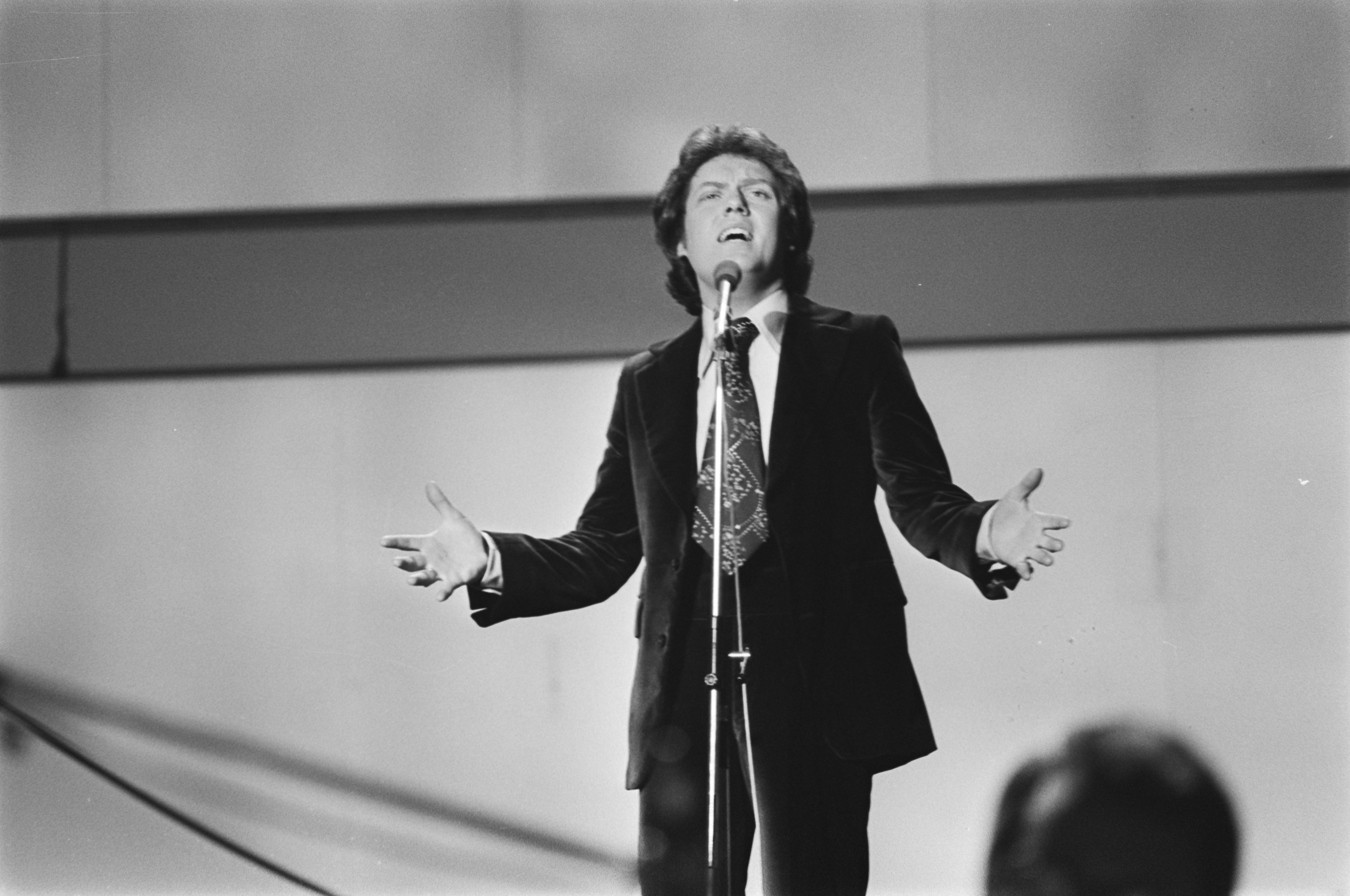
Red Hurley in The Hague (1976)

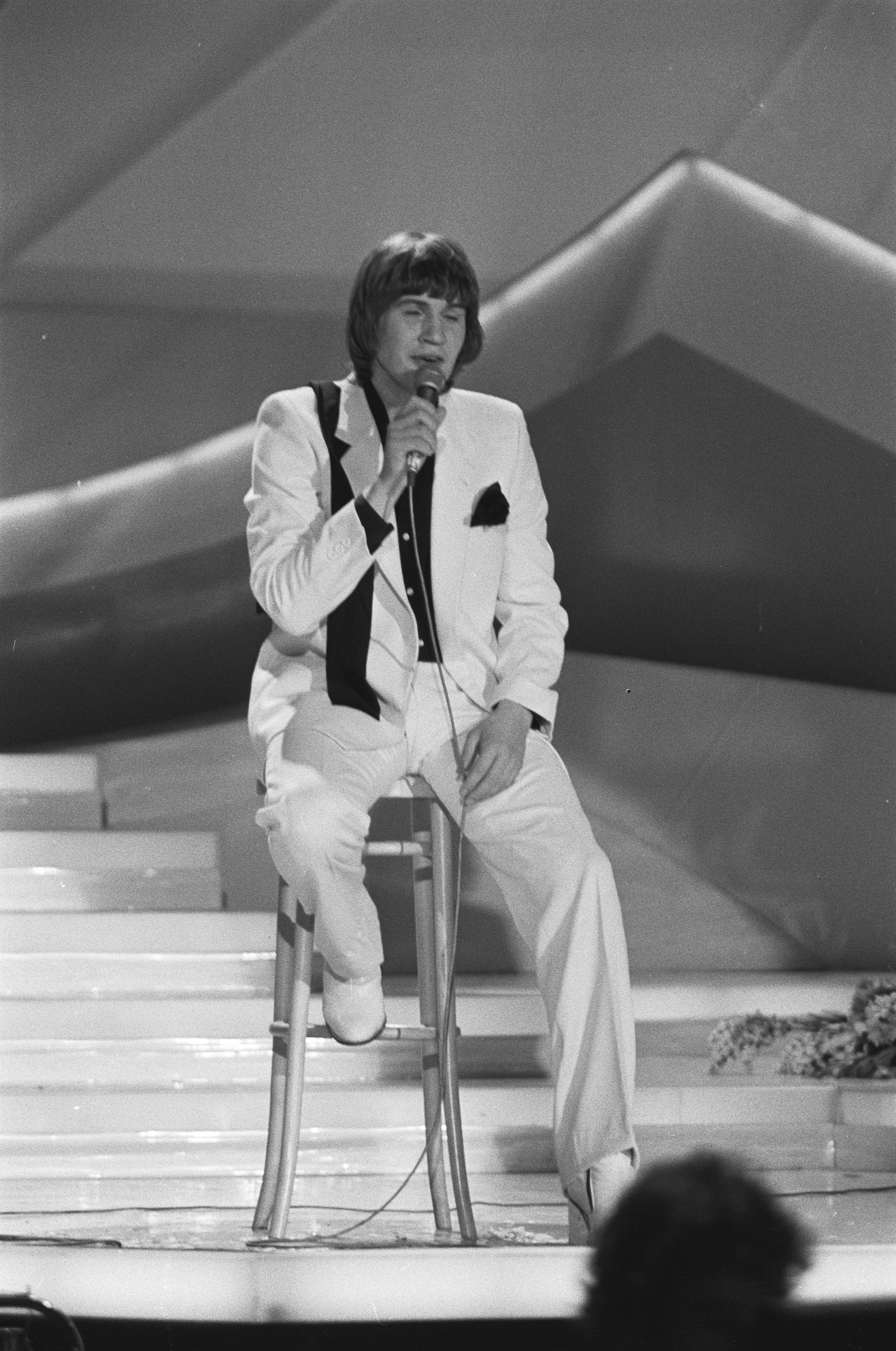
Johnny Logan in The Hague (1980)

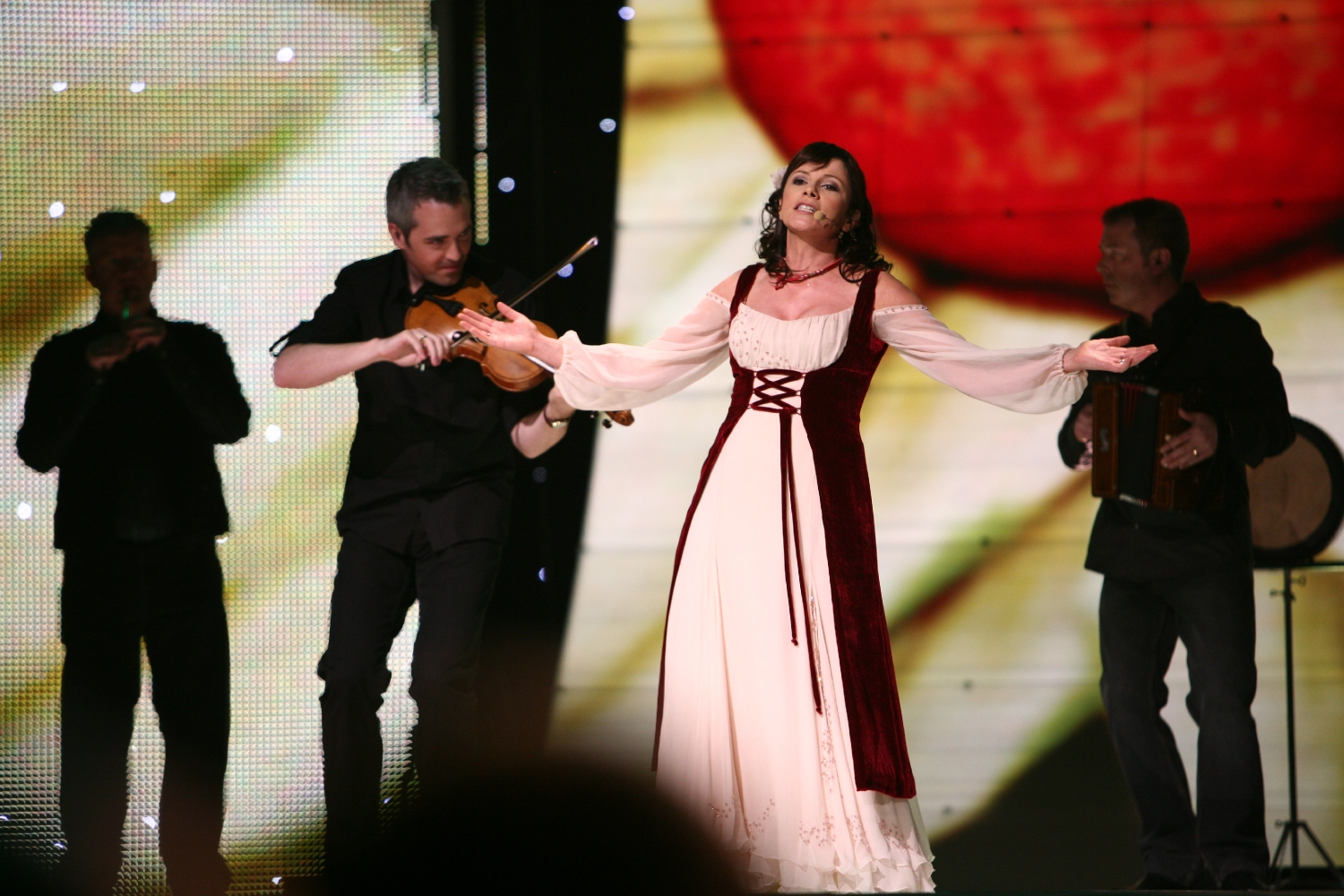
Dervish in Helsinki (2007)

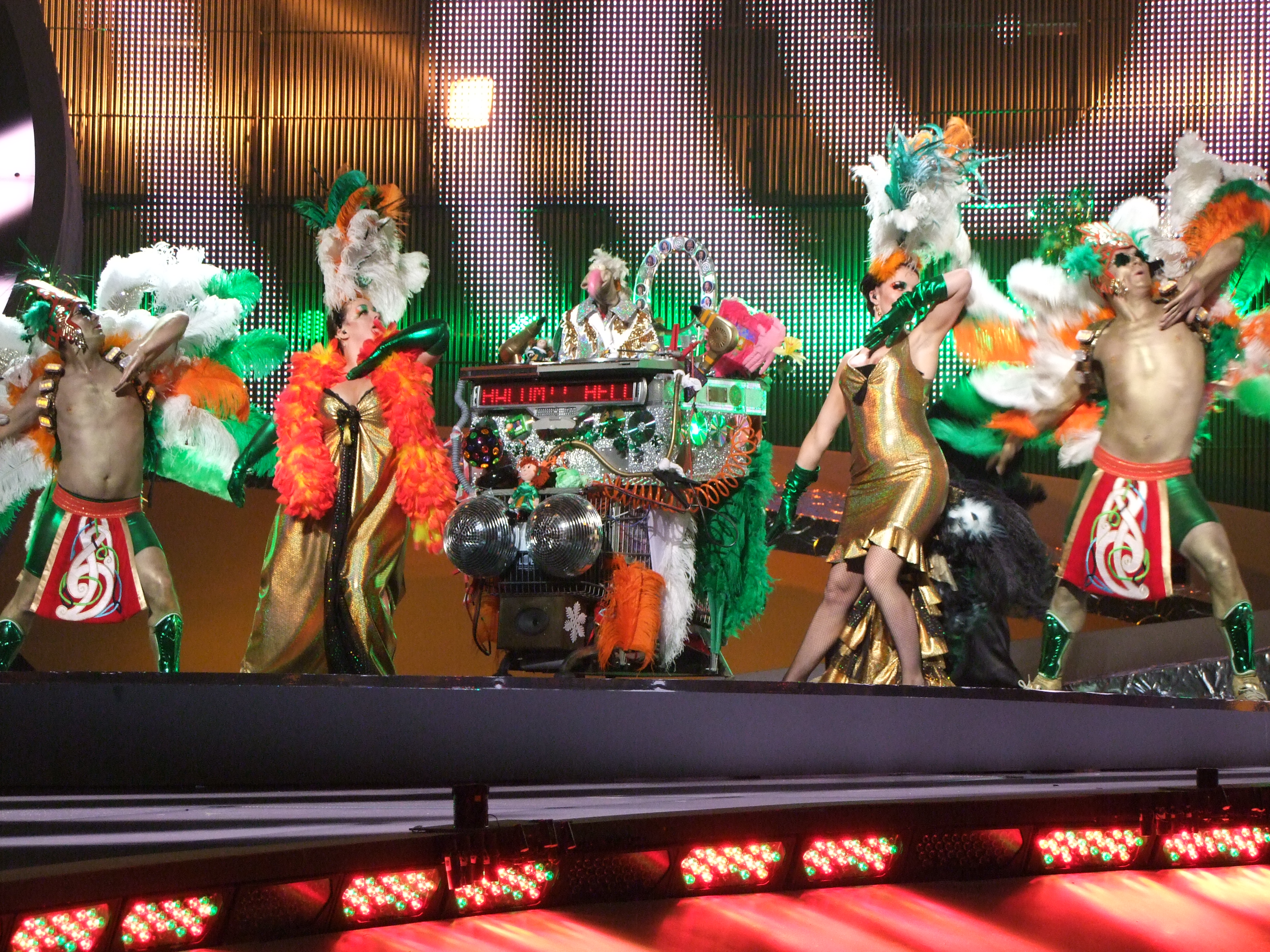
Dustin the Turkey in Belgrade (2008)

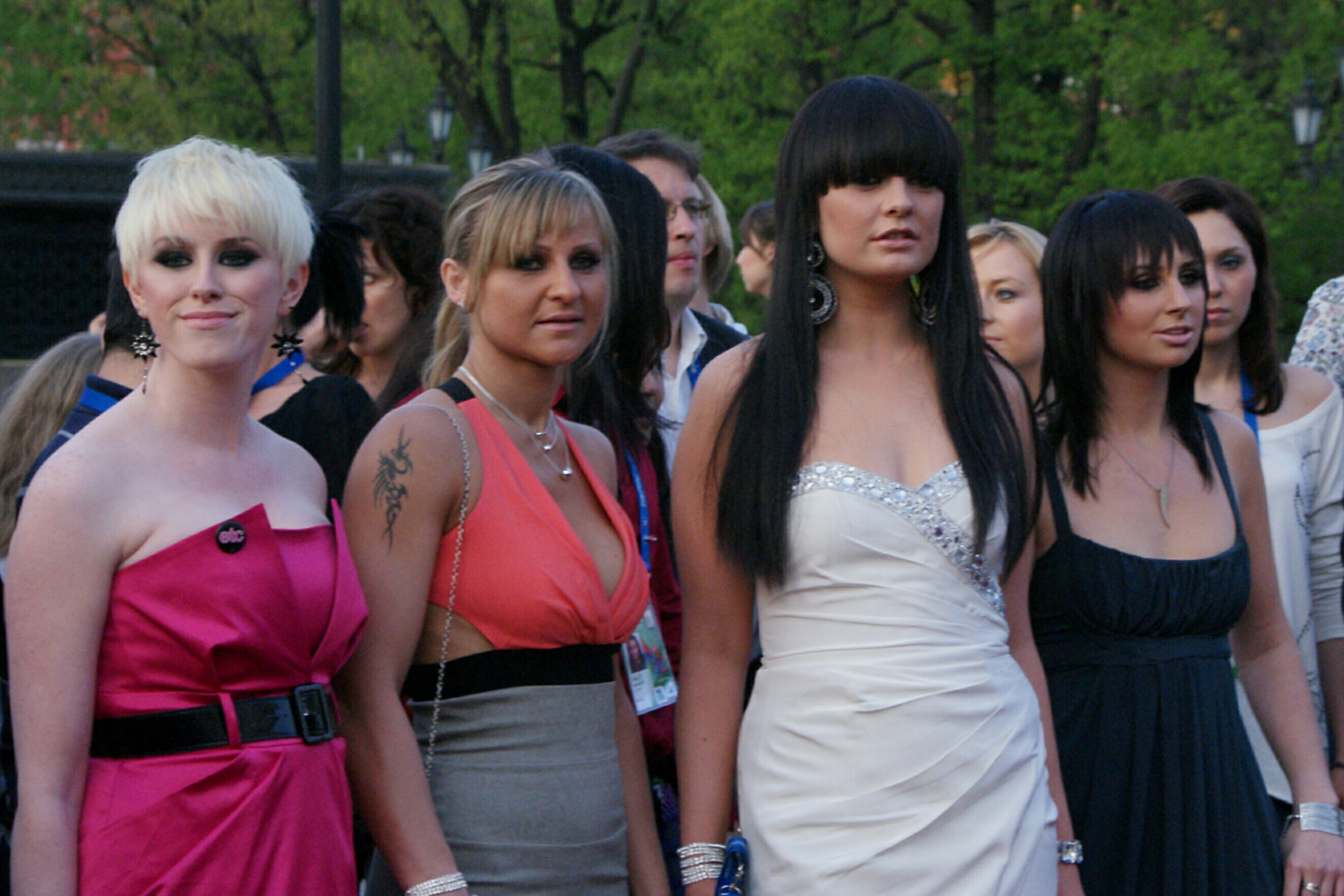
Sinéad Mulvey & Black Daisy in Moscow (2009)

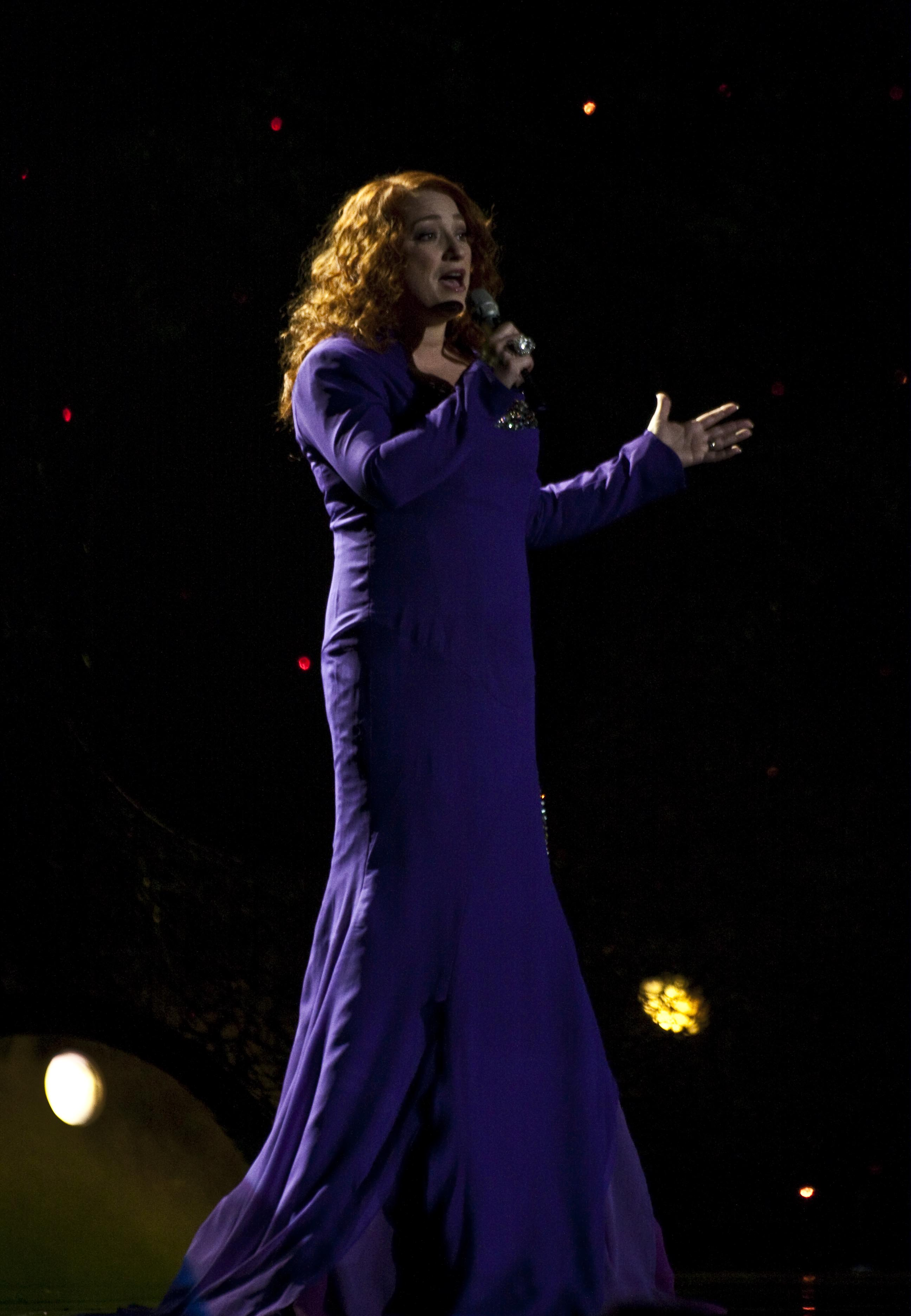
Niamh Kavanagh in Oslo (2010)

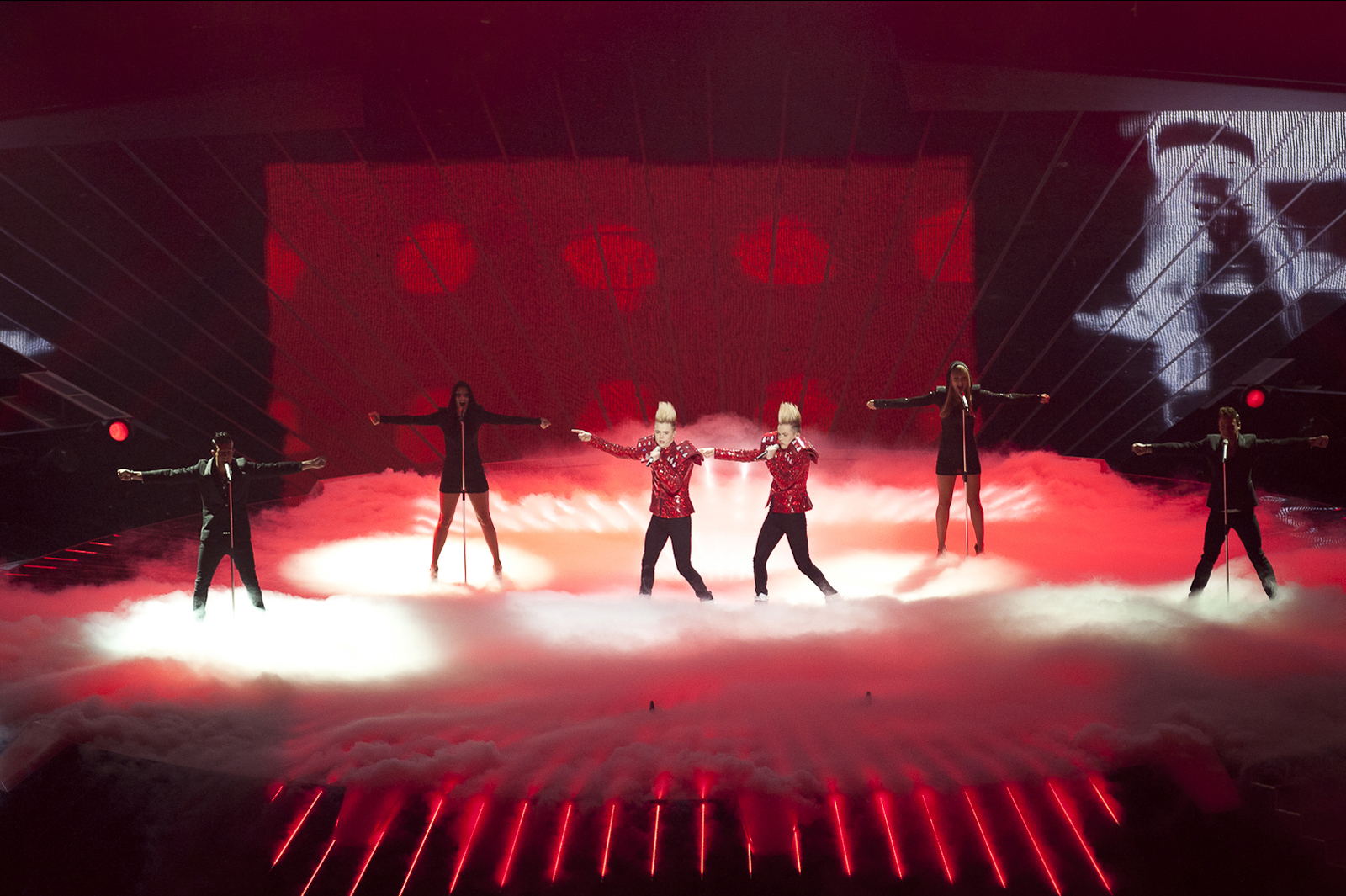
Jedward in Düsseldorf (2011)

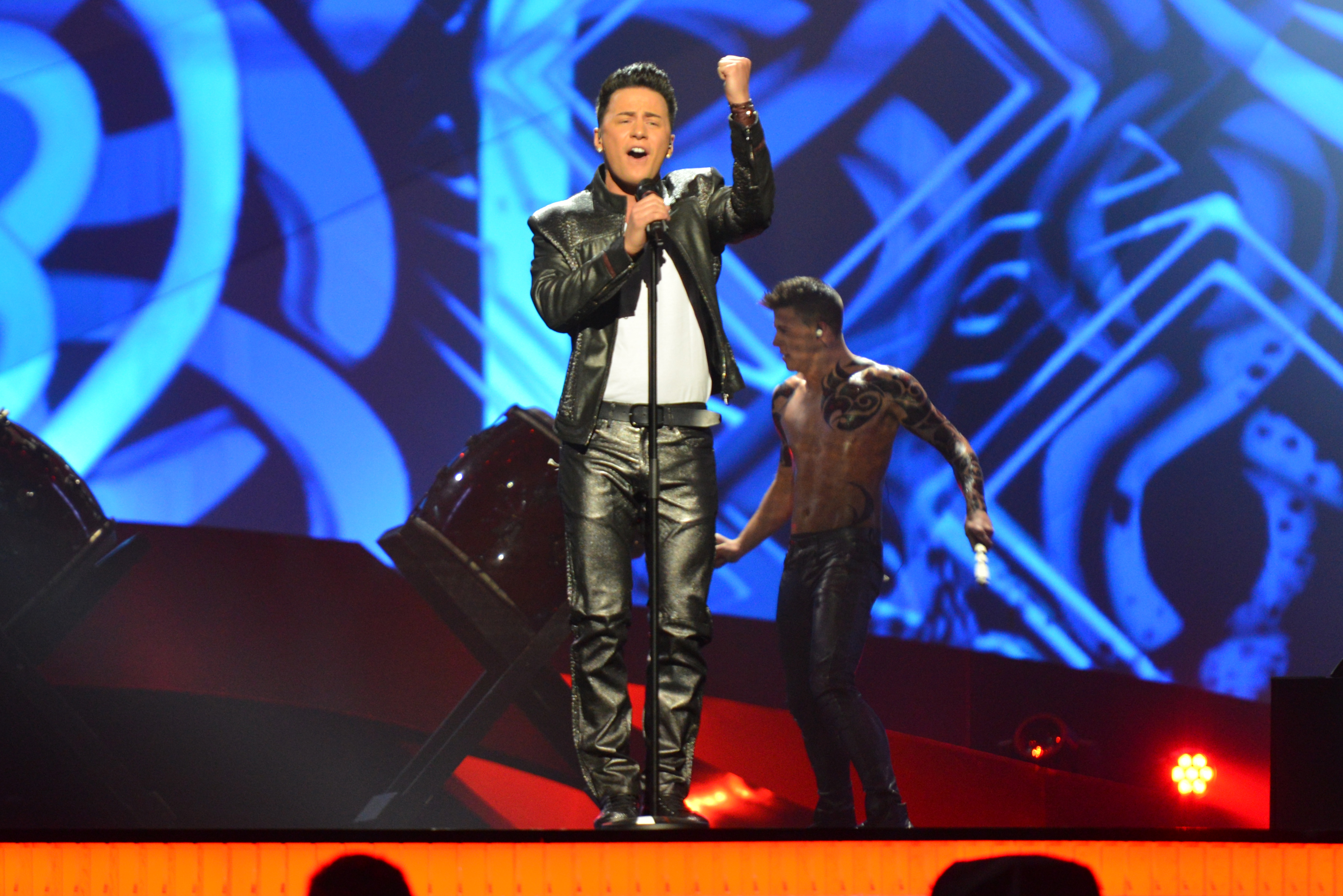
Ryan Dolan in Malmö (2013)

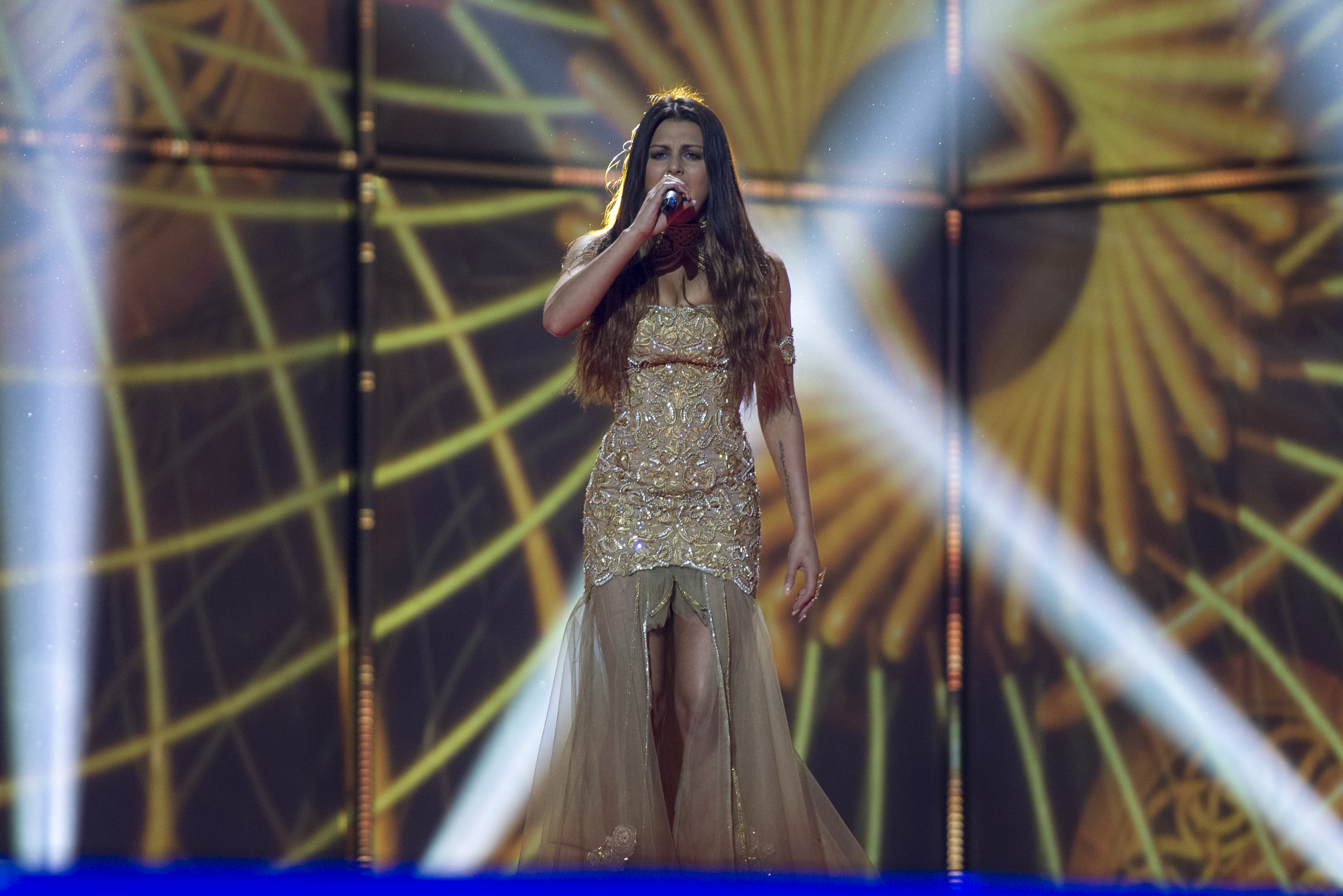
Kasey Smith in Copenhagen (2014)

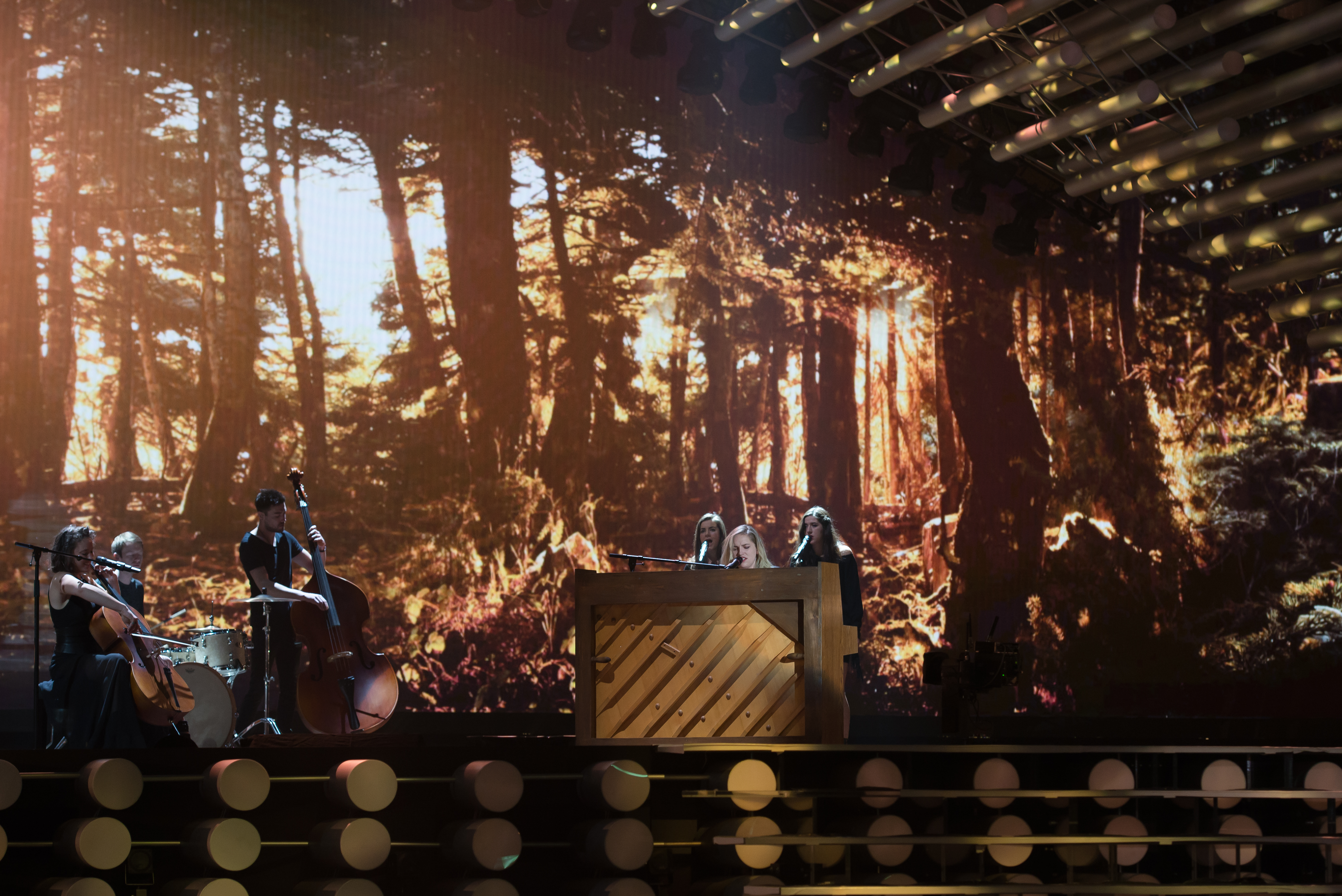
Molly Sterling in Vienna (2015)

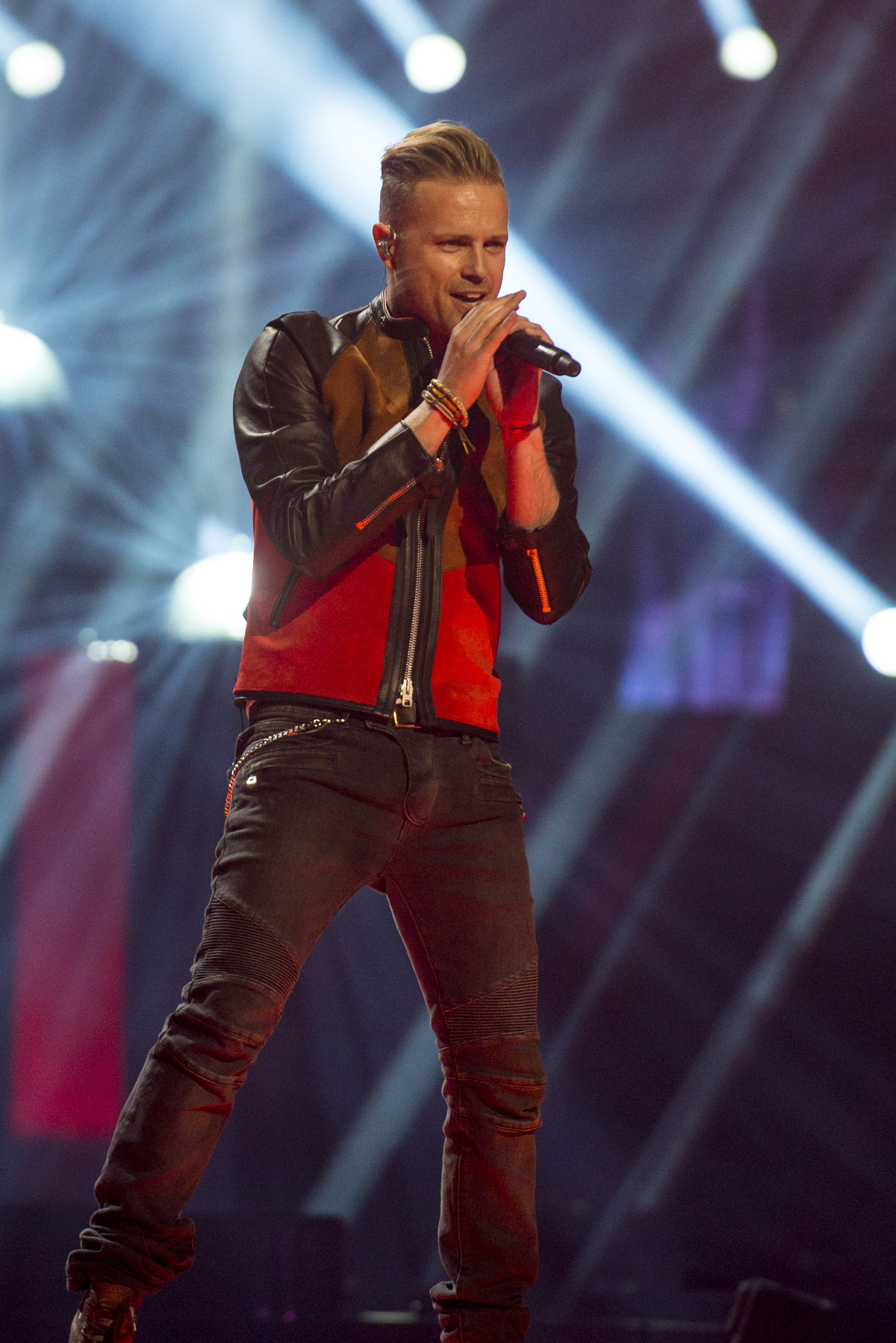
Nicky Byrne in Stockholm (2016)

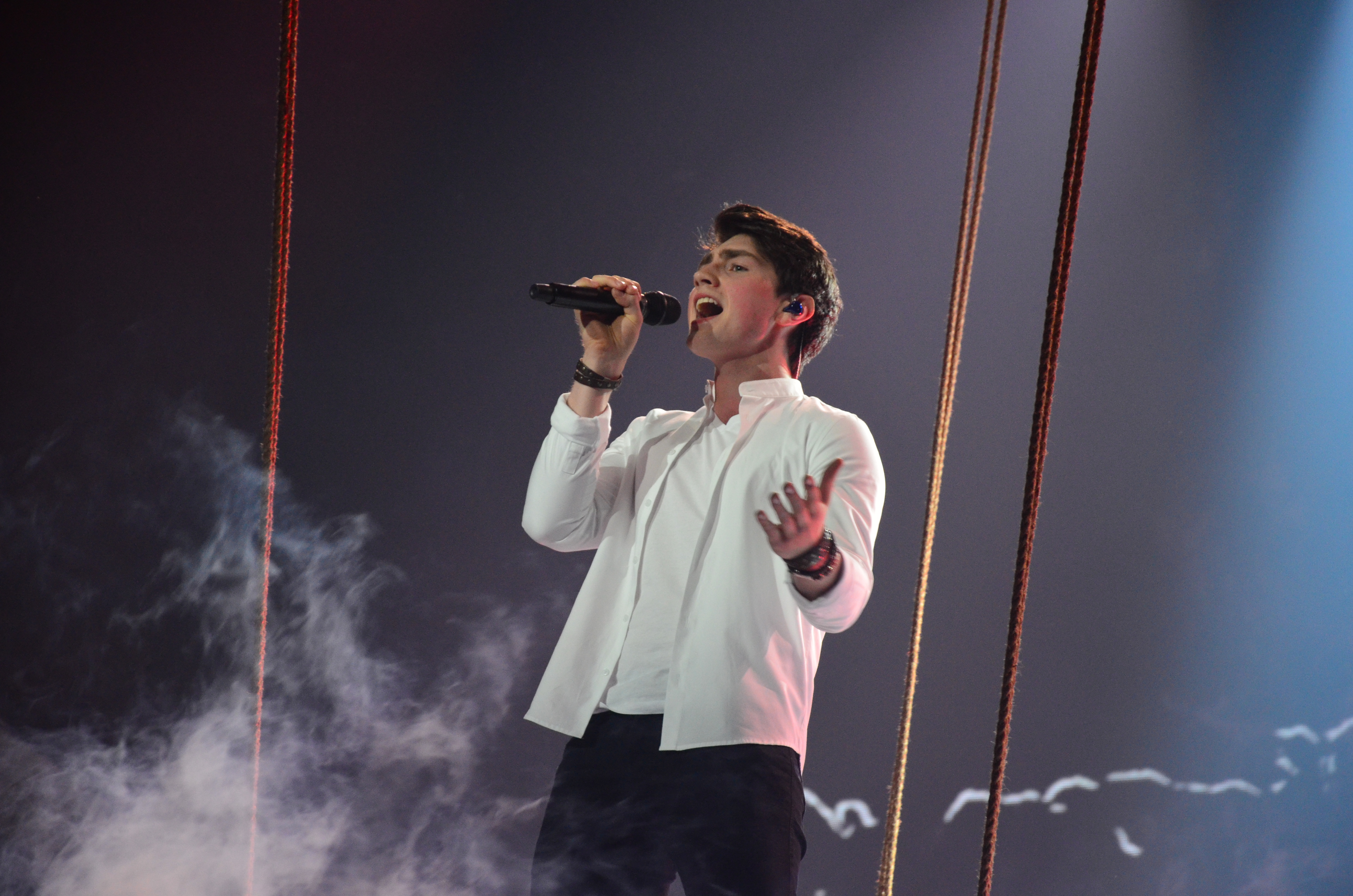
Brendan Murray in Kyiv (2017)

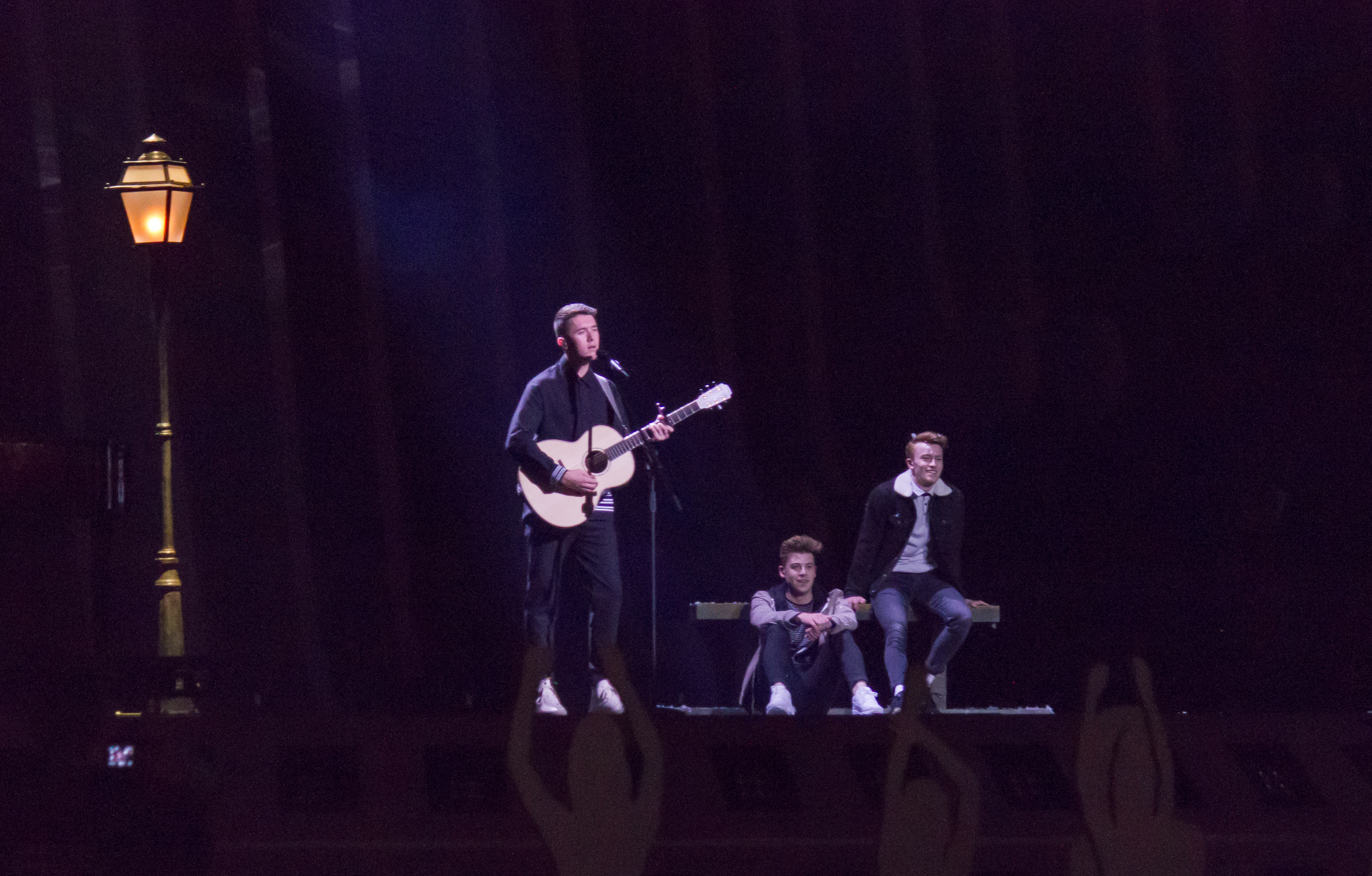
Ryan O'Shaughnessy in Lisbon (2018)

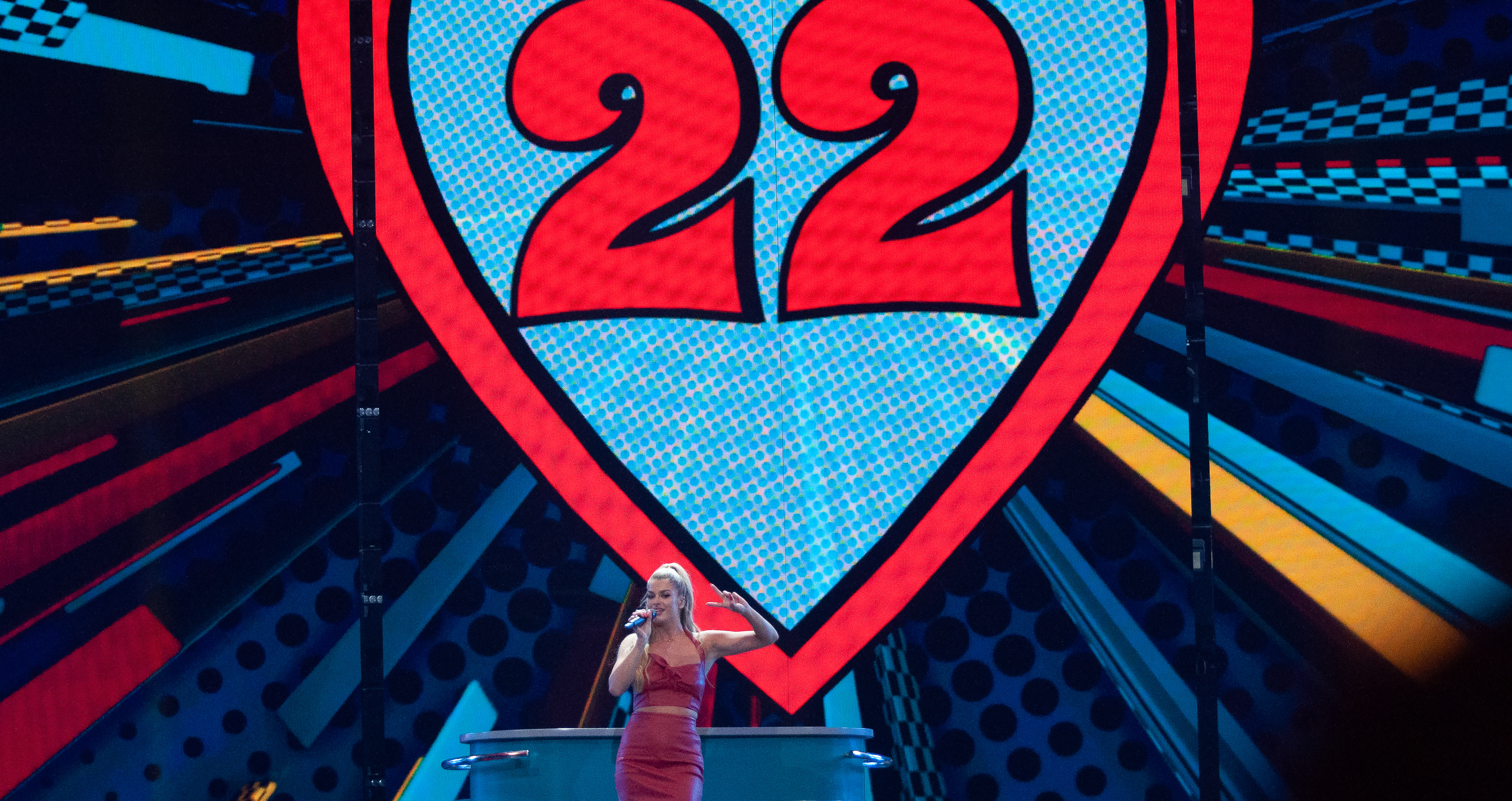
Sarah McTernan in Tel Aviv (2019)

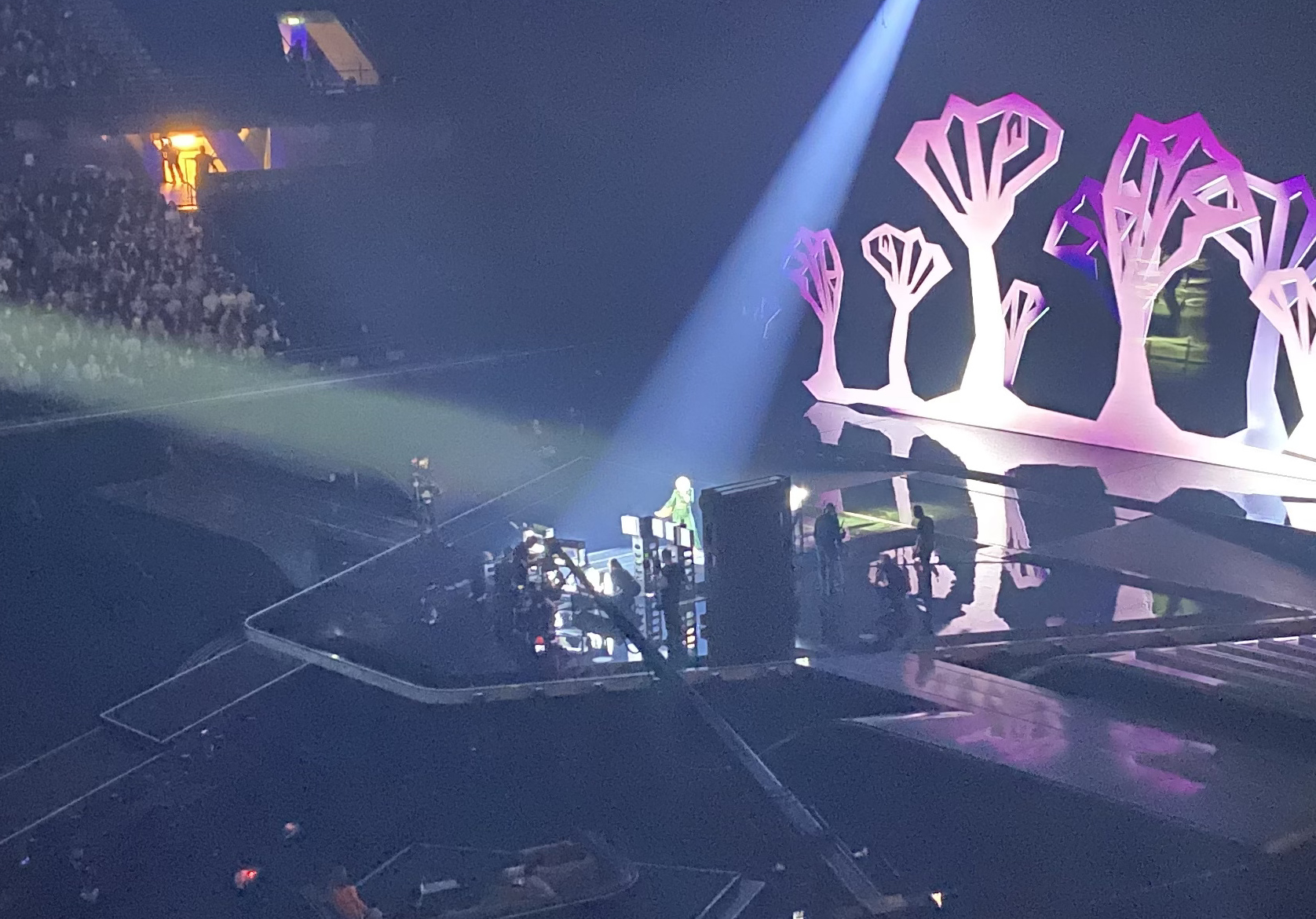
Lesley Roy in Rotterdam (2021)

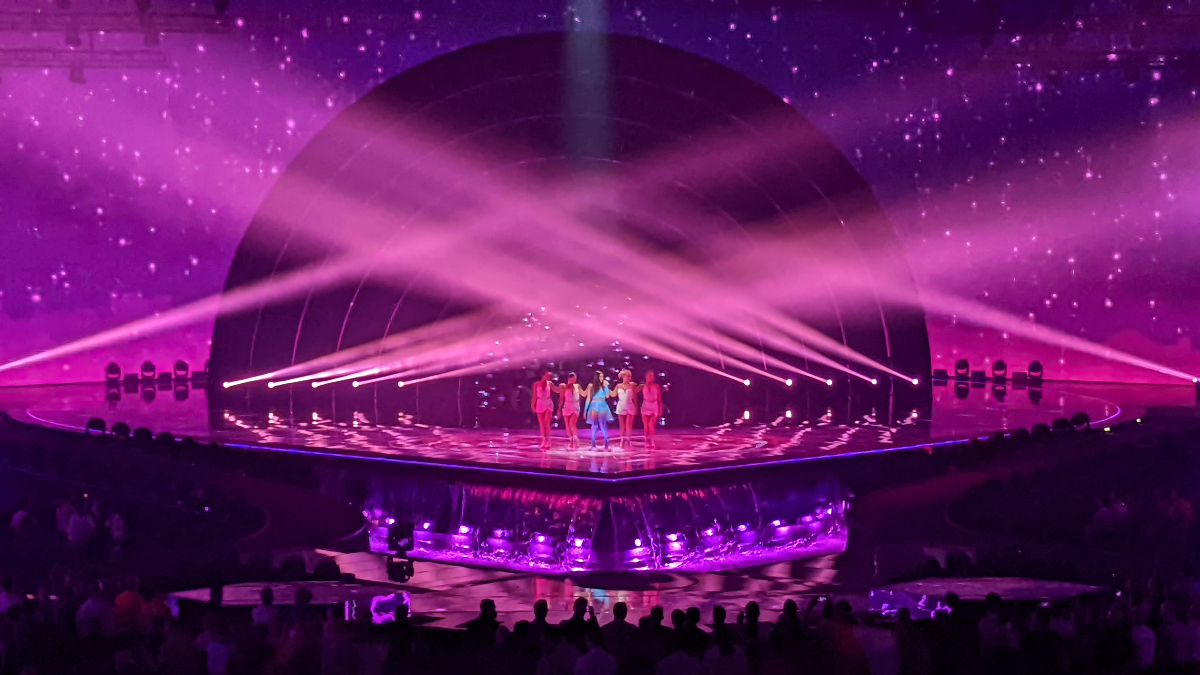
Brooke in Turin (2022)

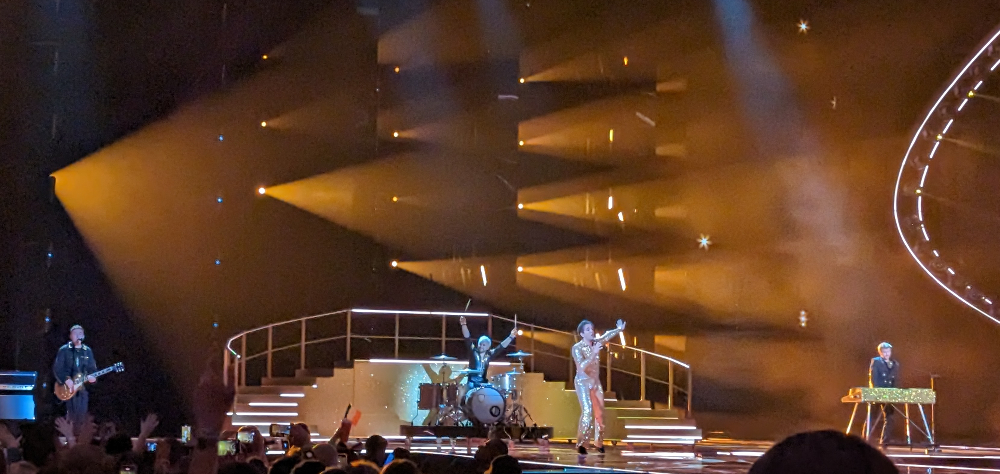
Wild Youth in Liverpool (2023)

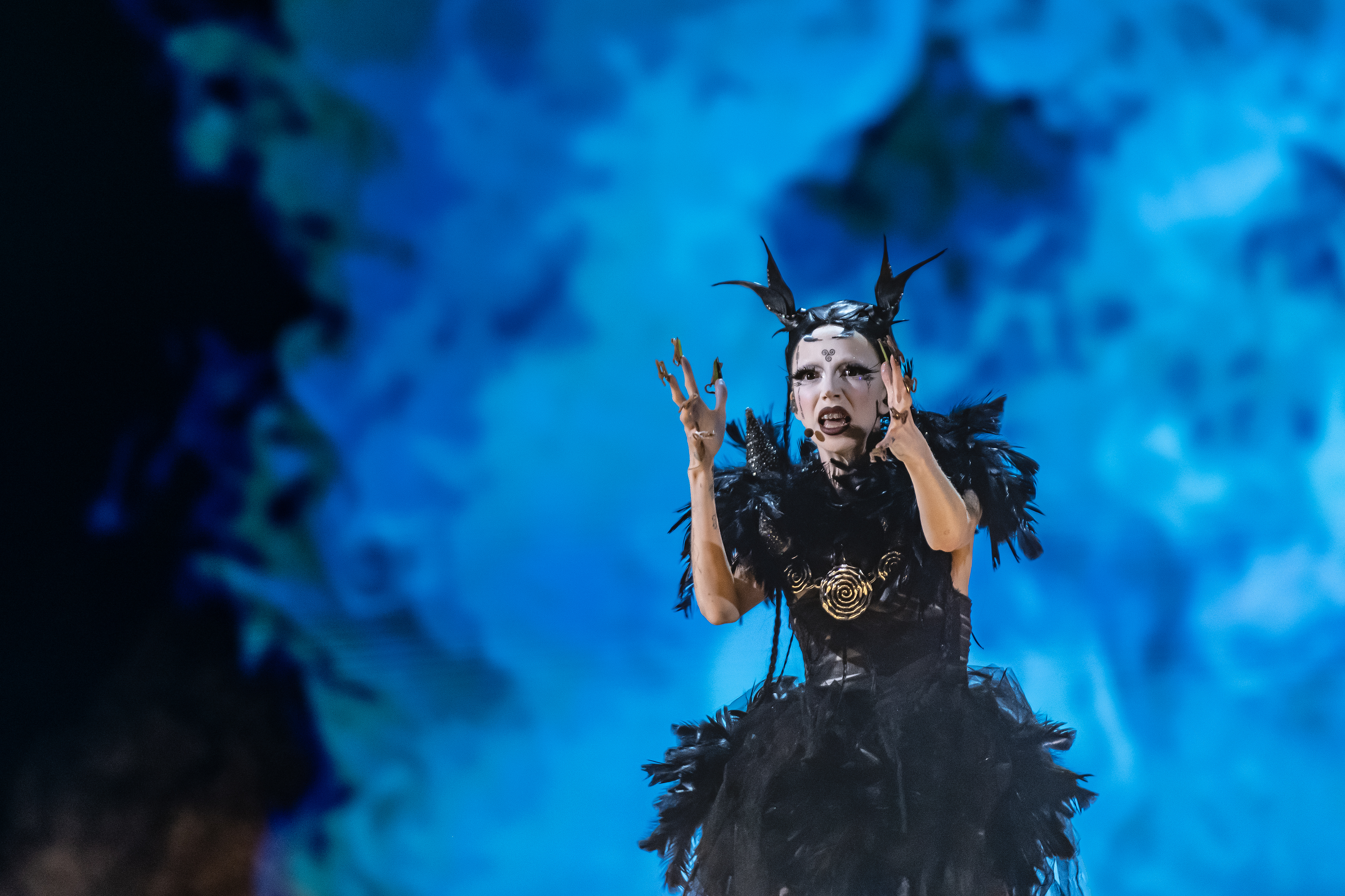
Bambie Thug in Malmö (2024)

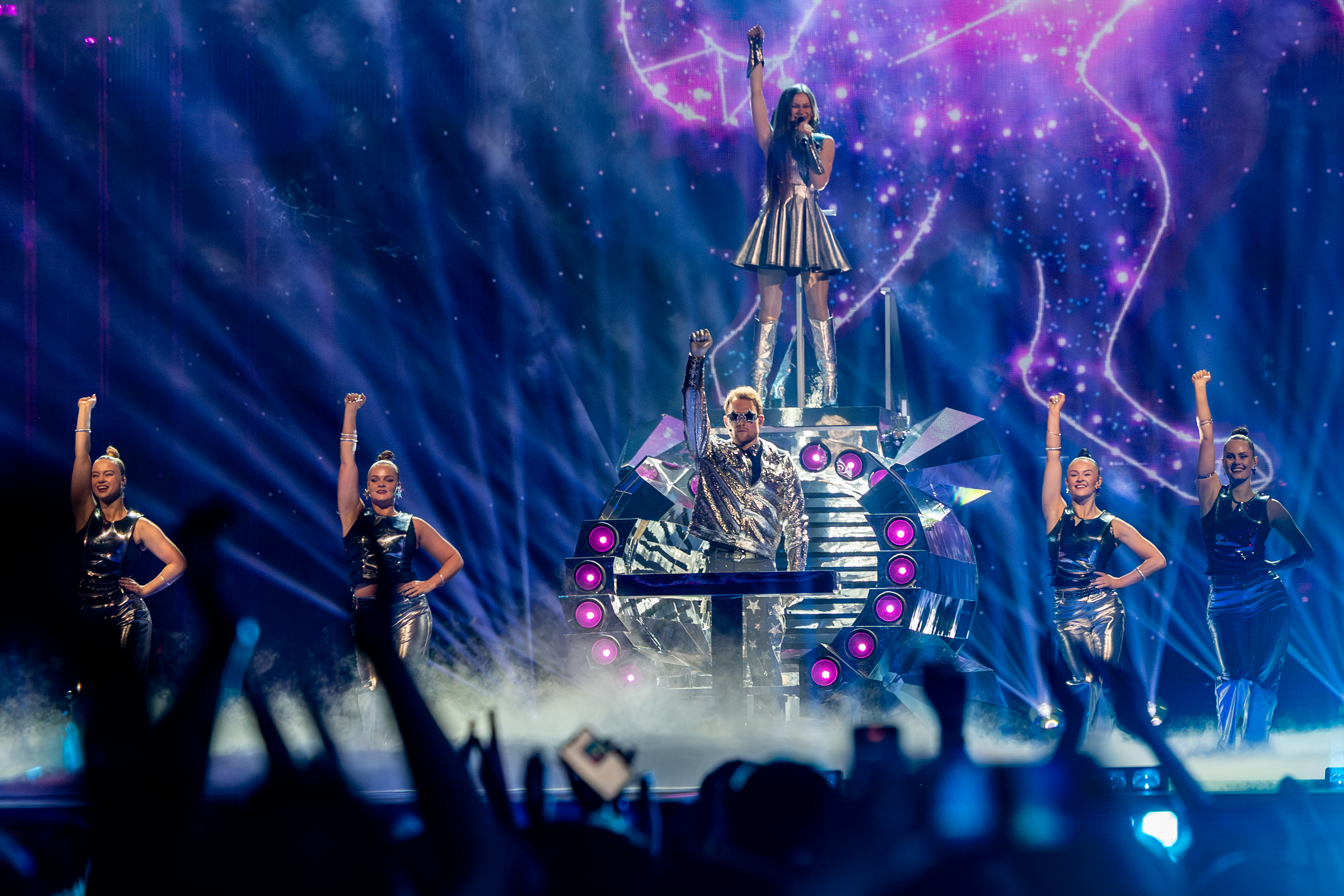
Emmy in Basel (2025)

== See also ==
- Ireland in the Junior Eurovision Song Contest – Junior version of the Eurovision Song Contest.
