= Unbeautiful =

Studio album by Lesley Roy
- Released: September 30, 2008
- Recorded: 2007–2008
- Genres: Alternative rock; power pop
- Length: 46:33 (standard edition); 50:08 (iTunes edition)
- Labels: Religion; Jive
- Producers: Per Aldeheim; Mitch Allan; Andreas Carlsson; Desmond Child; Dr. Luke; David Hodges; Will Hunt; Emanuel Kiriakou; Max Martin (also exec.); Mark Murphy; Harry Sommerdahl; Greg Wells; Rami Yacoub

Singles from Unbeautiful
- 1. "I'm Gone, I'm Going" Released: 17 June 2008; 2. "Unbeautiful" Released: 2008

Professional ratings
Review scores
Source	Rating
Alternative Addiction	3/5 stars
Rawkfist Music	8/10 stars

Unbeautiful is the debut album of Lesley Roy. It was released on September 30, 2008, by Religion Music in her native Ireland and Jive Records elsewhere. It peaked on Billboard's Top Heatseekers chart at No. 5. As of 2026, it is her only album to date.

== Background ==
Lesley Roy began recording the album during 2007. She described the meaning of the album's name, Unbeautiful, as the title of one of her favorite songs on the album — "I called the album that because it's when I hit rock bottom. It's the question a lot of people ask when they're in a relationship, and it's like 'where was the point where you didn't find me attractive anymore?' It's a universal feeling and an unusual word. A lot of people ask me about it and relate to it. And the world is not perfect right now. "Unbeautiful" seems like a realistic title for a lot of things that are happening."

== Track listing ==
No.	Title	Writer(s)	Producer(s)	Length
1.	"I'm Gone, I'm Going"	Lesley Roy, Max Martin, Johan Schuster, Alexander Kronlund	Martin	3:25
2.	"Here for You Now"	Roy, Martin	Martin	3:28
3.	"Slow Goodbye"	Roy, Martin, Lukasz Gottwald, Katy Perry	Martin, Dr. Luke	3:50
4.	"Unbeautiful"	Roy, Martin, Rami Yacoub	Martin, Rami	3:51
5.	"Psycho Bitch"	Roy, Martin, Savan Kotecha	Martin	3:11
6.	"When I Look at You"	Roy, Kara DioGuardi, Greg Wells	Greg Wells	3:27
7.	"Thinking Out Loud"	Roy, Martin	Martin	3:34
8.	"Dead but Breathing"	Roy, Martin, Camela Leierth, Per Aldeheim	Per Aldeheim	3:44
9.	"Misfit"	Desmond Child, Andreas Carlsson, Evan Taubenfield	Child, Carlsson, Harry Sommerdahl	3:27
10.	"Make It Back"	Roy, Mitch Allan, David Hodges	Allan, Hodges	3:13
11.	"Crushed"	Roy, Emanuel Kiriakou, Lindy Robbins	Kiriakou	3:46
12.	"Come to Your Senses"	Roy, Rory O'Connor	Mark Murphy	3:48
13.	"Come Back"	Roy, Hodges	Hodges, Will Hunt	3:48

iTunes - bonus track
No.	Title	Writer(s)	Length
14.	"I Don't Want to Want You"	Roy	3:35
