= Emmy (Norwegian singer) =

Norwegian singer-songwriter (born 2000)

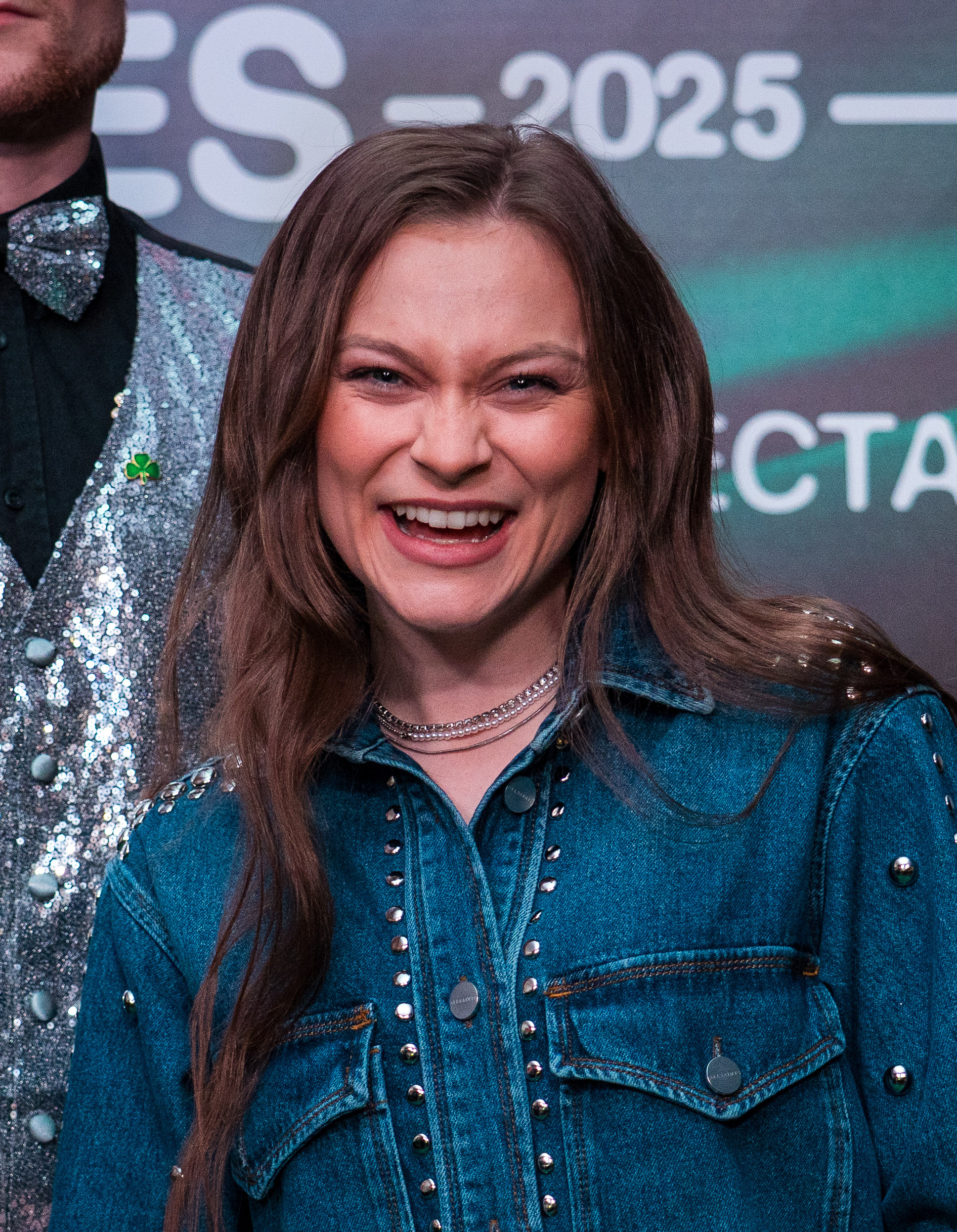
- Emmy in 2025

Background information
- Born: Emmy Kristine Guttulsrud Kristiansen; 13 September 2000 (age 26); Sande, Holmestrand, Norway
- Genres: Pop; dance music; electropop
- Occupations: Singer, songwriter
- Instrument: Vocals
- Years active: 2015–present

Emmy Kristine Guttulsrud Kristiansen (born 13 September 2000), known mononymously as Emmy, is a Norwegian singer-songwriter. She represented Ireland in the Eurovision Song Contest 2025 with the song "Laika Party".

== Biography ==
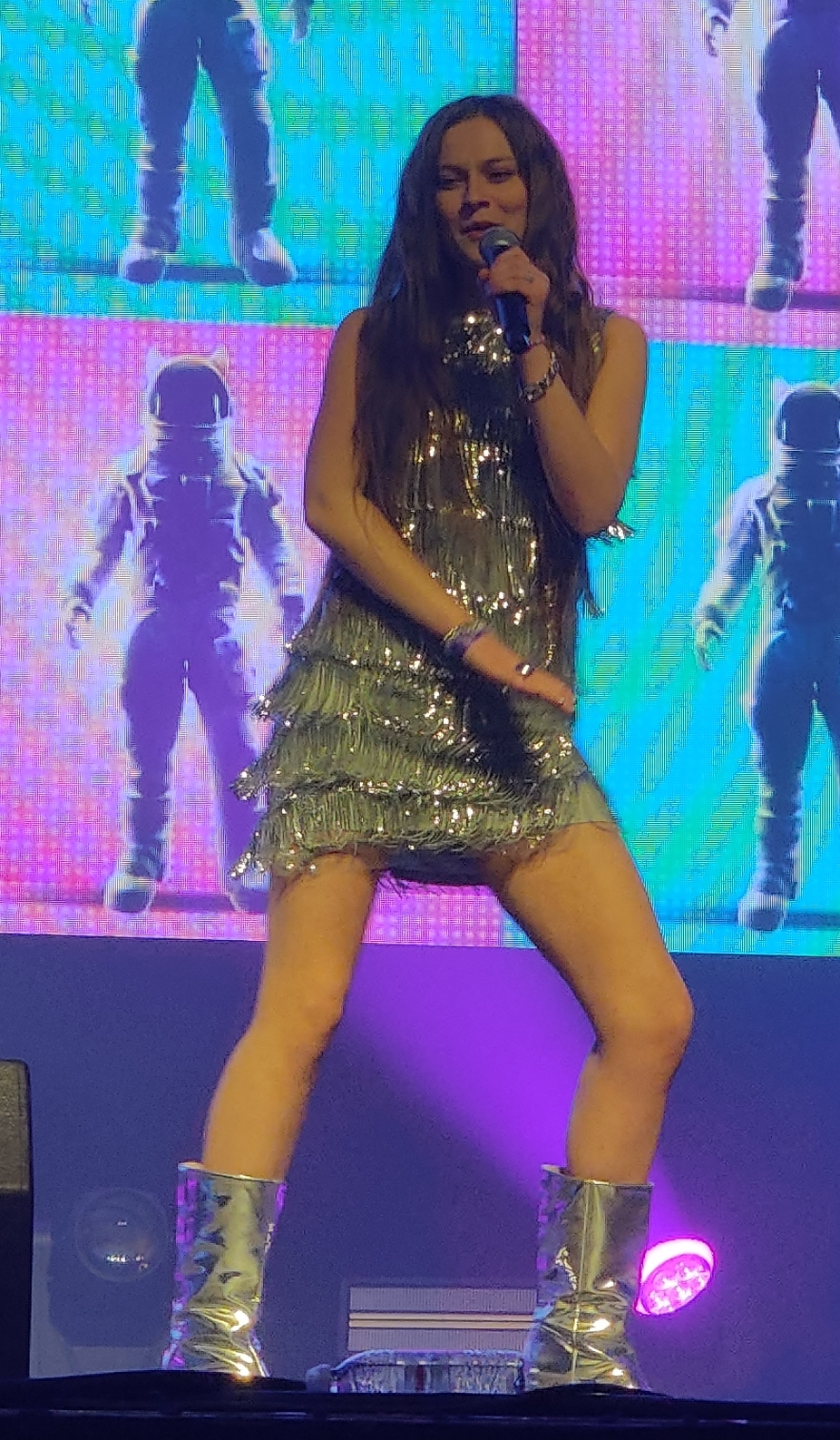
Emmy performing at the Eurovision in Concert 2025 event in Amsterdam

Kristiansen comes from the village of Sande in Holmestrand Municipality. As a child, she sang in a choir. In 2015, at the age of 14, she participated in the youth music show Melodi Grand Prix Junior with the song "Aiaiaiai"; her older brother Erlend had previously participated in the contest in 2011.

In 2021, Emmy took part in Melodi Grand Prix 2021, the Norwegian national final for the Eurovision Song Contest 2021, with her entry "Witch Woods". She qualified from the third semi-final to make the final, but did not advance to the gold final of the competition.

Emmy formed part of the Norwegian jury for the Eurovision Song Contest 2023.

Kristiansen was involved as a songwriter on the song "Woman Show" by Mathilde SPZ feat. Chris Archer and Slam Dunk, which was eliminated in the first semi-final of Melodi Grand Prix 2024. In addition to her work in Norway, she also gained an audience outside her home country through her TikTok account, where she eventually gained over a million followers.

In January 2025, Kristiansen was announced as a participant in Eurosong 2025, the Irish national final for the Eurovision Song Contest 2025 with the song "Laika Party", written by Emmy in collaboration with one Irish and three Norwegian songwriters. The song had initially been submitted to Norway with the hope of competing in Melodi Grand Prix 2025, but was not selected. At the national final, the winner was selected by a combination of a public vote, a national jury and an international jury. Emmy scored highest in the national jury and public vote and scored second highest in the international jury, earning the right to represent Ireland. Ireland was drawn to compete in the second semi-final on 15 May, performing in the first half of the show. "Laika Party" failed to qualify for the final. Kristiansen was also involved as a songwriter on the song "Ramtai" by Citi Zēni, which placed third at Supernova 2025, the Latvian national final for Eurovision that same year.

In January 2026, Emmy was selected to take part in the radio selection for Melodi Grand Prix 2026 with the song "Sykt fin" and was eliminated in the first round.

== Discography ==
=== Singles ===
- 2015: "Aiaiaiai"
- 2016: "Bjørnar"
- 2016: "Frightened of Lightning"
- 2018: "Jeg ser at du har ringt"
- 2019: "The Little Boy"
- 2019: "Er det du som har tatt den?"
- 2020: "Gunnar"
- 2020: "If Only"
- 2021: "Witch Woods"
- 2021: "Collection"
- 2021: "Brilleskille" (with Ole Hartz)
- 2021: "Some Say"
- 2022: "Venus (Why Don’t We Run)"
- 2022: "Juliet"
- 2022: "Dear Sandman"
- 2022: "Dear Santa"
- 2023: "Just a Ghost"
- 2023: "DotA" (with J.O.X)
- 2023: "She"
- 2023: "Haunting You"
- 2024: "Vil ha dig" (with Unge Lama)
- 2024: "Lose My Love"
- 2024: "Dancing All Alone"
- 2024: "Om du var min" (with J.O.X)
- 2024: "Ain’t Nobody" (with Braaten)
- 2024: "The Hanging Tree" (with Braaheim and Ilyaa)
- 2024: "Boten Anna" (with J.O.X and Hubbe)
- 2024: "Behind Blue Eyes" (with Braaheim and Ilyaa)
- 2024: "Say You Love Me" (with Braaheim and Ilyaa)
- 2024: "Lie to Me"
- 2024: "Monster"
- 2024: "Left Outside Alone"
- 2025: "Mom Is Home" (with K-391 and Nick Strand)
- 2025: "Laika Party"
- 2026: "Sykt fin"

== Awards and nominations ==
Year	Award	Category	Nominee(s)	Result	Ref.
2025	Eurovision Awards	Luscious Locks	Herself	Nominated	

Awards and achievements
Preceded by Bambie Thug with "Doomsday Blue"	Ireland in the Eurovision Song Contest; 2025	Incumbent
