= Story of My Life (Lesley Roy song) =

2020 song by Lesley Roy

Single by Lesley Roy
- Released: 13 March 2020
- Genre: Dance-pop
- Length: 3:05
- Label: Universal Denmark
- Songwriters: Lesley Roy; Robert Marvin; Catt Gravitt; Tom Shapiro

Lesley Roy singles chronology
"Free the Flame (Ember Moon)" (2016)	"Story of My Life" (2020)	"Gold" (2020)

Eurovision Song Contest 2020 entry
- Country: Ireland
- Artist: Lesley Roy
- Language: English
- Composers: Lesley Roy; Robert Marvin; Catt Gravitt; Tom Shapiro
- Lyricists: Lesley Roy; Robert Marvin; Catt Gravitt; Tom Shapiro

Finals performance
- Semi-final result: Contest cancelled

Entry chronology
- ◄ "22" (2019)
- "Maps" (2021) ►

"Story of My Life" is a song by Irish singer-songwriter Lesley Roy. The song would have represented Ireland in the Eurovision Song Contest 2020.

== Background ==
The Irish broadcaster RTÉ invited established songwriters and artists to submit songs from which they, in conjunction with 2FM, made a shortlist and chose their entry for the Eurovision Song Contest 2020.

== Eurovision Song Contest ==
The song was meant to represent Ireland in the Eurovision Song Contest 2020, after Lesley Roy was internally selected by the national broadcaster Raidió Teilifís Éireann (RTÉ). On 28 January 2020, a special allocation draw was held which placed each country into one of the two semi-finals, as well as which half of the show they would perform in. Ireland was placed into the first semi-final, to be held on 12 May 2020, and was scheduled to perform in the first half of the show. However, on March 18, 2020, the EBU announced the cancellation of Eurovision 2020 as a direct result of the Coronavirus pandemic in Europe.

== Music video ==
A music video to accompany the release of "Story of My Life" was first released onto YouTube on 5 March 2020. The music video features Roy wearing pink-colored attire. The video was directed by Kate Dolan.

== Charts ==
Chart (2020)	Peak position
Irish Homegrown Top 20 (OCC)	12
