= Ireland in the Eurovision Song Contest 2020 =

- Eurovision Song Contest 2020
- Participating broadcaster: Raidió Teilifís Éireann (RTÉ)
- Country: Ireland
- Selection process: Internal selection
- Announcement date: 5 March 2020

Competing entry
- Song: "Story of My Life"
- Artist: Lesley Roy
- Songwriters: Lesley Roy; Catt Gravitt; Robert Marvin; Tom Shapiro

Placement
- Final result: Contest cancelled

Participation chronology

Ireland was set to be represented at the Eurovision Song Contest 2020 with the song "Story of My Life", written by Lesley Roy, Catt Gravitt, Robert Marvin, and Tom Shapiro, and performed by Roy herself. The Irish participating broadcaster, Raidió Teilifís Éireann (RTÉ), internally selected its entry for the contest, which was announced on 5 March 2020. However, due to the COVID-19 pandemic in Europe, the contest was cancelled.

Ireland was drawn to compete in the first half of the first semi-final of the Eurovision Song Contest, which would have taken place on 12 May 2020.

== Background ==
Prior to the 2020 contest, Raidió Teilifís Éireann (RTÉ) and its predecessor national broadcasters have participated in the Eurovision Song Contest representing Ireland fifty-two times since RÉ's first entry in 1965. They have won the contest a record seven times in total, the most out of any country. Their first win came in 1970, with "All Kinds of Everything" performed by Dana. Ireland holds the record for being the only country to win the Eurovision Song contest three times in a row (in 1992, 1993, and 1994), as well as having the only three-time winner (Johnny Logan, who won in 1980 as a singer, 1987 as a singer-songwriter, and again in 1992 as a songwriter). Since 2013, only two Irish entries managed to qualify for the final: "Only Love Survives" by Ryan Dolan which placed 26th (last) in the final in 2013, and "Together" by Ryan O'Shaughnessy which placed 16th in the final in 2018. The Irish entry in 2019, "22" performed by Sarah McTernan, failed to qualify to the final.

As part of its duties as participating broadcaster, RTÉ organises the selection of its entry in the Eurovision Song Contest and broadcasts the event in the country. The broadcaster confirmed its intentions to participate at the 2020 contest on 16 September 2019. From 2008 to 2015, RTÉ had set up the national final Eurosong to choose both the song and performer to compete at Eurovision for Ireland, with both the public and regional jury groups involved in the selection, while RTÉ held an internal selection since 2016 to choose the artist and song. For the 2020 contest, RTÉ internally selected both the artist and song.

== Before Eurovision ==
=== Internal selection ===
RTÉ opened a submission period on 26 September 2019 where artists and composers "with a proven track record of success in the music industry" were able to submit their entries until 25 October 2019. In addition to the public submissions, RTÉ reserved the right to approach established artists and composers to submit entries and to match songs with different artists to the ones who submitted an entry.

On 31 January 2020, RTÉ announced during the RTÉ 2fm programme Breakfast with Doireann and Eoghan that they had internally selected Lesley Roy to represent Ireland in Rotterdam, performing the song "Story of My Life". "Story of My Life" was written by Roy herself together with Catt Gravitt, Robert Marvin and Tom Shapiro, and was selected by a jury panel consisting of music industry professionals appointed by RTÉ in conjunction with RTÉ 2fm. The song was released on the same day via a music video uploaded on YouTube. Roy's first live performance of the song took place on 6 April, during the RTÉ One Friday night programme The Late Late Show.

== At Eurovision ==
According to Eurovision rules, all nations with the exceptions of the host country and the "Big Five" (France, Germany, Italy, Spain and the United Kingdom) are required to qualify from one of two semi-finals in order to compete for the final; the top ten countries from each semi-final progress to the final. The European Broadcasting Union (EBU) split up the competing countries into six different pots based on voting patterns from previous contests, with countries with favourable voting histories put into the same pot. On 28 January 2020, a special allocation draw was held which placed each country into one of the two semi-finals, as well as which half of the show they would perform in. Ireland was placed into the first semi-final, to be held on 12 May 2020, and was scheduled to perform in the first half of the show. However, due to 2019-20 pandemic of Coronavirus, the contest was cancelled.

In the Eurovision Song Celebration YouTube broadcast in place of the heats, it was revealed that the song would have performed 7th, between Lithuania and Russia.
