= Maps (Lesley Roy song) =

2021 song by Lesley Roy

Single by Lesley Roy
- Released: 26 February 2021
- Genre: Pop
- Length: 2:52
- Label: Universal Denmark
- Songwriters: Philip Strand; Emelie Eriksson; Lesley Roy; Lukas Hällgren

Lesley Roy singles chronology
"Gold" (2020)	"Maps" (2021)

Music video
- "Maps" on YouTube

Eurovision Song Contest 2021 entry
- Country: Ireland
- Artist: Lesley Roy

Finals performance
- Semi-final result: 16th
- Semi-final points: 20

Entry chronology
- ◄ "Story of My Life" (2020)
- "That's Rich" (2022) ►

"Maps" is a song by Irish singer Lesley Roy. The song represented Ireland in the Eurovision Song Contest 2021 in Rotterdam, the Netherlands.

== Eurovision Song Contest ==
=== Internal selection ===
On 17 December 2020, Irish national broadcaster RTÉ confirmed that Lesley Roy would represent Ireland in the 2021 contest. The song was premiered on The RTÉ 2fm Breakfast Show on 26 February 2021.

The same day, a music video was released for the song, filmed by Ais Brady in the Wicklow Mountains. Roy performed the song live for the first time on The Late Late Show that evening.

=== At Eurovision ===
The 65th edition of the Eurovision Song Contest took place in Rotterdam, the Netherlands and consisted of two semi-finals on 18 May and 20 May 2021, and the grand final on 22 May 2021. According to the Eurovision rules, all participating countries, except the host nation and the "Big Five", consisting of France, Germany, Italy, Spain and the United Kingdom, are required to qualify from one of two semi-finals to compete for the final, although the top 10 countries from the respective semi-final progress to the grand final. On 17 November 2020, it was announced that Ireland would be performing in the first half of the first semi-final of the contest.

== Charts ==
Chart performance for "Maps"
Chart (2021)	Peak position
Ireland (IRMA)	76
Lithuania (AGATA)	96
Netherlands (Single Tip)	30
