= Lesley Roy =

Irish singer

- Born: 17 September 1986 (age 40); Dublin, Ireland
- Origin: Balbriggan, Dublin, Ireland
- Genres: Alternative rock, pop rock, pop
- Occupations: Singer, songwriter
- Years active: 2008–present
- Label: Jive Records

Lesley Roy (born 17 September 1986) is an Irish singer-songwriter from Balbriggan, County Dublin. She was signed to an independent Irish label in 2006 followed by a record deal with US label Jive Records. She released her debut album Unbeautiful in 2008, which was executive produced by Max Martin and which had a top 40 hit with the single Unbeautiful on US radio. Until switching her focus to songwriting/toplining and attracting the attention of Marc Jordan (Rebel One Publishing) the former manager credited for launching the career of Rihanna and owner of Rebel One Management & Publishing. As a songwriter Roy has experienced international success with releases for artists including Adam Lambert, Miss Montreal, Medina, Jana Kramer, Marlee Scott, Deorro, Anish Sood and Brendan Murray.

In 2019, Roy was chosen to represent Ireland in the Eurovision Song Contest 2020 with a song she wrote and produced with Robert Marvin, Catt Gravitt and Tom Shapiro. The 2020 competition was cancelled due to the COVID-19 pandemic, however Roy had a top 20 hit in Ireland reaching number 12 in the homegrown charts. Roy was subsequently chosen again to represent Ireland in the 2021 contest, with a different song, titled "Maps" which charted at number 3 in the Irish home grown chart.

== Career ==
=== 2008–2009: Unbeautiful ===
Jive Records A&R Jeff Fenster noticed Roy's work at HitQuarters, and agreed to jointly finance Roy's first album project. The debut album, titled Unbeautiful, was released on 30 September 2008. According to Soundscan Unbeautiful sold 45,000 albums and 350,000 digital downloads. The album peaked on Billboard's Top Heatseekers chart at No. 5. The singer's first single "I'm Gone, I'm Going" was the 48th most played song on Hot AC radio stations for the week ending 24 June 2008, then charted at No. 36 on Billboard's Hot Adult Top 40 Tracks and No. 61 on Billboard's Pop 100 Airplay chart. "I'm Gone, I'm Going" was the theme tune for MTV's show Exiled, and was featured on an episode of The Hills. Roy appeared on FNMTV on 18 July 2008, to release the track's video. "I'm Gone, I'm Going" was highlighted as a downloadable track in Rock Band 2. Her second single was "Unbeautiful", the title track from the album. It peaked on Billboard's Pop 100 Airplay chart at No. 39 and was also featured on an episode of The Hills. "Thinking Out Loud" was also featured on an episode of The Hills. The song "Slow Goodbye" was co-written by Katy Perry. Other songwriters who collaborated on Unbeautiful with Roy include Max Martin, Dr. Luke, Rami Yacoub, Savan Kotecha, Desmond Child, Dave Hodges, Emanuel Kiriakou, Kara DioGuardi, Greg Wells, Mitch Allen and Andreas Carlsson. Also notable is that Unbeautiful was mixed by Chris Lord-Alge. In early 2009, Roy provided tour support on a 32-city tour for American Idol runner-up and hit recording artist David Archuleta. In late 2009, Roy paid tribute to her Irish roots by recording a cover of U2's "Where the Streets Have No Names" for a video montage featured in the New York City Marathon airing worldwide.

=== 2010–2019: Songwriting ===
Under the management of Benjamin Tischker at Wide Eyed Entertainment, Roy signed to Marc Jordan's Rebel One Publishing then placed three songs with Wal-Mart's debut artist, Ashlyne Huff, for her album, Let It Out, released on 7 June 2011. While working on Huff's album, Roy teamed up with some of the industry's biggest talents including, The Writing Camp, Eric Bellinger and Jerrod Bettis. On 13 April 2012, Dutch singer-songwriter, Miss Montreal, released I Am Hunter which Roy co-wrote three songs including the title track and single, "I Am Hunter", that reached No. 28 on the Dutch Top 40 chart. Roy also co-wrote the proceeding single "Better When It Hurts" and "Everything". On 15 May 2012, American singer, Adam Lambert released Trespassing, his second studio album, which debuted at number one on the US Billboard 200 chart, marking Roy's first co-write on a No. 1 album for the track "Pop That Lock" included on Trespassing. Roy collaborated with Danish production team, DEEKAY, Tim McEwan and Johannes Jørgensen on "Waiting for Love" for Danish singer Medina's album Forever, released on 1 June 2012, in Europe through EMI. Also in June 2012, Roy released two country music co-writes. "Goodbye California" with American actress of One Tree Hill and country music singer, Jana Kramer, for her self-titled debut album. Then joining back up with Desmond Child to co-write, "Rhinestone in the Rough" for Canadian country singer-songwriter Marlee Scott's album Beautiful Maybe. In 2016, Roy provided the lead vocals for the entrance theme of wrestler Ember Moon in collaboration with CFO$ for the song "Free the Flame".

=== 2020–2021: Eurovision Song Contest ===
On 5 March 2020, it was announced by RTE that Roy had been chosen to represent Ireland in the Eurovision Song Contest 2020 with the song "Story of My Life". She would have performed in the first semi-final on 12 May 2020, however on 18 March 2020, the event was cancelled due to the ongoing COVID-19 outbreak. On 17 December 2020, it was announced that Roy would instead represent Ireland at the 2021 event with a new song. Her 2021 entry, "Maps", was announced on 19 February 2021. She participated in the first semi-final on 18 May, but failed to qualify for the final. It was subsequently announced that Roy finished in last place in the first semi-final, with 20 points.

== Personal life ==
Roy is a lesbian and has been married to her American wife since 2010.

== Discography ==
=== Albums ===
Title	Details	Peak chart positions
Title	Details	US Heat.
Unbeautiful	Released: 30 September 2008; Label: Jive; Format: CD	5

=== Singles ===
==== As lead artist ====
Single	Year	Peak chart positions					Album
Single	Year	IRE	US Bub.	US Pop	US Main.	US AC	Album
"I'm Gone, I'm Going"	2008	—	—	85	—	48	Unbeautiful
"Unbeautiful"	2008	—	14	53	31	—	Unbeautiful
"Hang On"	2016	—	—	—	—	—	Non-album singles
"Blood on Your Hands"	2016	—	—	—	—	—	Non-album singles
"Free the Flame (Ember Moon)"	2016	—	—	—	—	—	Non-album singles
"Story of My Life"	2020	—	—	—	—	—	Non-album singles
"Gold"	2020	—	—	—	—	—	Non-album singles
"Maps"	2021	76	—	—	—	—	Non-album singles
"I'll Be Fine"	2021	—	—	—	—	—	Non-album singles
"—" denotes a recording that did not chart or was not released.

==== As featured artist ====
Single	Year	Album or EP
"Tell Me Lies" (Deorro featuring Lesley Roy)	2017	Good Evening

== Songwriting discography ==
Year	Artist	Album	Song	Co-written with
2011	Ashlyne Huff	"Let It Out"	"Let It Out"	Ashlyne Huff, Jerrod Bettis, Shari Short, Noel Zancanella
2011			"Own the Night"	Eric Bellinger, Evan "Kidd" Bogart, Gregory Ogan
2011			"Runaway"	David "DQ" Quiñones, Evan "Kidd" Bogart, Ramon Reo Owen
2012	Adam Lambert	Trespassing	"Pop That Lock"	Adam Lambert, Robert Marvin, Josh Crosby, Nate Campany
2012	Miss Montreal		"I am Hunter"	Nate Campany, Sanne Hans
2012			"Better When It Hurts"	Sanne Hans
2012		I Am Hunter	"Everything"	Nate Campany, Josh Crosby Sanne Hans
2012	Medina	Forever	"Waiting for Love"	Tim McEwan & Johannes Jørgensen
2012	Jana Kramer	Jana Kramer	"Goodbye California"	Jana Kramer, Josh Crosby and Catt Gravitt
2012	Marlee Scott	Beautiful Maybe	"Rhinestone in the Rough"	Desmond Child & Barry Dean

Awards and achievements
Preceded by Sarah McTernan with "22"	Ireland in the Eurovision Song Contest; 2020	Succeeded by Herself with "Maps"
Preceded by Herself with "Story of My Life"	Ireland in the Eurovision Song Contest; 2021	Succeeded by Brooke Scullion with "That's Rich"
