= Laika Party =

2025 single by Emmy

Single by Emmy
- Released: 20 January 2025
- Genre: Eurodance; dance-pop
- Length: 3:00
- Label: ADA Nordic
- Songwriters: Emmy Kristine Guttulsrud Kristiansen; Erlend Guttulsrud Kristiansen; Larissa Tormey; Truls Marius Aarra; Henrik Østlund
- Producers: Henrik Østlund; Jonas Jensen

Emmy singles chronology
"Mom Is Home" (2025)	"Laika Party" (2025)

Music video
- "Laika Party" on YouTube

Eurovision Song Contest 2025 entry
- Country: Ireland
- Artist: Emmy
- Language: English
- Composers: Emmy Kristine Guttulsrud Kristiansen; Erlend Guttulsrud Kristiansen; Henrik Østlund; Larissa Tormey; Truls Marius Aarra
- Lyricists: Emmy Kristine Guttulsrud Kristiansen; Erlend Guttulsrud Kristiansen; Henrik Østlund; Larissa Tormey; Truls Marius Aarra

Finals performance
- Semi-final result: 13th
- Semi-final points: 28

Entry chronology
- ◄ "Doomsday Blue" (2024)

Official performance video
- "Laika Party" (Second Semi-Final) on YouTube

"Laika Party" is a song by Norwegian singer and songwriter Emmy. It was written by Emmy alongside four other songwriters and produced by Henrik Østlund and Jonas Jensen. The song was released on 20 January 2025 through ADA Nordic. "Laika Party" represented Ireland in the Eurovision Song Contest 2025, where it failed to qualify to the grand final after placing 13th in the second semi-final with 28 points.

The song is described by Emmy as a story that creates an alternate reality for Soviet dog Laika, where she survived in space instead of dying on the Sputnik 2 spacecraft. It received mixed critical reception from both Irish and international media, receiving some praise for its musical composition but also receiving criticism for a lack of uniqueness compared to other Eurovision songs.

== Background and release ==
"Laika Party" was written and composed by Emmy Kristine Guttulsrud Kristiansen, Erlend Guttulsrud Kristiansen, Larissa Tormey, Truls Marius Aarra, and Henrik Østlund. The song's subject is based on Laika, a Soviet dog who died while in low Earth orbit upon the Sputnik 2 spacecraft on 3 November 1957. Speaking with The Irish Times, Emmy stated that she first learned of Laika's story after reading a quiz question in a newspaper, writing the song in a Norwegian songwriting camp.

In multiple interviews, Emmy stated that as an "animal lover", she was sad after learning how Laika died and wanted to create a happier alternate reality for Laika where she never died, instead spending her eternal time in space partying. In an analysis by Wiwibloggs' Tom Hendryk, the song also references the fear of loneliness and being put in bad situations with no choice, advocating for perseverance through tough times.

=== Music video and promotion ===
Along with the song's release, an accompanying music video was released on 12 March 2025. The video was filmed and produced over the course of two weeks in Emmy's native Norway. To further promote the song, Emmy participated in various Eurovision pre-parties before the contest throughout the months of March and April 2025, including Melfest WKND on 7 March, Eurovision in Concert on 5 April, the London Eurovision Party on 13 April, and Pre-Party ES on 19 April. On 7 May, Emmy premiered a video of her performing "Laika Party" at Trinity College Dublin on The Late Late Show.

== Critical reception ==
=== Irish media and personalities ===
"Laika Party" received mixed critical reception. The Irish Times' Laura Slattery stated that the song "has lots of wonderful things going for it", describing the song as a "more arch melancholic bop than sad banger". The Irish Examiner's Tom Dunne described "Laika Party" as a "martyr song". He further criticised the Irish Eurovision delegation for "outsourc[ing] our Eurovision entry to Norway", stating that while an Irish dog could have been chosen for the song's subject, "the glamour of space trumps mythology every time." Television presenter Donal Skehan stated in the Irish Independent that while the song had "really great production", the song was not memorable to him. In comparing the song to 2024 Irish entrant Bambie Thug's "Doomsday Blue", he stated that Bambie "was far more memorable in terms of just that shock on screen."

=== Eurovision-related and international media ===
In a Wiwibloggs review containing several reviews from several critics, the song was rated 5.73 out of 10 points, earning 26th out of the 37 songs competing in that year's Eurovision in the site's annual ranking that year. Vulture's Jon O'Brien ranked the song 19th out of 37, writing that the song was a "surprisingly touching tribute" to Laika but added that it was a "jaunty, nonsensical ditty not a million miles away from fellow Scandinavians Aqua". ESC Beat's Doron Lahav ranked the song 23rd out of 37, stating that while it was "catchy and danceable", he criticised the lack of change of musical composition within the song.

The BBC's Mark Savage described the song as a "trance-pop anthem" that "despite a peppy performance, it's a bit of a downer". The Guardian's Angelica Frey included the song in her top ten best Eurovision 2025 songs list, describing it as a "delightful synthesis of Aqua, Grimes and a hint of Mario Kart’s Rainbow Road". Eurovision Stars' Jon Lewak wrote that the song was "very catchy"; however, he added that the qualification of the song from the Eurovision semi-final heavily depended on the song's staging.

== Eurovision Song Contest 2025 ==
=== Eurosong 2025 ===
Ireland's national broadcaster Raidió Teilifís Éireann (RTÉ) broadcast a Eurosong 2025 special episode of The Late Late Show on 7 February 2025, to select the Irish entrant for the Eurovision Song Contest 2025. This edition was the ninth iteration of the contest. The winning song out of six entries was selected via a combination of international jury, national jury, and public voting, with each group having a third of the total vote.

Initially, Emmy submitted Laika Party to Melodi Grand Prix 2025, the Norwegian competition to select Norway's representative for Eurovision 2025. However, she was rejected by NRK. She later applied to Eurosong 2025, where she was announced as a participant on 23 January 2025. According to RTÉ, Emmy was allowed to participate as one of the songwriters, Larissa Tormey, was Irish. She was drawn to perform in the sixth and final position. In the final, she finished second in the international jury vote, scoring 10 points. However, she was able to win both the televote and the national jury votes, securing two sets of 12 points, combining for a total of 34 points. The total was eight more than runner-up Samantha Mumba's "My Way". As a result, the song won the right to perform as the Irish entrant for the Eurovision Song Contest 2025.

=== At Eurovision ===
The Eurovision Song Contest 2025 took place at the St. Jakobshalle in Basel, Switzerland, and consisted of two semi-finals held on the respective dates of 13 and 15 May and the final on 17 May 2025. During the allocation draw on 28 January 2025, Ireland was drawn to compete in the second semi-final, performing in the first half of the show. Emmy was later drawn to perform third in the semi-final, behind Montenegro's Nina Žižić and ahead of Latvia's Tautumeitas.

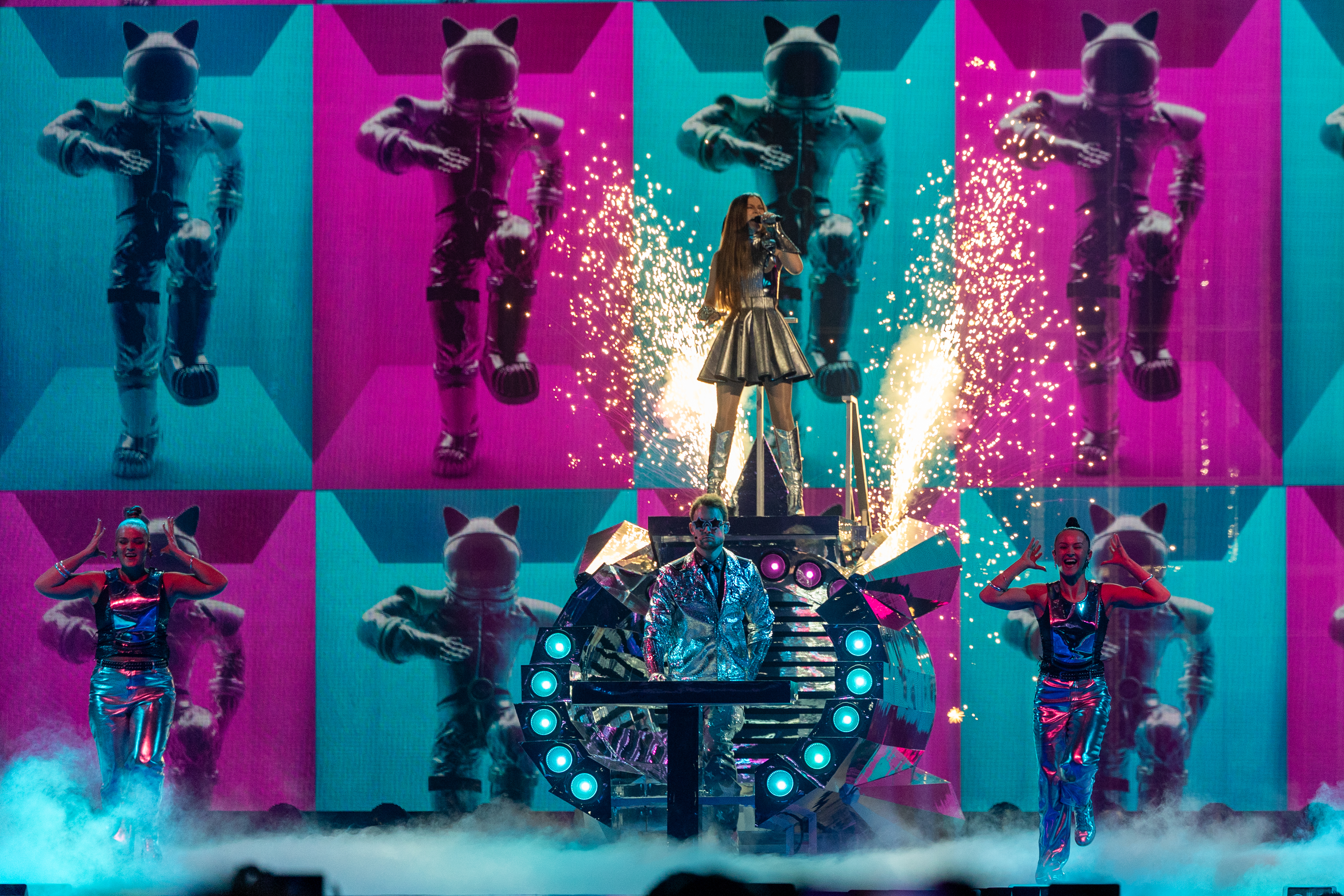
Emmy performing "Laika Party" at a Eurovision 2025 dress rehearsal before the second semi-final.

For its Eurovision performance, Marvin Dietmann was appointed as the staging director. The performance featured Emmy alongside her brother Erland and four other female background dancers: Vilde Skorstad, Karin Aaeng Stuge, Kristiane Lindvik, and Christiane Bergersen. All six performers wear silver clothing, with Emmy herself wearing a "pleated skirt, silver boots, and a helmet-like hood" according to ESC Beat writer Doron Lahav. In the background, LED visuals of neon-coloured marching dogs, a star constellation that forms the shape of Laika, and neon planets all show during the performance.

Emmy failed to qualify for the grand final, finishing in 13th out of 16 songs in the semi-final with 28 points. The highest set of televoting points she earned in the semi-final was a set of seven points from the United Kingdom. The result was the eighth non-qualification for Ireland in the last decade. In response to her non-qualification, she stated to the Irish Independent that "there are so many emotions... Of course I am a bit sad if I have disappointed Ireland. But at the same time they have been so nice and supportive and we have received so many beautiful messages." She later posted on Instagram that she was "so sorry" to Ireland at not qualifying.

== Charts ==
Chart performance for "Laika Party"
Chart (2025)	Peak position
Ireland (IRMA)	49
Lithuania (AGATA)	77
UK Singles Downloads (OCC)	87
UK Singles Sales (OCC)	91

== Release history ==
Release history and formats for "Laika Party"
Region	Date	Format(s)	Label	Ref.
Various	10 March 2025	Digital download; streaming	Warner; Manifester	
