= Brendan Balfe =

Irish radio personality

Brendan Balfe (born 19 September 1945 in Dublin) is an Irish radio personality, who was on-air consistently for more than 40 years on RTÉ. He retired in 2010. Comedy has been a feature of many of Balfe's programmes. He has won three International Awards for radio comedy and his "Pathetic News" feature on Balfe Street, was the only original satire on Irish radio for many years. He set an international Radio record (now broken) for a 12-hour broadcast as the story of the assassination of Robert F. Kennedy was unfolding.

Balfe served as the Irish spokesperson for the Eurovision Song Contest between 1974 and 1977 as well as in 1987. He also provided the RTÉ radio commentary for the 1983 Contest and provided the RTÉ television commentary for the 1986 Contest.

In 1986, Balfe won a Jacob's Award for his radio documentary series The Spice of Life.

From 1999 to 2010, Balfe was the Music Policy Co-ordinator for RTÉ Radio 1, responsible for the choice of contemporary music across the schedule and was the first ever voice on RTÉ 2fm.

He published his autobiography, entitled Radio Man, in 2007.

On 24 March 2008 Balfe hosted the last radio show to be broadcast on RTÉ's medium wave service, Medium Wave Goodbye, a personal selection of items broadcast on the service since 1926.

Balfe retired from RTÉ in September 2010, following the final episode of his 11-part radio documentary series, The Irish Voice.
