= Johnny Logan discography =

- Studio albums: 16
- Compilation albums: 10
- Singles: 63

This is the discography of 2 time Eurovision Song Contest winner and Irish singer Johnny Logan.

== Albums ==
=== Studio albums ===
Title	Album details	Peak chart positions							
Title	Album details	AUS	DEN	GER	NL	NOR	SWE	SWI	UK
In London	Released: 1979; Label: Release, Piccadilly; Formats: LP	—	—	—	—	—	—	—	—
What's Another Year	Released: May 1980; Label: Release; Formats: LP, MC; Also released as The Johnny Logan Album	—	—	—	27	39	—	—	—
Straight from the Heart	Released: December 1985; Label: Epic; Formats: LP	—	—	—	—	—	—	—	—
Hold Me Now	Released: July 1987; Label: Epic; Formats: CD, LP, MC	49	—	18	59	12	23	25	83
Mention My Name	Released: 1989; Label: Epic, CBS; Formats: CD, LP, MC	—	—	—	—	—	—	—	—
Endless Emotion	Released: 27 March 1992; Label: WEA; Formats: CD, LP, MC	—	—	—	—	—	—	—	—
Reach Out	Released: 23 September 1996; Label: MSM Music; Formats: CD	—	—	—	—	—	—	—	—
Love is All	Released: 4 October 1999; Label: White; Formats: CD	—	—	—	—	—	—	—	—
Reach for Me	Released: 30 March 2001; Label: Epic/Sony, BMG; Formats: CD	—	2	—	—	13	12	—	—
Save This Christmas for Me	Released: 28 November 2001; Label: Epic/Sony; Formats: CD	—	25	—	—	—	—	—	—
We All Need Love	Released: October 2003; Label: Scanbox Entertainment; Formats: CD	—	20	—	—	36	39	—	—
The Irish Connection (Johnny Logan and Friends)	Released: April 2007; Label: TELAMO; Formats: CD, digital download	—	3	71	—	1	1	72	—
Irishman in America	Released: September 2008; Label: My Way Music; Formats: CD, digital download	—	10	—	—	20	24	—	—
Nature of Love	Released: 7 May 2010; Label: Black Pelican; Formats: CD, digital download	—	9	—	—	19	6	—	—
The Irish Connection 2	Released: December 2012; Label: Labrador Music; Formats: CD, digital download	—	17	—	—	32	—	—	—
It Is What It Is	Released: 5 May 2017; Label: Universal Music Group; Formats: CD, digital download	—	—	—	—	—	—	—	—
"—" denotes releases that did not chart or were not released in that territory.

=== Compilation albums ===
Title	Album details
Love Songs	Released: 1990; Label: K-tel; Formats: LP, MC
Living for Loving	Released: 28 February 1994; Label: Plaza; Formats: CD
The Best of Johnny Logan	Released: 6 May 1996; Label: Epic; Formats: CD
I'm No Hero	Released: 1 November 1996; Label: Compass; Formats: CD
What's Another Year	Released: 1998; Label: Sony Music; Formats: CD
The Best of Johnny Logan	Released: 2004; Label: Sony Music; Formats: CD, LP, MC
Glanz Lichter	Released: 6 May 2011; Label: Koch Universal; Formats: CD
Balladen	Released: 15 July 2011; Label: DA Music; Formats: CD
What's Another Year – Best Of	Released: 26 August 2016; Label: TELAMO; Formats: CD, digital download
Irish Soul – Die schönsten Lieder aus Irland	Released: 18 May 2018; Label: TELAMO; Formats: 2xCD

== Singles ==
Title	Year	Peak chart positions										Album
Title	Year	IRE	AUS	BEL (FL)	DEN	GER	NL	NOR	SWE	SWI	UK	Album
"No, I Don't Want to Fall in Love"	1978	—	—	—	—	—	—	—	—	—	—	What's Another Year / In London
"Living for Loving"	1978	—	—	—	—	—	—	—	—	—	—	What's Another Year / In London
"Angelina"	1979	—	—	—	—	—	—	—	—	—	—	What's Another Year / In London
"What's Another Year"	1980	1	—	1	1	2	6	1	1	2	1	What's Another Year / The Johnny Logan Album
"In London"	1980	—	—	29	—	70	—	—	—	—	—	In London
"Save Me"	1980	—	—	—	—	—	—	—	—	—	—	The Johnny Logan Album
"Give a Little Bit More (Too Much Too Soon)"	1980	25	—	—	—	—	—	—	—	—	—	The Johnny Logan Album
"Louisiana Rain" (Germany-only release)	1981	—	—	—	—	—	—	—	—	—	—	The Johnny Logan Album
"Ich lieb dich so wie du bist" (Germany-only release)	1981	—	—	—	—	—	—	—	—	—	—	Non-album singles
"Oriental Eyes"	1982	18	—	—	—	—	—	—	—	—	—	Non-album singles
"Becoming Electric"	1982	22	—	—	—	—	—	—	—	—	—	Non-album singles
"Standing There"	1983	—	—	—	—	—	—	—	—	—	—	Non-album singles
"Heaven"	1984	20	—	—	—	—	—	—	—	—	—	Non-album singles
"Ginny Come Lately"	1985	—	—	—	—	—	—	—	—	—	—	Straight from the Heart
"Stab in the Back"	1986	—	—	—	—	—	—	—	—	—	—	Non-album single
"Hold Me Now"	1987	1	4	1	4	2	3	2	2	6	2	Hold Me Now
"I'm Not in Love"	1987	8	75	6	—	47	70	—	—	—	51	Hold Me Now
"Heartland"	1988	21	—	—	—	—	—	—	—	—	—	Hold Me Now
"Lonely Lovers"	1988	—	—	—	—	—	—	—	—	—	—	Non-album single
"Red Lips" (Europe-only release)	1989	—	—	—	—	—	—	—	—	—	—	Mention My Name
"All I Ever Wanted"	1989	—	—	—	—	—	—	—	—	—	—	Mention My Name
"Lay Down Your Heart"	1989	20	—	—	—	—	—	—	—	—	—	Mention My Name
"Miss You Nights" (featuring the Jordinaires)	1991	—	—	—	—	—	—	—	—	—	—	Love Songs
"How 'Bout Us" (Germany-only release)	1991	—	—	—	—	70	—	—	—	—	—	Endless Emotion
"It's Only Tears" (Germany-only release)	1992	—	—	—	—	82	—	—	—	—	—	Endless Emotion
"Long Lie the Rivers" (Germany-only release)	1992	—	—	—	—	—	—	—	—	—	—	Endless Emotion
"Voices (Are Calling)" (Germany-only release)	1993	—	—	—	—	—	—	—	—	—	—	Non-album singles
"Celebrate and Win" (Germany-only release)	1993	—	—	—	—	—	—	—	—	—	—	Non-album singles
"I'm No Hero" (Germany-only release)	1993	—	—	—	—	—	—	—	—	—	—	Endless Emotion
"White Magic" (Germany-only release)	1994	—	—	—	—	—	—	—	—	—	—	White Magic (soundtrack)
"Another Lover" (Germany-only release)	1995	—	—	—	—	—	—	—	—	—	—	Reach Out
"The Only Thing I've Ever Wanted" (Germany-only release)	1996	—	—	—	—	—	—	—	—	—	—	Reach Out
"The Love in Your Eyes" (Germany-only release)	1996	—	—	—	—	—	—	—	—	—	—	Reach Out
"Reunited" (featuring Dara Rolins; Germany-only release)	1996	—	—	—	—	—	—	—	—	—	—	Reach Out
"Reach Out" (Netherlands-only release)	1996	—	—	—	—	—	—	—	—	—	—	Reach Out
"Vision of Glory" (with Montserrat Caballé; Europe-only release)	1997	—	—	—	—	—	—	—	—	—	—	Non-album singles
"Love to Live" (Germany-only release)	1997	—	—	—	—	—	—	—	—	—	—	Non-album singles
"You've Really Got a Hold on Me" (with Wendy Van Wanten; Belgium-only release)	1998	—	—	—	—	—	—	—	—	—	—	Denk dan mij (Wendy Van Wanten album)
"Silly Love Songs" (Europe-only release)	1999	—	—	—	—	—	—	—	—	—	—	Love Is All
"When Love Was All" (Europe-only release)	1999	—	—	—	—	—	—	—	—	—	—	Love Is All
"If You Believe" (Austria-only release)	1999	—	—	—	—	—	—	—	—	—	—	Non-album single
"The Lucky One" (Europe-only release)	2000	—	—	—	—	—	—	—	—	—	—	Love Is All
"The Great Divide" (Europe-only release)	2000	—	—	—	—	—	—	—	—	—	—	Love Is All
"Music" (with Robert Wells; Europe-only release)	2000	—	—	—	—	—	—	—	—	—	—	Non-album single
"Hold Me Now 2001" (Europe-only release)	2001	—	—	—	9	—	—	—	54	—	—	Reach for Me
"No One Makes Love Like You" (with Nicole; Germany-only release)	2001	—	—	—	—	—	—	—	—	—	—	Reach for Me
"Let's Make Love" (featuring Natasja Crone Back; Denmark-only release)	2001	—	—	—	—	—	—	—	—	—	—	Reach for Me
"Taking All the Blame" (Europe-only release)	2001	—	—	—	—	—	—	—	—	—	—	Reach for Me
"Let Love Be Love" (featuring Friends; Denmark-only release)	2001	—	—	—	—	—	—	—	—	—	—	Save This Christmas for Me
"Christmas Time" (Europe-only release)	2001	—	—	—	—	—	—	—	—	—	—	Save This Christmas for Me
"You've Lost That Lovin' Feelin'" (with André Hazes; Netherlands-only release)	2002	—	—	—	—	—	54	—	—	—	—	Non-album single
"We All Need Love" (Germany-only release)	2004	—	—	—	—	85	—	—	—	—	—	We All Need Love
"Don't Cry / I Love to Party" (with Kaye Styles)	2006	25	—	7	—	—	—	—	—	—	—	Non-album singles
"A State of Happiness" (Netherlands-only release)	2006	—	—	—	—	—	—	—	—	—	—	Non-album singles
"Dancing with My Father"	2009	—	—	—	—	—	—	—	—	—	—	Irishman in America
"Prayin'"	2013	3	—	—	—	—	—	—	—	—	—	Non-album singles
"The Way She Looks At You" (solo or with Olaf Berger; Germany-only release)	2015	—	—	—	—	—	—	—	—	—	—	Non-album singles
"It Is What It Is"	2017	—	—	—	—	—	—	—	—	—	—	It Is What It Is
"Little Drummer Boy"	2019	—	—	—	—	—	—	—	—	—	—	Non-album singles
"We Are Invincible"	2020	—	—	—	—	—	—	—	—	—	—	Non-album singles
"Merry Christmas to the World"	2020	—	—	—	—	—	—	—	—	—	—	Non-album singles
"Just One Look" (with Jannike)	2021	—	—	—	—	—	—	—	—	—	—	Non-album singles
"Driving Home for Christmas" (with the Irish Chamber Orchestra)	2021	—	—	—	—	—	—	—	—	—	—	Non-album singles
"Never Walk Alone" (with Andrea Berg)	2022	—	—	—	—	—	—	—	—	—	—	Non-album singles
"Heaven's closed"	2023	—	—	—	—	—	—	—	—	—	—	Non-album singles
"Somebody Like You"	2024	—	—	—	—	—	—	—	—	—	—	Non-album singles
"Have I Told You Lately" (with Charlotte Perrelli featuring Åsa Jinder)	2025	—	—	—	—	—	—	—	—	—	—	Non-album singles
"The Sunny Side of Christmas"	2025	—	—	—	—	—	—	—	—	—	—	Non-album singles
"Hard Rock Hallelujah" (with Lordi)	2026	—	—	—	—	—	—	—	—	—	—	Non-album singles
"The Sunny Side of Winter"	2026	—	—	—	—	—	—	—	—	—	—	Non-album singles
"—" denotes releases that did not chart or were not released in that territory.
