= In London =

In London may refer to:

- B.B. King in London, 1971
- In London (Ravi Shankar album), 1964
- In London (Johnny Logan album), 1979
  - "In London (song)", a 1978 song by Johnny Logan from the In London album
- In London (Dewey Redman album), 1996
- In London (Yilin Zhong novel), 2018
