= Trevor Knight (disambiguation) =

Trevor Knight may refer to:

- Trevor Knight (born 1993), American football player
- Trevor Knight (Canadian football) (born 1995), American player of Canadian football
- Trevor Knight (singer), Australian musician
- Trevor Knight (Irish musician) (born 1954), Irish musician
