= The Irish Connection =

The Irish Connection may refer to

== Albums ==
- The Irish Connection (Johnny Logan album) (2007)
  - The Irish Connection 2, the second Irish Connection album by Johnny Logan (2013)
- The Irish Connection (Brian McFadden album) (2013)

== See also ==
- List of Ireland-related topics
