= Hold Me Now =

Hold Me Now may refer to:

- "Hold Me Now" (Thompson Twins song)
- "Hold Me Now" (Johnny Logan song), winner of the 1987 Eurovision Song Contest
- Hold Me Now (album), a 1987 album by Johnny Logan
- "Hold Me Now", a song by The Adventures from The Sea of Love
- "Hold Me Now", a song by Elastica from Elastica
- "Hold Me Now", a song by The Polyphonic Spree from Together We're Heavy
- "Hold Me Now", a song by Red from Release the Panic
- "Hold Me Now" (Renee Olstead song)
- "Hold Me Now", a 1998 song by Come Inside
- Chicago's 1982 song "Hard to Say I'm Sorry" is sometimes referred to as "Hold Me Now" after the first line of the chorus
