= The Woods Band =

Irish folk-rock band

- Origin: Ireland
- Genre: British folk rock
- Years active: 1970–1974, 2001–2003
- Labels: Greenwich Gramophone Company (division of Decca); Market Square
- Spinoffs: Gay and Terry Woods
- Spinoff of: Steeleye Span
- Past members: Terry Woods; Gay Woods; Ed Deane; Pat Nash; Dave Browne; David "Sparky" Hughes; Paul Harrigan; Shane Martin; Steve Browne

The Woods Band was an Irish folk-rock band formed in 1970 by husband and wife team Gay & Terry Woods, shortly after their departure from Steeleye Span, before evolving into Gay & Terry Woods. In 2001, Terry Woods formed a new band and named it The Woods Band, which performed and recorded through 2003.

== History ==
The Woods Band was formed in 1970 by ex-Steeleye Span members Terry and Gay Woods. The band was formed just a few months after the couple had left Steeleye Span, shortly after the release of Steeleye's first album Hark! The Village Wait, after personal disagreements with members.

Performing under the name "Gay & Terry Woods" as well as "The Woods Band", they worked with a number of different musicians, including fiddler Joe O'Donnell. and King Crimson members Ian MacDonald and Mike Giles, amongst others. Eventually, a line-up solidified under the name The Woods Band with guitarist Ed Deane and drummer Pat Nash. Terry Woods also wanted to recruit uilleann piper Paddy Keenan, who declined and would go on to join the Bothy Band.

They began to rehearse and perform soon after forming, releasing a self-titled album in December 1971. The record was a mix of traditional material and originals, including a re-recording of the track Dreams from Terry's old band Sweeney's Men. With standard rock instruments embellished by mandola, concertina, autoharp, dulcimer, bodhran, and harpsichord, the music sounded rather similar to, and held its own with, Steeleye Span's own early work, although showing a greater rock influence.

In the spring of 1971, shortly after the album's release, Gay & Terry joined Dr. Strangely Strange for a six-week tour, bringing an end to the steady lineup of the band. They returned to working as both The Woods Band and Gay & Terry Woods, again with a changing cast of musicians. Their record label, Greenwich Gramophone Company went out of business leaving their album out of print. The Ireland division of Polydor gave the band a single release in 1974, the A and B sides were both penned by Gay and Terry but the single failed to chart. Subsequent releases by the couple were credited to Gay & Terry Woods.

== Reformation ==
In 2001, Terry Woods put together a new band, using The Woods Band as name. Despite the shared name, the only member of any version of the original band was Woods himself. Like the original band, this line-up featured a mix of traditional folk instruments with contemporary rock instruments, as well as a mix of traditional and original songs. The bulk of the lead vocals were handled by singer Shane Martin, with Dubliners singer Ronnie Drew guesting on a recording of "The Dublin Jack of All Trades". Gigging occasionally, the group put out a single studio album, Music From The Four Corners of Hell, in 2002, before becoming inactive in 2003. Woods has described the band as "parked... with the wheels off and the engine out."

== Discography ==
=== The Woods Band (1971) ===
Side One:

1. "Everytime" (T. Woods)
2. "Noisey Johnny" (T. Woods)
3. "January's Snows" (Trad.)
4. "Lament & Jig" (Inc. "Valencia Lament" & "Apples In Winter") (Trad.)

Side Two:

1. "Dreams" (T. Woods)
2. "As I Roved Out" (Trad.)
3. "Promises" (T. & G. Woods)
4. "Over The Bar" (Inc. "The Road To Athy") (T. & G. Woods, E. Deane)
- Gay Woods – Vocals, Concertina, Autoharp, Dulcimer, Bodhrán
- Terry Woods – Vocals, Mandola, Concertina, Acoustic Guitar, Electric Guitar, Bass Guitar
- Pat Nash – Drums, Vocals
- Ed Deane – Acoustic Guitar, Electric Guitar, Bass Guitar, Slide Guitar, Harpsichord

with:

- Tony Reeves – Bass Guitar on "Everytime"
- John Ryan – Piano on "Everytime", "Noisey Johnny", "Promises"; Organ on "Lament & Jig", "As I Roved Out"
- Austin Corcoran – Acoustic guitar on "Dreams", Bass Guitar on "As I Roved Out", "Promises"

Producer: Tony Reeves

=== "The Time Is Right" (1974) ===
- A-Side: "The Time Is Right" (T. & G. Woods)
- B-Side: "The Hymn" (T. & G. Woods)

Single released on Polydor, both songs later re-recorded on albums by Gay & Terry Woods.

=== Music From The Four Corners of Hell (2002) ===
1. "As I Roved Out"
2. "The Spanish Lady"
3. "Love on Tillery" (Stacey/Woods)
4. "Finnegan's Wake"
5. "Terence's Farewell"
6. "Kilmainham's Glen" (T. Woods)
7. "The Travellin' People" (Ewan McColl)
8. "The Dublin Jack of All Trades"
9. "DeValera's Green Isle" (T. Woods)
10. "Sea of Heartbreak" (Hal David/Paul Hampton)
11. "The Grosse Isle Lament" (T. Woods)
12. "Leave Her Johnny Leave Her"

All songs (Traditional, Arranged by T. Woods), except as noted.

- Terry Woods – Mandolin, Cittern, Bouzouki, Banjo [5-string], Acoustic Guitar, Concertina, Backing vocals, lead vocals on "DeValera's Green Isle"
- Paul Harrigan – Accordion, Whistle, Uilleann pipes
- Dave Browne -Acoustic Guitar, Electric Guitar
- Steve Browne – Drums, Percussion, Backing Vocals
- David "Sparky" Hughes – Electric Bass, Keyboards, Backing Vocals
- Shane Martin – Lead Vocals

With:

- Ronnie Drew – Vocals on "The Dublin Jack of All Trades"
- Yvonne McMahon – Backing Vocals on "The Spanish Lady"

Recorded at The Factory, Spring 2002.
