= Don't Cry / I Love to Party =

Single by Kaye Styles and Johnny Logan

from the album It Iz What It Iz
- Released: 10 July 2006
- Genre: Electronic; pop
- Length: 3:00
- Label: Mostiko
- Songwriter(s): Plankton Maffia; Kaye Styles; Johnny Logan; Shay Healy
- Producer(s): Frank Jordens

Kaye Styles singles chronology
"Profile" (2006)	"Don't Cry / I Love to Party" (2006)	"Prison Break Anthem" (2006)

Johnny Logan singles chronology
"We All Need Love" (2004)	"Don't Cry / I Love to Party" (2006)	"Dancing with My Father" (2009)

"Don't Cry / I Love to Party" is a double A-sided single released by Belgian singer/songwriter Kaye Styles and Australian born Irish singer/songwriter Johnny Logan. The songs are re-working of Logan's two winning Eurovision Song Contest songs, "Hold Me Now" and "What's Another Year". The single was released in July 2006 and included on Styles' album It Iz What It Iz.

== Background and release ==
In 2006, Kaye Styles entered Eurosong '06, which was the Belgian national final for choosing the Belgian entry for the Eurovision Song Contest 2006, with the song "Profile". The song placed 6th in the final. During the final, two-time winner Johnny Logan was part of the professional jury awarding points. Following the final, the pair collaborated with Style re-working Logan's "Hold Me Now" as "Don't Cry" and "What's Another Year" as "I Love to Party". The single was released as a double-A sided single, and video clips were produced for both songs.

== Track listings ==
CD single (Mostiko – 23 21845-2)
No.	Title	Length
1.	"Don't Cry" (AP Smooth Mix)	3:00
2.	"I Love to Party" (Frank J Mix)
3.	"Don't Cry" (Frank J Mix)	3:00
4.	"So Fine" (Frank J Mix)

Don't Cry Remixes CD single (Hit 'n' Hot Music - H'N'H CDS 391)
No.	Title	Length
1.	"Don't Cry" (AP Smooth Mix)	3:00
2.	"Don't Cry" (Frank J Mix)	3:00
3.	"Don't Cry" (Housetrap Radio Rmx)	3:50
4.	"Don't Cry" (Housetrap Extended Rmx)	5:06
5.	"Don't Cry" (video)	3:00

== Charts ==
Chart (2006)	Peak position
Ireland (IRMA)	25
