= We All Need Love =

We All Need Love may refer to:

- "We All Need Love" (song), a 1992 song by Double You, or the accompanying album
- We All Need Love (album), a 2003 album by Johnny Logan
