= Walk Don't Walk =

Walk Don't Walk may refer to:

- Walk... Don't Walk, a 1968 film starring Chevy Chase
- "Walk Don't Walk", song by Judie Tzuke from Ritmo 1983
- "Walk Don't Walk", song Ron Kavanna from Coming Days
- "Walk Don't Walk", song from Oh Boy (The Paradise Motel album)
- "Walk Don't Walk", song by Prince from Diamonds and Pearls
