= Ron Kavana =

- Born: Ronnie Kavanagh; 21 June 1950; Dublin, Ireland
- Origin: Fermoy, County Cork, Ireland
- Died: 4 May 2024 (aged 73)
- Genres: Celtic music, British blues, British soul, folk, folk rock, rhythm and blues

Ronnie Kavanagh (21 June 1950 – 4 May 2024), known by his stage name Ron Kavana, was an Irish singer, songwriter, guitarist and multi-instrumentalist, and band leader. Born in the County Cork town of Fermoy, he was the son of an Irish father and an American mother from Chicago with Cajun roots.

Performing with a lengthy list of bands, Kavana performed with influential musicians from the worlds of Celtic music, British soul, blues, rhythm & blues, rock, Irish folk and folk-rock, and worldbeat music. His Galway to Graceland album was described as an album of blues, Tex Mex, country, rock, cajun, and occasionally Irish influenced music. A talented songwriter, Kavana has written songs exploring history and politics, as well as drinking, dancing, and playing music. The Village Voice has called him a "hard-hitting, no-nonsense realist".

== Biography ==
=== Early career ===
Kavana (credited as "Kavanagh") joined the Fermoy folk/rock band Loudest Whisper in the early 1970s. Band member Brian O'Reilly wrote a celtic musical based on the Irish myth of The Children Of Lir in 1972, which was developed into a stage production the following year with Kavana in the role of Lir. The project was adapted into the group's first record, Children Of Lir, in 1974, which was to be Kavana's final contribution to the band, playing slide guitar and also singing "Lir's Lament".

In the late 1970s, he moved to London, getting a job at Rock on Records, replacing Philip Chevron, who was leaving to work full-time with his band, The Radiators From Space. In 1977, Kavana put together Kavana's Krisis Band, playing regularly at Islington's Hope and Anchor. This band evolved into Juice on the Loose, who became something of a house band for Ace Records, with Kavana as band leader and producer. During this era, Kavana and members of the band toured and recorded with many American acts, including Big Jay McNeely, Clarence "Frogman" Henry, Willie Egan, Dr. John, Doug Sahm, Augie Meyers and Flaco Jiminez, Wallace Davenport, Gatemouth Brown, Memphis Slim, Champion Jack Dupree, and Slim Gaillard. Kavana appears on Juice on the Loose's self-titled album, released on Line Records in 1981. Other Juice on the Loose recordings would surface on Kavana's first solo album, Rollin' & Coastin'.

Throughout the 1970s and 1980s, Kavana also played with Panama Red, The Thunderbirds, The Balham Alligators, and the Alexis Korner Band. Following a European R & B package tour backing Korner, Kavana played an anniversary show for the Boogie Woogie Band's anniversary at Dingwalls, with an all-star band that included Charlie Watts on drums and Jack Bruce on bass.

=== Solo career ===
Kavana released his first solo album, Rollin' & Coastin' in 1985, on the Italian record label, Appaloosa. The album was a compilation of solo tracks and Juice on The Loose recordings.

In the mid/late 1980s, Kavana opened several tours for The Pogues, including a December/January 1985/1986 jaunt through Ireland, where he performed as a duo with Elvis Costello. Pogues management considered Kavana as a replacement for departing bass player/singer Cait O'Riordan. The band chose road crew member Darryl Hunt for the job, but Kavana made several appearances on The Pogues' album If I Should Fall From Grace With God, and co-wrote two songs with Pogue Terry Woods: "Every Man Is A King (In The U.S. of A.)" and "Young Ned of the Hill", the former released originally as a B-side and the latter included on The Pogues album, Peace and Love.

In 1990, Kavana produced the album For The Children. Featuring 29 guests (including several members of The Pogues), the album was a fundraiser for LILT (London Irish Live Trust), a charity organisation working for peace in Northern Ireland.

By the late 1980s, Kavana had formed the eclectic group Alias Ron Kavana (originally called "Nightbeats"). The group was subsequently named "Best Live Act in the World" by Folk Roots magazine in 1989, 1990, and 1991. The Alias Band's first album, Think Like a Hero, was released in 1989. Alias Ron Kavana's second album, Coming Days, followed in 1991.

Ron's second solo effort, Home Fire, was released by Special Delivery (an imprint of Topic Records) in 1991. The album included vocal and instrumental contribution from Pogue Terry Woods, who also appeared together with Kavana in the 1990 Ken Loach film, Hidden Agenda, performing the Wolfe Tones' song "The Ballad Of Joe McDonnell".

Kavana again entered Pogues territory, this time playing guitar in an early version of Shane MacGowan's band The Popes. Kavana's guitar work can be heard on "Haunted", a duet featuring Sinéad O'Connor. He also came up with the tune for "Snake With Eyes of Garnet" from MacGowan's first solo album, The Snake, although he received no credit for this work.

After quitting The Pogues, Woods joined with Kavana and formed a new band, The Bucks. This line-up recorded the album Dancing to the ceili band, released in 1994 on WEA. The album and the band's live shows were well received by fans and critics, but the group disbanded after a short time. Kavana cited lack of label support as a reason, and claimed he "never got a penny" for the album.

Re-establishing Alias Ron Kavana with a mostly new lineup, Kavana recorded Galway to Graceland (ARK 002) in 1995. The album was self-financed and produced independently. Due to financial difficulties it was deleted before getting a full release.

=== Later career ===
In 1995, frustrated by problems with record labels and the music business generally, and finding himself financially under pressure, Kavana took a three-year break from the industry, enrolling in a full-time Humanities course, graduating with first-class honours in Irish studies and film studies.

Through the 1990s, Kavana worked with Ace Records to license and release Irish music from the extensive archives of Topic Records, resulting in the "Irish" series - nine albums compiled & annotated by Kavana, released between 1993 - 1997 on Ace's "Globe Style" imprint

In 1999, Kavana released a live album Alien Alert, recorded in the San Francisco Bay area with local band The Resident Aliens.

Kavana returned to Fermoy, Ireland, in the early 2000s, and continued to play small shows on his own, with The Alias Acoustic Band, or other friends and performers, throughout the years.

Working on and off for several years, Kavana released a two-disc set Irish Songs of Rebellion, Resistance and Reconciliation in 2006. This was followed by the 2007 four disc set Irish Ways: Story of Ireland in Song, Music & Poetry. The albums followed Irish history through songs and poems from 1796 to the present day. The albums are credited to The Alias Acoustic Band.

A final collection was released on Primo in 2011, 40 Favourite Folk Songs, was a collection of recordings by Kavana and a number of friends, and was credited to "Ron Kavana & Friends".

In November 2016, Kavana joined his old Juice On The Loose bandmates Charlie Hart, Ed Deane, Gerraint Watkins and Les Morgan for a few low-key reunion shows in Ireland and England.

=== Personal life ===
At some point in the late 1980s/early 1990s, Kavana became romantically involved with Dutch fiddler Miriam Kelly, who would later change her name to Miriam Kavana, and become a member of Alias Ron Kavana and The Bucks.

Kavana later married Breda (née Mulcahy), and the two had a daughter, Georgia.

Kavana died on 4 May 2024, at the age of 73, after a long illness.

== Discography ==
=== Albums ===
- Juice on the Loose (1981) (Juice On The Loose), Chiswick Records
- Rollin' & Coastin (1985), (Ron Kavana) Appaloosa Records
- Think Like a Hero (1989) (Alias Ron Kavana), Chiswick Records
- For the Children (1990) (LILT – The London Irish Live Trust), Alias Records
- Coming Days (1991) (Alias Ron Kavana), Chiswick Records
- Home Fire (1991) (Ron Kavana), Special Delivery/Topic Records, Green Linnet Records (1992)
- Dancin' To The Ceili Band (1994) (The Bucks), WEA
- Galway to Graceland (1995) (Alias Ron Kavana), Alias Recordings
- Alien Alert (live) (1999) (Ron Kavana with The Resident Aliens), Proper Records
- Irish Songs of Rebellion, Resistance and Reconciliation (2006) (Ron Kavana and the Alias Acoustic Band), Primo Records
- Irish Ways: Story of Ireland in Song, Music & Poetry (2007) (Ron Kavana) Proper Records
- 40 Favourite Folk Songs (2011) (Ron Kavana and Friends), Primo Records
- Forgotten People (2014) (Ron Kavana), Real Records
- Respect (2016) (Ron Kavana), Real Records

=== Other releases ===
- "Any Way The Wind Blows" and "Fermoy" on Any Way The Wind Blows 7" Single (Juice On The Loose) (1980) The Songwriter's Workshop
- "Sweet Love In The Valley", b-side on Cowboys And Indians 7" Single (Juice On The Loose) (1981) The Songwriter's Workshop
- "A Living Wage" on Hard Cash (Various Artists) (1990) Green Linnet Records
- "Who Knows Where the Time Goes?" on Get Weaving (Various Artists) (1992) Weaving Records
- "Stand/Close It Down" (as Ron & Miriam Kavana) Undefeated - A Benefit For The Miners (Various Artists) (1992) Fuse Records
- "Lovely Cottage-Gold Ochra At Killarny Point To Points" on Folk Heritage (Various Artists) (1992) Music Club International
- "Lovely Cottage-Gold Ochra At Killarny Point To Points" on Folk Heritage II (Various Artists) (1992) Music Club International
- "As I Roved Out" on Giving People Choices (Various Artists) (1993) ActionAid
- "Reconciliation" on The Folk Collection (Various Artists) (1993) Topic Records
- "I Want to See the Bright Lights Tonight" on The World Is a Wonderful Place: The Songs of Richard Thompson (Various Artists) (1993) Green Linnet Records
- "Sloop John B." on Out on the Rolling Sea - A Tribute to Joseph Spence (Various Artists) (1994) Hokey Pokey Records
- "The Kilshannig Wager" on The Folk Collection 2 (Various Artists) (1995) Topic Records
- "Home Fire/Beyond The Pale" on Delicias Celtas (Various Artists) (1995) Ediciones Resistencia
- "St. Patrick's Day In New Orleans" (as Alias Ron Kavana) on fRoots #6 (Various Artists) (1996) Folk Roots
- "Reconciliation", "Fermoy Regatta/Tom's Tavern" on A Living Thing: Contemporary Classics of Traditional Irish Music (Various Artists, Produced by Ron Kavana) Globe Style
- "Pennies For Black Babies" (as Alias Ron Kavana) on Roots - 20 Years Of Essential Folk, Roots & World Music (Various Artists) (1999) Manteca
- "Reconciliation" on Topic Records: Three Score & Ten: A Voice to the People (Various Artists) (1999) Topic Records

== In film ==
Kavana has appeared in and/or composed music for the soundtracks of such films as Sid and Nancy, Ryan's Daughter, and Hidden Agenda (1990).
