= Think Like a Hero =

Studio album by Ron Kavana
- Released: 1989
- Label: Chiswick
- Producer: David Young

Ron Kavana chronology
Think Like a Hero (1989)	Home Fire (1991)

Think Like a Hero is an album released by Irish musician/songwriter Ron Kavana and was released by Chiswick Records in 1989. The album is credited to Alias Ron Kavana and was the debut of Kavana's Alias Band. The album was recorded and mixed at The Church, Crouch End, London.

== Track listing ==
All tracks composed by Ron Kavana; except where indicated

1. "Waxin' The Gaza" (instrumental) - (2:32)
2. "Everyman Is a King (In the US of A)" (Terry Woods, Kavana) - (4:49)
3. "Gone Shopping" (Philip Gaston, Kavana) - (3:04)
4. "Soweto Trembles (The Jo'Burg Jig)" - (6:10)
5. "Felice (I. Withwham, Kavana) - (6:34)
6. "This Is the Night (Fair Dues to 'The Man')" - (4:54)
7. "Gold Ochra at Killarney Point to Points - (2:33)
8. "Midnight on the Water" - (6:24)
9. "Caoimhneadh Roisin/Tre Ceathar a Hocht" (Kavana, Artie Dunn) - (5:09)
10. "Four Horsemen" (Kavana, Terry Woods) - (4:04)
11. "Reconciliation" - (4:25)
12. "Rant 'n' Reel (Dream Demons Invoked by Christy's D.T.s)" - (3:40)

== Singles ==
Two singles were issued, in the UK and Germany, in both 7" & 12" formats.

- Indicates a non-album track / mix unique to this release

1. Soweto Trembles (The Jo'burg Jig) (1989):

7" Version:

- A) Soweto Trembles (The Jo'burg Jig)
- B) Rap 'N' Reel (Dream Demons Invoked By Christy's D.T's

12" Version:

- A) Soweto Trembles (The Jo'burg Jig)
- B1) Rain *
- B2) Miner's Medley: A) It's Minor This, It's Minor That. : B) Working In The Coal Mine *
- B3) No Surrender (The Consett Song) *

2. This Is The Night (Fair Dues To The Man) (1990)

7' Version:

- A) This Is The Night ("Fair Dues To The Man") Remix*
- B) Gold Ochra At Killarney Point To Points

12" Version:

- A) This Is The Night ("Fair Dues To The Man") Remix *
- B1) Gold Ochra At Killarney Point To Points
- B2) Fight It *

== Personnel ==
Alias Band:

- Ron Kavana – Vocals, Acoustic & Electric Guitars, Mandolin, Mandola, Tenor Banjo, Synthesiser, Percussion
- Mick Molloy - Acoustic & Electric Guitars, mandolin & Backing vocals
- Richie Robertson - Bass & Backing vocals
- Les Morgan - Drums & Percussion

Guests:

- Mickey Weaver - Fiddle (1, 2)
- Fran Byrne - Bodhran (1, 12)
- Alan Dunn - Accordion (2, 8)
- Abdul Tee-Jay - Electric Lead Guitar (3, 4)
- Dick Farrelly - Electric Lead Guitar (5)
- Geraint Watkins - Piano (5), Organ (12)
- Fife Toumani - Acoustic Rhythm Guitar (6)
- Debi Doss & Shirley Roden - Backing Vocals (6)
