= Home Fire (album) =

Studio album by Ron Kavana
- Released: 1991
- Label: Special Delivery, Green Linnet

Ron Kavana chronology
Think Like a Hero (1989)	Home Fire (1991)	Dancin' To The Ceili Band (1994)

Home Fire is the fourth album by Irish musician/songwriter Ron Kavana. Released in 1991 on the Special Delivery label of Topic Records(and the next year in America on Green Linnet), the album is really a joint project with Terry Woods, formerly of The Pogues. The album features two Kavana/Woods co-writes, including "Young Ned Of The Hill", previously recorded by The Pogues on the album Peace and Love. About half the tracks are performed by Kavana and Woods unaccompanied, the other half with other musicians.

In 2009 Reconciliation was included in Topic's 70 year anniversary boxed set Three Score and Ten as track ten on the fifth CD.

== Track listing ==
All tracks composed by Ron Kavana; except where indicated

1. "Home Fire/Beyond The Pale" (3:05) (Ashley Dreese, Kavana, Tomas Lynch)
2. "Johnny Go Easy" (4:04)
3. "Blind Sheehan" (5:06) (Traditional)
4. "Handcuffs/Gran' Sheriff of Ballydaheen" (3:20)
5. "Kilshannig Wager" (1:32)
6. "Lovely Cottage/Gold Ochra at Killarney Point to Points" (3:30)
7. "Sands of Time Lament" (3:11) (Kavana, Purdon)
8. "Barleycorn/Kerry Polka/Wren's Polka" (4:28) (Traditional)
9. "Reconciliation" (4:34)
10. "The Cricklade Culchee/Down The Lane" (3:47) (Kavana, Rod Stradling)
11. "Blackwaterside" (3:18)
12. "Fermoy Regatta/Tom's Tavern" (2:45) (Kavana, Terry Woods)
13. "Young Ned Of The Hill" (4:59) (Kavana, Terry Woods)

== Personnel ==
- Ron Kavana - Banjo, Vocals, Mandola, Tenor Banjo, Bodhran, Mandolin, Percussion, Guitar, Bouzouki
- Terry Woods - Mandolin, Vocals, Concertina
- Kevin Rowsome - Uilleann pipes
- Ashley Dreese - Fiddle
- Rod Stradling - Button Accordion
- Tomas Lynch - Uilleann pipes, Tin Whistle, Backing Vocals
- Fran Byrne - Bodhran
- Alan Dunn - Piano Accordion
- Mick Flynn - Tin Whistle, Backing Vocals
