= Ed Deane =

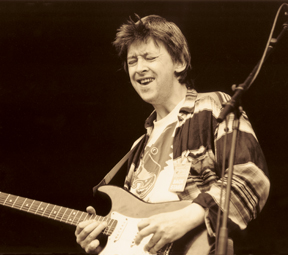

Background information
- Born: Edmund John Deane; 18 November 1952 (age 73); Dublin, Ireland
- Genres: Blues, rock
- Occupation: Musician
- Instruments: Electric guitar, slide guitar, lap steel guitar, acoustic guitar, vocals
- Years active: 1968–present
- Website: Ed Deane

Edmund John 'Ed' Deane (born 18 November 1952 in Dublin) is an Irish guitarist with a career spanning six decades, from the late 1960s to the present day. He is a blues musician, playing the electric and acoustic guitar, and specialising in slide guitar and the lap steel guitar.

Deane is highly regarded as a left-handed guitarist, preferring to play right-handed guitars upside down.

== Career ==
Deane started playing acoustic blues and slide guitar while at school. His repertoire at the time drew mainly from the Delta blues of Son House, Robert Johnson and Skip James. At 16 years of age, he formed the band Blueshouse. Their regular blues sessions in Slatterys were regularly joined by Gary Moore and Phil Lynott, and Blueshouse played alongside many visiting bluesmen of the time, such as Arthur "Big Boy" Crudup, Fred McDowell, Champion Jack Dupree, Johnny Shines and Juke Boy Bonner, among others. Moving to London, he played with Granny's Intentions, for a period, and then joining Terry and Gay Woods as guitarist with the Woods Band, touring Europe and recording one self-titled album in 1971.

Deane went on to replace Gary Moore in Skid Row, before joining Bees Make Honey and cutting an album with them, produced by Nick Lowe. He then spent four years in France, mainly in Paris working with the Rock band Il Barritz, and doing writing and session work. Returning to London, he recorded with Graham Parker and the Rumour, The Fallen Angels (Pretty Things) and co-founded Juice on the Loose with Ron Kavana and Geraint Watkins. Juice toured Germany as the backing band for Alexis Korner and Chris Farlowe. They also gigged extensively and recorded an album for Ace records. Deane was asked to join Frankie Miller, with whom he recorded and toured Europe, the UK and America.

Later, he appeared in the Mike Figgis movie Stormy Monday (which featured Tommy Lee Jones, Sting and Melanie Griffith). He also contributed substantially to the soundtrack and was the only featured guitarist apart from B. B. King. Deane also played on the soundtracks of the films Leaving Las Vegas and Serendipity (with Bap Kennedy).

Deane spent much of the 1990s working with blues diva Dana Gillespie, recording several albums with her. During this period Gillespie was voted 'Best British Female Blues Singer', before being installed in the British Blues Connection Hall of Fame. He also worked and toured with Dave Kelly, recording three albums, one of which featured John P. Hammond. At this time, Deane was also recording and gigging with R&B artists such as Shuggie Otis, Sonny Rhodes, Larry Johnson, Lowell Fulson, Richard Berry, Big Jay McNeely and George "Wild Child" Butler. He toured Germany with Paul Jones and The Blues Band, and then the UK, Europe and India with Dana Gillespie. He appeared with Gillespie at the Mustique Blues Festival in the Caribbean, and also played with her as Bob Dylan's opening act on the English leg of Dylan's 1997 tour. Deane has also recorded and played live gigs with Shane MacGowan.

Deane recorded with Chris and Mick Jagger on a tribute album to Cyril Davies. Deane worked with Chris on two of his solo albums (Atcha and Rock the Zydeco), and as a part of the Atcha Acoustic, toured America, Europe and India. Deane also recorded an album, Hurricane, with the boogie-woogie pianist, Ben Waters (another Atcha Acoustic member).

In recent years, Deane has recorded two albums with the Belfast songwriter Bap Kennedy (The Big Picture and Lonely Street). He toured extensively with Kennedy, and together they have toured with Van Morrison, both as members of a band and as a duo. Before returning to live in Ireland, Deane toured America, the UK and Europe with Nick Lowe, joined by the songwriting team of Dan Penn and Spooner Oldham.

In 2005, he first played the Castlebar Blues Festival with his own band and has since settled back in Ireland, playing regularly with Henry McCullough, John Quearney, Noel Bridgeman, Trevor Knight, James Delaney and others. In 2010, he toured Europe with Donovan.

Among other projects, he co-wrote and starred in a theatre production, the critically acclaimed The Devils Spine Band.
