= Dr. Strangely Strange =

Irish band

- Dr Strangely Strange - Tim Booth, Ivan Pawle and Tim Goulding - late 1960s

Background information
- Origin: Dublin, Ireland
- Genres: Folk pop, folk rock, psychedelic folk, freak folk, experimental, avant-garde
- Years active: 1967–1971, 1973–the early 1980s, 1996 (small reunion), 2007–present
- Labels: Island, Vertigo, Hux, Hannibal, Witchseason Production Company
- Members: Tim Booth; Ivan Pawle; Tim Goulding; Joe Thoma
- Past members: Humphrey Weightman; Brian Trench; Caroline "Linus" Greville; Neil Hopwood; Gay Woods; Terry Woods

Dr. Strangely Strange are an Irish experimental folk group, formed in Dublin in 1967 by Tim Booth (born 6 September 1943, County Kildare, Ireland), vocals and guitar, and Ivan Pawle (born 17 August 1943, England), bass and keyboards.

== Career ==
After playing an initial 1967 Trinity College gig with guitarist Humphrey Weightman, and some 1968 gigs with keyboard player/vocalist Brian Trench, Booth and Pawle teamed up with multi-instrumentalist Tim Goulding (born 15 May 1945, Hatch Street, Dublin), vocals, recorder and keyboards, at that time an aspiring painter. Goulding and Pawle were living and rehearsing in a Lower Mount Street house rented by Goulding's girlfriend, "Orphan Annie" Mohan, which its tenants nicknamed "The Orphanage". Tim Booth later lived in a second Orphanage in Sandymount, Dublin. The two Orphanages became a springboard for a new generation of Irish rock, helping launch the careers of Thin Lizzy's Phil Lynott, Gary Moore and others. Percussionist/vocalist Caroline "Linus" Greville joined the band for two brief periods in 1968 and 1969. Gary Moore often sat in on live shows in this time as well, before he joined Skid Row, augmenting the band on various instruments. After signing with the Incredible String Band's producer and manager Joe Boyd, Dr Strangely Strange debuted in 1969 with Kip of the Serenes. The album was produced by Boyd. Later in the year Pawle guested on the Incredible String Band's Changing Horses album. Linus was asked to leave to cut down on touring costs at the end of 1969, after some early recording sessions for the next LP. The band became popular on the UK college circuit, playing support slots the length and breadth of the UK.

Their second album, Heavy Petting, was released in September 1970 and included Dave Mattacks on drums and a returning Gary Moore on lead guitar. In summer 1970, at a Burton-on-Trent concert, they enlisted drummer Neil Hopwood. Goulding left at the start of 1971 to briefly study Buddhism at Samye Ling monastery and then work on his painting career. Pawle and Booth teamed with Gay Woods and Terry Woods for a six-week European tour, but Dr Strangely Strange began falling apart. The group disbanded in May 1971, after playing a concert with Al Stewart at London's Drury Lane Theatre. Booth and Pawle felt the combination was not working, and there were tensions in the band. The Woods explained: "We said that if the Strangelies hadn't gotten it together during the time we were on the Continent then we would leave, because six weeks of gigging should pull a band tighter. Unfortunately, instead of getting together, they were getting looser".

== Reunions, reissues, and later releases ==
Tim Booth, Ivan Pawle, and Tim Goulding reunited in 1972 for an Irish tour. Tim Booth led a new lineup through 1973. Booth, Goulding, and Ivan Pawle reconvened again in the early 1980s, joined by fiddle/mandolin player Joe Thoma. The four piece lineup of Booth, Goulding, Pawle, and Thoma has remained the core lineup of the band to the present day, although only performing intermittently.

In October 1994, the band played at the Griffin Hotel in Leeds as part of an Incredible String Band convention weekend. The band reformed to record a third album in 1996. Gary Moore guested again.

In 2005, the group performed an acoustic gig in a cabbage patch as part of a wake for Annie Christmas, of the "Orphanage" house on Sandymount, Dublin, where the band used to live.

On 16 June 2007, the band regrouped for a Bloomsday concert at London's 12 Bar Club to mark the launch of the archive collection Halcyon Days. This was followed by a special homecoming gig in the Sugar Club on Leeson Street, Dublin, Ireland on 1 March 2008.

In February 2009, Hux Records reissued Kip of the Serenes as a Collectors' Edition with four bonus tracks.

On 19 July 2009, the band participated in the Witchseason Weekender (featuring artists from Joe Boyd's Witchseason Productions company) at The Barbican, London. They performed a free concert on the foyer stage and then participated in the full Sunday evening concert entitled The Music of the Incredible String Band.

October 2011 saw the Hux re-release of Heavy Petting, marked by a launch gig at London's Jazz Café.

A book about the band's heyday, Dr Strangely Strange – Fitting Pieces To The Jigsaw (Adrian Whittaker) was published in 2019, with extensive contributions from Pawle, Booth and Goulding.

In October 2022, American label, Think Like A Key Records, released the Radio Sessions album, compiled from BBC, Dutch, and Danish radio broadcasts from 1970 & 1971. The CD edition includes a 1970 rehearsal track with Gary Moore from the Heavy Petting sessions.

== Later events ==
Outside the band, Tim Goulding has become a successful artist & painter, Tim Booth became a graphic designer and made animated films, while Ivan Pawle ran a laundrette.

Humphrey Weightman moved to England and became a graphic designer. Neil Hopwood went on to join the Sutherland Brothers Band, and then R. Cajun And The Zydeco Bros.

Gay Woods and Terry Woods returned to performing as The Woods Band, then continuing on as Gay & Terry Woods. Gay later co-founded Auto Da Fé while Terry joined The Pogues.

Friend of the band Gary Moore joined Skid Row, Thin Lizzy, and then achieved considerable success as a solo artist before dying from a heart attack on 6 February 2011 (aged 58).

== Discography ==
- Kip of the Serenes (Island Records, July 1969) (reissued with bonus tracks 2009, Hux Records)
- Heavy Petting (Vertigo Records, 1970) (reissued with bonus tracks 2011, Hux Records)
- Alternative Medicine (Big Beat Records, 1997)
- Halcyon Days (Hux Records, 2007)
- Radio Sessions (Think Like A Key Records, 2022)
- Anti-Inflammatory (Think Like A Key Records, 2025)
