= Independent Man =

Independent Man may refer to:

- Independent Man, an 1899 statue atop the Rhode Island State House
- An Independent Man, a 1995 television series produced by Allan McKeown
- "Independent Man", a song by Roberta Flack from the 1978 album Roberta Flack
- "Independent Man", a song by Johnny Logan from the 2012 album The Irish Connection 2
