= Lowlands of Holland =

Scottish folk song

The Lowlands of Holland (Roud 484) is a Scottish folk song in which a young woman sings about her husband, who was conscripted or "pressed" by the English into an Anglo-Dutch conflict in Europe or the West Indies. In 1741 James Oswald published "Collection of Curious Scots Tunes", containing "Low Lands of Holland". This was without any words, but a broadside sheet, dated to 1776 is in the British Library. It is the 21st catalogue entry under "Lowlands of Holland". Versions of the song exist in Ireland, Scotland and at times England, and several variants of the lyrics exist. The song variously describes the young man's conscription, the woman's grief at his death and her refusal to adorn herself or marry again, and sometimes a verse where the woman's mother advises her to find a new partner, or an account of the man's ship sinking.

== Background ==
Several European nations used forced recruitment by various means. The best known example is the dependence of the Royal Navy on impressment as a means to supply sailors to its ships during wartime from the 17th to the early 19th centuries. "The Lowlands of Holland" probably originated during the Anglo-Dutch Wars in the 17th century, and enjoyed revivals in popularity during the Wars of Louis XIV and the Napoleonic Wars. "Lowlands" is a traditional name for Holland and the broader Low Countries, while in some versions of the song the mention of tropical vegetation suggests the title of the song refers in fact to Dutch colonies in the West Indies.

A lesser known version of the song, originating from Suffolk and probably a local adaptation, dates to the era of the Seven Years' War, fought in the Low Countries and Prussia/Silesia in the mid-eighteenth century. In this version the singer's love who is leaving is a soldier rather than a sailor; and one of the verses refers to his participation in the Battle of Minden in 1759. At this battle various British regiments advanced to meet the enemy. It is said that as they echeloned forward, the soldiers plucked wild roses from the hedgerows, and wore them in their hats, as the flowers reminded them of home.

The relevant verse of the song runs:

My love across the ocean
Wears a scarlet coat so fair,
With a musket at his shoulder
And roses in his hair.^{[source?]}

The fresnostate.edu website mentions variants where the location has moved to Arkansas and a version at Gibraltar.

== Modern recordings ==
Modern artists and groups who have recorded the song include:

- Paddy Tunney on The Lark in the Morning (1956) Tradition Records TLP 1004
- Lori Holland on Irish Folk Songs for Women, Volume 2 (1960) Folkways Records FW03518
- Tommy Makem on Songs of Tommy Makem (1961) Tradition Records TLP 1044
- Anne Briggs on The Hazards of Love (1963) Topic Records STOP94
- Tina Lawton on her eponymous 1965 debut album
- Martin Carthy, on his Second Album (1966)
- The Corries on the 1968 album Kishmul's Galley
- The Dubliners, on their 1969 album At Home with The Dubliners
- Steeleye Span (with vocals by Gay Woods), on their 1970 debut album Hark! The Village Wait
- Sandy Denny live on BBC Radio, 1971
- Cordelia's Dad on their eponymous 1990 album
- The Levellers, as a B side to their 1994 single "Julie"
- The Iron Horse on their 1995 album Five Hands High
- Dave Burland, on his album Benchmark (1996)
- The Chieftains (with vocals by Natalie Merchant), from their album Tears of Stone (1999)
- Jody Stecher on Oh the Wind and Rain: Eleven Ballads (1999) Appleseed Recordings, APR CD 1030
- The Zydepunks recorded an adaptation, "Lowlands of Baghdad," on their 2005 album ...And The Streets Will Flow With Whiskey
- Martha Tilston, on her album The Sea (2014)
- Ye Vagabonds, on their eponymous debut album Ye Vagabonds (2017)
- John Smith, on his album Hummingbird (2018)

== See also ==
- List of anti-war songs
