= One Night as I Lay on My Bed =

Traditional song

"One Night As I Lay On My Bed" (Roud 672) is a traditional English-language folk song.

== Synopsis ==
A young woman lies in bed thinking of her lover. She hears him tapping at her window, asking to be allowed in. She warns him that her parents will hear them. He replies that they are sound asleep. She lets him in.

== Commentary ==
The theme of the song is so common in the UK, USA and Canada that the phrase "Night-visiting song" has been coined to cover all possible versions. This category is so huge that even minor variations are classed as being a different song. "Cold Haily Windy Night" has the same story but takes place in the rain. It is Roud 135. "Blow The Candle Out" has the same story but has the discussion taking place inside the bed rather than outside the house. It is classed as Roud 368. In addition there is "The Grey Cock" (Child 248, Roud 179) where the couple are woken by a cock, and "I'm A Rover" (Roud 3135) where alcohol is a significant element.

=== Historical background ===
A fragment of a song in Johnson's "Scots Musical Museum" inspired Robert Burns to write a fuller version, published in 1803.

== Cultural relationships ==
Romeo and Juliet is the best-known story to contain the theme of a secret sexual liaison.

=== Standard references ===
- Roud 672
- Laws M4

==== Broadsides ====
"Drowsy sleeper" in Bodleian 1817.

=== Textual variants ===
The song exists under the titles:

- Go From My Window
- The Drowsy Sleeper
- Farewell to Bonny Galaway
- Katie Dear
- Darling Corey

The tune for "Darlin' Corey" (Roud 5723) is similar to one of the tunes for "Drowsy Sleeper". Most versions concern a hard-drinking woman who is fond of moonshine, and avoids hard work. One version, as sung by The Kingston Trio, has the chorus "Wake up, wake up, darlin' Corey. What makes you sleep so sound? The revenue officer's a comin', gonna tear your still house down." This might possibly be a relic of its origins in the song "Who's that Knocking on My Window". It could be considered as a female version of "I'm A Rover".

=== Literature ===
The opening paragraphs of Emily Brontë's Wuthering Heights might have been inspired by the song, but in this case the lover is a ghost.

=== Television and movie references ===
Sung by Dick Dewey (James Murray) and the rest of the church choir to Fancy Day (Keeley Hawes) in Nicholas Laughland's adaptation of Thomas Hardy's "Under the Greenwood Tree", 2005.

=== Recordings ===
Album/Single	Performer	Year	Variant	Notes
	Blue Sky Boys	1938	Katie Dear	
	Carter Family	1938	Who's That Knocking On My Window	
At the Cafe de Paris	Marlene Dietrich	1954	Go 'Way From My Window	
Singing Family of the Cumberlands	Jean Ritchie	1955	Awake Awake Ye Drowsy Sleeper	
I Wander As I Wander	John Jacob Niles	1958	Go 'Way From My Window	
Hedy West	Hedy West	1963	Awake Awake	
Old Love Songs and Ballads	Dillard Chandler	1963	Awake Awake	
Four Strong Winds	Ian & Sylvia	1963	Katie Dear	
Joan Baez 5	Joan Baez	1964	Go 'Way From My Window	
Early Morning Rain	Ian and Sylvia	1965	Awake Ye Drowsy Sleeper	
Manchester Angel	Ewan MacColl and Peggy Seeger	1966	One Night As I Lay On My Bed	
Esther Ofarim	Esther Ofarim	1968	Go 'Way From My Window	
Hark! The Village Wait	Steeleye Span	1970	One Night As I Lay On My Bed	
Folk Songs and Ballads	Joe Hickerson	1970	Last Night As I Lay On My Bed	
Adieu To Old England	Shirley Collins	1974	One Night As I Lay On My Bed	
Abyssinians	June Tabor	1983	One Night As I Lay On My Bed	
The Rose in June	Louis Killen	1989	One Night As I Lay On My Bed	
Voices in Harmony	Swan Arcade		Go From My Window	
Lady Diamond	Bryony Griffith & Will Hampson	2011	Arise, Arise	

=== Musical variants ===
- "Silver Dagger", made famous by Joan Baez, is a related song. (Baez also recorded "Go 'way From My Window")
- "The Grey Cock" is another night-visiting song sometimes with a supernatural element.
