= Coming Days =

Studio album by Ron Kavana
- Released: 1991
- Length: 60:02
- Label: Chiswick
- Producer: Ron Kavana, David Young

Ron Kavana chronology
| Rollin' & Coastin' (In Search of America) (1985) | Coming Days (1991) | Home Fire (1991) |

Coming Days, released in 1995 on Chiswick Records, was the third album released by Irish artist Ron Kavana, the second credited to "Alias Ron Kavana". Versions of two songs - "Johnny" and "Irish Ways" were previously released on the LILT album For The Children.

== Track listing ==
1. Medley: "Galtee Mór/Irish Ways/Jigs - Daniel O'Connell/Saddle the Pony" (Kavana, Traditional) - 12:11
2. "Thoughts of Abilene" (Kavana, Del Lyon) - 3:44
3. "Psycho Mary's Voodoo Blues" (Kavana, Whitwham) - 5:57
4. "Hand Me Down" (Kavana, Watkins) - 4:06
5. "Connemara/Handcuffs" [instrumental] (Kavana, Molloy) - 3:35
6. "Ain't That Peculiar/Foxhunter's Reel" (Warren "Pete" Moore, Smokey Robinson, Robert Rogers, Marvin Tarplin) - 4:16
7. "Pennies for Black Babies" (Kavana) - 3:14
8. "Johnny" (Kavana) - 7:13
9. "Cajun Ceili" (Kavana, Watkins) - 3:32
10. "Freedom Crazy" (Kavana) - 4:01
11. "If I Had a Rocket Launcher" (Bruce Cockburn) - 4:18
12. "Walk, Don't Walk" (Kavana, Miller) - 3:55

== Personnel ==
=== Alias Band ===
- Ron Kavana – Vocals, Acoustic, Electric & Slide Guitars, Mandolin, Mandola, Banjo, Keyboards, Synthesiser, Percussion, Drum Programming.
- Mick Molloy - Acoustic & Electric Guitars, Mandolin, Mandola, Percussion & Backing vocals
- Richie Robertson - Bass, Percussion & Backing vocals
- Les Morgan - Drums & Percussion
- Fran Byrne - Button Accordion & Percussion

=== Guest musicians ===
- Geraint Watkins - Keyboards, Grand Piano, Piano Accordion, Backing & Lead Vocals
- Tomas Lynch - Uilleann Pipes
- Tozie Lynch - Bones
- Len Davies - Bones
- Fife Toumani - Acoustic Guitar, Mbira & Kora

From BOILED IN LEAD:

- Drew Miller - Dive Bomb Bass & vocals
- Todd Menton - Tin Whistle
- Robin "Adan" Anderson: Dourbakee

From SONS OF THE DESERT:

- Joseph Docherty - Fiddle
- Tracey Booth - Backing Vocals

Recorded at Elephant & Watershed Studios
