= Prison Break Anthem =

Single by Kaye Styles

from the album Main Event
- Released: 2006
- Label: Mostiko
- Songwriter(s): Kaye Styles

Kaye Styles singles chronology
"Don't Cry / I Love to Party" (2006)	"Prison Break Anthem" (2006)	"Cheat on You" (2006)

"Prison Break Anthem" is a single by Belgian rapper Kaye Styles, released in 2006 on the Mostiko label. Styles version was used as the theme song for the television series Prison Break in Belgium. It peaked at number 3 on the Flanders singles chart.

== Track listing ==
Vinyl 12"
No.	Title	Length
1.	"Prison Break Anthem (Plankton Maffia Radio Version)"	3:08
2.	"Prison Break Anthem (Original version)"	3:30
3.	"Don't Cry (AP Smooth Mix)"	3:02
4.	"I Love To Party (aka What's Another Year) (Frank J Mix)"	3:08
5.	"Don't Cry (Housetrap Radio Rmx)"	3:49
6.	"I Love To Party (aka What's Another Year) (Housetrap Rmx)"	4:37

CD single
No.	Title	Length
1.	"Prison Break Anthem (Plankton Maffia Radio Version)"	3:05
2.	"Prison Break Anthem (Original version)"	3:27
3.	"Prison Break Anthem (Video)"

== Charts ==
=== Weekly charts ===
Weekly chart performance for "Prison Break Anthem"
(2006–07)	Peak position
Belgium (Ultratop 50 Flanders)	3
Russia Airplay (TopHit)	47

=== Year-end charts ===
Year-end chart performance for "Prison Break Anthem"
Chart (2007)	Position
Russia Airplay (TopHit)	157

== Release history ==
Region	Date	Format	Label
Belgium	November 2006	Vinyl	Mostiko
Poland	August 2007	CD single	Hit’n’Hot Music
Europe	2007	CD single	Digidance
