= Kaye Styles =

Belgian musician

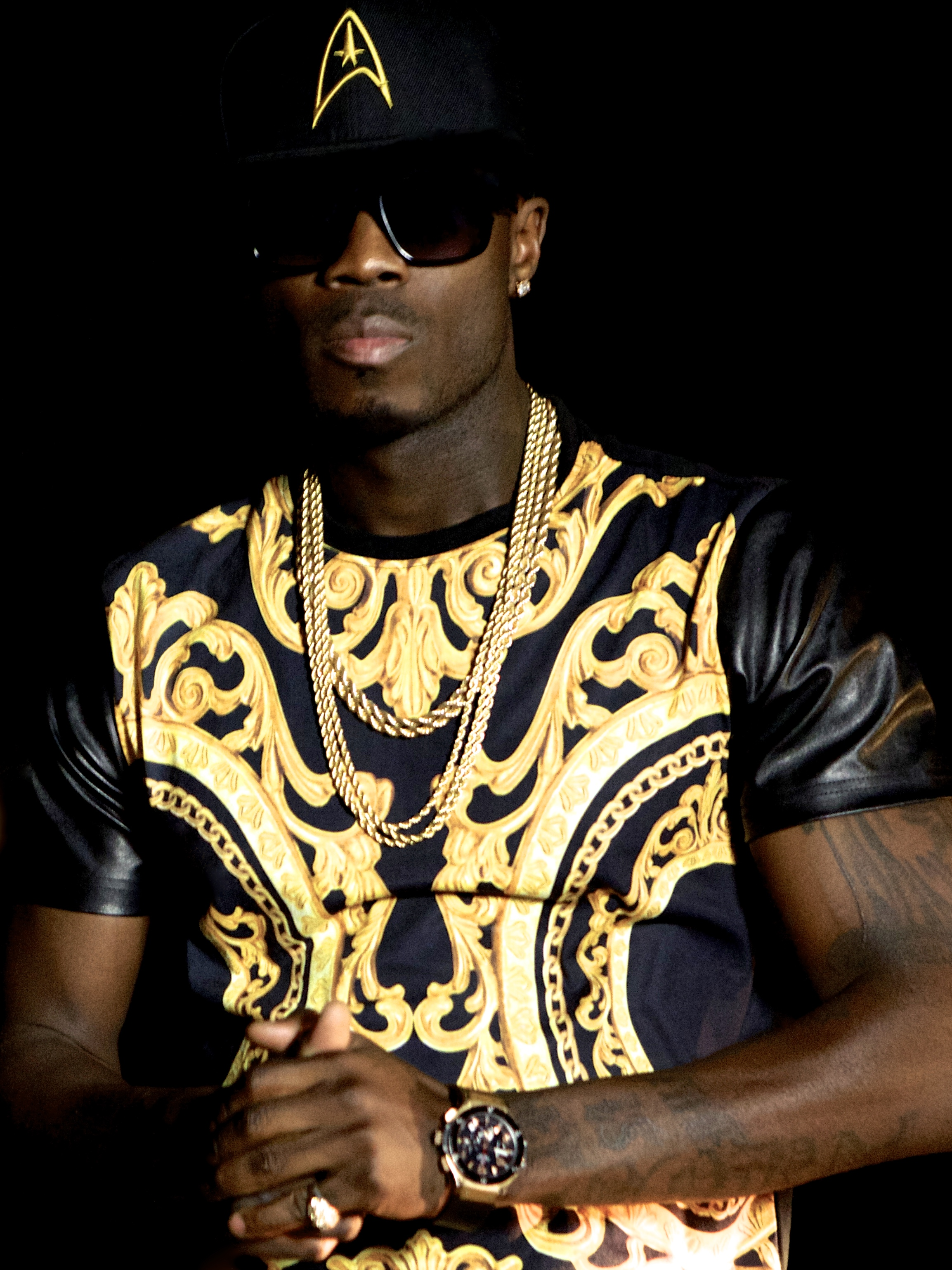
- Kaye Styles in Beverly Hills CA

Background information
- Born: Kwasi Gyasi; 8 November 1981 (age 45)
- Origin: Accra, Ghana
- Genres: Hip hop; R&B; pop; dance
- Occupations: Singer; songwriter; rapper; television personality
- Years active: 2004–present
- Labels: Yellow Productions; Bob Sinclar Digital
- Website: kaye-styles.com

Kaye Styles, born Kwasi Gyasi, is a Belgian singer, songwriter, and TV personality best known for the theme song of the international soundtrack of the hit television series Prison Break produced in 2006.

== Early life ==
Kaye Styles, whose birth name is Kwasi Gyasi was born in Ghana on 8 November 1981. He came to Belgium when he was five years old.

== Career ==
=== First album ===
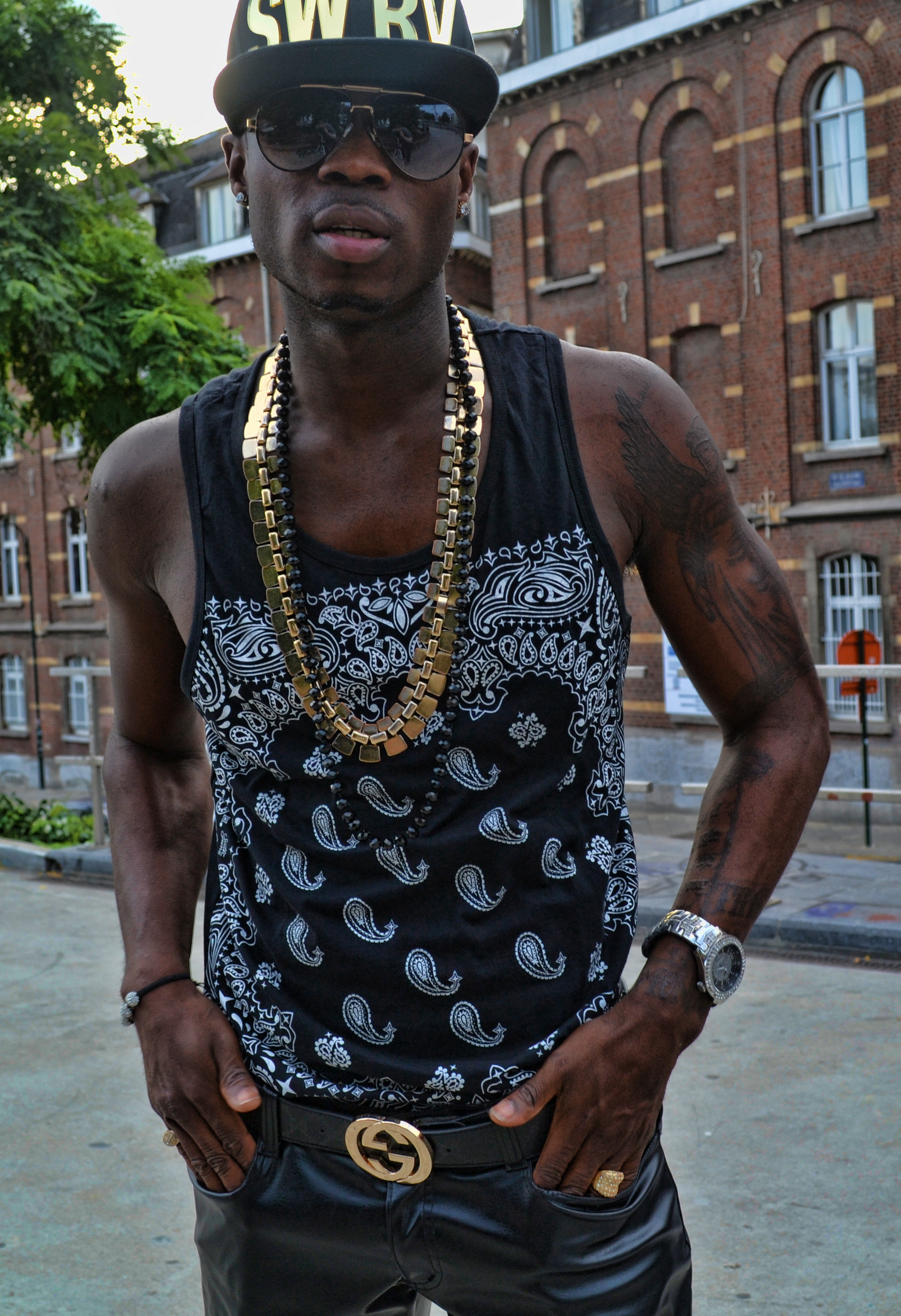
Kaye Styles in Brussels

In 2004, he released his first single "Gimme the Mic" from his first album The True Definition Of Styles. This became a modest hit in Belgium. Later that year he released "Somebody's Watchin' Me" (a "Michael Jackson cover") and "Safe Sex" with Laura Ramaekers.

=== Eurovision ===
In 2006 Styles entered the Belgian National selection for the Eurovision Song Contest with the song "Profile". He finished third in the quarter-finals and second in the semi-finals. Johnny Logan one of the judges, and two-time Eurovision Song Contest winner, was so impressed by Styles' performance that they later recorded a single together, "Don't Cry / I Love to Party" which are a mash up of Logan's "Hold Me Now" and ""What's Another Year". The songs are featured on Styles' second album It Iz What It Iz and third album entitled Main Event. The pair also performed together live at the 2006 Belgian MTV/TMF music awards held at the Antwerp Sport Palace before 20,000 people and at the Flemish "Tien om te zien" Concerts. With the release of the "Profile" Styles scored his first Belgian top 10 hit.

=== Prison Break ===
Later in 2006 Styles was asked by 20th Century Fox Television to create the title song for the Belgian version of the successful American television series Prison Break. The song "Prison Break Anthem" became a top 10 hit in Belgium, a number 1 hit on the Flemish National Radio "Radio 2" and was played in Germany, Russia, France, Finland, Estonia and all over Europe. The song's videoclip was recorded in a real prison and was broadcast on all the major Belgium Networks, "MTV Germany", and "MtV Russia". The same year he was also nominated for two TMF Awards – Best Urban National and Best Male National.

In 2006 Styles was also asked to be the opening act for Christina Aguilera's Benelux Tour.

=== Stanley's Route ===
In 2006, Styles was also a participant on the Belgian VT4 television program Stanley's Route which was a survival program, filmed in Africa, featuring famous Belgian celebrities. The other contestants were: ex-TV presenter Paul Codde, stand up comedian Vitalski, actress Mieke Bouve, Miss Belgium Joke Vandevelde, model Joyce Van Nimmen, jockey Jaak Pijpen, world Judo champion Gella Vandecaveye, actor Geert Hunaerts, Belgian boxing legend, and later friend, Freddy De Kerpel and politician Damienne Anciaux.

=== Silence – Death ===
As godfather for the project "EQUAL" Styles went to South Africa together with eight Belgian teenagers to shoot a documentary about aids Silence – Death in 2006. This documentary was broadcast on the Belgian teenage television channel "JIM"

=== First Born ===
In 2008 Styles released his fourth album First Born. This album contains a song featuring American superstars Akon and Konvict Music producer Tariq-L called "Shawty". The album itself was produced by German and American Producers like Dvo De Silva. The president of the French Cognac maker Hennessy specially flew to be present at the release party for First Born.

=== "Freedom" ===
In 2009 Styles recorded a single with Frank Ti-Aya or DJ F.R.A.N.K. one of the producers of the world hits "Summerjam", "Candy on the Dancefloor", and "Freedom". The videoclip was recorded in Marbella, Spain "Freedom" became a number 1 hit in Belgium.

=== "Ching Choing" ===
In 2011 Styles recorded a single with Michael Calfan and Bob Sinclar called "Ching Choing", this was released by Bob Sinclar's record label Bob Sinclar Digital & Yellow Productions. The single was distributed in France and Italy.

=== "Is It Love" ===
In 2011, also Styles recorded a song with Romanian singer Celia, "Is It Love", produced by the Romanian producer Costi Ioniță. The videoclip was recorded in Ukraine by Alan Badoev and, at a cost of €100,000, it would be the most expensive videoclip to come out of Eastern Europe. The song became a modest hit in Romania and Bulgaria.

== Discography ==
=== Albums ===
- True Definition of Styles (2004)
- It Iz What It Iz(2006)
- Main Event (2006)
- First Born (2008)

=== Singles ===
- "Gimme The Mic" (2004)
- "Somebody's Watchin Me" (2004)
- "Safe Sex" (2005)
- "Maria Bonita" feat Ali Tcheelab (2005)
- "Profile" (2006)
- "Don't Cry / I Love to Party" feat "Johnny Logan" (2006)
- "Prison Break Anthem" (2006)
- "Cheat on You" feat Black Cherry (2006)
- "Survivor" (2006)
- "Shawty" feat Akon and Tariq L (2008)
- "Freedom" feat Frank Ti-Aya (2009)
- "Ching Choing" Feat Michael Calfan and Bob Sinclar
- "Is It Love" feat Celia (2011)

== Filmography ==
television
Year	Title	Role	Notes
2006	Eurosong (mini series)	Himself	
2006	Stanley's route (mini series)	Himself	
2011	"Silence – Death" (TV Movie)	Himself	
