= Nature of Love =

Studio album by Johnny Logan
- Released: 7 May 2010
- Genre: Pop
- Length: 39:52
- Label: Black Pelican
- Producer: Johnny Logan

Johnny Logan chronology
Irishman in America (2008)	Nature of Love (2010)	The Irish Connection 2 (2012)

Singles from Nature of Love
- 1. "Last Days of Beautiful" Released: 2010

Nature of Love is the fourteenth studio album by Australian-born Irish singer and composer Johnny Logan, released in May 2010. The album includes Logan re-recording this two Eurovision Song Contest winning songs; "What's Another Year" and "Hold Me Now".

== Reception ==
Kaja Schau Knatten from RB said "Logan's voice is flexible, well-controlled and rich in top, middle and bottom range" on "this collection of ballads". Knatten praised "Shame on You" for its rockier sound.

== Track listing ==
Black Pelican
No.	Title	Writer(s)	Length
1.	"Last Days Of Beautiful"	Johnny Logan	3:42
2.	"When a Woman Loves a Man"	Logan, Andreas Linse	3:46
3.	"Shame On You"	Logan	4:23
4.	"Hold Me Now 2010"	Logan	3:41
5.	"Nature of Love"	Boe Larsen, Logan	3:37
6.	"Why Me?"	Logan	3:38
7.	"Between Love and Hate"	Logan	4:39
8.	"Shine On"	Logan	3:45
9.	"What's Another Year 2010"	Shay Healy	3:26
10.	"Solid Ground"	Logan	5:13

== Charts ==
Chart (2010)	Peak position
Danish Albums (Hitlisten)	9
Norwegian Albums (VG-lista)	19
Swedish Albums (Sverigetopplistan)	6
