= Trevor Knight (Irish musician) =

Irish musician, composer, sound designer and director

- Born: 1954 (age 71–72); England
- Occupations: Musician, composer, sound designer
- Instrument: Keyboard
- Formerly of: Naima; Auto Da Fé; Carrier Frequency

Trevor Knight (born 1954) is an Irish musician, composer, theatre sound designer and director. Born in England, he moved to Northern Ireland as a child where he took an interest in the piano. He briefly attended college in Dublin, at Bolton Street College and it was here where he formed his first group, Naima.

Whilst living in the Netherlands, he founded the new wave group, Auto Da Fé, along with Gay Woods. When the group split up in 1986, Trevor moved into music composition and theatre sound design.

He was elected to Aosdána in 2007.

== Discography ==
=== With Auto Da Fé ===
- 5 Singles and 1 Smoked Cod (1984) Stoic (compilation of singles tracks)
- Tatitum (1985) Spartan
- Songs for Echo (2001) Hux (live 1983 recordings)

=== With others ===
- Hold Me Now – Johnny Logan – "Heartbroken Man"
- Under the Influence – Mary Coughlan – piano, synthesizer
- Live For Ireland

== See also ==
- Carrier Frequency – Irish band
- Trevor Knight discography at Discogs
- Trevor Knight at IMDb
