= Reach for Me (album) =

Studio album by Johnny Logan
- Released: 30 March 2001
- Genre: Pop
- Label: Epic Records, Sony Music

Johnny Logan chronology
Love is All (1999)	Reach for Me (2001)	Save This Christmas for Me (2001)

Singles from Reach for Me
- 1. "Hold Me Now (2001 version)" Released: February 2001; 2. "No One Makes Love Like You" Released: 17 April 2001; 3. "Let's Make Love" Released: 2001; 4. "Taking All The Blame" Released: 2001

Reach for Me is the ninth studio album by Australian-born Irish singer and composer Johnny Logan, released in March 2001. It includes Logan re-recording his Eurovision winning tracks "What's Another Year" and "Hold Me Now".

== Track listing ==
No.	Title	Writer(s)	Length
1.	"What's Another Year" (2001 version)	Shay Healy	3:19
2.	"Hold Me Now" (2001 version)	Johnny Logan	4:17
3.	"Why Me?"	Logan	3:31
4.	"Angels"	Robbie Williams, Guy Chambers	4:25
5.	"Taking All the Blame"	Niels Pors, R. Anderson, Thomas Windfeld	4:02
6.	"How Do I Live"	Diane Warren	4:37
7.	"Surprised"	Logan	3:33
8.	"Let's Make Love" (featuring Natasja Crone)	Aimee Mayo, Bill Luther, Chris Lindsey, Marv Green	4:37
9.	"Amazed"	Green, Mayo, Lindsey	4:08
10.	"One"	Adam Clayton, David Evans, Larry Mullen, Paul Hewson	4:30
11.	"Reach for Me"	Hector, Multiman, Remee	4:19
12.	"Hold Me Now" (2001 [single version])	Logan	3:35
13.	"No One Makes Love Like You" (Nicole)	Bernd Meinunger, Ralph Siegel	3:35

== Charts ==
Chart (2001)	Peak position
Danish Albums (Hitlisten)	2
Norwegian Albums (VG-lista)	13
Swedish Albums (Sverigetopplistan)	12

== Certifications ==
Region	Certification	Certified units/sales
Denmark (IFPI Danmark)	Gold	25,000^{^}
^{^} Shipments figures based on certification alone.
