= Save This Christmas for Me =

Studio album by Johnny Logan
- Released: 28 November 2001
- Recorded: 2001
- Genre: Christmas; pop
- Length: 39:24
- Label: Epic Records, Sony Music
- Producer: Stig Kreutzfeldt, Boe Larsen, Oli Poulsen, SoulPoets

Johnny Logan chronology
Reach for Me (2001)	Save This Christmas for Me (2001)	We All Need Love (2003)

Singles from Save This Christmas for Me
- 1. "Let Love Be Love" Released: 2001; 2. "Christmas Time" Released: 2001

Save This Christmas for Me is the tenth studio album and first Christmas album by Australian-born Irish singer and composer Johnny Logan, released in Denmark in November 2001.

== Track listing ==
No.	Title	Writer(s)	Length
1.	"Christmas Time"	Jan Lysdahl	3:29
2.	"Mary's Boy Child"	traditional	3:47
3.	"Song for the Lonely"	Niels Pors, Samuel Waermö, Thomas Windfeld	3:54
4.	"Let Love Be Love" (featuring Friends)	Remee	3:52
5.	"Here I'll Stay"	Keith Follese	4:18
6.	"Finally It's Christmas Again"	Christina Undhjem, Lars Jensen, Martin M. Larsson	3:45
7.	"Happy X-Mas"	John Lennon, Yoko Ono	4:34
8.	"Do They Know It's Christmas?"	Robert Geldof, Midge Ure	3:18
9.	"Driving Home for Christmas"	Chris Rea	4:09
10.	"Save This Christmas for Me"	Johnny Logan	4:21

== Charts ==
Chart (2001)	Peak position
Danish Albums (Hitlisten)	25
