= In London (Ravi Shankar album) =

Studio album by Ravi Shankar
- Released: 1964
- Genre: Hindustani classical music
- Length: 46:46
- Label: World Pacific
- Producer: Richard Bock

Ravi Shankar chronology
India's Master Musician (1962)	In London (1964)	Ragas & Talas (1964)

Professional ratings
Review scores
Source	Rating
AllMusic	4/5 stars

In London is a studio album by Hindustani classical musician Ravi Shankar. It was published on LP record in 1964, originally with the title India's Master Musician / Recorded in London.

In the late 1990s, Squires Productions was commissioned to digitally remaster the album for Compact Disc; Wayne Hileman was the mastering engineer. Angel Records published the remastered album on 26 January 1999 under the shortened title In London.

== Personnel ==
- Ravi Shankar, sitar
- Kanai Dutt, tabla
- Nodu Mullick, tambura
- Richard Bock, record producer

== Track listing ==
No.	Title	Music	Length
1.	"Raga Hamsadhwani"	Ramaswami Dikshitar	9:17
2.	"Dhun Kafi"	Ravi Shankar	12:39
3.	"Raga Ramkali"		24:50
Total length:			46:46
