= Hark! The Village Wait =

1970 debut album by Steeleye Span

Studio album by Steeleye Span
- Released: June 1970
- Recorded: March 1970
- Studio: Sound Techniques, London
- Genre: British folk rock
- Length: 38:55
- Label: RCA, United Artists, Mooncrest, Chrysalis
- Producer: Sandy Roberton, Steeleye Span

Steeleye Span chronology
Hark! The Village Wait (1970)	Please to See the King (1971)

Professional ratings
Review scores
Source	Rating
Allmusic	link

Hark! The Village Wait is the debut album by the British folk rock band Steeleye Span, first released in 1970. It is the only album to feature the original lineup of the band, as they broke up and reformed with an altered membership immediately after its release, without ever having performed live. Therefore, it is one of only two Steeleye Span studio albums to feature two female vocalists (Maddy Prior and Gay Woods), the other being Time (1996). A similar sound was apparent years later when Prior teamed up with June Tabor to form Silly Sisters. Overall, the album's sound is essentially folk music with rock drumming and bass guitar added to some of the songs. The banjo features prominently on several tracks, including "Blackleg Miner", "Lowlands of Holland" and "One Night as I Lay on My Bed".

The album's title refers not to the act of waiting, but to a wait, a small body of wind instrumentalists employed by a town at public charge from Tudor times until the early 19th century. A village, however, would likely be too small to employ such a troupe, so the wait referred to here was most probably the later Christmas Waits, as mentioned in the novels of Thomas Hardy.

Over the years, the band has returned to the material on this album several times. On their second album, Please to See the King, they offered a new version of "The Blacksmith". A new live version of "Blackleg Miner" appeared on Back in Line, and they offered a third variation on Present--The Very Best of Steeleye Span. On Time they reprised "Twa Corbies". "Copshawholme Fair" had two years earlier been recorded by Prior and Tim Hart on their album Folk Songs of Olde England Vol. 2. Copshaw Holm, otherwise known as Newcastleton, has been the site of a folk festival since 1970. Maddy Prior has lived nearby, just over the border in Cumbria, at 'Stones Barn' for several years.

Among the other songs on the album are the a cappella "A Calling-On Song" (the first of many a cappella pieces the band recorded), "The Hills of Greenmore" and "Dark-Eyed Sailor". The version of "Lowlands of Holland" here uses variant lyrics from the most common version of the song.

The album was originally issued in the UK on RCA, with the cover shown (above right). It was not issued in the US at that time. The cover for the reissue was changed to a sepia-toned image of 'The Leather Bottle', a pub in Cobham; it was issued on UK Chrysalis (and made its debut in the US on US Chrysalis) in 1975.

== Track listing ==
All songs traditional, except where noted.

Side one
No.	Title	Writer(s)	Personnel	Length
1.	"A Calling-On Song"	Ashley Hutchings; based on the tune of the Earsdon Sword Dance Song (Roud 610)	Personnel: Maddy Prior — vocals; Tim Hart — vocals; Gay Woods — vocals; Terry Woods — vocals	1:13
2.	"The Blacksmith"	Traditional, arranged by Steeleye Span	Personnel: Prior — lead vocals; G. Woods — backing vocals; T. Woods — mandola; Hart — electric guitar; Ashley Hutchings — bass guitar; Gerry Conway — drums; uncredited — harmonium	3:41
3.	"Fisherman's Wife"	Ewan MacColl	Personnel: G. Woods — lead vocals, autoharp; Prior — backing vocals; T. Woods — mandola; Hart — 5-string banjo; Hutchings — bass guitar; Conway — drums	3:12
4.	"Blackleg Miner"	Traditional, arranged by Steeleye Span	Personnel: Hart — lead vocals, electric guitar; Prior — backing vocals; T. Woods — backing vocals, 5-string banjo, guitar; Hutchings — bass guitar; Dave Mattacks — drums	2:46
5.	"Dark-Eyed Sailor"	Traditional, arranged by Steeleye Span	Personnel: G. Woods — lead vocals, concertina; Prior — backing vocals; T. Woods — electric guitar; Hart — electric dulcimer; Hutchings — bass guitar; Conway — drums	5:59
6.	"Copshawholme Fair"	Traditional, arranged by Steeleye Span	Personnel: Prior — lead vocals; Hart — electric dulcimer; T. Woods — concertina, mandolin; G. Woods — bodhrán; Hutchings — bass guitar; Conway — drums; Gay and Maddy — step dancing	2:35

Side two
No.	Title	Writer(s)	Personnel	Length
7.	"All Things Are Quite Silent"	Collected by Vaughan Williams	Personnel: Prior — lead vocals; G. Woods — backing vocals; T. Woods — electric guitar; Hart — electric guitar; Hutchings — bass guitar; Conway — drums	2:38
8.	"The Hills of Greenmore"	Traditional, arranged by Steeleye Span	Personnel: T. Woods — lead vocals, electric guitar; G. Woods — concertina; Hart — electric dulcimer; Hutchings — bass guitar; Conway — drums	4:02
9.	"My Johnny Was a Shoemaker"	Traditional, arranged by Steeleye Span	Personnel: G. Woods — vocals; Prior — vocals	1:11
10.	"Lowlands of Holland"	Traditional, arranged by Steeleye Span	Personnel: G. Woods — lead vocals; T. Woods — electric guitar; Hart — fiddle; Prior — 5-string banjo; Hutchings — bass guitar; Mattacks — drums	6:00
11.	"Twa Corbies"	Traditional, arranged by Steeleye Span	Personnel: Prior — vocals; G. Woods — vocals; Hart — vocals, harmonium; T. Woods — electric guitar; Hutchings — bass guitar; Mattacks — drums	2:06
12.	"One Night as I Lay on My Bed"	Transcription by Henry Edward Denison Hammond	Personnel: Prior — lead vocals; G. Woods — backing vocals; T. Woods — 5-string banjo; Hart — electric dulcimer; Hutchings — bass guitar; Mattacks — drums	3:29
Total length:				38:55

== Personnel ==
Steeleye Span

- Maddy Prior - vocals, 5-string banjo
- Tim Hart - vocals, electric guitar, electric dulcimer, fiddle, 5-string banjo, harmonium
- Ashley Hutchings - bass guitar
- Terry Woods - vocals, electric guitar, concertina, mandola, 5-string banjo, mandolin
- Gay Woods - vocals, concertina, autoharp, bodhran

Guest musicians

- Gerry Conway - drums (tracks 2–3, 5–8)
- Dave Mattacks - drums (tracks 4, 10–12)
