= What's Another Year (album) =

Studio album by Johnny Logan
- Released: July 1980
- Genre: Pop
- Label: Release Records
- Producer: Bil Whelan (tracks 1 and 7), Roberto Danova and Kenneth Gibson (tracks 2, 3, 4, 6 and 8-11), L. Hurley (track 5)

Johnny Logan chronology
In London (1979)	What's Another Year (1980)	Straight from the Heart (1985)

Singles from What's Another Year
- 1. "What's Another Year" Released: April 1980; 2. "Save Me" Released: August 1980

What's Another Year is the second studio album by Irish singer Johnny Logan. The album includes his 1980 Eurovision Song Contest winning song "What's Another Year".

The album was released internationally under the title The Johnny Logan Album in October 1980.

== Track listing ==
LP/Cassette

Side A
No.	Title	Writer(s)	Length
1.	"What's Another Year"	Shay Healy	3:09
2.	"The Heartache Is On"		3:08
3.	"Slippin' Away"		3:40
4.	"One Night Stand"	Healy	3:52
5.	"All Fall Down"		3:59
6.	"Too Much Too Soon"		3:20

Side B
No.	Title	Length
1.	"Save Me"	2:56
2.	"Hollywood"	4:10
3.	"God Given Love"	3:07
4.	"Love Is a Small Town"	3:38
5.	"'Till You Happened to Me"	2:52
6.	"Louisiana Rain"	4:10

== Charts ==
Chart (1980)	Peak position
Norwegian Albums (VG-lista)	27
Swedish Albums (Sverigetopplistan)	39
