= Hold Me Now (album) =

Studio album by Johnny Logan
- Released: July 1987
- Genre: pop
- Label: Epic Records
- Producer: Bill Whelan

Johnny Logan chronology
| Straight from the Heart (1985) | Hold Me Now (1987) | Mention My Name (1989) |

Singles from Hold Me Now
- 1. "Hold Me Now" Released: April 1987; 2. "I'm Not in Love" Released: 1987

Hold Me Now is a studio album by Australian-born Irish singer and composer Johnny Logan. The album includes his 1987 Eurovision Song Contest winning song Hold Me Now and a new version of his 1980 Eurovision winning song What's Another Year?.

== Track listing ==
LP/Cassette

Side A
| No. | Title | Writer(s) | Length |
|---|---|---|---|
| 1. | "Hold Me Now" | Johnny Logan | 3:03 |
| 2. | "Stay" | Logan | 3:40 |
| 3. | "Foolish Love" | Logan | 3:07 |
| 4. | "When Your Woman Cries" | Dominic Bugatti, Frank Musker | 3:39 |
| 5. | "I'm Not In Love" | Eric Stewart, Graham Gouldman | 4:41 |

Side B
| No. | Title | Writer(s) | Length |
|---|---|---|---|
| 1. | "Helpless Heart" | Paul Brady | 3:45 |
| 2. | "What's Another Year? (New Version)" | Shay Healy | 3:12 |
| 3. | "Heartbroken Man" | Logan, Trevor Knight | 4:00 |
| 4. | "Living a Lie" | Logan, Healy |
| 5. | "Such A Lady" | Logan | 3:23 |

== Charts ==
| Chart (1987) | Peak position |
|---|---|
| Australian Kent Music Report Albums Chart | 49 |
| German Albums (Offizielle Top 100) | 18 |
| Dutch Albums (Album Top 100) | 59 |
| Norwegian Albums (VG-lista) | 12 |
| Swedish Albums (Sverigetopplistan) | 23 |
| Swiss Albums (Schweizer Hitparade) | 25 |
| UK Albums (OCC) | 83 |
