= The Bucks =

Irish folk band

The Bucks were a band who played music based largely on Irish folk, touring briefly and recording and releasing one album for WEA Records in 1994. While remaining obscure, the band was formed by well-known Irish musicians Ron Kavana and Terry Woods (of The Pogues, Sweeney's Men and Steeleye Span). Paddy Keenan played pipes. James McNally (Storm, Pogues, Afro-Celt Sound System) was also a member, as were several members of Kavana's primary group, The Alias Band (Miriam Kavana, Fran Byrne).

Despite positive reviews of both the album and the live shows, the band broke up after failing to attract enough attention. Kavana lays the blame on WEA for not promoting the album or band. He also maintains he “never got a penny” for the album.

== Discography ==
=== Dancin' To The Ceili Band (album) ===
Dancin' To The Ceili Band

Studio album by The Bucks
- Released: 1994
- Label: Warner Music, WEA

Ron Kavana chronology
Home Fire (1991)	Dancin' To The Ceili Band by The Bucks (1994)	Galway to Graceland by Alias Ron Kavana (1995)

Released in 1994 Warner Music – WEA

  1. Dancin' To The Ceili Band (R. Kavana/T. Woods) – 3:23
  2. Gra Geal Mo Chroi (R. Kavana/T. Woods) – 4:47
  3. Rashers 'n' Eggs (R. Kavana/F.Byrne/T. Woods) – 3:25
  4. The Ghost Of Winters Gone (R. Kavana/T. Woods) – 4:34
  5. Auld Time Waltzes (Trad. arr. R. Kavana/M. Kavana/F. Byrne/T. Woods) – 4:51
  6. Courtin' In The Kitchen (Trad. arr. R. Kavana/M.Kavana/T. Woods) – 4:27
  7. What A Time (R. Kavana/R. Demick/T. Woods) – 2:56
  8. An Puc Ar Buille (Trad. Arr & Translated R. Kavana/T. Woods) – 3:02
  9. Hurray Me Boys, Hurray (R. Kavana/T. Woods) – 3:38
  10. Psycho Ceili In Claremorris (R. Kavana/T. Woods) – 3:52
  11. The Bucks Set (Trad. arr. R. Kavana/M. Kavana/F. Byrne/P. Keenan/T. Woods) – 5:46

==== Personnel ====
- Terry Woods – Vocals, Mandolin, Concertina
- Ron Kavana – Vocals, Bouzouki, Mandolin, Guitar & Percussion
- Miriam Kavana – Fiddle, Harmony vocals
- James McNally – Piano Accordion, Whistles, Bodhran, Backing Vocals
- Paddy Keenan – Uilleann pipes
- Rod Demick – Fender Bass, Backing Vocals
- Fran Byrne – Drums, Button Accordion, Backing Vocals
- Mick MacAulay – Button Accordion

With Guests

- Olly Blanchflower – String Bass (Tracks 2, 10)
- Chopper – Cello (Tracks 2, 10)
- Thomas Lynch – Uilleann pipes (Track 5)
- Tim Russell – Backing vocals (Track 3)
- Duncan Cowell – Car Crash (Track 10)
- Recorded at Alias & Marcus Studios, London, March 1994.
- Produced by Ron Kavana & Terry Woods.

=== "Dancin' To The Ceili Band" (single) ===
Warner Music – WEA 1994 WMCD 16

  1. "Dancing To The Ceili Band" (R. Kavana/T. Woods) – 3:25
  2. "The Ghost Of Winters Gone" (Alternative Mix) (R. Kavana/T. Woods) – 4:12
  3. "Dancing To The Ceilie Band" (Alternative Mix) (R. Kavana/T. Woods) – 3:34
