= In London (song) =

Single by Johnny Logan

from the album In London
- B-side: "In London"
- Released: June 1980
- Genre: Pop
- Length: 3:50
- Label: Release Records, Piccadilly, CRN, RCA Records
- Songwriter(s): Roberto Danova; Shona Laing
- Producer(s): Ken Gibson; Roberto Danova

Johnny Logan singles chronology
| "What's Another Year" (1980) | "In London" (1980) | "Save Me" (1980) |

"In London" is a song recorded by Australian-born Irish singer and composer Johnny Logan. The song was first released as the B-side to Logan's 1978 debut single "No, I Don't Want to Fall In Love", which failed to chart.

The song was released as a double A-sided single with "Sad Little Woman" in June 1980 as the fourth and final single from Logan's debut studio album, In London, following Logan's win at the 1980 Eurovision Song Contest. The song charted in Germany and Belgium.

== Track listing ==
European 7" (45 RPM) single (7P 189), (RL 1017), (PB 5746)

Side A: "In London" - 3:50
Side B: "Sad Little Woman" - 3:30

== Charts ==
| Chart (1980) | Peak position |
|---|---|
| Belgium (Ultratop 50 Flanders) | 29 |
| West Germany (GfK) | 70 |
