= Irishman in America =

Studio album by Johnny Logan
- Released: September 2008
- Genre: Rock
- Length: 47:33
- Label: My Way Music
- Producer: Johnny Logan

Johnny Logan chronology
The Irish Connection (2007)	Irishman in America (2008)	Nature of Love (2010)

Singles from Irishman in America
- 1. "Dancing with My Father" Released: 2009

Irishman in America is the thirteenth studio album by Australian-born Irish singer and composer Johnny Logan, released in Europe in September 2008. The album is described as blending traditional Irish folk classics with American country & western. The album includes four original tracks, written by Logan. The album charted in Denmark, Norway and Sweden.

The album was released in Ireland in May 2009.

== Background and release ==
In 2007, Logan released The Irish Connection which went platinum in Denmark, twice platinum in Norway and gold in Sweden. The idea to release another "Irish" album was expressed by Logan's Danish friend and promoter through many years, Calle. Calle believed Logan would be loyal to his Irish background with four Irish traditional songs, four American songs plus four brand new songs, written by Logan personally.

Logan explains “We started the project just before Christmas last year even though I was still busy following up on our success with The Irish Connection.” Calle died during the production leaving Logan to self-produce. Logan said “I have personally arranged and produced all of it and I am very excited to see how it will be received. It is the first time I have tried it. But nothing has been left to chance. I have focused intently on every detail. I would like to make something more adventurous and different this time, but still remain faithful to my audience”. Logan's sons Adam, Fionn and Jack feature in the chorus of "Irishman in America".

The album was supported by a tour across Denmark in 2008.

== Track listing ==
My Way Music – M 20163-2
No.	Title	Writer(s)	Length
1.	"Rocky Road to Dublin"	traditional	3:18
2.	"The Night They Drove Old Dixie Down"	Robbie Robertson	3:38
3.	"Belle of Belfast"	traditional	4:25
4.	"Dancing With My Father"	Andreas Linse, Johnny Logan	4:56
5.	"This Land Is Your Land"	Woody Guthrie	3:55
6.	"Piece of My Heart"	Jerry Ragovoy, Bert Berns	4:07
7.	"The Alabama Song"	Kurt Weill, Bertolt Brecht	4:37
8.	"Bridges of My Heart"	Logan	3:40
9.	"Sorry"	Linse, Logan	3:53
10.	"Paddy on the Railway"	traditional	3:16
11.	"Waxies' Dargle"	traditional	2:47
12.	"Irishman in America"	Logan	5:01

== Charts ==
Chart (2008)	Peak position
Danish Albums (Hitlisten)	10
Norwegian Albums (VG-lista)	20
Swedish Albums (Sverigetopplistan)	24
