= Auto Da Fé (band) =

- Origin: Ireland (formed in the Netherlands)
- Genres: New wave
- Years active: 1980–1986
- Labels: Hux, ADF, Rewind, Red Hot, Stoic, Spartan, GMN, RTÉ
- Past members: Gay Woods; Trevor Knight; Mark Megaray (aka Hogan) (ex-Radiators); Robbie Brennan; Wout Pennings; Carel van Rijn; Theo Wanders; Howard Wilson; John Stokes; Earl Gill Jr. Garvan Gallagher; Tom Jamieson; Finn Corrigan; Willie Demange; Peter Connolly

Auto Da Fé were an Irish new wave musical group formed in the Netherlands in 1980 (but mainly active in Ireland) by former Steeleye Span singer Gay Woods and Trevor Knight. The band's sound incorporated keyboards and electronics. Woods stated "It was the happiest musical time I ever had so far. I learned so much. I was ridding myself of a lot of things that stifled me. It was so liberating for me to stand up and not be a "folky" anymore. It was the easiest thing in the world because I had yearned for so long to do that music. I still love the songs I wrote at the time".

The band released a string of singles between 1982 and 1985, including "November November", "Bad Experience", and "Man of Mine" (the latter featuring Midge Ure on guitar), and one studio album, Tatitum (based around "Jacques Tati and the art of humming"). They also released a compilation of singles tracks, and had a CD of live performances recorded by the BBC in 1983 for their In Concert programme, Songs For Echo, released in 2001, the second performance featuring Phil Lynott on bass and backing vocals. Lynott also produced some of Auto Da Fé's early recordings.

The band split up in 1986. Woods later rejoined Steeleye Span. Knight went on to work as a theatre sound designer.

== Discography ==
=== Albums ===
- 5 Singles and 1 Smoked Cod (1984) Stoic (compilation of singles tracks)
- Tatitum (1985) Spartan
- Songs for Echo (2001) Hux (live 1983 recordings)

=== Singles and EPs ===
- "November November" (1982) ADF/(1983) Rewind
- "Bad Experience" (1982) ADF/Rewind
- "Man of Mine" (1983) Rewind
- "Something's Gotten Hold of My Heart" (1984) Red Hot/Rewind (#24 in Ireland)
- "Credo Credo" (1984) Red Hot
- "All Is Yellow Hot Hot Hot" (1985) Spartan (#27 in Ireland)
- "Magic Moments" (1985) Spartan
- Gazette EP (1988) GMN
