= We All Need Love (album) =

Studio album by Johnny Logan
- Released: October 2003
- Recorded: Puk Recording Studios, Denmark
- Genre: pop
- Length: 61:05
- Label: Scanbox Entertainment
- Producer: Søren Madsen

Johnny Logan chronology
Save This Christmas for Me (2001)	We All Need Love (2003)	The Irish Connection (2007)

Singles from We All Need Love
- 1. "We All Need Love" Released: 2003

We All Need Love is the eleventh studio album by Australian-born Irish singer and composer Johnny Logan, released in Europe in October 2003, with a bonus DVD recorded live on his 2003 European Tour. The album charted in Denmark, Norway and Sweden.

== Track listing ==
Scanbox CD82203
No.	Title	Writer(s)	Length
1.	"We All Need Love"	Johnny Logan	3:56
2.	"Favorite Waste of Time"	Marshall Crenshaw	3:31
3.	"On the Other Side of Midnight"	Logan	4:23
4.	"Here I Go Again"	Logan	3:59
5.	"All Out of Love"	Clive Davis, Graham Russell	3:41
6.	"Don't Go"	Logan	3:52
7.	"Waterfalls"	Logan	4:13
8.	"Cry"	Logan	3:46
9.	"Lean on Me"	Bill Withers	3:42
10.	"I Don't Mind the Rain"	Logan	4:32
11.	"Mighty Quinn"	Bob Dylan	3:30
12.	"What You Are to Me"		5:11
13.	"Caravan of Love"	Ernie Isley, Chris Jasper, Marvin Isley	4:28
14.	"Leap of Faith"	Logan	3:13
15.	"Get Here If You Can"	Brenda Russell	4:37

Bonus Live DVD
No.	Title	Writer(s)	Length
1.	"What's Another Year"	Shay Healy
2.	"Favourite Waste of Time"	Crenshaw
3.	"Taking All the Blame"	Niels Pors, R. Anderson, Thomas Windfeld
4.	"Why Me?"	Logan
5.	"One"
6.	"Interview"

== Charts ==
Chart (2003)	Peak position
Danish Albums (Hitlisten)	20
Norwegian Albums (VG-lista)	36
Swedish Albums (Sverigetopplistan)	39
