= Peace and Love (The Pogues album) =

Studio album by The Pogues
- Released: 17 July 1989
- Studios: RAK, London; Ealing Studios, London
- Genre: Celtic rock
- Length: 44:54
- Label: Island
- Producer: Steve Lillywhite

The Pogues chronology
If I Should Fall from Grace with God (1988)	Peace and Love (1989)	Hell's Ditch (1990)

Singles from Peace and Love
- 1. "Misty Morning, Albert Bridge" Released: June 1989; 2. "White City" Released: August 1989; 3. "Lorelei" Released: 1989 (Canada)

Peace and Love is the fourth studio album by the Pogues, released in July 1989.

== Overview ==
Peace and Love continued the band's gradual departure from traditional Irish music. It noticeably opens with a heavily jazz-influenced track. Also, several of the songs are inspired by the city in which the Pogues were founded, London ("White City", "Misty Morning, Albert Bridge", "London You're a Lady"), as opposed to Ireland, from which they had usually drawn inspiration. Nevertheless, several notable Irish personages are mentioned, including Ned of the Hill, Christy Brown, whose book Down All The Days appears as a song title, and Napper Tandy, mentioned in the first line of "Boat Train", which was adapted from a line in the Irish rebel song "The Wearing of the Green". Likewise the MacGowan song "Cotton Fields" draws on the Lead Belly song of the same name.

== Critical reception ==
Professional ratings
Review scores
Source	Rating
AllMusic	4/5 stars
Robert Christgau	B

Mark Deming of AllMusic said that Peace and Love "isn't as good as the two Pogues albums that preceded it", but felt that "it does make clear that MacGowan was hardly the only talented songwriter in the band". Robert Christgau, on the other hand, believed that "Shane MacGowan will remain the only Pogue in the down-and-out hall of fame".

Spin said, "Shane's bawl has never seethed with such an ominous sense of repressed rage. You can't figure out the words, and you don't need to. Shane manages to get less self-conscious, more morbid with every album. Another relic of a provisional culture stripped of reference points long enough to smoosh punk and Celtic folk together."

== Track listing ==
=== Standard edition ===
Peace and Love track listing
No.	Title	Writer(s)	Lead vocals	Length
1.	"Gridlock"	Jem Finer, Andrew Ranken		3:33
2.	"White City"	Shane MacGowan	MacGowan	2:31
3.	"Young Ned of the Hill"	Terry Woods, Ron Kavana	Woods	2:45
4.	"Misty Morning, Albert Bridge"	Finer	MacGowan	3:01
5.	"Cotton Fields"	MacGowan	Ranken, MacGowan	2:51
6.	"Blue Heaven"	Phil Chevron, Darryl Hunt	Chevron, Hunt	3:36
7.	"Down All the Days"	MacGowan	MacGowan, Chevron	3:45
8.	"USA"	MacGowan	MacGowan, Ranken	4:52
9.	"Lorelei"	Chevron	Chevron	3:33
10.	"Gartloney Rats"	Woods	Woods	2:32
11.	"Boat Train"	MacGowan	MacGowan, Spider Stacy	2:40
12.	"Tombstone"	Finer	Woods	2:57
13.	"Night Train to Lorca"	Finer	MacGowan, Chevron	3:29
14.	"London You're a Lady"	MacGowan	MacGowan	2:56
Total length:				44:54

=== Bonus tracks (2005 reissue) ===
No.	Title	Writer(s)	Lead vocals	Length
1.	"Star of the County Down" (B-side to "White City" 12")	Traditional	Ranken	2:33
2.	"The Limerick Rake" (B-side to "Yeah Yeah Yeah Yeah Yeah")	Traditional	MacGowan	3:12
3.	"Train of Love" (B-side to "Misty Morning, Albert Bridge" CD single)	Finer	Finer, Chevron, Hunt	3:08
4.	"Everyman Is a King" (B-side to "White City")	Woods, Kavana	Woods	3:54
5.	"Yeah Yeah Yeah Yeah Yeah" (A-side single)	MacGowan	MacGowan	3:19
6.	"Honky Tonk Women" (B-side to "Yeah Yeah Yeah Yeah Yeah" 12")	Mick Jagger, Keith Richards	Stacy	2:55

== Charts ==
=== Weekly charts ===
Weekly chart performance for Peace And Love
Chart (1989)	Peak position
Australian Albums (ARIA)	61
UK Albums (Official Charts)	5
Canada Top Albums/CDs (RPM)	58
German Albums (Offizielle Top 100)	13
Dutch Albums (Album Top 100)	53
Swiss Albums (Schweizer Hitparade)	17
Swedish Albums (Sverigetopplistan)	7
Norwegian Albums (VG-lista)	13
New Zealand Albums (RMNZ)	32

== Certifications ==
Region	Certification	Certified units/sales
United Kingdom (BPI)	Gold	100,000^{^}
^{^} Shipments figures based on certification alone.

== Personnel ==
=== The Pogues ===
- Shane MacGowan – vocals
- Jem Finer – banjo
- Spider Stacy – tin whistle, vocals
- James Fearnley – accordion
- Andrew Ranken – drums
- Terry Woods – cittern, mandolin, vocals
- Philip Chevron – guitar, vocals
- Darryl Hunt – bass guitar

=== Additional musicians ===
Credits are adapted from the album liner notes, except where noted.

- Peadar O'Riada – string arrangement on "London You're a Lady"
- Fiachra Trench – string and brass arrangement on "Misty Morning, Albert Bridge"
- Paul Taylor – brass arrangement on "Blue Heaven" and "Night Train to Lorca"
- Brian Clarke – alto saxophone
- Joey Cashman – tenor saxophone
- Eli Thompson – trumpet
- Paul Taylor – trombone
- Rick Trevan – tenor saxophone on "Gridlock"
- Gasper Lawal – percussion on "Blue Heaven" and "Tombstone"
- Kirsty MacColl – backup vocals on "Lorelei"
- John Sheahan – fiddle on "The Limerick Rake"

=== Technical ===
- Steve Lillywhite – producer
- Chris Dickie – engineer
- Nick Lacey – assistant engineer
- Ryan Art – design
- Philip Hardaker – inner sleeve montage
- Steve Pyke – band photography
- David Jordan – producer on "Star of the County Down"
- Paul Scully – producer on "Star of the County Down"

== Additional information ==
- The album carried a dedication to "the memory of the 95 people who died at Hillsborough Football Ground". The reason for this apparent anomaly is that at the time of the album's release the disaster's eventual 96th victim Tony Bland was still being kept alive on life support at Airedale General Hospital in Keighley, West Yorkshire where he would eventually die on 3 March 1993.
- The boxer on the cover has six fingers on his right hand. The boxer was Hugh Cameron, bronze medal winner at the 1938 British Empire Games (later changed to the Commonwealth Games). The fifth finger was added by sleeve designer, Simon Ryan, to accommodate the word "PEACE".
- The song "Down All The Days" was later covered by noise rock band Steel Pole Bath Tub on their album The Miracle of Sound in Motion.
- The song "Gridlock" is used as the introduction music on The Davey Mac Sports Program.
