= Trevor Knight (Canadian football) =

American football player (born 1995)

No. 18
- Position: Quarterback

Personal information
- Born: December 13, 1995 (age 30); Amherst, New Hampshire, U.S.
- Listed height: 6 ft 0 in (1.83 m)
- Listed weight: 188 lb (85 kg)

Career information
- High school: South (Nashua, New Hampshire)
- College: New Hampshire (2014–2018)
- NFL draft: 2019: undrafted

Career history
- Winnipeg Blue Bombers (2019)

Awards and highlights
- Grey Cup champion (2019); Third-team All-CAA (2017)
- Stats at CFL.ca

Trevor Knight (born December 13, 1995) is an American former professional football quarterback who played for the Winnipeg Blue Bombers of the Canadian Football League (CFL). He played high school football at Nashua High School South in Nashua, New Hampshire, where he was named the New Hampshire Player of the Year as a senior. He played college football for the New Hampshire Wildcats and won the 2017 New England Football Writers Division I Season Gold Helmet Award, given to the Division I FBS or FCS player of the year in New England. After going unselected in the 2019 NFL draft, Knight played one year in the CFL where he was a member of the 107th Grey Cup-winning Blue Bombers. He has also worked as a private quarterbacks coach and, in 2024, became the head football coach at Dracut High School.

== Early life ==
Trevor Knight was born on December 13, 1995, in Amherst, New Hampshire. He played high school football at Nashua High School South in Nashua, New Hampshire, as a two-way player. He was a two-year team captain. As a senior, Knight threw for 1,800 yards, 19 touchdowns, and two interceptions while also rushing for 1,533 yards and 19 touchdowns. On defense, Knight had 36 tackles and four interceptions. He led Nashua South to a 9–2 record and the Division I playoffs. For his performance during his senior season, he was named the New Hampshire Player of the Year by various selectors, including USA Today, ESPN, and Gatorade. He was also a member of Nashua South's track team and the starting point guard in basketball.

== College career ==
Knight played college football for the New Hampshire Wildcats of the University of New Hampshire from 2015 to 2018. He redshirted the 2014 season. He played in six games in 2015 as a backup to Sean Goldrich, completing ten of 19 passes for 124 yards, one touchdown, and one interception while carrying the ball 18 times for 52 yards and one touchdown. During the 2016 offseason, Knight competed with senior Adam Riese for the team's starting quarterback job. Knight was named the starter before the beginning of the regular season. He played in 12 out of 13 games in 2016 but split time with Riese during some of them. Knight finished the 2016 season with 12 starts, 179 completions, 319 pass attempts, a 56.11 completion percentage, 1,714 passing yards, 14 passing touchdowns, ten interceptions, 138 carries, 396 rushing yards, and four rushing touchdowns. The 2016 Wildcats finished the year with an 8–5 overall record, losing in the second round of the FCS playoffs.

Knight started all 14 games in 2017, completing 291 of 471 passes (61.78%) for 3,433 yards, 26 touchdowns, and ten interceptions while rushing 146 times for 162 yards and one touchdown. His 471 pass attempts were the most in school history and his 3,433 passing yards were the second most. The 2017 Wildcats went 9–5 overall, with a loss in the FCS quarterfinals. Knight earned third-team All-Colonial Athletic Association honors for his performance during the 2017 season. He was also the winner of the 2017 New England Football Writers Division I Season Gold Helmet Award, given to the Division I FBS or FCS player of the year in New England. Knight appeared in eight games, all starts, as a redshirt senior in 2018. He missed some time after injuring his shoulder in the season opener. Knight finished the 2018 season with 110 completions on 196 attempts (56.12%) for 1,074 yards, seven touchdowns, and five interceptions. He also rushed 41 times for 84 yards and four touchdowns.

Knight ended his college career with totals of 40 games played, 34 games started, 590 completions, 1,005 passing attempts, a 58.71 completion percentage, 6,345 passing yards, 48 passing touchdowns, 26 interceptions, 343 carries, 694 rushing yards, and ten rushing touchdowns. His completion total was the fifth most in school history while his passing yardage total was the sixth most. He majored in political science and criminal justice at New Hampshire.

== Professional career ==
Knight participated in the College Gridiron Showcase as a wide receiver, and the Oakland Raiders interviewed him as an athlete. Knight went unselected in the 2019 NFL draft. On August 28, 2019, it was reported that he had signed with the Blue Stars de Marseille of The Ligue Elite De Football Americain in France for the 2020 season as a quarterback, but he did not join the team due to signing in the Canadian Football League (CFL). On September 24, 2019, Knight was signed to the practice roster of the Winnipeg Blue Bombers of the CFL. After quarterback Chris Streveler was placed on injured reserve, Knight was promoted to the active roster on October 24. He dressed in one game for Winnipeg but did not record any statistics. Knight was released on November 8, but signed back to the team's practice roster the next day. On November 24, 2019, the Blue Bombers won the 107th Grey Cup against the Hamilton Tiger-Cats by a score of 33–12. Knight became a free agent after the 2019 season.

== Personal life ==
Knight began working as a private quarterbacks coach after going undrafted in the NFL draft. He later created his own business called TK QB Academy LLC. After spending several years as an assistant football coach at Merrimack High School and later Nashua South, Knight became the head football coach at Dracut High School in 2024.
