= In London (Johnny Logan album) =

Studio album by Johnny Logan
- Released: 1979
- Genre: Pop
- Label: Release Records
- Producer: Robert Danova (all tracks), Ken Gibson (tracks 1–10), Liam Hurley (track 11)

Johnny Logan chronology
| In London (1979) | What's Another Year (1980) |

Singles from In London
- 1. "No, I Don't Want to Fall in Love" Released: 1978; 2. "Living for Love" Released: 1978; 3. "Angela" Released: 1979; 4. "In London/Sad Little Women" Released: June 1980

In London is the debut studio album by Australian-born Irish singer and composer Johnny Logan. In 1979, Readers of the Connaught Telegraph in Ireland voted Johnny Logan as Best New Male Artist. The album was released a year before he went on to win the 1980 Eurovision Song Contest. Following that, "In London/Sad Little Women" was released internationally and charted in Germany and Belgium.

== Track listing ==
LP/Cassette

Side A
| No. | Title | Writer(s) | Length |
|---|---|---|---|
| 1. | "In London" | Shona Laing, Roberto Danova | 3:50 |
| 2. | "No I Don't Want to Fall In Love" | S. Laing, R. Danova |
| 3. | "Hey Kid" | S. Liang, R. Danova |
| 4. | "I Want to Go to Brazil" | G. Blair, R. Danova |
| 5. | "Living for Loving" | G. Blair, R. Danova |

Side B
| No. | Title | Writer(s) | Length |
|---|---|---|---|
| 1. | "Please Please Please" | K. Gibson, Martyn |
| 2. | "Lonely Tonight" | K. Gibson, R. Danova |
| 3. | "Man With the Accordion" | S. Liang, R. Danova |
| 4. | "Sad Little Woman" | S. Liang, R. Danova | 3:30 |
| 5. | "Honesty" | G. Blair |
| 6. | "Angelina" | L. Hurley, V. Kearney |
