= The Irish Connection 2 =

Studio album by Johnny Logan
- Released: December 2012
- Recorded: February–April 2012
- Studio: MillFactory, Denmark
- Genre: pop; folk; world
- Label: Labrador Music
- Producer: Boe Larsen

Johnny Logan chronology
| Nature of Love (2010) | The Irish Connection 2 (2012) | It Is What It Is (2017) |

The Irish Connection 2 is the fifteenth studio album by Australian-born Irish singer and composer Johnny Logan. The album was released in December 2012 and charted in Denmark and Norway. The album is the "sister" album of Logan's 2007 release The Irish Connection.

== Track listing ==
Labrador Music – LM201332552
| No. | Title | Writer(s) | Length |
|---|---|---|---|
| 1. | "Lanigan's Ball" | traditional | 4:38 |
| 2. | "Galway Girl" | Steve Earle | 2:56 |
| 3. | "The Irish Soul" | Boe Larsen, Johnny logan | 3:51 |
| 4. | "Body of An American" | Shane MacGowan | 3:30 |
| 5. | "Irish Heartbeat" | Van Morrison | 3:55 |
| 6. | "The Holy Ground" | traditional | 4:06 |
| 7. | "Dearg Doom" | Barry Devlin, Charles O'Connor, Eamon Carr, Jim Lockhart, John Fean | 3:26 |
| 8. | "Ellen's Song" | Logan | 5:20 |
| 9. | "Fairytale of New York" | Jem Finer, MacGowan | 4:24 |
| 10. | "Independent Man" | Logan | 3:25 |
| 11. | "She Moved Through the Fair" | traditional | 3:24 |
| 12. | "Matty Groves" | traditional | 4:08 |
| 13. | "The Old Triangle" | Brendan Behan | 3:27 |

== Charts ==
| Chart (2013) | Peak position |
|---|---|
| Danish Albums (Hitlisten) | 17 |
| Norwegian Albums (VG-lista) | 32 |
