= Terry Woods =

Irish musician (born 1947)

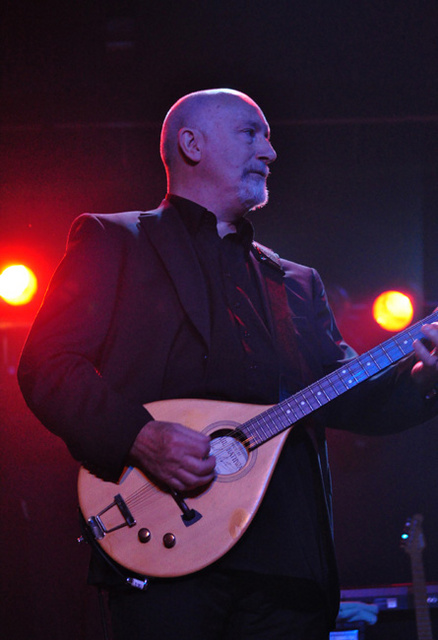
- Terry Woods at the Milk Club in Moscow, Russia on 29 August 2010, with The Pogues

Background information
- Born: Terence Woods; 4 December 1947 (age 78); Dublin, Ireland
- Genres: Folk; folk rock; Celtic rock; Celtic punk
- Occupations: Musician; singer; songwriter; bandleader
- Instruments: Vocals; mandolin; cittern; guitar; banjo; concertina
- Years active: 1963–present

Terence Woods (born 4 December 1947) is an Irish folk musician, singer, and multi-instrumentalist.

He is known for his membership in such folk and folk-rock groups as the Pogues, Steeleye Span, Sweeney's Men, the Bucks, Dr. Strangely Strange and the short-lived Orphanage, with Phil Lynott. Woods also played with his wife Gay, billed initially as the Woods Band and later as Gay and Terry Woods.

Woods is most associated with the mandolin and cittern, but per his recorded worth with The Pogues also plays acoustic and electric guitars, mandola, five-string banjo and concertina.

== Career ==
Woods was once a member of the band Steeleye Span.

As a member of the Pogues, he was known for playing instruments including the mandolin and the concertina. He wrote and sang the vocals for the first section of their song "Streets of Sorrow/Birmingham Six", with vocalist Shane MacGowan writing and singing the second section.

== Discography ==
=== Albums ===
==== With Sweeney's Men ====
- Sweeney's Men
- The Tracks of Sweeney
- Andy Irvine/70th Birthday Concert at Vicar St 2012

==== With Steeleye Span ====
- Hark! The Village Wait

==== With the Woods Band ====
- The Woods Band
- Music From The Four Corners of Hell (without Gay Woods)

==== As Gay & Terry Woods ====
- Backwoods
- The Time Is Right
- Renowned
- Tender Hooks
- In Concert (compilation of 1976 & 1978 BBC sessions)

==== With the Pogues ====
- Poguetry in Motion (EP)
- If I Should Fall From Grace With God
- Peace and Love
- Hell's Ditch
- Waiting for Herb

==== With the Bucks ====
- Dancin' To The Ceili Band

==== With Ron Kavana ====
- Home Fire

=== Other releases ===
- 1968 Waxie's Dargle / Old Woman In Cotton, 7" single, Sweeney's Men (Pye 7N 17459)
- 1981 Tennessee Stud / I Don't Know About Love, 7" single, Terry Woods (with Phil Lynott)
- 1989 Misty Morning Albert Bridge / Cotton Fields / Young Ned of the Hill (Dub Version), 7" and 12" single (also cassette and cd), The Pogues
- 1989 White City / Everyman Is A King 7" single (also cassette and cd), The Pogues

== Filmography ==
- Andy Irvine/70th Birthday Concert at Vicar St 2012 (2014), DVD
