= The Irish Connection (Johnny Logan album) =

Studio album by Johnny Logan and Friends
- Released: April 2007
- Recorded: Dreamland Studios, Nibe, Denmark
- Genre: pop; folk; world
- Length: 60:07
- Label: My Way Music
- Producer: H.C. Röder, Johnny Logan

Johnny Logan albums chronology
We All Need Love (2003)	The Irish Connection (2007)	Irishman in America (2008)

The Irish Connection is the twelfth studio album by Australian-born Irish singer and composer Johnny Logan; credited to himself and Friends. The album was released in April 2007. The album peaked at number one in Norway and Sweden.

== Track listing ==
My Way Music – (M 20138-2)
No.	Title	Writer(s)	Length
1.	"The Wild Rover"	traditional	2:49
2.	"The Fields of Athenry"	Pete St. John	4:54
3.	"Dirty Old Town"	Ewan MacColl	3:57
4.	"Molly Malone"	traditional	3:06
5.	"On Raglan Road"	Patrick Kavanagh	4:25
6.	"The Irish Rover"	traditional	3:46
7.	"The Black Velvet Band"	traditional	5:28
8.	"And the Band Played Waltzing Matilda"	Eric Bogle	7:09
9.	"The Raggle Taggle Gypsy"	traditional	4:21
10.	"Follow Me up to Carlow"	traditional	3:49
11.	"Tim Finnegan's Wake"	traditional	2:37
12.	"Whiskey in the Jar"	traditional	4:08
13.	"Spancil Hill"	Michael Considine	3:53
14.	"The Town I Loved So Well"	Phil Coulter	5:45

== Charts ==
Chart (2007–08)	Peak position
Danish Albums (Hitlisten)	3
German Albums (Offizielle Top 100)	71
Norwegian Albums (VG-lista)	1
Swedish Albums (Sverigetopplistan)	1
Swiss Albums (Schweizer Hitparade)	73

== Certifications ==
Region	Certification	Certified units/sales
Denmark (IFPI Danmark)	Platinum	30,000^{^}
Norway (IFPI Norway)	2× Platinum	80,000^{*}
Sweden (GLF)	Gold	20,000^{^}
^{*} Sales figures based on certification alone.^{^} Shipments figures based on certification alone.

== See also ==
- List of number-one singles and albums in Sweden
- List of number-one albums in Norway
