= Hold Me Now (Johnny Logan song) =

1987 song by Johnny Logan

Single by Johnny Logan

from the album Hold Me Now
- B-side: "Living a Lie"
- Released: 1987
- Genre: Pop
- Length: 3:00
- Label: Epic
- Songwriter: Seán Sherrard
- Producer: Bill Whelan

Johnny Logan singles chronology
"Sara Smile" (1986)	"Hold Me Now" (1987)	"I'm Not in Love" (1987)

Eurovision Song Contest 1987 entry
- Country: Ireland
- Artist: Seán Sherrard
- As: Johnny Logan
- Language: English
- Composer: Seán Sherrard
- Lyricist: Seán Sherrard
- Conductor: Noel Kelehan

Finals performance
- Final result: 1st
- Final points: 172

Entry chronology
- ◄ "You Can Count on Me" (1986)
- "Take Him Home" (1988) ►

Official performance video
- "Hold Me Now" on YouTube

"Hold Me Now" is a song written and recorded by Irish singer-songwriter Johnny Logan. It represented Ireland in the Eurovision Song Contest 1987 held in Brussels, resulting in his second win at the contest, as well as the country's third victory. It reached #1 in Ireland, but reached #2 in UK, Norway, Sweden, Germany, held off the top spot in UK, Norway and Sweden by Whitney Houston's smash single "I Wanna Dance With Somebody (Who Loves Me)," and in Germany where the song was held off by Madonna's major hit single "La Isla Bonita" the first week then "I Wanna Dance With Somebody (Who Loves Me)" for the further two weeks.

== Background ==
=== Conception ===
"Hold Me Now" was written, composed, and recorded by Johnny Logan. Lyrically, It is a ballad sung from the point of view of a man whose love interest is leaving him for someone else ("from now on you'll be with someone else instead of me"). The singer pleads with his girlfriend to "touch, touch [him] the way you used to do" in order to leave him with good memories of their relationship, even as they "fill this memory / for the last time". The chorus then tells the girl "don't say a word", as they prepare to part. Despite the sad nature of the parting, the singer says "I will know / though we're apart / we'll always be together", which implies some sort of optimism on his part. The music is a typical power ballad, with the final chorus being introduced by a choir of backing singers –Joan Lea, Karen Black, and Alain Pentony–.

=== Eurovision ===
Logan had previously won the Eurovision Song Contest with "What's Another Year" in the 1980 contest and had written "Terminal 3" for Linda Martin, placing second in the 1984 contest, both representing Ireland.

On 8 March 1987, "Hold Me Now" performed by him competed in the national selection organised by Raidió Teilifís Éireann (RTÉ) to select its song and performer for the 32nd edition of the Eurovision Song Contest. The song won the competition so it became the Irish entrant –and Logan the performer– for Eurovision.

On 9 May, the Eurovision Song Contest was held at the Centenary Palace in Brussels hosted by the Radio-télévision belge de la Communauté française (RTBF), and broadcast live throughout the continent. Logan performed "Hold Me Now" twentieth on the evening, following Denmark's "En lille melodi" by Anne-Cathrine Herdorf & Bandjo and preceding Yugoslavia's "Ja sam za ples" by Novi Fosili. Noel Kelehan conducted the event's live orchestra in the performance of the Irish entry.

At the close of voting, it had received 172 points, placing first in a field of twenty-two, winning the contest. After Logan, had been proclaimed the winner with this song, he was overcome with emotion during the reprise and was unable to reach the high notes in this part of the song. As he had when he won in 1980 with "What's Another Year", he shouted "I still love you, Ireland". It was succeeded as winner in 1988 "Ne partez pas sans moi" sung by Céline Dion representing Switzerland. It was succeeded as Irish representative at the 1988 contest by "Take Him Home" sung by Jump The Gun.

=== Aftermath ===
Logan would go on to write the winner song of the 1992 contest, "Why Me?" performed by Linda Martin.

"Hold Me Now" is regarded as one of the high points of the contest history, it was one of fourteen songs chosen by Eurovision fans and a European Broadcasting Union (EBU) reference group, from among the 992 songs that had ever participated in the contest, to participate in the fiftieth anniversary competition Congratulations: 50 Years of the Eurovision Song Contest held on 22 October 2005 in Copenhagen, where it was voted the third-best song in Eurovision history behind "Waterloo" and "Nel blu dipinto di blu". On 31 March 2015, in the Eurovision sixtieth anniversary concert Eurovision Song Contest's Greatest Hits held in London, Logan performed the song as part of a medley with "Why Me?" and "What's Another Year".

== Later versions ==
=== 2001 version ===
"Hold Me Now 2001"

Single by Johnny Logan

from the album Reach for Me
- B-side: "Hold Me Now 2001" (instrumental)
- Released: 2001
- Genre: Pop
- Length: 3:35
- Label: Epic
- Songwriter: Johnny Logan

Johnny Logan singles chronology
"Music" (2000)	"Hold Me Now 2001" (2001)	"No One Makes Love Like You" (2001)

In 2001, Logan released the album Reach for Me, with the first two tracks being revamped versions of his Eurovision winning songs which are titled in the album as "What's Another Year 2001" and "Hold Me Now 2001" in a revamped up-beat version. "Hold Me Now" from the album had a limited chart success in Denmark where it made it to number ine on the Hitlisten chart. It also made it to number 54 in Swedish Hitlistan Singles Chart.

Track listing

1. "Hold Me Now 2001" (radio edit) (3:33)
2. "Hold Me Now 2001" (instrumental) (3:33)

=== 2010 version ===
A decade later, Johnny Logan recorded yet a new version of both winning songs now titled "What's Another Year 2010" and "Hold Me Now 2010" in his studio album Nature of Love without releasing either as a single.

== Charts ==
=== Weekly charts ===
"Hold Me Now"
Chart (1987)	Peak position
Australia (Australian Music Report)	4
Austria (Ö3 Austria Top 40)	4
Belgium (Ultratop 50 Flanders)	1
Denmark (IFPI)	4
European Hot 100 Singles (Music & Media)	2
Finland (Suomen virallinen lista)	4
Greece (IFPI)	2
Ireland (IRMA)	1
Netherlands (Dutch Top 40)	3
Netherlands (Single Top 100)	3
Norway (VG-lista)	2
Sweden (Sverigetopplistan)	2
Switzerland (Schweizer Hitparade)	6
UK Singles (Official Charts)	2
West Germany (GfK)	2

"Hold Me Now" (2001 version)
Chart (2001)	Peak position
Denmark (Tracklisten)	9
Sweden (Sverigetopplistan)	54

=== Year-end charts ===
"Hold Me Now"
Chart (1987)	Position
Australia (Australian Music Report)	48
Austria (Ö3 Austria Top 40)	28
Belgium (Ultratop)	17
European Hot 100 Singles (Music & Media)	43
Netherlands (Dutch Top 40)	41
Netherlands (Single Top 100)	35
UK Singles (OCC)	19
West Germany (Media Control)	34

=== Certifications ===
Certifications and sales for "Hold Me Now"
Region	Certification	Certified units/sales
Belgium (BRMA)	Gold	25,000^{*}
Denmark (IFPI Danmark)	Gold	45,000^{‡}
^{*} Sales figures based on certification alone.^{‡} Sales+streaming figures based on certification alone.

== Legacy ==
The song is usually sung by Bohemians at home matches in Dalymount Park.

=== Covers ===
The song has been covered by several performers, including a reggae version by Tanya Stephens. It has also been updated by Belgian rapper Kaye Styles as "Don't Cry". This cover also features Logan performing the chorus of the song at a slightly faster tempo than the traditional version. The late Macedonian superstar Toše Proeski covered this song during his concerts. The Finnish rock band Lordi covered the song in collaboration with Noora Louhimo.

=== McDonald's advertising ===
The song was also used in an Irish advertising campaign launched by McDonald's toward the end of 2007. These ads feature Logan bursting into the room with a McDonald's bag in an effort to cheer a series of teens in humorous predicaments. Logan interrupts his singing to pose the question "Twisty Fries?" (among other products offered by McDonald's).

Preceded by "J'aime la vie" by Sandra Kim	Eurovision Song Contest winners 1987	Succeeded by "Ne partez pas sans moi" by Celine Dion
