= Gay Woods =

Irish singer (born 1948)

- Born: Gabriel Corcoran; 18 September 1948 (age 78); Dublin, Ireland
- Genre: British folk rock
- Occupations: Musician; songwriter
- Instruments: Vocals; autoharp; dulcimer; concertina; bodhran
- Years active: 1963–present
- Formerly of: Steeleye Span; The Woods Band; Dr. Strangely Strange; Gay & Terry Woods; Auto Da Fé
- Website: http://gaywoods.homestead.com/

Gay Woods (born 18 September 1948) is an Irish singer. She was one of the original members of Steeleye Span.

== Early years ==
Gabriel Corcoran was born in Dublin, a neighbour of her future husband Terry Woods. Her elder brothers shared Woods' love of hillbilly music and blues. Corcoran and Woods performed together in 1963 at Dublin's Neptune Rowing club and got married in May 1968. Performing as a duo, they sang Carter Family songs and occasionally Irish songs. Terry Woods became a member of Sweeney's Men, who played English and American folk music, plus their own compositions. That summer the band performed at Cambridge Folk Festival. Gay Woods was not in the band. The following summer, the couple went to Keele folk festival where Woods met up with Ashley Hutchings who was then still with Fairport Convention. Terry Woods and Hutchings had an instant rapport.

== Steeleye Span, 1969–1970 ==
The first tentative rehearsal for the new band which was to become Steeleye Span was early in November 1969. Johnny Moynihan, the Woods, Andy Irvine and Hutchings met at the Prince of Wales pub in Highgate. Next day Moynihan said he would not be joining Steeleye due to personal differences with Terry Woods. Irvine also dropped out, resuming a solo career prior to meeting Dónal Lunny, with whom he later formed a duo. To replace them, Hutchings invited Bob and Carole Pegg, then the Dransfield brothers, and finally Tim Hart and Maddy Prior, who accepted. Hutchings' departure from Fairport Convention was revealed in NME on 22 November 1969.

Gay Woods felt very neglected at this time, as Hart and Prior were still gigging as a duo, and she was the breadwinner after Sweeney's Men broke up in November. A friend of Terry Woods offered the new band a house in Winterbourne Stoke for rehearsals. Photographs taken that winter in the Wiltshire village appear on some editions of the liner notes of the album Hark! The Village Wait. In March 1970 there was a BBC radio session of the material, and they recorded it in April. The studio time was fraught, with disharmony evident between the two couples. The Woodses went to Nottingham immediately after the recording, and received a phone call a week later to say they had been replaced by Martin Carthy. This rankled so much with Terry that he refused to appear in the grand reunion of Steeleye Span, The Journey, in 1995.

== 1970–1988 ==
In the summer of 1970, Gay and Terry Woods joined Dr. Strangely Strange, performing with the group in the Netherlands and Germany before it disbanded shortly afterwards. Terry Woods returned to Ireland, where he recruited Ed Deane and Pat Nash for a new project, The Woods Band. The group recorded its only album in 1971, issued by Greenwich Records in a luxury gatefold sleeve embossed with gold Celtic designs. Although the album received good reviews, sales were poor, and the band's situation worsened when the Greenwich label collapsed — the news reached them while they were on tour with Greenslade..

The Woods Band reduced to a duo, Terry and Gay recorded four albums and a single between 1975 and 1978, issued on Mulligan Records. Their songs were mostly self-composed, with accompaniment on dulcimer, banjo and both acoustic and electric guitars. After Gay suffered a stillbirth and then a miscarriage in 1979, she returned to working as a typist. In 1980, the couple approached Garvan Gallagher and Trevor Knight (then of the group Metropolis) about contributing to a new Woods Band demo, but after the sessions Gay broke up with Terry and formed a new group, Auto Da Fe, with Knight and three Dutch musicians: Theo Wanders, Carel van Rijn and Wout Pennings. Stylistically aligned with the New Romantic movement, Auto Da Fe released eight singles, a compilation album and the studio album Tatitum; their singles received strong airplay in Ireland, making their live concerts profitable. Phil Lynott and Midge Ure both contributed session work to the group.

In 1987, Gay Woods gave birth to a child by Trevor Knight.

== Steeleye Span, 1995–2001 ==
In 1994 she was asked to rejoin Steeleye Span. The 1996 album, Time features her and Maddy Prior on vocals. Prior left the band and Woods was the main vocalist for the next few years. After recording three albums plus a concert tour with them, she left them over financial issues.

She later studied for a degree in psychology at the University of Essex.

== Discography ==
Steeleye Span :

- Hark! The Village Wait (1970)
- Time (1996)
- Horkstow Grange (1998)
- The Journey (live) (1999)
- Bedlam Born (2000)

The Woods Band :

- The Woods Band (1971)

Gay and Terry Woods :

- Backwoods (1975)
- The Time Is Right (1976)
- Renowned (1976)
- Tenderhooks (1978)
- In Concert (1995)
- Lake Songs From Red Water: The Best of Gay & Terry Woods (20-track compilation from their first three albums) (2003)

Auto Da Fé :

- 5 Singles & 1 Smoked Cod (1984) EP
- Tatitum (1985) LP
