= What's Another Year =

1980 song by Johnny Logan

Single by Johnny Logan

from the album What's Another Year
- B-side: "One Night Stand"
- Released: April 1980
- Genre: Pop
- Length: 3:08
- Label: Release Records; Epic
- Songwriter: Shay Healy
- Producers: Bill Whelan; Dave Pennefather

Johnny Logan singles chronology
"Angela" (1979)	"What's Another Year" (1980)	"In London" (1980)

Eurovision Song Contest 1980 entry
- Country: Ireland
- Artist: Seán Sherrard
- As: Johnny Logan
- Language: English
- Composer: Shay Healy
- Lyricist: Shay Healy
- Conductor: Noel Kelehan

Finals performance
- Final result: 1st
- Final points: 143

Entry chronology
- ◄ "Happy Man" (1979)
- "Horoscopes" (1981) ►

Official performance video
- "What's Another Year" on YouTube

"What's Another Year" is a song recorded by Irish singer-songwriter Johnny Logan with music composed and lyrics written by Shay Healy. It represented Ireland in the Eurovision Song Contest 1980 held in The Hague, resulting in his first win at the contest, as well as the country's second victory.

The song reached number one on the UK Singles Chart for two weeks in May 1980.

== Background ==
=== Conception ===
"What's Another Year" was written by Shay Healy. When showband frontman Glen Curtin, the original choice of singer, turned it down, the song was rearranged by Bill Whelan to suit Johnny Logan's singing style. Musically, the song is easily identifiable by its saxophone introduction played by Scottish musician Colin Tully. Logan recorded the song in English, German –as "Was ist schon ein Jahr"–, and Spanish –as "¿Qué es un año más?"–.

=== Eurovision ===
On 9 March 1980, "What's Another Year" performed by Logan competed in the national selection organised by Raidió Teilifís Éireann (RTÉ) to select its song and performer for the 25th edition of the Eurovision Song Contest. The song won the competition so it became the Irish entrant –and Logan the performer– for Eurovision.

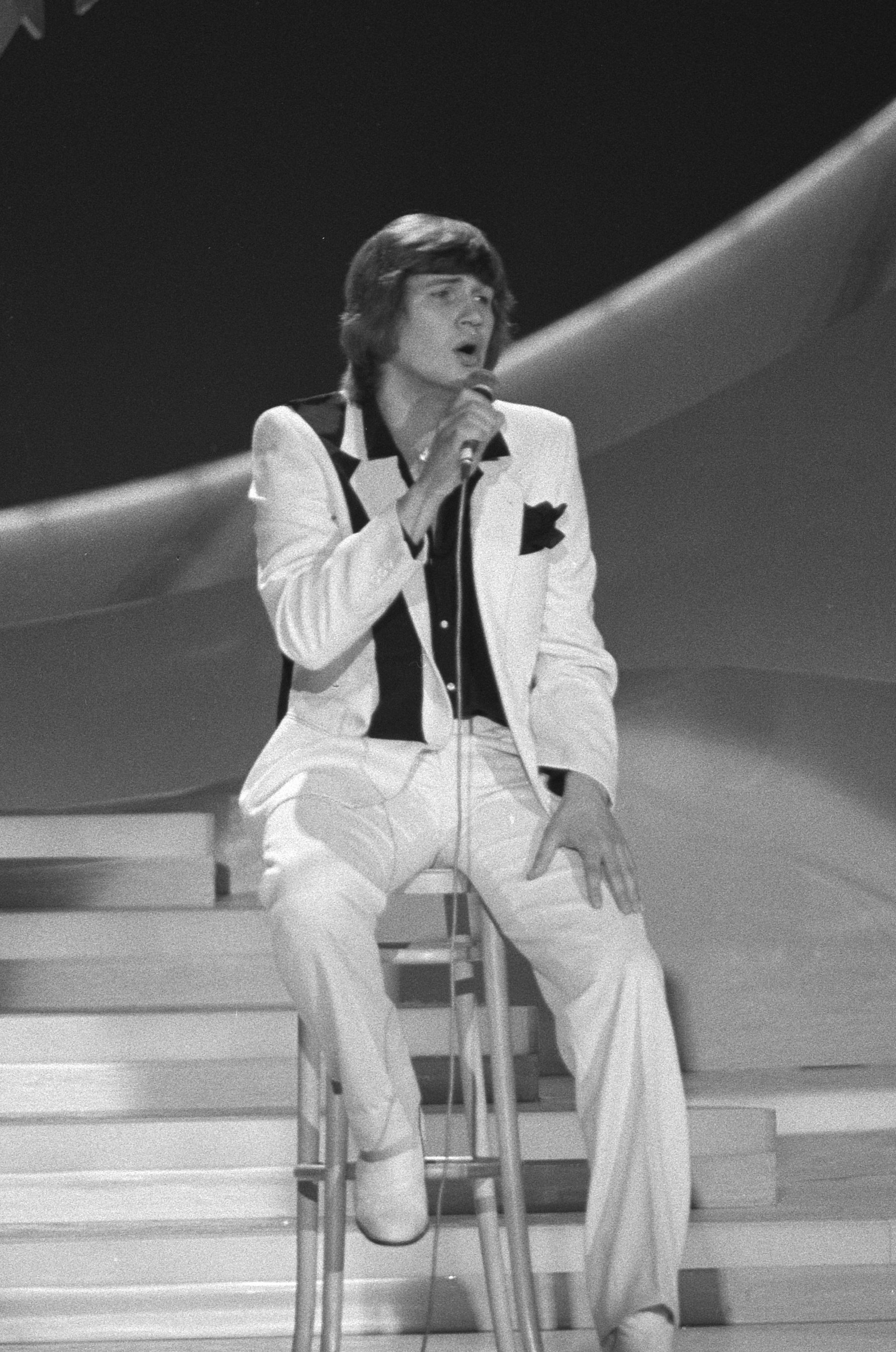
Logan at Eurovision

On 19 April 1980, the Eurovision Song Contest was held at the Nederlands Congresgebouw in The Hague hosted by Nederlandse Omroep Stichting (NOS), and broadcast live throughout the continent. Logan performed "What's Another Year" seventeenth on the evening, following France's "Hé, hé M'sieurs dames" by Profil and preceding Spain's "Quédate esta noche" by Trigo Limpio. Noel Kelehan conducted the event's live orchestra in the performance of the Irish entry.

At the close of voting, it had received 143 points, placing first in a field of nineteen, and winning the contest. In his winning reprise, Logan was overcome with emotion and could not achieve the high notes near the end of the song. Instead, he called out "I love you Ireland", a phrase he would repeat seven years later. It was succeeded as Eurovision winner at the 1981 contest by "Making Your Mind Up" by Bucks Fizz for the United Kingdom. It was succeeded as Irish representative 1981 by "Horoscopes" by Sheeba.

=== Aftermath ===
The success of "What's Another Year" launched Logan's Eurovision career. He would go on to win the 1987 contest with "Hold Me Now", and he would have another win as songwriter with "Why Me?" by Linda Martin in the 1992 contest.

On 22 August 1981, Logan performed his song in the Eurovision twenty-fifth anniversary concert Songs of Europe held in Mysen. "What's Another Year" was one of fourteen songs chosen by Eurovision fans and a European Broadcasting Union (EBU) reference group, from among the 992 songs that had ever participated in the contest, to participate in the fiftieth anniversary competition Congratulations: 50 Years of the Eurovision Song Contest held on 22 October 2005 in Copenhagen. On 31 March 2015, in the Eurovision sixtieth anniversary concert Eurovision Song Contest's Greatest Hits held in London, Logan performed the song as part of a medley with "Why Me?" and "Hold Me Now".

In the television special Eurovision: Europe Shine a Light, aired on 16 May 2020 throughout Europe, Logan performed the song live from a studio in Dublin. He was backed by the special's presenters Edsilia Rombley, Chantal Janzen, and Jan Smit from their studio in Hilversum, and a chorus of Euro-fans from around the world. A short video highlighting Logan's three Eurovision wins was shown during the instrumental bridge of the song.

== Track listing ==
- European single 7" / 45 RPM single (RL 1005)/(EPC 8572)

A. "What's Another Year"
B. "One Night Stand"

- Spanish single 7" single (EPC 8572)

A. "Por un Año Más" - 3:08
B. "One Night Stand" - 3:52

- West German single 7" single (EPC 8732)

A. "Was Ist Schon Ein Jahr" - 3:08
B. "One Night Stand" - 3:52

== Charts ==
The song reached number one on the UK Singles Chart for two weeks in May.

=== Weekly charts ===
Chart (1980)	Peak position
Austria (Ö3 Austria Top 40)	5
Belgium (Ultratop 50 Flanders)	1
Denmark (Hitlisten)	6
Finland (Suomen virallinen lista)	1
Ireland (IRMA)	1
Israel (IBA)	1
Netherlands (Dutch Top 40)	3
Netherlands (Single Top 100)	6
Norway (VG-lista)	1
Portugal (AFP)	1
Sweden (Sverigetopplistan)	1
Switzerland (Schweizer Hitparade)	2
UK Singles (Official Charts)	1
West Germany (GfK)	2

=== Year-end charts ===
Chart (1980)	Peak position
Austria (Ö3 Austria Top 40)	17
Belgium (Ultratop Flanders)	15
Netherlands (Dutch Top 40)	48
Netherlands (Single Top 100)	74
Switzerland (Schweizer Hitparade)	20
West Germany (Official German Charts)	23

== Cover versions ==
The song was covered by Shane MacGowan of the Pogues for the 1998 covers album Song for Eurotrash.

Preceded by "Hallelujah" by Milk and Honey	Eurovision Song Contest winners 1980	Succeeded by "Making Your Mind Up" by Bucks Fizz
