= Pixieland =

Pixieland may refer to:

- Pixieland (Dartmoor), a visitor attraction in Dartmoor National Park
- Pixieland (Oregon), United States, a theme park that operated between 1969 and 1974
- "Pixieland", a song by Shorty Rogers on the 1957 album Way Up There
- Pixieland Productions, a music production company owned by Camilla Gottschalck and Christina Schilling
- Brocklands Adventure Park, a former leisure park in Cornwall, United Kingdom known as Pixieland Fun Park between 1997 and 2000
