= Mitt i ett andetag =

Studio album by Titanix
- Released: June 22, 2011
- Genre: Dansband music
- Label: EMI Music Sweden
- Producer: Thomas Törnholm

Titanix chronology
Drömmar får liv (2010)	Mitt i ett andetag (2011)	Genom natten (2012)

Mitt i ett andetag is a 2011 studio album by Titanix.

== Track listing ==
1. Nu är det lördag igen ("Another Saturday Night") (Sam Cooke/ Hans Sidén)
2. Night by the Lake (Daniel Nilsson/Henrik Szabo/Christina Schilling /Camilla Gottschalck/Jonas Gladnikoff)
3. Om du bara visste (Stefan Brunzell /Ulf Georgsson)
4. Vi dansar så kärleksfullt i natten (Kalle Kindbom /Jari Kujansuu)
5. Kärleken (Jerry Rolf)
6. So Long (Benny Andersson/ Björn Ulvaeus)
7. Här står jag (Thomas Thörnholm/Dan Attlerud)
8. Överallt (Calle Kindbom/Carl Lösnitz /Niclas Edberger)
9. Varje gång nån frågar om dig (Bo Nilsson, Henrik Henriksson)
10. Hot n Cold (Lukasz Gottwald/Max Martin /Katy Perry)
11. Vem vill va min ängel (Mikael Olsson/Joakim Mullo)
12. Be Careful What You're Wishing for (Kenneth Westlin/Sören Jonsson /Camilla Andersson)

== Charts ==
Chart (2011)	Peak position
Sweden (Sverigetopplistan)	10
