= The Late Late Show season 47 =

The 47th season of The Late Late Show, the world's longest-running chat show, began on 5 September 2008 and concluded on 29 May 2009. It aired on RTÉ One each Friday evening from 21:30.

As by then customary, the series featured a variety of unpleasant moments for the presenter, Pat Kenny, who grappled with issues as diverse as viewer telephone competitions, contentious performances and perplexing interviewees. This season also marked the only occasion on which Kenny was absent during his ten-year tenure, following the unexpected death of his mother. Gerry Ryan guest-hosted the 24 October edition of the show in Kenny's absence. In February 2009, Kenny was widely criticised by the Irish media for his attempted interview of the Pete Doherty, when he personalised the English rock musician and ignored his music. Late the following month, live on air, he announced his intention to quit.

== Pre-season ==
Before the season began presenter Pat Kenny had been reluctant to sign up for the show again.

== First episode ==
The opening episode of the season was broadcast from the Wexford Opera House on 5 September 2008. Guests included the Taoiseach Brian Cowen,

== Second episode ==
In the first of a number of incidents related to phone-in competitions, on 12 September 2008, Kenny attempted to give away an Austrian family holiday to a viewer. Encountering an unenthusiastic response from the winner, and aided by a joke from the comedian Jimmy Carr which referred to the timing of the prize with the revelations contained in the Fritzl case, the presenter then broke down in a fit of laughter live on air. The humorous incident has since achieved cult status on YouTube and other sites.

== Seventh episode ==
The comedian Tom O'Connor made his fourteenth appearance on the show in this episode.

== Eighth episode ==
Gerry Ryan famously presented the 24 October 2008 show in the absence of regular host Pat Kenny

The Gerry Ryan edition of The Late Late Show featured, among other guests, the stand-up comedian Tommy Tiernan. Tiernan made what was the latest in a series of appearances on the show to have provoked debate and given cause for complaint. On the show Tiernan made reference to a man left severely disabled by a motorcycle accident and spoke a joke involving an act of sexual intercourse with a Traveller. A number of viewers, including the mother of a boy with Down syndrome and a road crash victim, took offence to Tiernan's joke about a disabled man in Saint Michael's Rehabilitation Hospital, Dún Laoghaire, from whom the comedian was attempting to purchase a motorbike. Tiernan's punchline was that the man could not accept his payment as he had no grip. There were complaints over the comedian's acting "spasticated" and in a "mocking fashion which can only be described as grossly insulting". The Traveller support organisation, Pavee Point took offence at Tiernan's remarks about having sex with a Traveller, accusing him of acting "in a disgusting, outrageous and racist way" and criticising him for suggesting that Travellers were in some way "unclean, possibly stupid and sexually promiscuous". RTÉ defended its guest by stating that Tiernan's Irish humour was a celebration of the diversity of modern Ireland, the practice of "insulting people in a humorous way". The Broadcasting Complaints Commission (BCC) upheld eight "derogatory" and "totally inappropriate" complaints against the show and criticised Ryan for "actively engaging" and "egging on" the comedian.

== Twelfth episode ==
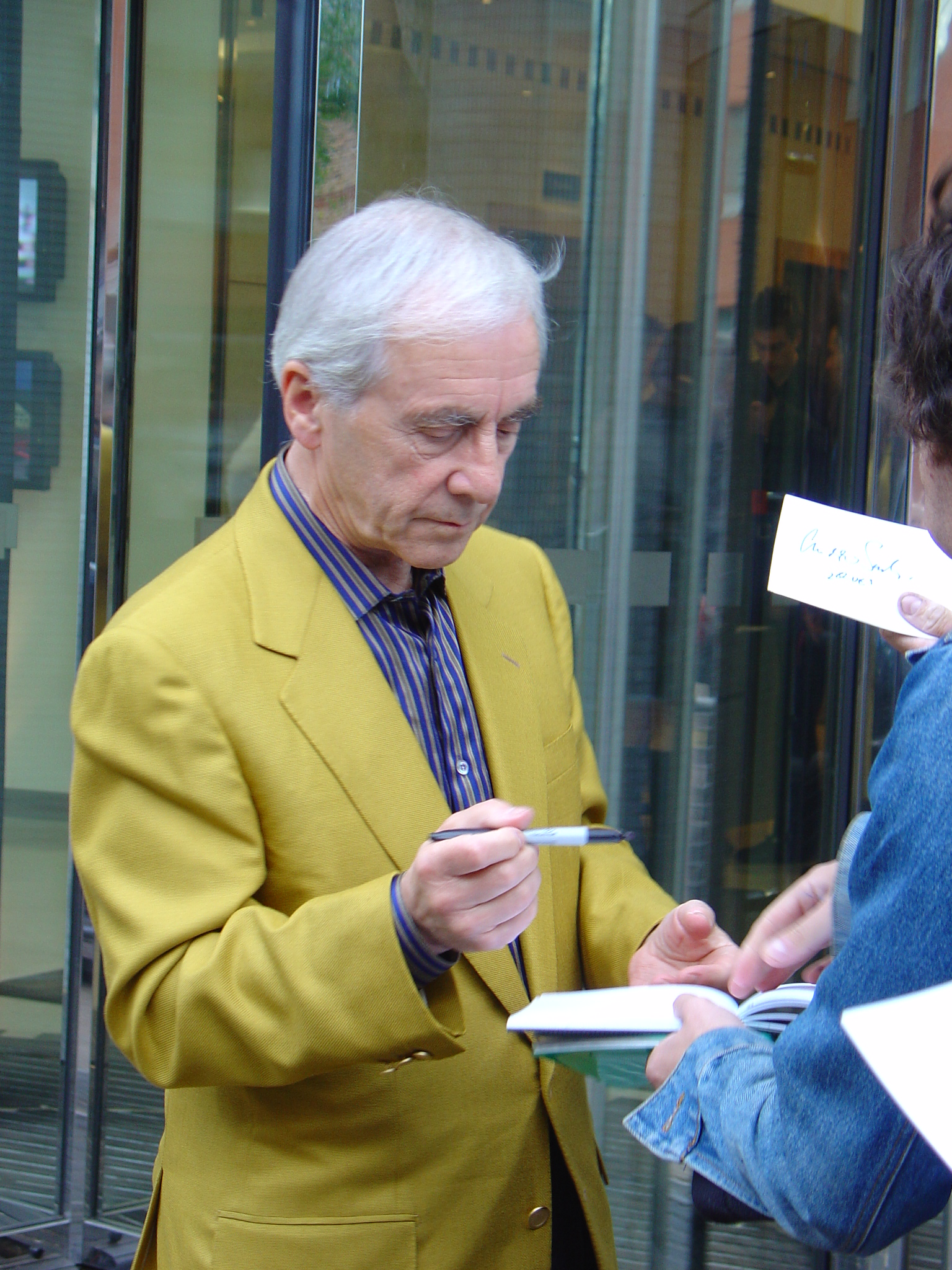
A controversy involving the granddaughter of actor Andrew Sachs (above) led to a performance on The Late Late Show which was disagreeable to some members of the general public.

A Late Late appearance by the dance troupe, Satanic Sluts on 21 November 2008 led to what an RTÉ spokesperson described as a significant number of complaints by viewers. The group became known in the neighbouring country of the United Kingdom following a controversial incident involving telephone calls made by two previously highly regarded BBC broadcasters later punished for their actions. One of the group's performers was Georgina Baillie who had recently been on the receiving end of the telephone messages which were broadcast on national radio in her country. Baillie was interviewed by Pat Kenny, speaking of her disgust at the prank calls and the effect they had on her grandfather, the Fawlty Towers actor Andrew Sachs. She then took part in a risque performance entitled the "Robot Routine" with the other two girls which provoked the complaints.

=== Toy Show ticket tearing incident ===
At the end of the thirteenth episode of this season, Kenny became involved in a hostile incident with a viewer participating in a phone-in competition. Barbara Heavey from Cork was proclaimed the winner of a prize consisting of two tickets for The Late Late Toy Show (taking place the following week), as well as a €10,000 cash prize. When Kenny rang Heavey live on air she stated that she was not particularly interested in the tickets but would accept the cash prize. Kenny vented his frustration by tearing up two tickets. He asked why she had bothered to enter the competition if she was not available to attend the event to which she replied her entry had been "out of boredom". Heavey later suggested Kenny was ungracious and reiterated her lack of interest in watching children "play with toys for two hours", adding that she has no children of her own. Despite numerous attempts by RTÉ to have her attend the Toy Show, she said she would be "bored stiff", wasn't interested in toys and, if she had to attend the show, would probably "set off the smoke alarms by chain-smoking in the toilets". Kenny did not let the matter rest however, opening his morning radio show the following Monday with a five-minute chat to his listeners in which he implied that the torn-up tickets were of more value than All Ireland Final and Munster v. All Blacks tickets. Within minutes footage was uploaded onto the video hosting website YouTube, with spoofs of the incident also created. and Heavey was congratulated in numerous national newspapers.

== Twentieth episode ==
On 30 January 2009, Ian Paisley and his wife Eileen appeared on The Late Late Show to discuss his teetotalism and his refusal to go to the cinema unless the film was about Oliver Cromwell.

== Twenty-first episode ==
=== Non-interview with a poet ===
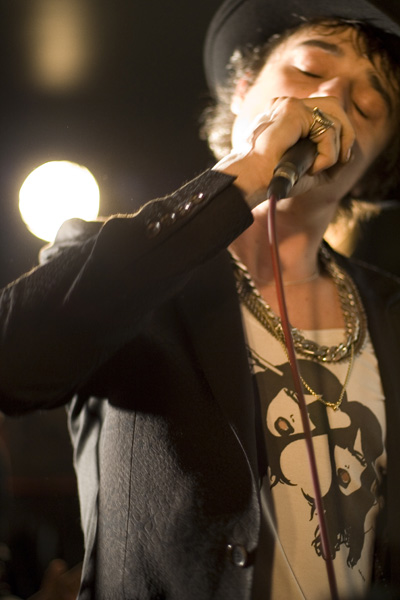
Pat Kenny's interview with Pete Doherty provoked widespread interest from the Irish print media.

On 6 February 2009, the poet Cathal Ó Searcaigh had been due to appear on The Late Late Show. However, he cancelled the appearance when RTÉ's legal advisors recommended the interview be pre-recorded instead of the standard live interviews the programme was known for carrying out. Ó Searcaigh had previously declined to be interviewed on The Late Late Show in March 2008. Presenter Pat Kenny stated on the live broadcast that the invitation still stood, despite the poet turning down the invitation twice. It was speculated that English musician Pete Doherty had been drafted in as a replacement; this interview proved just as, if not more, controversial.

=== Interview with a musician instead ===
In the opening part of the show and in what the Irish Independent referred to as "TV gold" and The Irish Times dubbed "car-crash television", Kenny unsuccessfully attempted to interview the English musician Pete Doherty. When a young female audience member loudly professed her love for Doherty and shouted how she had waited outside Trinity for four hours to catch a glimpse of him, Kenny responded by saying: "You have at least one fan in the audience." The musician was dissatisfied with Kenny's repeated questioning of his drug abuse and love life and became irritated by Kenny's cumbersome comparison of him with Shane MacGowan. Then the musician asked the presenter: "I don't know if you could name a song that I've written?", only to receive the reply: "No, possibly not." Doherty went on to ask why "this [the drugs issue] has to be the be all and end all of how you look at someone and judge someone", and having counted Kenny's questions informed him that "the last 12 questions you've asked me have been about drugs". In protest at Kenny's apparent lack of knowledge on his subject matter, Doherty pulled his hat over his eyes and refused to engage any further in the conversation. Kenny managed to resolve the situation by inviting Doherty to play a song for the audience (an acoustic cover of a song from his upcoming solo album.) Doherty had been in Ireland to attend Trinity College, Dublin where he was made an Honorary Patron of the student Philosophical Society at the university earlier that day.

=== Tears of a former professional footballer ===
Broadcaster Eamon Dunphy's teary-eyed interview with Pat Kenny, which took place in a slot where he discussed the state of the nation alongside Senator Eoghan Harris and journalist John Waters, proved a talking point among the Irish media and general public. The Evening Herald remarked on the difference between this and Dunphy's previous references to Kenny as a "plank". It also conducted a survey among people in Dublin which found that the public overwhelmingly supported Dunphy, who had burst into floods of tears upon describing how as a child his father had returned home one day to inform him that he had lost his job and that some of his friends were now having difficulty retaining their houses. The incident happened at the end of an eventful evening for the chat show, following the Ó Searcaigh cancellation and Kenny's infamous interview with Ó Searcaigh's replacement, the musician Pete Doherty.

== Twenty-fifth episode ==
Andrea Bocelli was a guest.

== Twenty-sixth episode ==
Guests included Carosel.

== Twenty-seventh episode ==
On 20 March 2009, a number of senators appeared on the show to debate on a proposal to abolish Seanad Éireann. Journalists John Drennan and Ian O'Doherty also spoke. It was the first time such a large amount of senators had appeared on television together.

== Twenty-eighth episode ==
Pat Kenny unexpectedly announced a "bit of news" - his resignation as host - live on air on 27 March 2009, saying he had discussed the decision with his family and that "all good things must come to an end".

== Thirty-first episode ==
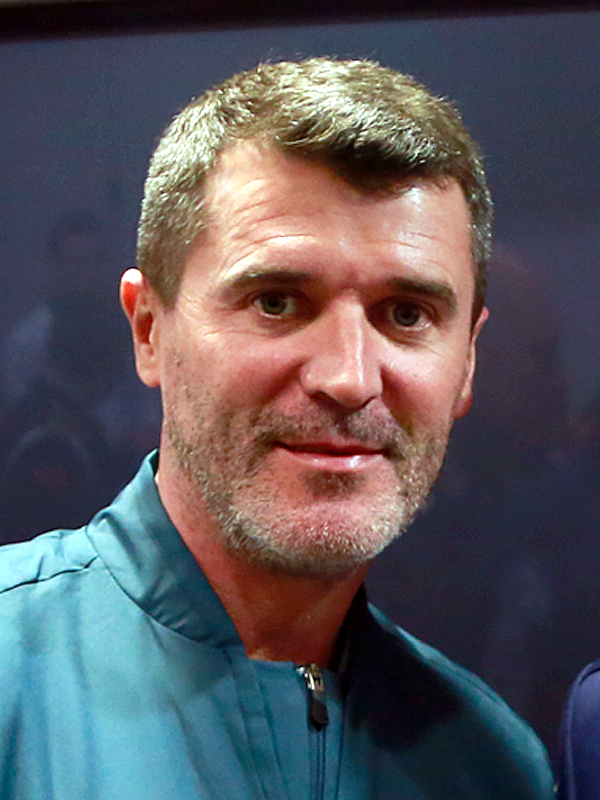
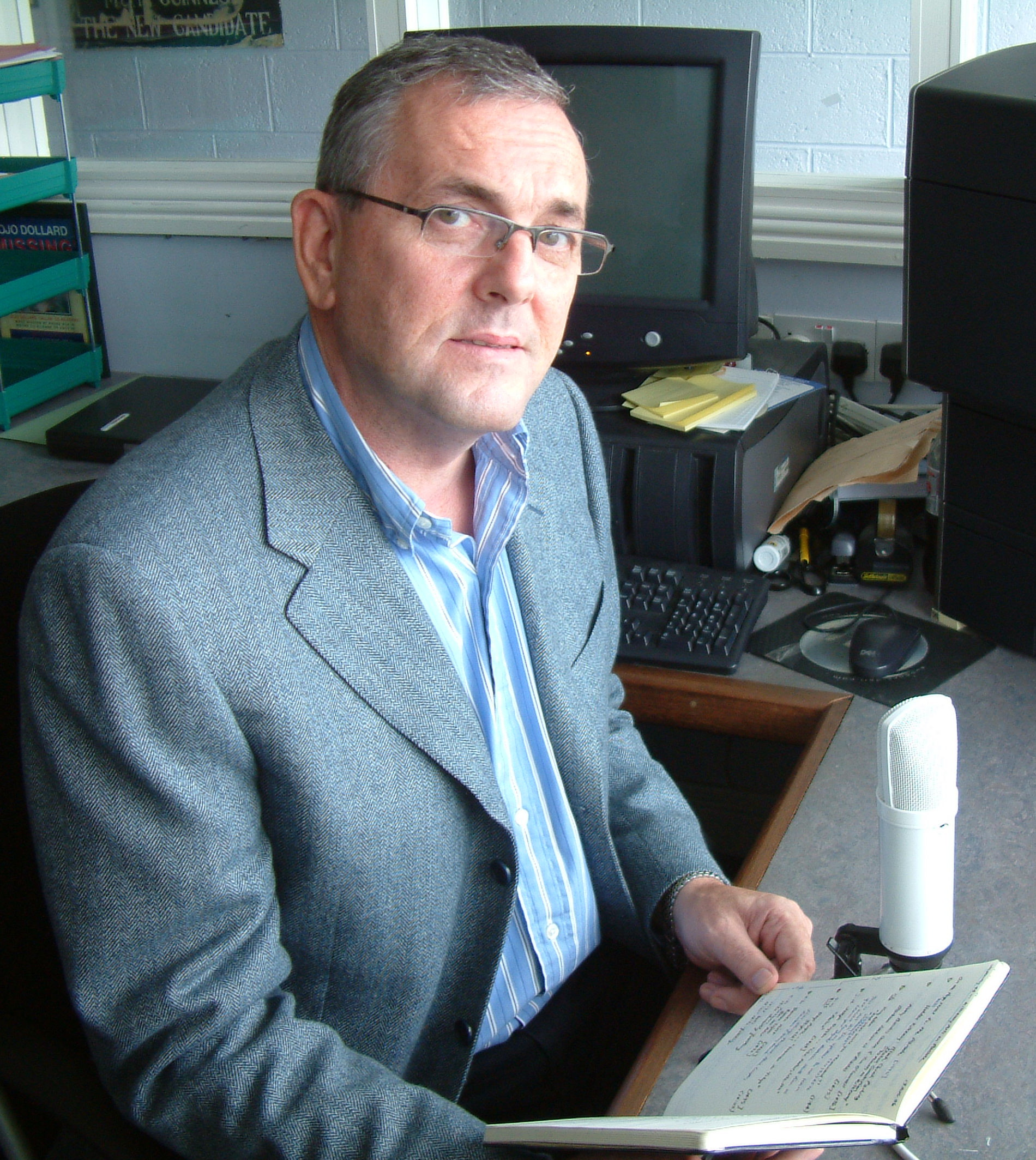
Roy Keane (left) revealed a lack of interest on The Late Late Show, while TD John McGuinness (right) used the occasion to criticise the Tánaiste.

When TD John McGuinness appeared on The Late Late Show on 24 April 2009, he criticised Ireland's Tánaiste Mary Coughlan for her part in his not being reappointed as a Minister of State. Taoiseach Brian Cowen had earlier asked all the Ministers of State to resign, with a smaller number to be reappointed as part of the government's emergency budget. Cowen later denied claims that Coughlan had "issued an ultimatium [sic] that if Mr McGuinness did not go, she would".

== Thirty-second episode ==
Roy Keane's interview for The Late Late Show aired on 1 May 2009. Keane spoke of his managerial role at Ipswich Town, Cristiano Ronaldo, Eamon Dunphy and informed Pat (and the nation) that he had "very little interest in what happens at United". Keane also revealed that he spoke no more with his former manager Alex Ferguson, saying they had a "disagreement".

== Thirty-fifth episode ==
On 22 May 2009, "Trouble with a Capital T" was performed by The Troublemakers, a group of Irish musicians which included members of The Blizzards, Republic of Loose, Brian Hogan, Kevin Godley and some former members of Horslips, who are the original performers of the song, which came together to release a charity single.

== Kenny's final episode ==
Host Pat Kenny (seen here visibly clutching his sides after encountering unexpected obstacles while trying to give away the prize of a family holiday in Austria at the start of this season) bowed out months later.

On 29 May 2009, Kenny presented his last edition of The Late Late Show as regular host (he returned for one night in 2013 when his successor was unavailable). An outdoor event was set up for the occasion on the RTÉ campus. At the end of the show, Joe Duffy presented Kenny with a cake in the shape of a "10", to mark his ten years of presenting. The Edge of U2 also gave Kenny glasses and a guitar. The number of viewers who tuned in to watch the last show peaked at 996,000, with an average share of 55 per cent of the total TV audience.

== Special editions ==
The 2008 Toy Show aired on 28 November 2008.

Tribute shows to Boyzone, Joe Dolan and GAA 125 aired this season.

The 2009 Eurosong Final was held on The Late Late Show on 20 February. Six acts performed live on the show after which the public and a panel of four juries in Cork, Limerick, Sligo and Dublin chose the country's representative for the contest. The studio's expert panel featured Jerry Springer, Linda Martin and Marty Whelan. There were allegations of rule-breaking prior to the show when one entry was posted on YouTube. RTÉ prefers that none of the songs are made public until it says so, and the offending song was quickly removed from the site. The winning song was "Et Cetera", performed by Sinéad Mulvey and Black Daisy.

== Episode list ==
No.	Original release date	Guest(s)	Musical/entertainment guest(s)
1	5 September 2008	Olympic boxing medalists Kenny Egan, Darren Sutherland and Paddy Barnes	Sharon Shannon and Jerry Fish
An external broadcast live from the Wexford Opera House
2	12 September 2008	Trinny and Susannah	Mick Flannery
3	19 September 2008	Paralympics gold medalists and performance director (Jason Smyth, Michael McKillop and Liam Harbison)	The Script
4	26 September 2008	Kathryn Thomas	Boyzone
5	3 October 2008	Sonia O'Sullivan	Katherine Lynch, Tracy Piggott, Mary O'Rourke and Brian Kerr "Run for Africa" on a treadmill
6	10 October 2008	Cecelia Ahern	Mary Coughlan
7	17 October 2008	Michael Parkinson	Duke Special
8	24 October 2008	Tony Curtis	Snow Patrol
Presented by Gerry Ryan in the absence of Pat Kenny
9	31 October 2008	Myleene Klass	The Saw Doctors
10	7 November 2008	Lindsay Wagner	Hardy Drew and the Nancy Boys
11	14 November 2008	Paul O'Grady	Tom Jones
12	21 November 2008	Kelly O'Neill and Shane Curry	Kíla
At the end of this episode Pat Kenny produced two tickets for the following week's show and tore them to pieces in the presence of Amazon explorer Charles Bird.
13	28 November 2008	Nicky Byrne	McFly
The Late Late Toy Show
14	5 December 2008	Michael O'Leary	Pat Shortt
15	12 December 2008	Celebrities on Ice (Lisa Murphy, Shane Byrne, Patricia McKenna and Brian Ormond)	The Dubliners and Damien Dempsey
16	19 December 2008	Boyzone	Boyzone
Mainly but not officially a Boyzone special
17	9 January 2009	TBA	TBA
Mainly but not officially a Boyzone special
18	16 January 2009	TBA	TBA
19	23 January 2009	TBA	TBA
20	30 January 2009	TBA	TBA
21	6 February 2009	TBA	TBA
22	13 February 2009	TBA	TBA
23	20 February 2009	TBA	TBA
Eurosong special
24	27 February 2009	TBA	TBA
25	6 March 2009	TBA	TBA
26	13 March 2009	TBA	TBA
27	20 March 2009	TBA	TBA
28	27 March 2009	TBA	TBA
Pat Kenny resigned as host after 10 years
29	3 April 2009	TBA	TBA
30	17 April 2009	TBA	TBA
31	24 April 2009	TBA	TBA
32	1 May 2009	TBA	TBA
33	8 May 2009	TBA	TBA
34	15 May 2009	TBA	TBA
35	22 May 2009	TBA	TBA
36	29 May 2009	TBA	TBA
