= Maria Rolf =

Swedish singer (born 1970)

- Born: 1970 (age 55–56)
- Origin: Stockholm, Sweden
- Genres: dansband music
- Occupation: singer
- Years active: 1990–present
- Label: Frituna
- Member of: Titanix

Maria Rolf (born 1970) is a Swedish singer and the singer of dansband Titanix.

In February 2010, she participated in the Sveriges dansband för Haiti aid, following an earthquake in Haiti.

On 18 July 2010, she won a Guldklaven Award in the category "female singer of the year" during Svenska dansbandsveckan in Malung.
