= Malung Church =

Coordinates: 60.6683°N 13.7321°E

- Malungs kyrka
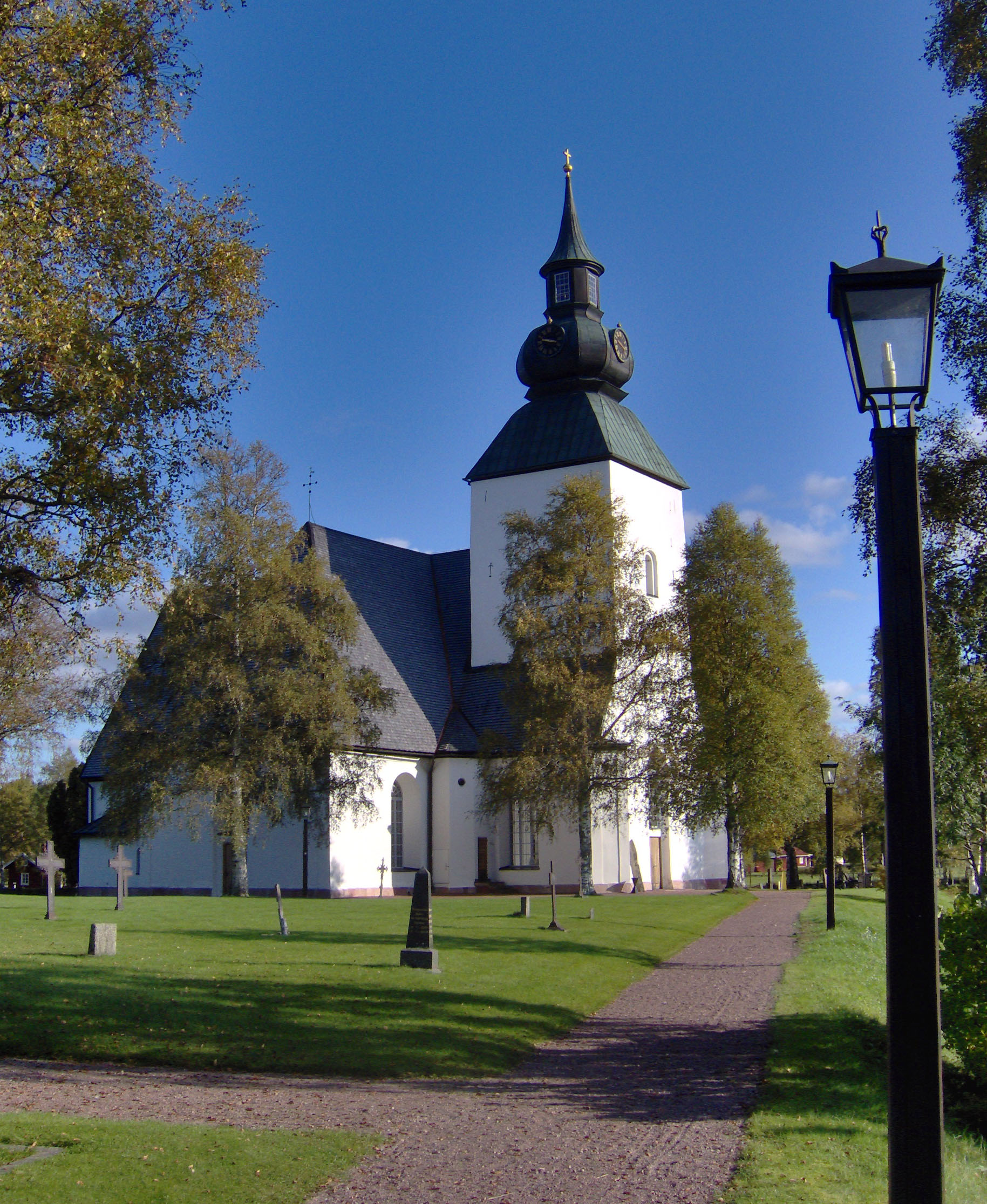
- Malung Church in September 2008
- Malung Church
- Location: Malung
- Country: Sweden
- Denomination: Church of Sweden

Administration
- Diocese: Västerås
- Parish: Malung

The Malung Church (Swedish: Malungs kyrka) is a church building in Malung, Sweden. Belonging to the Malung Parish of the Church of Sweden, it is supposed to have been built in 1365.
