= Malung, Minnesota =

Malung
- Unincorporated community
- Location within Minnesota Location within the United States
- Coordinates: 48°46′21″N 95°43′27″W
- Country: United States
- State: Minnesota
- County: Roseau
- Elevation: 1,063 ft (324 m)
- Time zone: UTC-6 (Central (CST))
  - Summer (DST): UTC-5 (CDT)
- Area code: 218
- GNIS feature ID: 654810

Malung is an unincorporated community in Roseau County, in the U.S. state of Minnesota.

== History ==
A post office called Malung was established in 1895, and remained in operation until 1954. The community was named after Malung, in Sweden.
