= John O'Donoghue expenses scandal =

Irish political controversy

The John O'Donoghue expenses scandal saw former Ceann Comhairle John O'Donoghue pursued by various allegations over his expenses claims in Ireland's Sunday newspapers over several months in 2009. He spent €250,000 in his time as Ceann Comhairle and €550,000 in his time as Minister for Arts, Sport and Tourism. His wife Kate-Ann also enjoyed many of the expenses. Tabloid newspapers referred to the politician with titles such as "Johnny Cash". The Irish Green Party, junior coalition partners in government, requested a reform of the system following the revelations. The accountant in charge of expenses had also resigned in protest at the system. O'Donoghue was the first Ceann Comhairle to forcefully resign; however, Patrick Hogan resigned the post for health reasons in 1967.

O'Donoghue announced his resignation from the position of Ceann Comhairle on the evening of 6 October 2009, effective as of 13 October 2009. The Irish Independent opined: "Were Louis the XIV around today, the Sun King would likely be envious of the lavish style that John O'Donoghue brought to public office". The Australian noted that the controversy followed just three months after a similar one brought down Michael Martin of the United Kingdom. The Observer blamed his fall on "a keen interest in racing", particularly his trips to Aintree, Cheltenham and the Melbourne Cup. David Sharrock of The Times suggested the government was "close to collapse" and contrasted the expenses with a report that one school in Ireland had requested children to bring their own toilet paper to classes.

== Details of expenses ==
As Ceann Comhairle, O'Donoghue employed seven more office staff than the previous Ceann Comhairle who managed with three staff.

O'Donoghue and Brendan Howlin shared a "working dinner" in June 2007. The cost of the €293 meal was paid for by O'Donoghue. He also dined regularly in Michelin-starred restaurants, on many occasions with his wife.

Four trips to Britain in 2006 and 2007 led to €21,000 expenses claims for hiring cars.

He claimed expenses on a £1 sterling donation which he personally gave to UNICEF when in Scotland. The donation was part of the hotel bill. The total bill for his stay there from 21 January until 24 January 2009 came to €801.70.

He regularly attended horse racing sessions and even brought his wife, secretary and other officials to the Melbourne Cup in Australia in 2003. He returned in 2005, telling a magazine the following year that: "There's nothing quite like Melbourne Cup day in Australia".

He claimed expenses of €600 on a limousine to take him to horse racing at Aintree.

He claimed for another limousine to carry him between terminals at Heathrow Airport in London. The total claimed for this limousine was €472.

He claimed nearly €900 per night for a 2006 stay in the Radisson Hotel in Liverpool.

He resided in one hotel in Paris where rooms cost €633 per night.

Many of the expenses were claimed for tips he gave – one of these amounted to almost €200.

He purchased many gifts such as €882 worth of items from the House of Ireland shop and 2006 Midleton whiskey which totalled €135.

€4,956 was claimed on the hire of limousines during a trip to several cities in the United States.

€11,869 in expenses was claimed on advertisements displayed in local newspapers in his native Kerry.

On 6 October 2009, it was revealed that O'Donoghue had spent more than €20,000 at nine different race meetings internationally over the four-year period of 2003–2007.

The controversy is the subject of a book Snouts in the Trough by journalist Ken Foxe, who originally broke the story in the Sunday Tribune.

== Events surrounding resignation ==
On 11 September 2009, O'Donoghue sent a letter to every TD in which he said he had done nothing wrong. He made his first public comments on his expenses on 15 September 2009 whilst attending the races in Listowel, claiming to have "behaved in good faith and with probity throughout" and ending with "in so far as one regrets something, I think that is an apology". The following day, O'Donoghue made a proper public apology for his expenses claimed while in office as Irish Minister for Arts, Sport and Tourism. He also issued a statement, saying: "I was not aware of the cost of these arrangements. When I read the detail in the past weeks, I was embarrassed that such costs were associated with some of the arrangements made on my behalf".

O'Donoghue released his expenses record for the previous two years on 2 October 2009. These revealed foreign travels bills totalling €45,000, €13,000 for the hiring of cars and limousines to travel between airport terminals when outside Ireland and slightly less than €5,000 in total in fees for VIP lounges. Sinn Féin were the first party to call for O'Donoughue to resign, with Dáil leader Caoimhghín Ó Caoláin stating O'Donoghues position was untenable given "a continued waste of public money" since he took the job. Eamon Gilmore, leader of the Labour Party, openly expressed an opinion that O'Donoghue was bringing the office of Ceann Comhairle into disrepute and requested a meeting with the leaders of Dáil Éireann's other political parties on the matter. Enda Kenny, leader of Fine Gael, called on O'Donoghue to sort himself out or he would be expected to resign. John Gormley, leader of Green Party, asked for the matter to be resolved urgently. O'Donoghue responded to these criticisms by saying he would address the Oireachtas Commission where he would give "detailed proposals". He announced details of his resignation as Ceann Comhairle at 22:30 the following evening after pressure from Gilmore, who said his reign was now "untenable", backed by Kenny. However, Kenny requested that he resign the role with immediate effect. O'Donoghue quit the post on 13 October 2009. Before doing so he made a statement on his expenses. Séamus Kirk was elected his successor.

It was later revealed that O'Donoghue had told Gilmore twice via telephone before his resignation not to "do anything precipitous".

=== Reaction ===
Former Taoiseach Bertie Ahern, at a book signing in Belfast to promote the release of his autobiography, expressed his sorrow for O'Donoghue. Ahern nominated O'Donoghue for the position of Ceann Comhairle in 2007. He told BBC Radio:

John O'Donoghue was an outstanding Minister for Justice, an outstanding Minister for Tourism, Arts and Sport. He did travel abroad. Tourism was an all-island subject and he went to the cultural events and sporting events and knowing John I think a lot of those events he would have been happier not to be going to. He would be happier to be down in Kerry. But that's how it goes. [...] The issue about expenses abroad, I think I've some sympathy with office holders about that because what happens is when you go abroad embassies and the people you go to organise the hotels and travel and the office holder, the ministers – in this case John O'Donoghue – would have little control over where he stays.

Ahern also used a promotional television appearance on The Late Late Show on RTÉ One to defend O'Donoghue, claiming he had been "dumped on".

Irish Minister for Finance Brian Lenihan Jnr criticised the forceful nature of O'Donoghue's resignation, claiming he had not been allowed to explain himself.

Irish Minister for Arts, Sport and Tourism Martin Cullen accused the media of having "extremely distorted" the expenses claims. He criticised what he termed as "the denigration of decent people who had served for a long period of time", claiming that "anybody that goes abroad for this country [Ireland] works extremely hard, and it is unfortunate that it is presented all the time as some kind of junket". He also claimed he would prefer to spend Saint Patrick's Day at home "rather than attending 24 functions in 48 hours" as was the case in 2009, according to Cullen.

Irish Minister for Foreign Affairs Micheál Martin described the expenses situation as "damaging".

Deputy Jackie Healy-Rae said on Radio Kerry:

This is a sad situation to see John O'Donoghue go like this [...] The man was hounded out of office, there's no doubt about it.

Kerry former footballer and manager Páidí Ó Sé said on Newstalk:

Eamon Gilmore got the head of John O'Donoghue, and what Fine Gael is trying to do now is to get the left ear of his decapitated [sic] head.

Mayor of Kilkenny, Malcolm Noonan of the Green Party, reacted positively to O'Donoghue's resignation, saying "Oireachtas members are well paid for their work, there should be absolutely no abuse of the system" particularly whilst "so many people and communities are suffering".

Gerald Kean, a prominent celebrity solicitor, said O'Donoghue's behaviour was "absolutely, totally unacceptable".

== Aftermath ==
O'Donoghue received €112,000, described as a "golden parachute" payment. He announced his intention to seek election again at the next opportunity – "standing for re-election in South Kerry, definitely". He lost his seat at the 2011 general election.

Further revelations were also disclosed, including €1,000 spent on two tickets for the 2007 Rugby World Cup Final in Paris, despite O'Donoghue being Ceann Comhairle at that time and no longer Minister for Arts, Sport and Tourism. The tickets were requested from the Irish Sports Council by O'Donoghue; the Council explained: "It was decided to offer him the tickets on a complimentary basis in recognition of his efforts on behalf of Irish sport".
