= Christina Schilling =

Danish songwriter, singer and musician

- Born: Seoul, South Korea
- Origin: Denmark, South Korea
- Genres: pop, jazz pop
- Occupation(s): Songwriter, singer, instrumentalist
- Instrument(s): Piano, guitar, ukulele

Christina Schilling is a Danish songwriter, singer and musician. She has written songs for artists in Denmark, Sweden, Iceland, Ireland, Spain, Slovenia, Latvia, Lithuania and South Africa, and is part of the songwriting team Pixieland Productions. Schilling is a member, songwriter and vocalist of the jazz pop project Technicoloured Roses.

== Career ==
As a songwriter, Schilling has worked with artists and producers from Europe as well as the USA, and written several songs for national Eurovision pre-selections and Eurovision Song Contest. In 2013 she co-wrote the winner of Viña del Mar International Song Festival 2013. In 2009 she represented Ireland with the song "Et Cetera" performed by Sinéad Mulvey & Black Daisy in Moscow, Russia. She also wrote and sang backing vocals for the runner up in the Dansk Melodi Grand Prix 2009, the Danish final, with the song "Someday" performed by the Icelandic singer Hera Björk, which became a big hit and secured a win for Denmark in the OGAE Second Chance Contest 2009. In 2010 she landed the Icelandic Top 20 Chart with the composition "Like Pantomime" performed by the Icelandic artist Erna Hrönn. In 2011 she co-wrote "Falling" sung by Nikki Kavanagh, which reached top 10 on iTunes, Ireland. Later that year the song "Volver" performed by Auryn took part in the Spanish pre-selection for Eurovision Song Contest, and was released on the group's album "Endless Road, 7058", which was awarded "Best New Album" by Televisión Española (TVE) and was a chart success reaching number 11 on PROMUSICAE, the official Spanish album chart. Her music has also been used in films and musicals, such as Bjørnen (The Bear) by Anton Chekhov in Copenhagen and Manny Quinn: The Musical in Dublin.

== Viña del Mar International Song Festival ==
In 2013 Schilling co-wrote the winner of the internationally prestigious music competition Viña del Mar International Song Festival held in Chile. "Because You Can" was performed by the Icelandic artist Hera Björk. The song was written by Christina Schilling, Camilla Gottschalck, Hera Björk, Örlygur Smári and Jonas Gladnikoff. This was the first time in history a winner of Viña del Mar International Song Festival is written by Danish songwriters.

== Technicoloured Roses ==
Schilling is a member, songwriter and vocalist of the jazz pop project Technicoloured Roses. Their first single was Keep On Playing, and in 2012 the group released their debut EP Planet of the Roses.

== Entries in Eurovision Song Contest and national selections ==
- Someday by Hera Björk (Denmark 2009), 2nd place in national final
- Et Cetera by Sinéad Mulvey & Black Daisy (Eurovision Song Contest 2009), 1st place in national selection, 11th place in Eurovision semi-final
- Tonight by Kafka ir Ruta (Lithuania 2010), 4th place in semi-final of national selection
- Falling by Nikki Kavanagh (Ireland 2011), 2nd place in national selection
- Sueños rotos by Melissa (Spain 2011), 5th place in national selection
- Volver by Auryn (Spain 2011), 2nd place in national selection
- Run by Eva Boto (Slovenia 2012), 4th place in national selection
- Fool In Love by Davids & Dinara (Latvia 2013), 11th place in national selection
- Conquer My Heart by Svetlana Bogdanova (Moldova 2013) 11th place in national selection
- Sound of Colours by Jurgis Bruzga (Lithuania 2015), 5th place in national selection
- Dangerous (S.O.S.) (Lithuania 2015), 3rd place in national selection
