= Ireland in the Eurovision Song Contest 2010 =

- Eurovision Song Contest 2010
- Participating broadcaster: Raidió Teilifís Éireann (RTÉ)
- Country: Ireland
- Selection process: Eurosong 2010
- Selection date: 5 March 2010

Competing entry
- Song: "It's for You"
- Artist: Niamh Kavanagh
- Songwriters: Niall Mooney; Mårten Eriksson; Jonas Gladnikoff; Lina Eriksson

Placement
- Semi-final result: Qualified (9th, 67 points)
- Final result: 23rd, 25 points

Participation chronology

Ireland was represented at the Eurovision Song Contest 2010 with the song "It's for You", written by Niall Mooney, Mårten Eriksson, Jonas Gladnikoff, and Lina Eriksson, and performed by Niamh Kavanagh. The Irish participating broadcaster, Raidió Teilifís Éireann (RTÉ), organised the national final Eurosong 2010 in order to select its entry for the contest. Five songs faced the votes of six regional juries and a public televote, ultimately resulting in the selection of "It's for You" performed by Niamh Kavanagh as the Irish Eurovision entry. Kavanagh had represented Ireland in 1993 with the song "In Your Eyes", and had won the contest.

Ireland was drawn to compete in the second semi-final of the Eurovision Song Contest which took place on 27 May 2010. Performing during the show in position 12, "It's for You" was announced among the top 10 entries of the second semi-final and therefore qualified to compete in the final on 29 May. It was later revealed that Ireland placed ninth out of the 17 participating countries in the semi-final with 67 points. In the final, Ireland performed in position 10 and placed twenty-third out of the 25 participating countries, scoring 25 points.

== Background ==
Prior to the 2010 contest, Raidió Teilifís Éireann (RTÉ) and its predecessor national broadcasters have participated in the Eurovision Song Contest representing Ireland forty-three times since RÉ's first entry in 1965. They have won the contest a record seven times in total. Their first win came in 1970, with "All Kinds of Everything" performed by Dana. Ireland holds the record for being the only country to win the contest three times in a row (in 1992, 1993, and 1994), as well as having the only three-time winner (Johnny Logan, who won in 1980 as a singer, 1987 as a singer-songwriter, and again in 1992 as a songwriter). The Irish entry in 2009, "Et Cetera" performed by Sinéad Mulvey and Black Daisy, failed to qualify to the final.

As part of its duties as participating broadcaster, RTÉ organises the selection of its entry in the Eurovision Song Contest and broadcasts the event in the country. The broadcaster confirmed its intentions to participate at the 2010 contest on 28 October 2009 following speculation that it may be forced to withdraw from the contest due to the economic downturn in the country. In 2008 and 2009, RTÉ had set up the national final Eurosong to choose both the song and performer to compete at Eurovision for Ireland, with both the public and regional jury groups involved in the selection. For the 2010 contest, RTÉ announced on 10 December 2009 the organisation of Eurosong 2010 to choose the artist and song.

== Before Eurovision ==
=== Eurosong 2010 ===
Eurosong 2010 was the national final format developed by RTÉ in order to select its entry for the Eurovision Song Contest 2010. The competition was held on 5 March 2010 at the Studio 4 of RTÉ in Dublin, hosted by Ryan Tubridy and broadcast on RTÉ One during a special edition of The Late Late Show. The show was also broadcast online via RTÉ's official website rte.ie and the official Eurovision Song Contest website eurovision.tv.

==== Competing entries ====
On 10 December 2009, RTÉ opened a submission period where artists and composers were able to submit their entries for the competition until 1 February 2010. Artists were also required to include their suggestions for the proposed performance or staging details of their songs. At the closing of the deadline, over 300 entries were received. Five finalists were selected by a five-member jury panel appointed by RTÉ: singer and former contest winner Linda Martin, Universal Music Ireland director Mark Crossingham, agent and choreographer Julian Benson, broadcaster Larry Gogan and chairman of OGAE Ireland Diarmuid Furlong. All of the submissions were evaluated based on criteria consisting of the suitability of the song for Eurovision, quality of the artist and suitability of the proposed artist-song combination; the jury reserved the right to match songs with different artists to the ones who submitted an entry. The finalists were announced on 10 February 2010, while their songs were presented on 4 March 2010 during The Derek Mooney Show on RTÉ Radio 1.

Artist	Song	Songwriter(s)
Leanne Moore	"Does Heaven Need Much More?"	John Waters, Tommy Moran
Lee Bradshaw	"River of Silence"	Ralph Siegel, John O'Flynn, José Juan Santana Rodríguez
Mikey Graham	"Baby, Nothing's Wrong"	Michael Graham, Scott Newman, Yann O'Brien
Monika Ivkic	"Fashion Queen"	Marc Paelinck, Mathias Strasser
Niamh Kavanagh	"It's for You"	Niall Mooney, Mårten Eriksson, Jonas Gladnikoff, Lina Eriksson

==== Final ====
The national final took place on 5 March 2010 and featured guest performances from former contest winners Dana Rosemary Scallon and Johnny Logan as well as commentary from a panel that consisted of Rosemary Scallon, Logan, former contestant Michael Ball and commentator Marty Whelan. Following the 50/50 combination of votes from six regional juries and public televoting, "It's for You" performed by Niamh Kavanagh was selected as the winner.

Final – 5 March 2010
R/O	Artist	Song	Jury	Televote	Total	Place
1	Leanne Moore	"Does Heaven Need Much More?"	42	36	78	4
2	Lee Bradshaw	"River of Silence"	26	24	50	5
3	Mikey Graham	"Baby, Nothing's Wrong"	50	60	110	2
4	Monika Ivkic	"Fashion Queen"	50	48	98	3
5	Niamh Kavanagh	"It's for You"	72	72	144	1

Detailed Regional Jury Votes
R/O	Song	Cork	Dundalk	Limerick	Sligo	Dublin	Galway	Total
1	"Does Heaven Need Much More?"	6	6	6	10	6	8	42
2	"River of Silence"	4	4	4	6	4	4	26
3	"Baby, Nothing's Wrong"	8	10	8	8	10	6	50
4	"Fashion Queen"	10	8	10	4	8	10	50
5	"It's for You"	12	12	12	12	12	12	72

== At Eurovision ==
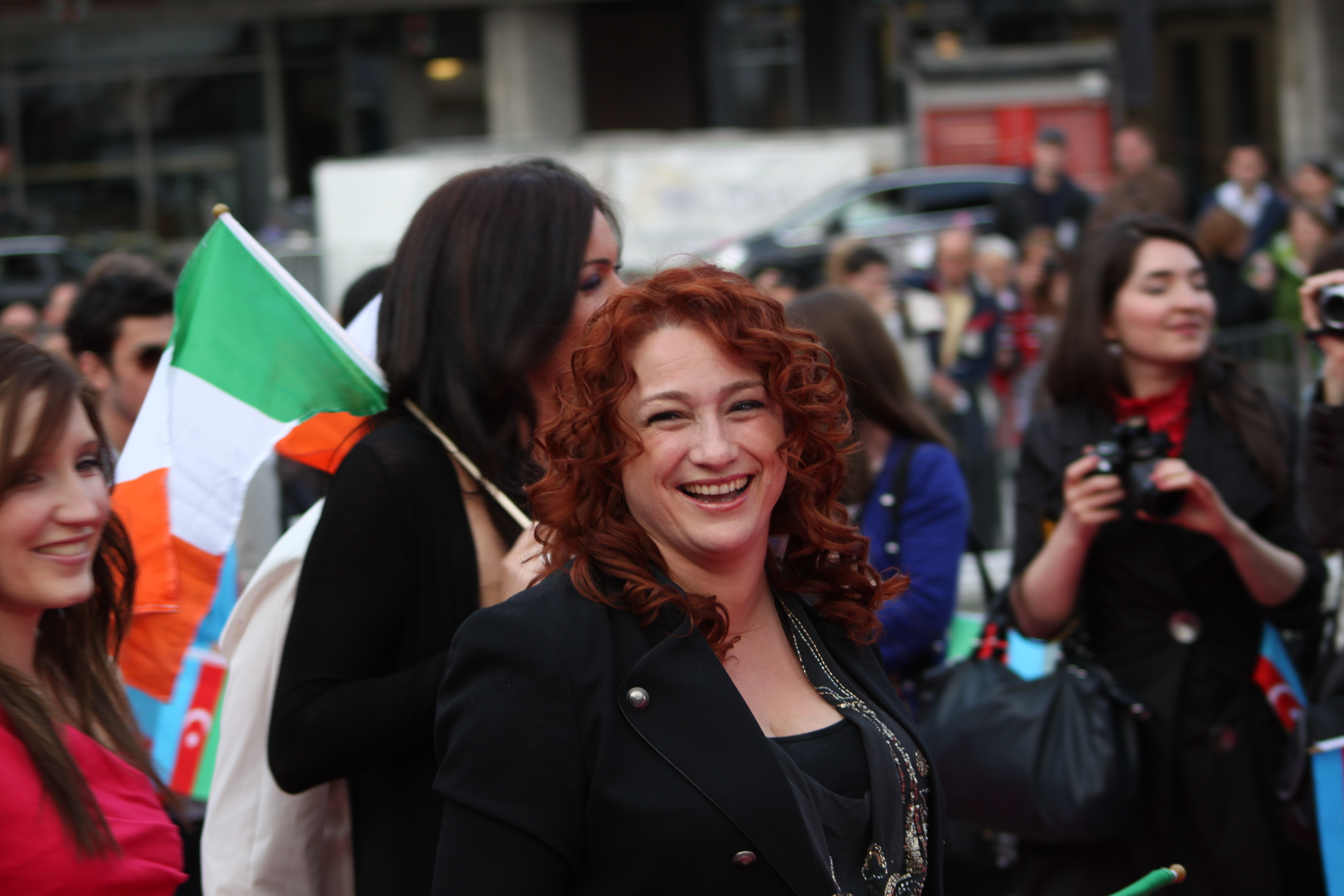
Niamh Kavanagh at the Eurovision Opening Party in Oslo

According to Eurovision rules, all nations with the exceptions of the host country and the "Big Four" (France, Germany, Spain and the United Kingdom) are required to qualify from one of two semi-finals in order to compete for the final; the top ten countries from each semi-final progress to the final. The European Broadcasting Union (EBU) split up the competing countries into six different pots based on voting patterns from previous contests, with countries with favourable voting histories put into the same pot. On 7 February 2010, a special allocation draw was held which placed each country into one of the two semi-finals, as well as which half of the show they would perform in. Ireland was placed into the second semi-final, to be held on 27 May 2010, and was scheduled to perform in the second half of the show. The running order for the semi-finals was decided through another draw on 23 March 2010 and Ireland was set to perform in position 12, following the entry from Slovenia and before the entry from Bulgaria.

In Ireland, the semi-finals and the final were broadcast on RTÉ One with commentary by Marty Whelan. The second semi-final and final were also broadcast via radio on RTÉ Radio 1 with commentary by former contestant Maxi. The Irish spokesperson, who announced the Irish votes during the final, was Derek Mooney.

=== Semi-final ===
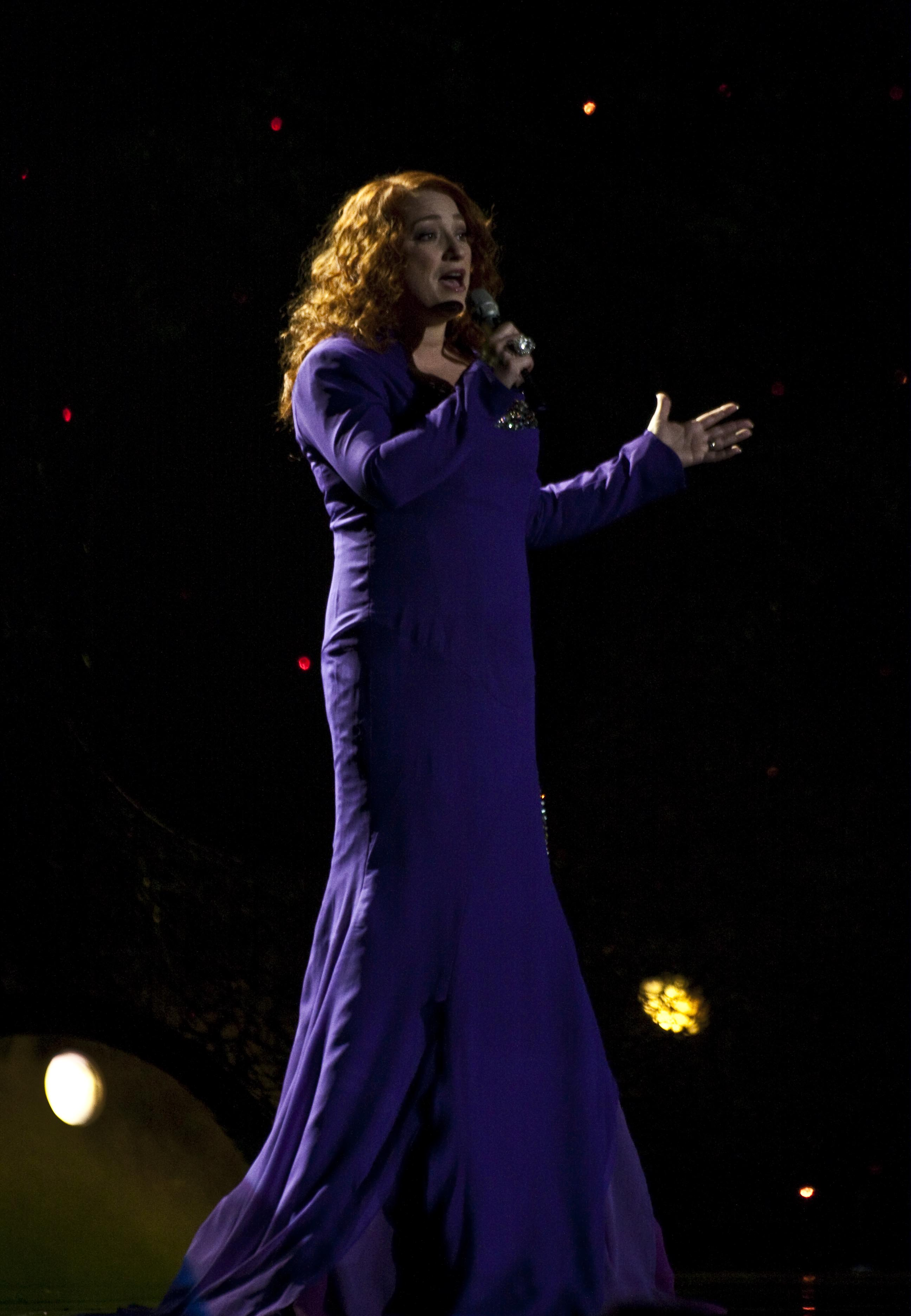
Niamh Kavanagh during a rehearsal before the second semi-final

Niamh Kavanagh took part in technical rehearsals on 19 and 23 May, followed by dress rehearsals on 11 and 12 May. This included the jury show on 11 May where the professional juries of each country watched and voted on the competing entries.

The Irish performance featured Niamh Kavanagh in a purple dress with Swarovski crystals. The stage lighting began with a single spotlight, which changed to an emerald colour and lastly a golden hue across the entire stage. The performance also featured smoke effects and the use of a wind machine. Kavanagh was joined on stage by four backing vocalists, one of them which also played the flute: Ed O'Leary, Karl Power, Nikki Kavanagh and the first cousin of Kavanagh who also bears the same name.

At the end of the show, Ireland was announced as having finished in the top 10 and consequently qualifying for the grand final. It was later revealed that Ireland placed ninth in the semi-final, receiving a total of 67 points.

=== Final ===
Shortly after the second semi-final, a winners' press conference was held for the ten qualifying countries. As part of this press conference, the qualifying artists took part in a draw to determine the running order for the final and Ireland was drawn to perform in position 10, following the entry from Belarus and before the entry from Greece.

Niamh Kavanagh once again took part in dress rehearsals on 28 and 29 May before the final, including the jury final where the professional juries cast their final votes before the live show. Niamh Kavanagh performed a repeat of her semi-final performance during the final on 29 May. Ireland placed twenty-third in the final, scoring 25 points.

=== Voting ===
Voting during the three shows consisted of 50 percent public televoting and 50 percent from a jury deliberation. The jury consisted of five music industry professionals who were citizens of the country they represent. This jury was asked to judge each contestant based on: vocal capacity; the stage performance; the song's composition and originality; and the overall impression by the act. In addition, no member of a national jury could be related in any way to any of the competing acts in such a way that they cannot vote impartially and independently.

Following the release of the full split voting by the EBU after the conclusion of the competition, it was revealed that Ireland had placed thirteenth with the public televote and sixth with the jury vote in the second semi-final. In the public vote, Ireland scored 43 points, while with the jury vote, Ireland scored 84 points. In the final, Ireland had placed twenty-fourth with the public televote and sixteenth with the jury vote. In the public vote, Ireland scored 15 points, while with the jury vote, Ireland scored 62 points.

Below is a breakdown of points awarded to Ireland and awarded by Ireland in the second semi-final and grand final of the contest. The nation awarded its 12 points to Lithuania in the semi-final and to Denmark in the final of the contest.

==== Points awarded to Ireland ====
Points awarded to Ireland (Semi-final 2)
Score	Country
12 points	Switzerland
10 points	United Kingdom
8 points	Netherlands
7 points	Lithuania
6 points	Denmark; Norway
5 points	
4 points	Azerbaijan; Romania
3 points	Croatia; Israel
2 points	Slovenia
1 point	Armenia; Turkey

Points awarded to Ireland (Final)
Score	Country
12 points	
10 points	
8 points	
7 points	United Kingdom
6 points	Israel; Switzerland
5 points	
4 points	
3 points	
2 points	Estonia; Germany
1 point	Croatia; Finland

==== Points awarded by Ireland ====
Points awarded by Ireland (Semi-final 2)
Score	Country
12 points	Lithuania
10 points	Azerbaijan
8 points	Turkey
7 points	Georgia
6 points	Romania
5 points	Sweden
4 points	Denmark
3 points	Netherlands
2 points	Ukraine
1 point	Croatia

Points awarded by Ireland (Final)
Score	Country
12 points	Denmark
10 points	Belgium
8 points	Germany
7 points	Romania
6 points	France
5 points	Georgia
4 points	United Kingdom
3 points	Azerbaijan
2 points	Norway
1 point	Turkey
