= Jonas Gladnikoff =

Swedish songwriter and music producer (born 1985)

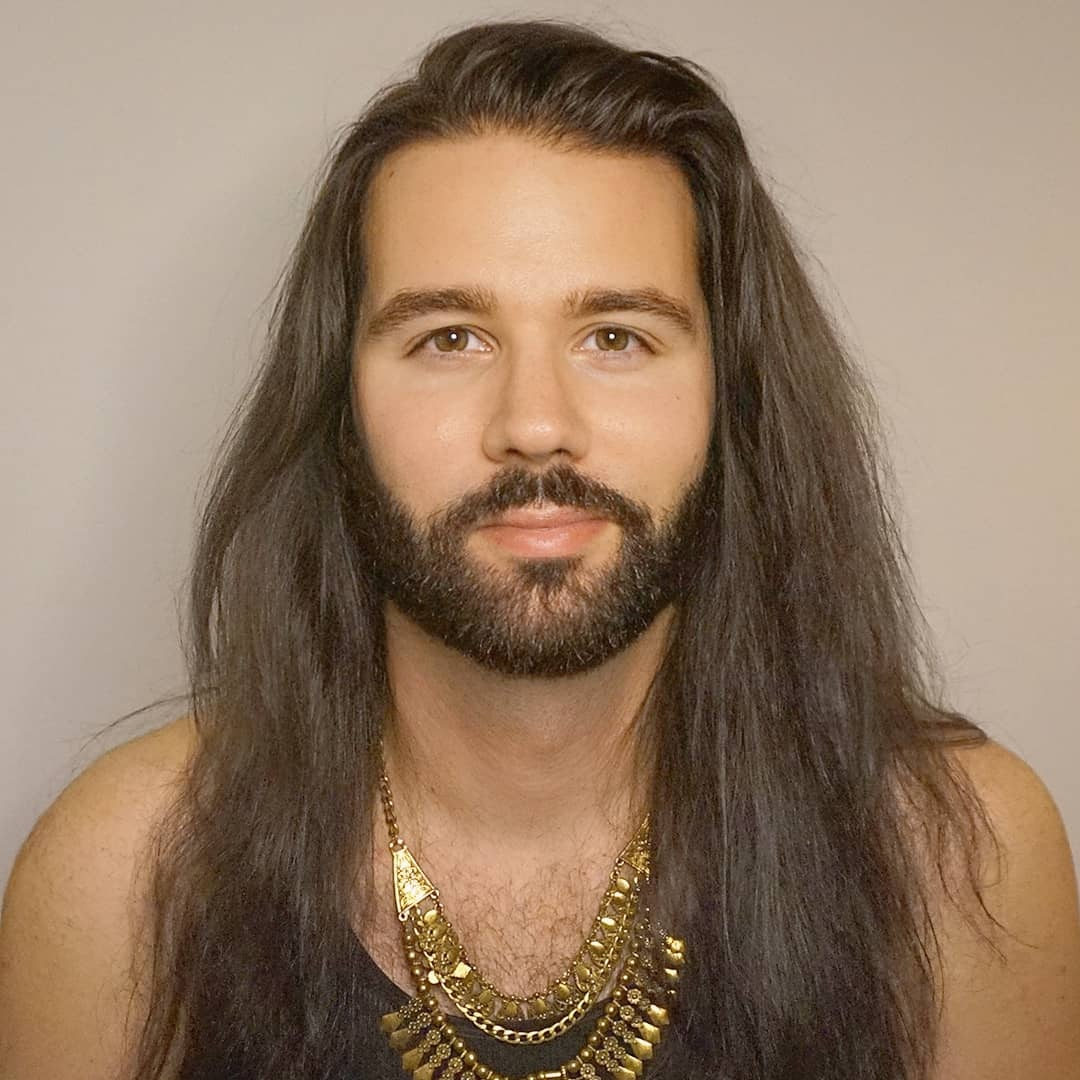

Background information
- Born: 11 January 1985 (age 41); Stockholm, Sweden
- Genres: Pop; electroswing
- Occupations: Songwriter, music producer
- Years active: 2006-present

Jonas Gladnikoff (born 11 January 1985) is a Swedish songwriter and music producer. Born in Täby, he began songwriting at an early age. Later in life he moved to Åland in Finland before eventually moving to Stockholm. He has written several songs for singers from across Europe, but is best known for writing entries for the Eurovision Song Contest, the Junior Eurovision Song Contest, and for various national pre-selections. He studied songwriting at the Music Production Academy Musikmakarna, graduating in 2006. He co-wrote the songs that represented Ireland in 2009, 2010 and 2014: "Et Cetera" performed by Sinéad Mulvey & Black Daisy, "It's for You", performed by 1993 Eurovision winning Niamh Kavanagh, and "Heartbeat" sung by Can-linn.

Among his entries in national pre-selections for the Eurovision Song Contest he is best known for having co-written the runner up in the Dansk Melodi Grand Prix 2009, the Danish final, with the song "Someday" performed by the Icelandic singer Hera Björk, which became a big hit and also won the OGAE Second Chance Contest 2009 for Denmark. Gladnikoff is a member of the jazz pop project Technicoloured Roses. In 2021 he co-wrote and produced the song Llévame al cielo released by Drag Race España host Supremme de Luxe and which was later also used as the final challenge of the second season of the show where the top four recorded their own version of the song.

== Entries in the Eurovision Song Contest ==
- (Republic of Ireland) "Et Cetera" by Sinéad Mulvey & Black Daisy, Ireland, (Eurovision Song Contest 2009), 11th place (Semi-final)
- (Republic of Ireland) "It's for You" by Niamh Kavanagh, Ireland, (Eurovision Song Contest 2010), 23rd place (Final)
- (Republic of Ireland) "Heartbeat" by Can-linn feat. Kasey Smith, Ireland, (Eurovision Song Contest 2014), 12th place (Semi-final)

== Entries in the Junior Eurovision Song Contest ==
- (Republic of Ireland) "Réalta na mara" by Aimee Banks, Ireland, (Junior Eurovision Song Contest 2015), 12th place
- (Republic of Ireland) "IOU" by Taylor Hynes, Ireland, (Junior Eurovision Song Contest 2018), 15th place
- (Republic of Ireland) "Banshee" by Anna Kearney, Ireland, (Junior Eurovision Song Contest 2019), 12th place
- (Republic of Ireland) "Solas" by Sophie Lennon, Ireland, (Junior Eurovision Song Contest 2022), 4th place

== Entries in national Eurovision pre-selections ==
2006

- "Po dhe jo" by Ingrid Jushi (Albania 2006), eliminated (Semi-final)

2007

- "Open your eyes" by Charlene & Natasha (Bulgaria 2007), eliminated (Semi-final)
- "I Will Survive Without You" by Edgaras Kapocious (Lithuania 2007), 10th place (Quarter-final)

2009

- "Someday" by Hera Björk (Denmark 2009), 2nd place
- (Republic of Ireland) "Et Cetera" by Sinéad Mulvey & Black Daisy (Ireland 2009), 1st place

2010

- "Tonight" by Kafka & Ruta (Lithuania 2010), 4th place (Semi-final)
- (Republic of Ireland) "It's for You" by Niamh Kavanagh (Ireland 2010), 1st place

2011

- "Topsy Turvy" by J.Anvil (Malta 2011), 10th place
- (Republic of Ireland) "Falling" by Nikki Kavanagh (Ireland 2011), 2nd place
- "Sueños rotos" by Melissa (Spain 2011), 5th place
- "Volver" by Auryn (Spain 2011), 2nd place
- "Tensão" by Filipa Ruas (Portugal 2011), 4th place

2012

- "This Must Be Love" by Ana Mardare (Romania 2012), 13th place

2013

- "Meðal Andanna" by Birgitta Haukdal (Iceland 2013), 3rd place
- "Fool In Love" by Davids & Dinara (Latvia 2013), 11th place
- "Hullócsillag" by Mónika Hoffmann (Hungary 2013), eliminated (Semi-final)
- "Conquer My Heart" by Svetlana Bogdanova (Moldova 2013), 11th place
- "I Believe In Love" by Diana Hetea (Romania 2013), 12th place (Semi-final)

2014

- "Silent Tears" by VIG Roses (Lithuania 2014)
- (Republic of Ireland) "Heartbeat" by Can-linn feat. Kasey Smith (Ireland 2014), 1st place

2015

- "Right In" by Emily Charalambous (Cyprus 2015), 11th place
- "Sound of Colours" by Jurgis Bruzga (Lithuania 2015), 5th place

2016

- "All Around the World" by Deborah C (Malta 2016), 11th place
- "Fire Burn" by Dominic (Malta 2016), 13th place
- "Falling Glass" by Corazon (Malta 2016), 8th place
- "Who Needs a Heart?" by Kristel Lisberg (Denmark 2016), unplaced
- "Good Enough" by Annica Milán & Kimmo Blom (Finland 2016), 5th place
- "Superhuman" by Xandra (Romania 2016), eliminated (Semi-final)

2017

- "Tonight" by Deborah C & Josef Tabone (Malta 2017), 7th place
- "Victorious" by Virgis Valuntonis (Lithuania 2017), eliminated (Semi-final)
- "Walk On By" by Xandra (Romania 2017), 5th place

2018

- "Back to Life" by Eleanor Cassar (Malta 2018), 5th place
- "Call 2morrow" by Matthew Anthony (Malta 2018), 7th place
- "We Can Run" by Avenue Sky (Malta 2018), 9th place
- "A Thousand Times" by Angie Ott (Switzerland 2018), 5th place
- "Devoted" by Johnny Bădulescu (Romania 2018), 4th place (Semi-final)
- "Thinking About You" by Endless feat. Maria Grosu (Romania 2018) 6th place (Semi-final)
- "Try" by Xandra (Romania 2018), 9th place
- "Heaven" by MIHAI (Romania 2018), 7th place
- "The Voice" by Suren Poghosyan (Armenia 2018), 10th place (Semi-final)
- "Dišem" by Nina Petković (Montenegro 2018), 5th place
- "Aldrei gefast upp"/"Battleline" by Fókus (Iceland 2018), 5th place

2019

- "Weight of the World" by Nicola (Romania 2019), eliminated (Semi-final)
- "I Will Not Surrender" by Maxim Zavidia (Moldova 2019), 2nd place

2022

- "Naked" by Leya Leanne (Slovenia 2022), 9th place
- "Guilty" by Møise (Romania 2022), 10th place

2023

- "Love Again" by Skrellex (Norway 2023), 7th place
- "Indestructible" by Cosmina (Moldova 2023), 8th place
- "Haunted" by Lyndsay (Malta 2023), eliminated (Quarter-final)
- "Creeping Walls" by Nathan (Malta 2023), 11th place
- "Whatever Wind May Blow" by Dominic Cini & Anna Azzopardi (Malta 2023), eliminated (Semi-final)
- "Love You Like That" by Jake (Malta 2023), eliminated (Quarter-final)

2024

- "Fever" by Cătălina Solomac (Moldova 2024), 4th place
- "Return" by Mark (San Marino 2024), eliminated (Semi-final)

2025

- "Ég flýg í storminn"/"Stormchaser" by Birgo (Iceland 2025), eliminated (Semi-final)

== Entries in national Junior Eurovision pre-selections ==
2015

- (Republic of Ireland) "Réalta na mara" by Aimee Banks, Ireland, (Ireland 2015), 1st place

2018

- (Republic of Ireland) "IOU" by Taylor Hynes, Ireland, (Ireland 2018), 1st place

2021

- "Change" by Yulan Law (Malta 2021), Unplaced

== Other songwriting credits (highlights) ==
- Cho Yong Pil - Timing (2024)
- Hugo One - Summer Palpitations (2024)
- He Junlin - Eyes For You (2023)
- Skrellex - Shake This Dress Away (2023)
- Finalists of Drag Race España (season 1) - Llévame al cielo (2022)
- Huang Shengyi, Zhong Lit and the cast of Hi! Hot Mom - 女王的调性 (2022)
- Steve Steinman - Journey Home (2021)
- Supremme de Luxe - Llévame al cielo (2021)
- Avenue Sky - When the Sun Shines (2021)
- Smoke Rings Sisters - Vårt eget Göteborg (2021)
- Titanix - Vad du ser är vad du får (2020)
- Nina Petković - Dance Till I Die (2020)
- Annica Milán - Better alone (2019)
- Claudia Faniello, Dominic Cini & various artists... - Roll the Dice (2019)
- Sergey Lazarev - Flying (2018)
- Titanix - Snöfall (2018)
- Smoke Rings Sisters - Welcome To Our World (2017)
- Annica Milán - Thunder (2017)
- Annica Milán and Kimmo Blom - Take me as I am (2017)
- TWiiNS - Latino Love (2016)
- Diva Houston - Fabulosa B*tch! (2016)
- Annica Milán and Kimmo Blom - Rhyme or reason (2016)
- Leo Aquilla - Love Devotion (2016)
- Supremme de Luxe - Getting High (2016)
- Supremme de Luxe - EnerG (2016)
- Amina Annabi feat. MaJiKer - Nour Reborn (2015)
- MAX - Heartbreaker (2015)
- La Pelopony - Me Anticipo (2015)
- Supremme de Luxe - Candy Shop (2015)
- Jasmyn - In my is somer (2013)
- Technicoloured Roses - Keep On Playing (2013)
- Technicoloured Roses - I Wanna Dance The Go Go (2013)
- Technicoloured Roses - Oboe (2013)
- Technicoloured Roses - Tippy Toe (2013)
- Technicoloured Roses - I Got A Beat (2013)
- Titanix & Magnus Bäcklund - Now or Never (2012)
- Hera Björk - Mína eigin leið (2011)
- Titanix - Night by the lake (2011)
- Erna Hrönn - Like Pantomime (2010)
- Hera Björk - Because You Can (2010)
