= Malung Sälen Party =

Malung Sälen Party (Malung-Sälenpartiet) is a local political party in Malung, Sweden. The party was founded in 2005. The chairperson of the party is a former Centre Party member, Ann-Louise Eklund.
