= Camilla Gottschalck =

Danish composer, singer, and musician

- Born: 2 January 1977 (age 48); Holbæk, Denmark

Camilla Gottschalck is a Danish composer, singer, and musician.

She has a musical education as a singer and musician (drums, piano). Camilla Gottschalck has also many years of experience as a composer. She has been a lead singer in several soul/pop/acoustic bands, a member of various choirs and she is often hired as a backing singer on studio recordings. She has worked with many internationally known producers, songwriters and musicians throughout the past years.

== Composer ==
Camilla Gottschalck has written songs for many international artists. Amongst them is Hera Björk, with whom she co-wrote Heras winning song "Because You Can" in Vina Del Mar 2013. during the years she has worked with artists such as Icelandic Erna Hrönn, the Swedish group Titanix and DQ.

In ESC 2013 she has co-written songs like "Fool In Love" performed by Dāvids Kalandija and Dināra in the Latvian national final and in Moldova, Svetlana Bogdanova performed the song "Conquer My Heart" in the first semifinal. In 2012 she had the song "Run" with Eva Boto, in the Slovenian preselection for the Eurovision Song Contest. And back in 2011 Camilla had her ESC Debut by participating in the Irish preselection with the song "Falling" performed by Nikki Kavanagh. Later that same year, with two songs in the Spanish preselection for Eurovision Song Contest, "Sueños rotos" performed by Melissa Canta and "Volver" performed by Auryn. This last song was also on Auryns award-winning album, "Endless Road, 7058".
Previously she performed in the Irish Eurovision preselection "Et Cetera", 2009 as a backing vocalist, as well as in the Danish Eurovision preselection on stage with Hera Björk and the song "Someday", 2009.
She is also a member and vocalist of the jazz pop project Technicoloured Roses. Together with Christina Schilling she is the owner of Pixieland Productions.

== Actress ==
Educated in Meisner technique at Skuespillerskolen Ophelia in Copenhagen, the only professional actors academy in Europe with a foundation in Meisner Technique.
Camilla Gottschalck has for instance worked with and is trained by Sarah Boberg, Pia Bovin, Lane Lind, Jesper Lohmann, Ken Vedsegaard, Inge Dinesen, Finn Hesselager, Mei Oulund, Bronwen Loshak and Peter Dupont Weiss.
Her work as an actress include roles in theatre plays, films and radio theatre plays and also worked with dubbing and speaks. Furthermore, Camilla Gottschalck has an extensive experience as an author and actress in interactive theatre for clients such as DSB, Rehfeld and Slots- og Ejendomsstyrelsen.
