= Technicoloured Roses =

Danish-Swedish band

- Origin: Copenhagen, Denmark & Stockholm, Sweden
- Genres: Jazz, pop, dance, swing, electronic jazz
- Years active: 2011–present
- Members: Christina Schilling, Camilla Gottschalck, Jonas Gladnikoff
- Website: http://technicolouredroses.com/

Technicoloured Roses are a Danish-Swedish jazz pop project established in 2010. Its current members are Jonas Gladnikoff, Camilla Gottschalck and Christina Schilling, people otherwise mostly known for their songwriting and acting career. They released their first EP "Planet of the Roses" in 2012. In 2013 they signed the song "Keep on Playing" to record label 100 Songs. The single, which features several guest musicians, was released in 2013.

== Discography ==
=== Studio albums ===
- 2012: Planet Of The Roses

=== Singles ===
- 2013: Keep On Playing
