= Pixieland (Dartmoor) =

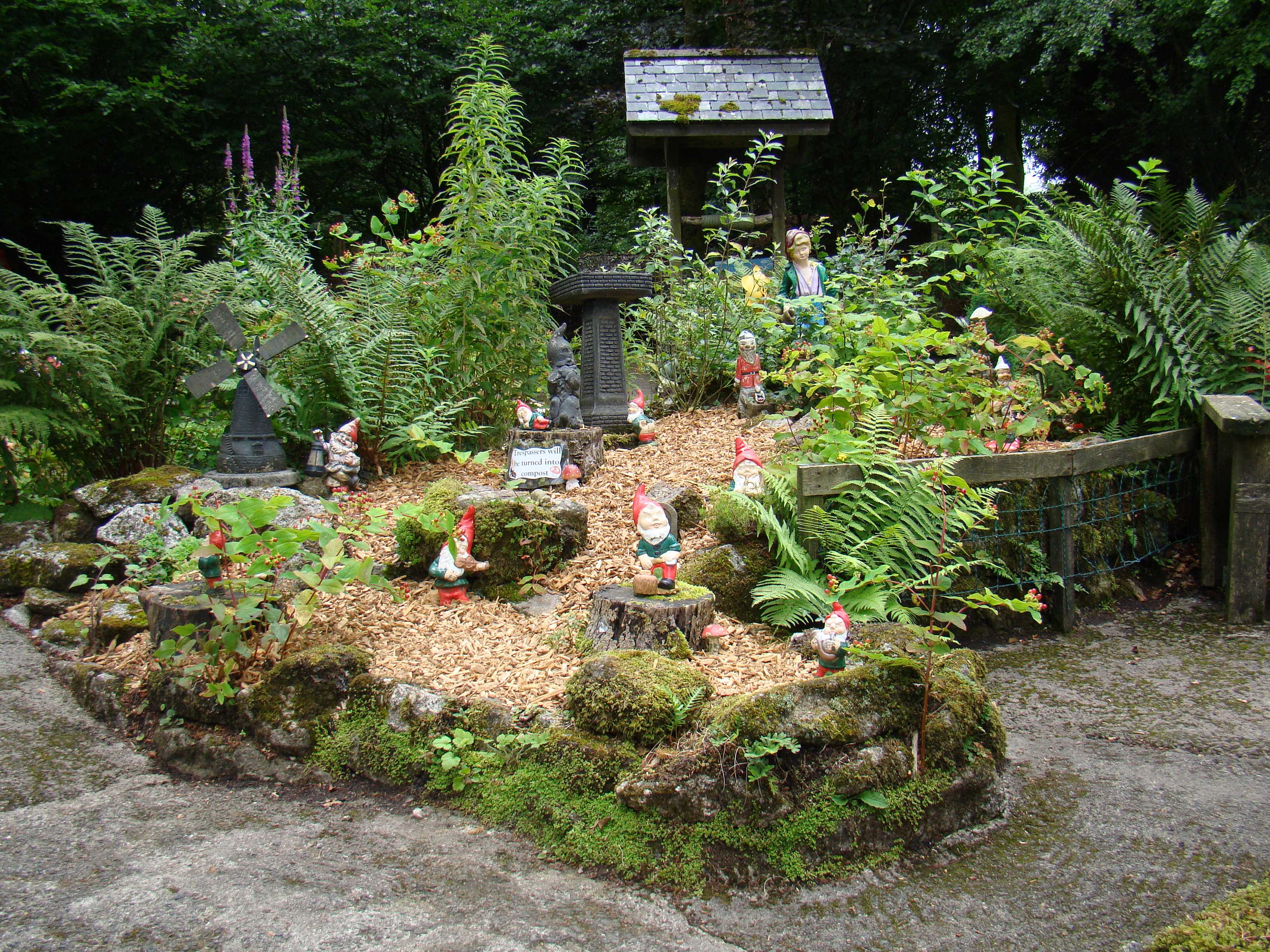
- Interactive map of Pixieland
- Location: Devon, England
- Coordinates: 50°32′46″N 3°52′56″W
- Opened: 1947
- Owner: Glynis and Keri Leader
- Operating season: All year round
- Website: www.pixieland.co.uk

Pixieland is in Dartmoor National Park, Devon and is a visitor attraction, garden gnome manufacturer and retailer. It was founded by Ken Ruth in 1947. It has gardens free of charge for visitors which are full of the gnomes, pixies and other fantasy creatures that have been made on the premises since its founding.
Pixieland is on the site of Dartmoor's 'Pixies Holt', an historical place for legends of pixie sightings.
The figures continue to be sold in the shop and are hand-made mainly using moulds of the original 1947 gnomes.
From the 1960s, they started to sell Devon sheepskin products in order to supplement the seasonal nature of the business.
