= Svenska dansbandsveckan =

Coordinates: 60.6908°N 13.7222°E

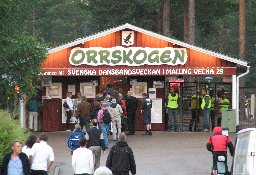
- The Orrskogen during the 2008 event
- Genre: dansband music
- Dates: Week 29
- Locations: Malung, Sweden
- Years active: 1986-present

Svenska dansbandsveckan is a dansband music festival in the Orrskogen folkpark of Malung, Sweden. It's held every Week 29. The event was first held in 1986. It is usually opened with the Guldklaven Awards being awarded.

In 2012, the event was visited by around 50,700 people, which meant a new record had been broken.
