= Titanix =

Swedish dansband

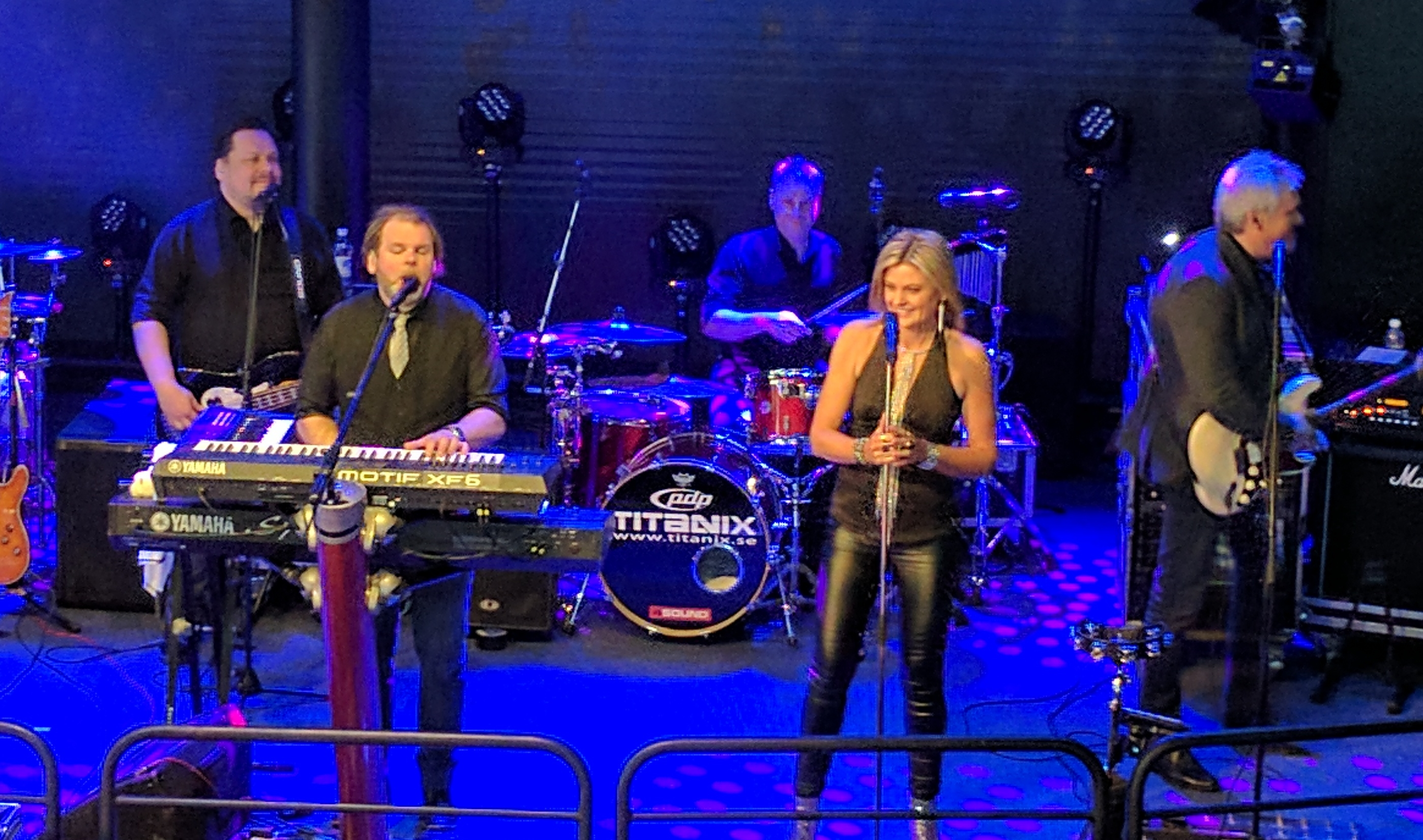
- Titanix, 2017

Background information
- Origin: Valdemarsvik, Sweden
- Genres: Dansband music
- Years active: 1979–
- Website: titanix.se

Titanix is a dansband, established in 1979 in Valdemarsvik, Sweden. The band appeared at the finals of the Swedish dansband championships in 1997 and 2001, before finishing up at the second place during Dansbandskampen 2009. During their 2009 Dansbandskampen appearance, it was mentioned that the band was not named after the boat RMS Titanic that sank in 1912, but rather an ice hockey stick.

== Members ==
- Maria Rolf (vocals)
- Stefan Rolf (guitar, vocals)
- Jerry Rolf (keyboard, vocals)
- Magnus Löfving (drums, vocals)
- Henry Kieksi (bass, vocals)
- Alyssa Kockauski (drums, synthesizer)

== Discography ==
=== Albums ===
- Livs levande – 1996
- Hela världen – 2006
- Drömmar får liv – 2010
- Mitt i ett andetag – 2011
- Genom natten – 2012
- Om då var nu – 2014

=== Singlar ===
- Av allt det vackra jag sett 1995
- Längtan 1997
- Allt för mig 1999
- 1.2.3 gånger om' 2001
- Här hos mig 2002
- Flickor är flickor, pojkar är pojkar 2004
- Finally Free 2006
- Ingen som du 2008
- Try to Catch Me 2009
- Allt jag vill ha 2010

=== Cassette tapes ===
- Vol. 1 1988
- Live på Oléo i Växjö 1991
- Live i studio 92 1992

== Svensktoppen songs ==
- 1.2.3 gånger om – 2001
- Här hos mig – 2002
