= Sinéad Mulvey =

Irish singer and flight attendant (born 1988)

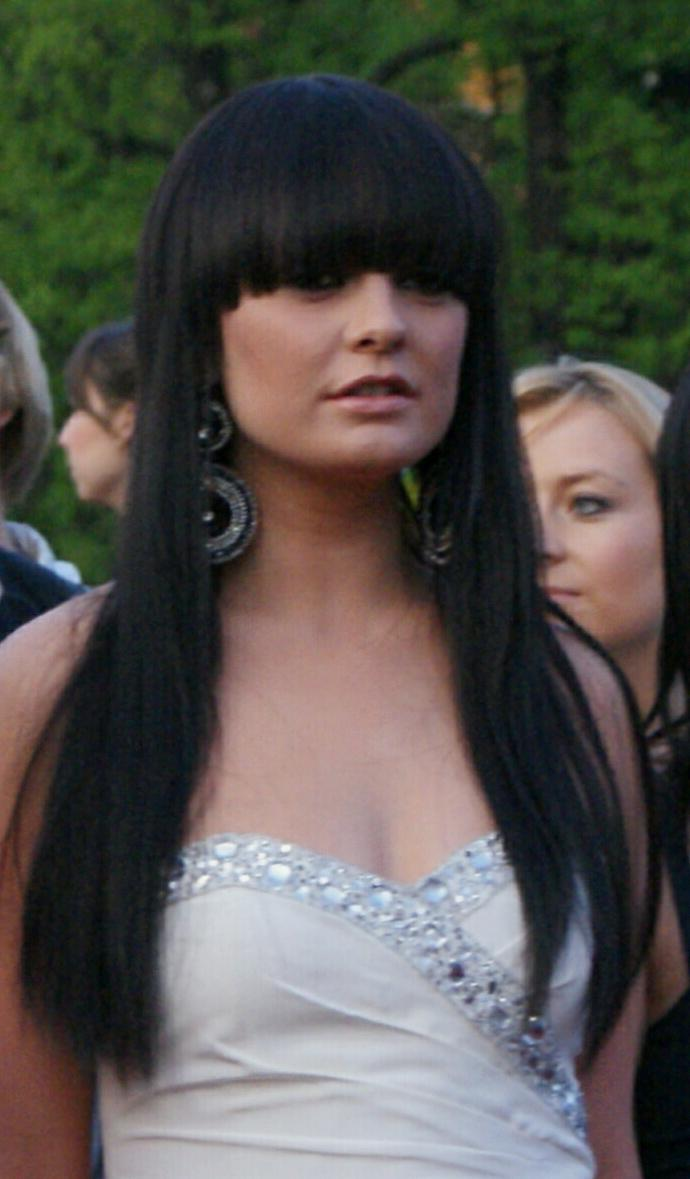

Background information
- Born: Sinéad Mulvey; 22 January 1988 (age 38)
- Origin: Ireland
- Genres: Pop, rock, musical
- Occupations: Flight attendant, singer
- Instrument: Vocals
- Years active: 2005–present

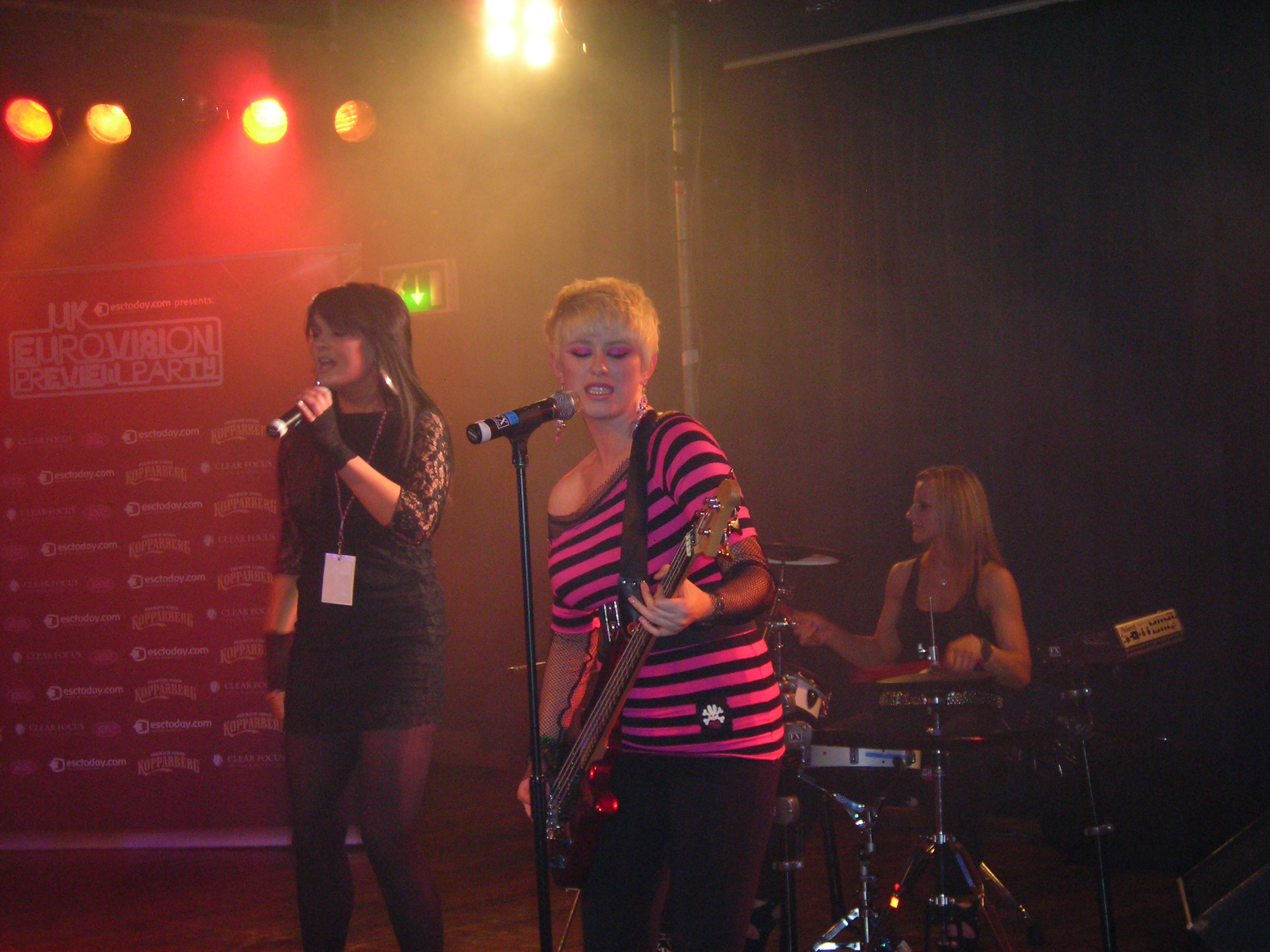
Black Daisy with Sinéad Mulvey performing "Et Cetera" at the Scala in London on 17 April 2009.

Sinéad Mulvey (born 22 January 1988) is an Irish singer and flight attendant. Alongside Black Daisy, she represented her country at the Eurovision Song Contest 2009 with the pop-rock song "Et Cetera". The song was performed in the second semi-final but missed out on qualification to the grand final.

Mulvey appeared on You're a Star prior to Eurovision 2009, but missed out on the final.

== Biography ==
=== Early life ===
Sinéad started singing at the age of thirteen, as she was picked as the star role in the musical Cinderella. In 2005 she competed in RTÉ's talent show You're a Star.

She works as a flight attendant with Aer Lingus.

=== Eurovision 2009 ===
The deadline for submissions for the Irish selection process for the Eurovision Song Contest 2009 was 2 February 2009, with RTÉ inviting entries from as early as 20 December 2008. On 20 February 2009, Sinéad, alongside rock band Black Daisy, won the Irish pre-selection for the Eurovision Song Contest 2009 in Moscow, Russia. Sinéad and Black Daisy beat off competition from five other contenders in "The Late Late Show Eurosong Special", receiving 78 points out of a possible 80, to earn the right to represent Ireland in Moscow. Mulvey was described as "shocked but honoured" at the triumph.

Arriving in Moscow with the RTÉ delegation prior to the semi-finals, Mulvey was photographed at various locations around the city in the company of Black Daisy and Irish Eurovision television commentator Marty Whelan and radio commentator Larry Gogan. Mulvey attired herself in a variety of costumes throughout the rehearsal period but settled for hair extensions and a black "rock chick" outfit in the style of Katy Perry meets Avril Lavigne for the semi-final performance.

The pop-rock entry "Et Cetera" was performed second during the second semi-final in Moscow's Olimpiysky Indoor Arena on 14 May 2009 but failed to reach the final. They had been the only girl band in the entire competition in 2009 and the performance had been in front of an audience of 20,000. Despite the eventual loss, the audience gave them a "rousing applause". The act received a total of 52 points finishing in 11th place.

Mulvey told the radio show Morning Ireland, "We were so close to tenth place. We gave our heart and soul into that performance.". The singer has since said that herself and the band had received various offers, requests and invitations.

Awards and achievements
Preceded by Dustin the Turkey with "Irelande Douze Pointe"	Ireland in the Eurovision Song Contest (with Black Daisy); 2009	Succeeded by Niamh Kavanagh with "It's for You"
