= Malung =

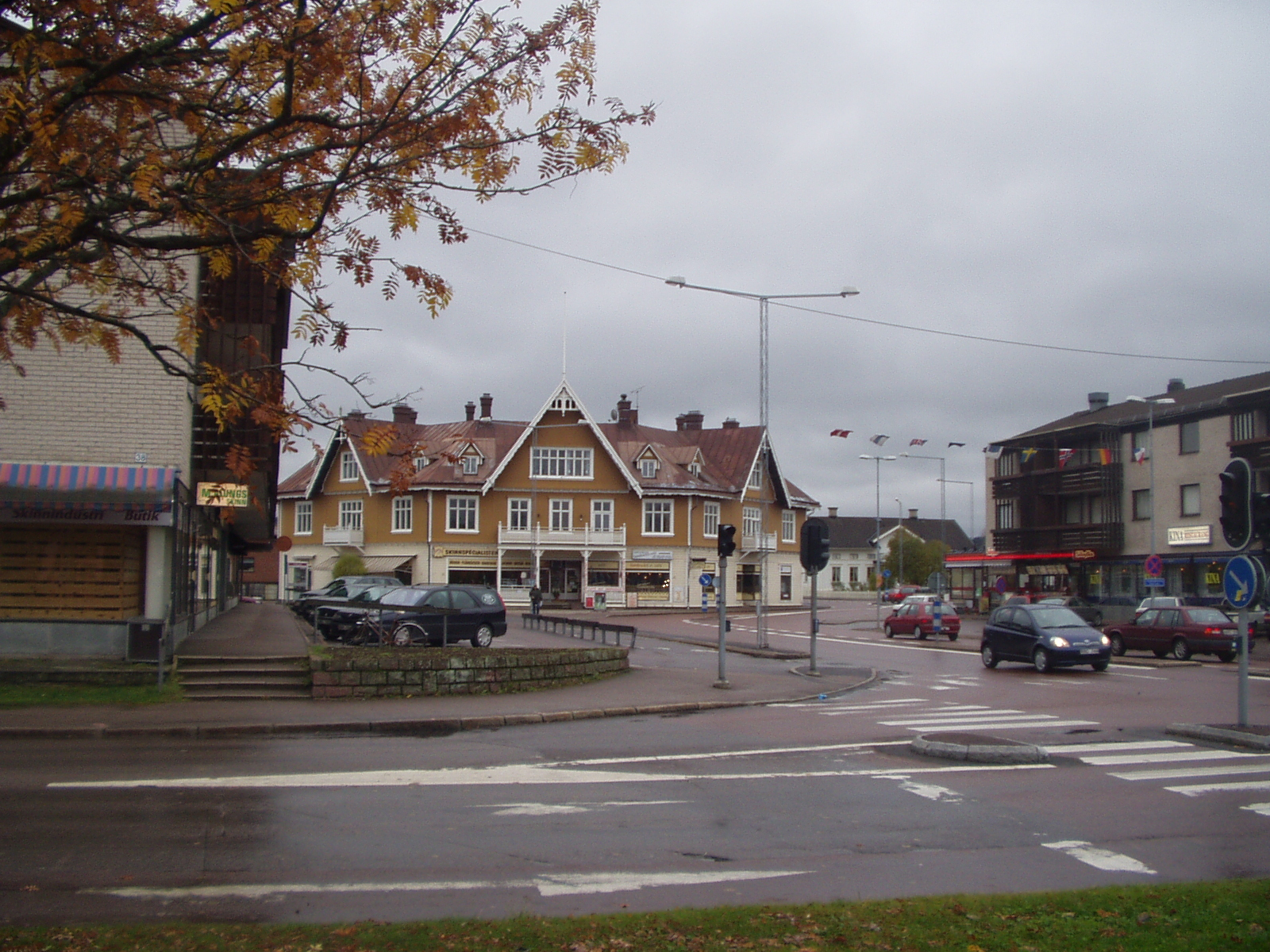
- Central Malung

- Location within Dalarna Location within Sweden
- Coordinates: 60°41′N 13°44′E
- Country: Sweden
- Province: Dalarna
- County: Dalarna County
- Municipality: Malung-Sälen Municipality

Area
  - Total: 9.39 km^{2} (3.63 sq mi)

Population (31 December 2010)
  - Total: 5,126
  - Density: 546/km^{2} (1,410/sq mi)
- Time zone: UTC+1 (CET)
  - Summer (DST): UTC+2 (CEST)

Malung is a locality and the seat of Malung-Sälen Municipality, Dalarna County, Sweden, with 5,126 inhabitants as of 2010.

== Overview ==
Malung is home to Malungs Folkhögskola, two kilometers south of the town centre. Specialized courses include folk music, dance, mountaineering, blacksmithing and health. Malung is also where the first DreamHack event took place.

In the 29th week of every year, Malung is host to Svenska dansbandsveckan, an annual dance festival that regularly brings over 3000 caravans as well as more than 80 performing bands to the community. Every year around 50,000 tickets are sold.

== History ==
The oldest written source mentioning Malung is the Sverre Saga from the 13th Century. The mill wheel manufacturing in the area is supposed to be centuries older than that.

The history of Malung as a village or settlement precedes local recorded history. It is however mentioned in the 13:th century tale "Sverres saga" that the Norwegian king Sverre Sigurdsson rode through a town named "Molung" while passing through Jarnberaland (swe: järnbäraland, "iron-bearing land", a part of modern-day Dalarna) in the year 1177. The locals were described as friendly and helpful although heathen due to their belief in Aesir faith or old Nordic religion. This makes Malung the first settlement in Dalarna to be recorded in text.

In addition to the locality's own history one of several millstone quarries can be found approximately five kilometers south-east of the town centre. The quarry is 1700 meters long, 50–170 meters wide and it has been active since the early Viking Age based on finds dated to the later half of the eighth century. Millstones cut in this quarry has been found as far south as Lund as well as in Mälardalen, most parts of Svealand and even Norway. The quarry is a culture reserve as of 2003.

In more recent history, Malung is known as the leather capital of Sweden, with its leather industry and several tanneries. Malung also has a proud and old tradition of so-called "skinners" or "skinnare": groups of leather merchants, tailors and tanners who would walk between villages to create and sell pelts, leather jackets and even shoes in exchange for accommodation and a modest pay.

== Climate ==
Malung has a relatively moderate subarctic climate not far below continental. In comparison with areas further east in the county like Falun, temperatures are generally chilly. Cold extremes in particular are very cold compared to elsewhere this far south in the country.

Climate data for Malung (2002–2018; extremes since 1916)
| Month | Jan | Feb | Mar | Apr | May | Jun | Jul | Aug | Sep | Oct | Nov | Dec | Year |
|---|---|---|---|---|---|---|---|---|---|---|---|---|---|
| Record high °C (°F) | 8.3 (46.9) | 11.1 (52.0) | 16.4 (61.5) | 24.5 (76.1) | 27.6 (81.7) | 31.4 (88.5) | 31.4 (88.5) | 32.1 (89.8) | 27.0 (80.6) | 20.3 (68.5) | 14.1 (57.4) | 10.1 (50.2) | 32.1 (89.8) |
| Mean maximum °C (°F) | 4.5 (40.1) | 5.4 (41.7) | 11.3 (52.3) | 16.7 (62.1) | 23.5 (74.3) | 25.7 (78.3) | 27.4 (81.3) | 25.7 (78.3) | 20.7 (69.3) | 14.9 (58.8) | 9.3 (48.7) | 5.4 (41.7) | 28.6 (83.5) |
| Mean daily maximum °C (°F) | −3.1 (26.4) | −1.4 (29.5) | 3.4 (38.1) | 9.4 (48.9) | 15.3 (59.5) | 19.0 (66.2) | 21.6 (70.9) | 19.4 (66.9) | 14.9 (58.8) | 7.8 (46.0) | 2.3 (36.1) | −1.5 (29.3) | 8.9 (48.0) |
| Daily mean °C (°F) | −6.9 (19.6) | −5.7 (21.7) | −2.0 (28.4) | 3.6 (38.5) | 9.1 (48.4) | 12.8 (55.0) | 15.6 (60.1) | 13.9 (57.0) | 9.7 (49.5) | 3.8 (38.8) | −0.9 (30.4) | −5.3 (22.5) | 4.0 (39.2) |
| Mean daily minimum °C (°F) | −10.7 (12.7) | −10.0 (14.0) | −7.4 (18.7) | −2.2 (28.0) | 2.8 (37.0) | 6.6 (43.9) | 9.5 (49.1) | 8.3 (46.9) | 4.5 (40.1) | −0.3 (31.5) | −4.0 (24.8) | −9.0 (15.8) | −1.0 (30.2) |
| Mean minimum °C (°F) | −25.3 (−13.5) | −24.1 (−11.4) | −20.2 (−4.4) | −9.8 (14.4) | −4.4 (24.1) | 0.2 (32.4) | 3.3 (37.9) | 0.9 (33.6) | −3.6 (25.5) | −10.2 (13.6) | −15.8 (3.6) | −21.7 (−7.1) | −28.3 (−18.9) |
| Record low °C (°F) | −39.3 (−38.7) | −39.4 (−38.9) | −35.6 (−32.1) | −27.0 (−16.6) | −12.4 (9.7) | −5.4 (22.3) | −1.7 (28.9) | −3.2 (26.2) | −10.2 (13.6) | −21.7 (−7.1) | −34.0 (−29.2) | −38.0 (−36.4) | −39.4 (−38.9) |
| Average precipitation mm (inches) | 61.8 (2.43) | 39.1 (1.54) | 34.8 (1.37) | 38.0 (1.50) | 68.9 (2.71) | 78.5 (3.09) | 93.8 (3.69) | 101.3 (3.99) | 56.0 (2.20) | 65.3 (2.57) | 59.5 (2.34) | 51.5 (2.03) | 748.5 (29.46) |
Source 1: SMHI Open Data
Source 2: SMHI climate data 2002–2018

== Notable people ==
- Stina Nilsson (*1993), cross-country skier
- Niss Oskar Jonsson (*1909 +2002), businessman and founder of Jofa
- Sven Jerring (*1895 +1979), radio presenter, sports journalist and commentator

== See also ==
- Malung Sälen Party
- Svenska dansbandsveckan
