= Black Daisy =

Irish-Lithuanian band

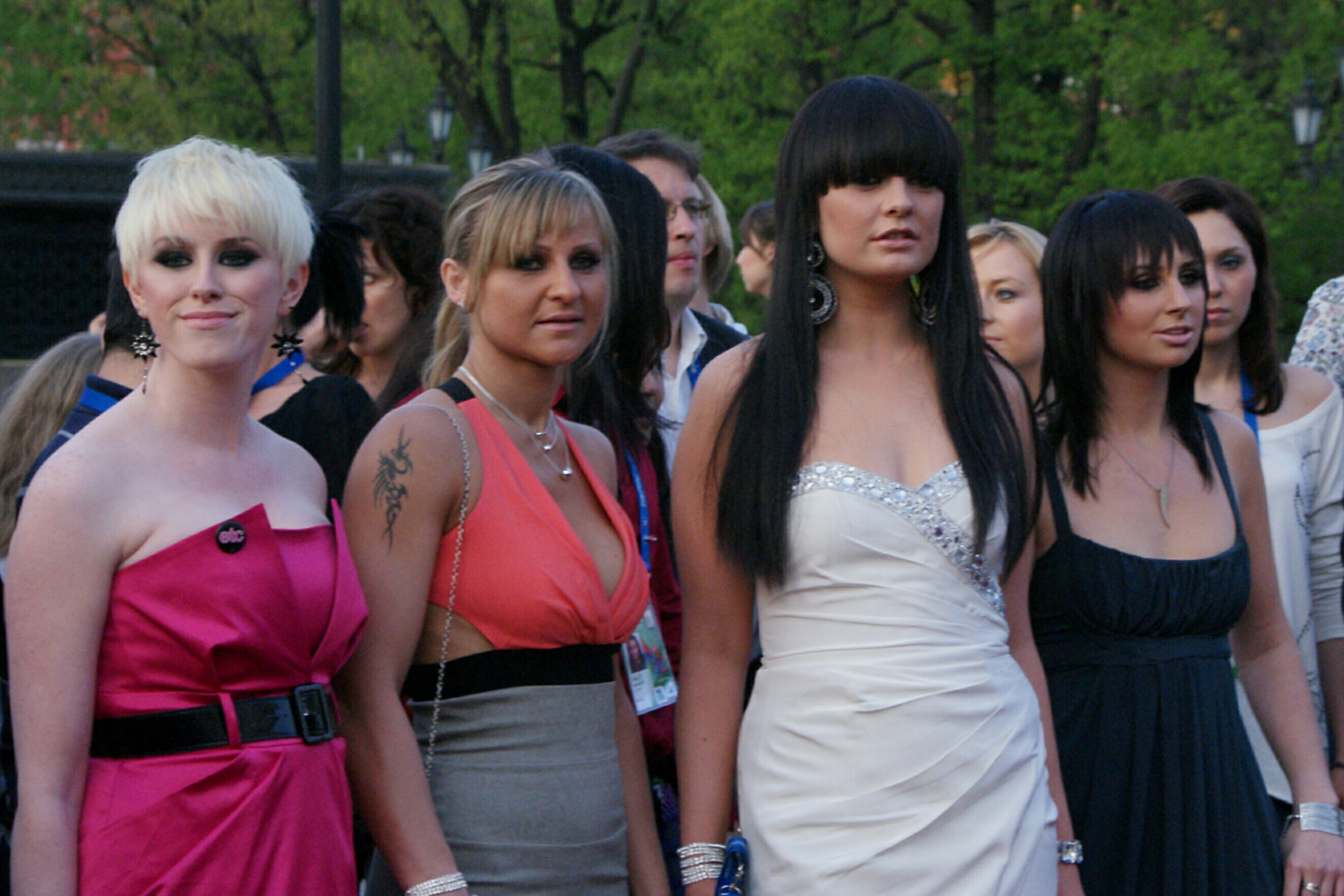
- Black Daisy with Sinéad Mulvey in Moscow (2009)

Background information
- Origin: Dublin, Ireland
- Genres: Alternative rock, pop-rock and powerpop
- Years active: 2008–2009
- Past members: Lesley-Ann Halvey; Asta Millerienė; Nicole Billings

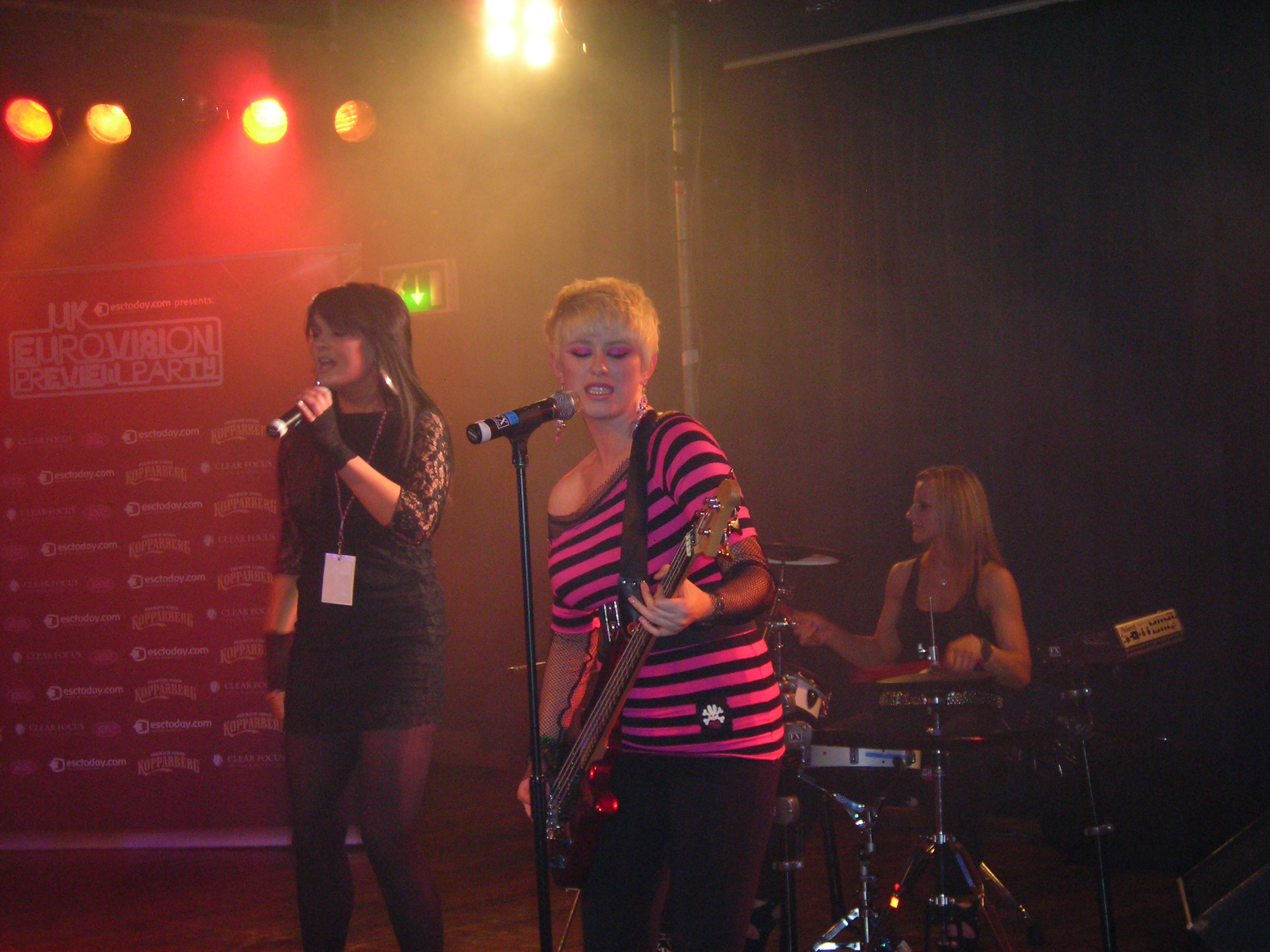
Black Daisy with Sinéad Mulvey performing "Et Cetera" at the Scala in London on 17 April 2009.

Black Daisy was an Irish-Lithuanian band that, along with Sinéad Mulvey represented Ireland at the Eurovision Song Contest 2009 with the song Et Cetera.

== Biography ==
The band originated from Dublin, and was formed by Steff Caffrey (lead guitar and backing vocals), Nicole Billings (rhythm guitar and backing vocals), Asta Millerienė (drums), and Lesley-Ann Halvey (lead vocals and bass guitar). Steff Caffrey was asked to leave the band in February 2009 as RTÉ, the Irish national Broadcaster, felt that a 4-piece backing band was too large for the Eurovision stage. The band also appeared on the MTV series Breaking Point and competed in the final series of You're a Star.

=== Eurovision 2009 ===
On the 20 February 2009, the band, performing with Irish singer Sinéad Mulvey, won the Irish pre-selection for the Eurovision Song Contest 2009 in Moscow, Russia. They competed in the second semi-final on 14 May 2009, failing to reach the final.

== Videos ==
Date	Name	Link
February 2008	Disturbing New Fashion	
March 2009	Et Cetera	

Awards and achievements
Preceded by Dustin the Turkey with "Irelande Douze Pointe"	Ireland in the Eurovision Song Contest (with Sinéad Mulvey); 2009	Succeeded by Niamh Kavanagh with "It's for You"
