= Ireland in the Eurovision Song Contest 2009 =

- Eurovision Song Contest 2009
- Participating broadcaster: Radio Telefís Éireann (RTÉ)
- Country: Ireland
- Selection process: Eurosong 2009
- Selection date: 20 February 2009

Competing entry
- Song: "Et Cetera"
- Artist: Sinéad Mulvey and Black Daisy
- Songwriters: Niall Mooney; Jonas Gladnikoff; Daniele Moretti; Christina Schilling

Placement
- Semi-final result: Failed to qualify (11th)

Participation chronology

Ireland was represented at the Eurovision Song Contest 2009 with the song "Et Cetera", written by Niall Mooney, Jonas Gladnikoff, Daniele Moretti, and Christina Schilling, and performed by Sinéad Mulvey and the band Black Daisy. The Irish participating broadcaster, Radio Telefís Éireann (RTÉ), organised the national final Eurosong 2009 in order to select its entry for the contest. Six songs faced the votes of four regional juries and a public televote, ultimately resulting in the selection of "Et Cetera" performed by Sinéad Mulvey and Black Daisy as the Irish Eurovision entry.

Ireland was drawn to compete in the second semi-final of the Eurovision Song Contest which took place on 14 May 2009. Performing during the show in position 2, "Et Cetera" was not announced among the top 10 entries of the second semi-final and therefore did not qualify to compete in the final. It was later revealed that Ireland placed eleventh out of the 19 participating countries in the semi-final with 52 points.

== Background ==
Prior to the 2009 contest, Radio Éireann (RÉ) until 1966, and Radio Telefís Éireann (RTÉ) since 1967, had participated in the Eurovision Song Contest representing Ireland forty-two times since RÉ's first entry in 1965. They have won the contest a record seven times in total. Their first win came in 1970, with "All Kinds of Everything" performed by Dana. Ireland holds the record for being the only country to win the contest three times in a row (in 1992, 1993, and 1994), as well as having the only three-time winner (Johnny Logan, who won in 1980 as a singer, 1987 as a singer-songwriter, and again in 1992 as a songwriter). The Irish entry in 2008, "Irelande Douze Pointe" performed by Dustin the Turkey, failed to qualify to the final.

As part of its duties as participating broadcaster, RTÉ organises the selection of its entry in the Eurovision Song Contest and broadcasts the event in the country. The broadcaster confirmed its intentions to participate at the 2009 contest on 28 October 2008. In 2008, RTÉ had set up the national final Eurosong to choose both the song and performer to compete at Eurovision for Ireland, with both the public and regional jury groups involved in the selection. For the 2009 contest, RTÉ announced on 18 December 2008 the organisation of Eurosong 2009 to choose the artist and song, following speculation that it was in talks with former contest winner Johnny Logan due to the economic downturn in the country that made the organisation of a planned national final impossible.

== Before Eurovision ==
=== Eurosong 2009 ===
Eurosong 2009 was the national final format developed by RTÉ in order to select its entry for the Eurovision Song Contest 2009. The competition was held on 20 February 2009 at the Studio 4 of RTÉ in Dublin, hosted by Pat Kenny and broadcast on RTÉ One as well as online via the broadcaster's official website rte.ie during a special edition of The Late Late Show.

==== Competing entries ====
On 18 December 2008, RTÉ opened a submission period where artists and composers were able to submit their entries for the competition until 2 February 2009. Artists were also required to include their suggestions for the proposed performance or staging details of their songs. At the closing of the deadline, 300 entries were received. Six finalists were selected by a five-member jury panel appointed by RTÉ: singer and former contest winner Linda Martin, Universal Music Ireland director Mark Crossingham, agent and choreographer Julian Benson, broadcaster Larry Gogan and chairman of OGAE Ireland Diarmuid Furlong. All of the submissions were evaluated based on criteria consisting of the suitability of the song for Eurovision as well as quality, experience and stage appeal of the artist. The finalists were announced on 13 February 2009, while their songs were presented on 21 February 2009 during The Derek Mooney Show on RTÉ Radio 1.

Artist	Song	Songwriter(s)
Johnny Brady	"Amazing"	Tony Adams Rosa
Kristīna Zaharova	"I Wish I Could Pretend"	Lauris Reiniks, Gordon Pogoda
Laura-Jayne Hunter	"Out of Control"	Derry O'Donovan
Lee Bradshaw	"So What"	Billy Larkin, Kevin Breathnach
M.N.A.	"Flying"	Ronan McCormack
Sinéad Mulvey and Black Daisy	"Et Cetera"	Niall Mooney, Jonas Gladnikoff, Daniele Moretti, Christina Schilling

==== Final ====
The national final took place on 20 February 2009 and featured guest performances from former contest winners Paul Harrington and Charlie McGettigan as well as commentary from a panel that consisted of commentator Marty Whelan, singer and former contest winner Linda Martin and talk show host Jerry Springer. Following the 50/50 combination of votes from four regional juries and public televoting, "Et Cetera" performed by Sinéad Mulvey and Black Daisy was selected as the winner.

Final – 20 February 2009
R/O	Artist	Song	Jury	Televote	Total	Place
1	M.N.A.	"Flying"	15	8	23	6
2	Laura-Jayne Hunter	"Out of Control"	9	32	41	3
3	Lee Bradshaw	"So What"	10	16	26	4
4	Johnny Brady	"Amazing"	20	4	24	5
5	Kristīna Zaharova	"I Wish I Could Pretend"	32	24	56	2
6	Sinéad Mulvey and Black Daisy	"Et Cetera"	38	40	78	1

Detailed Regional Jury Votes
R/O	Song	Cork	Sligo	Limerick	Dublin	Total
1	"Flying"	8	4	1	2	15
2	"Out of Control"	2	2	4	1	9
3	"So What"	1	1	2	6	10
4	"Amazing"	4	6	6	4	20
5	"I Wish I Could Pretend"	6	8	8	10	32
6	"Et Cetera"	10	10	10	8	38

=== Promotion ===
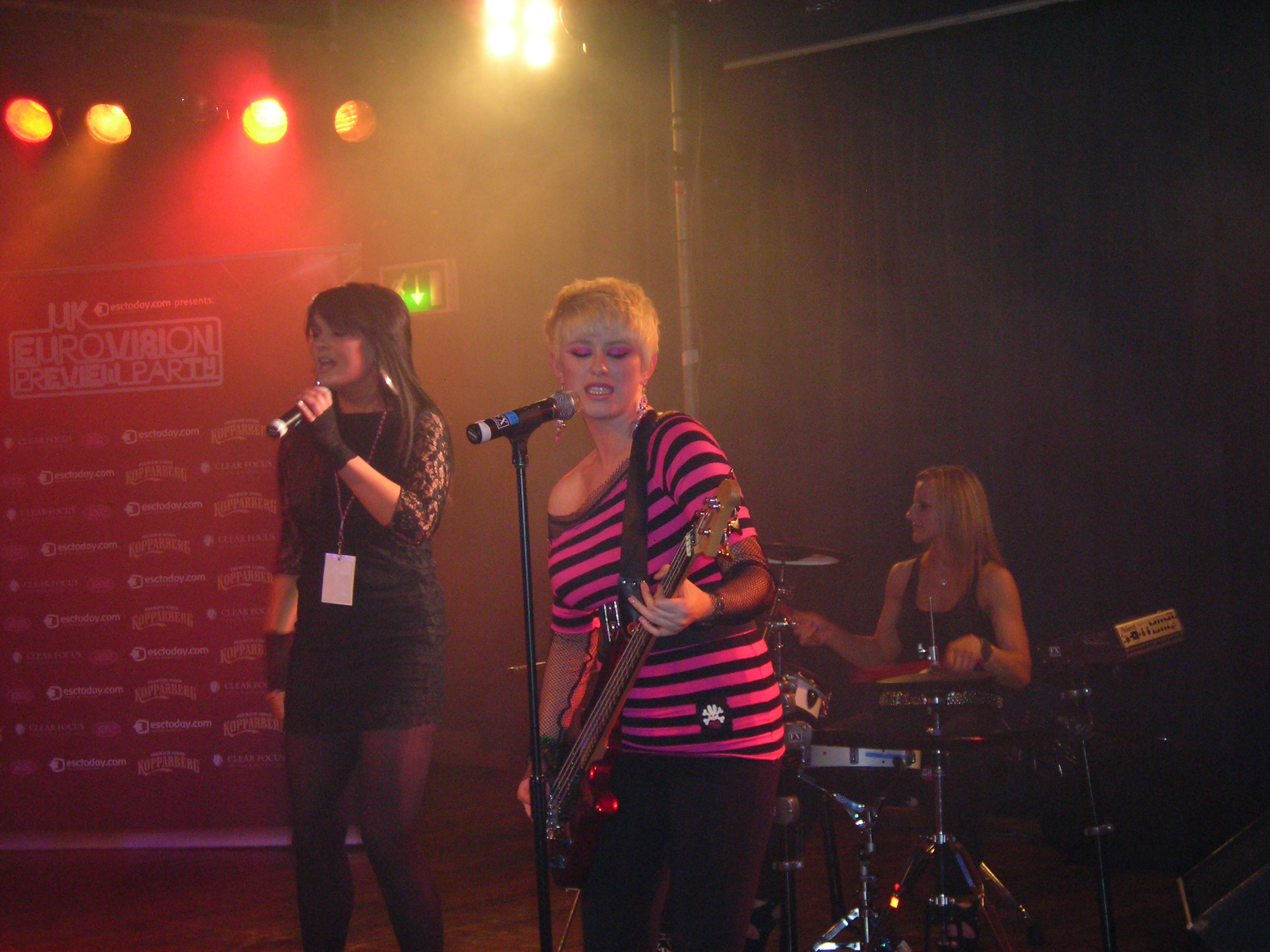
Sinéad Mulvey and Black Daisy performing during the UKEurovision Preview Party

Sinéad Mulvey and Black Daisy made several appearances across Europe to specifically promote "Et Cetera" as the Irish Eurovision entry. On 17 April, Mulvey and Black Daisy performed during the UKEurovision Preview Party, which was held at the La Scala venue in London, United Kingdom and hosted by Nicki French and Paddy O'Connell. On 18 April, Mulvey and Black Daisy performed during the Eurovision Promo Concert, which was held at the Café de Paris venue in Amsterdam, Netherlands and hosted by Marga Bult and Maggie MacNeal. In addition to their international appearances, Sinéad Mulvey and Black Daisy completed promotional appearances on RTÉ One programmes in Ireland, including a performance of "Et Cetera" during The Late Late Show on 1 May.

"Et Cetera" was released as a single by Sony Music on 1 May 2009 in Ireland, as both a physical CD single and as a digital download. It debuted on the Irish charts at #15 and peaked at #6.

== At Eurovision ==
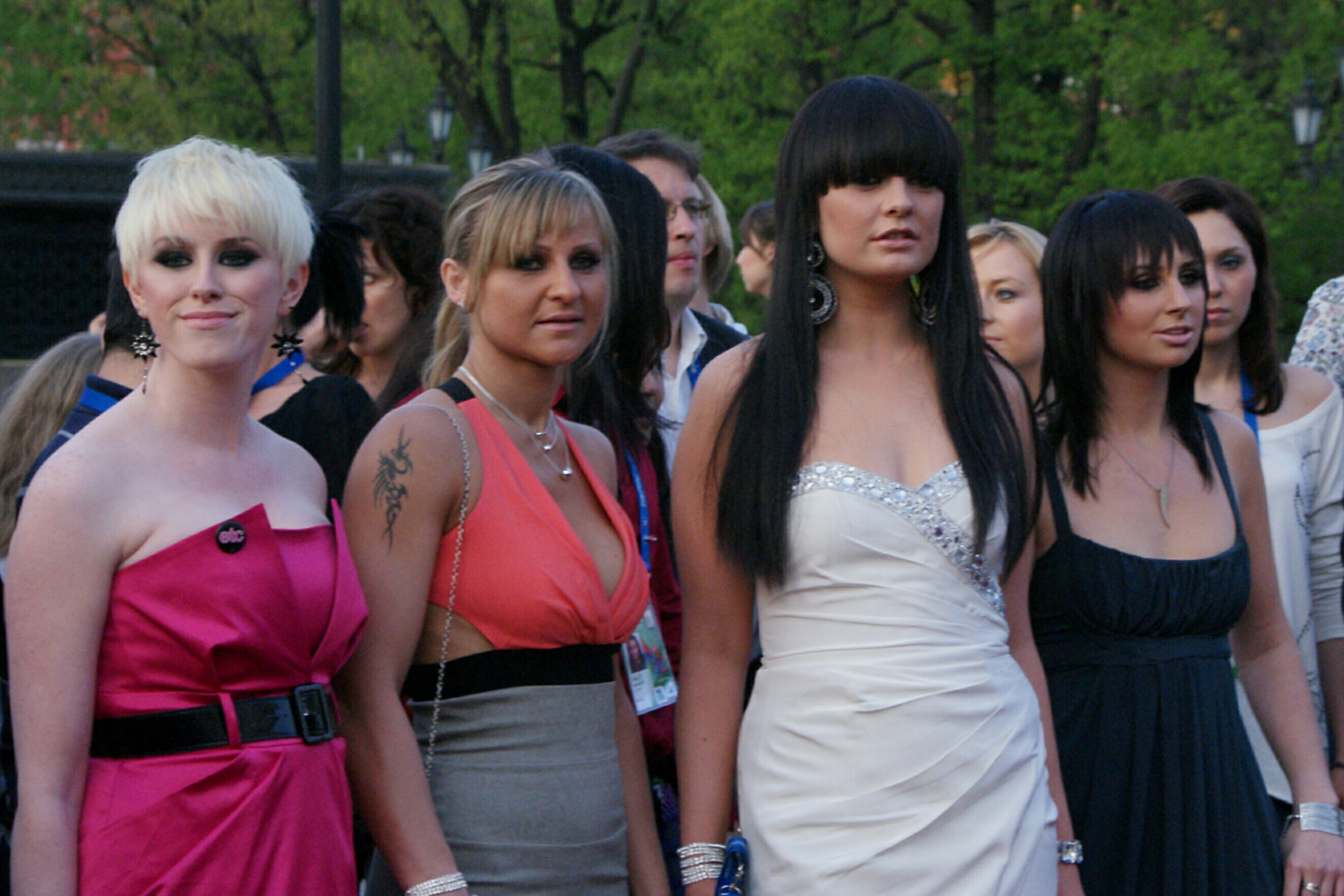
Sinéad Mulvey and Black Daisy at the Eurovision Opening Party in Moscow

According to Eurovision rules, all nations with the exceptions of the host country and the "Big Four" (France, Germany, Spain and the United Kingdom) are required to qualify from one of two semi-finals in order to compete for the final; the top nine songs from each semi-final as determined by televoting progress to the final, and a tenth was determined by back-up juries. The European Broadcasting Union (EBU) split up the competing countries into six different pots based on voting patterns from previous contests, with countries with favourable voting histories put into the same pot. On 30 January 2009, a special allocation draw was held which placed each country into one of the two semi-finals. Ireland was placed into the second semi-final, to be held on 14 May 2009. The running order for the semi-finals was decided through another draw on 16 March 2009 and Ireland was set to perform in position 2, following the entry from Croatia and before the entry from Latvia.

In Ireland, the semi-finals and the final were broadcast on RTÉ One with commentary by Marty Whelan. The second semi-final and final were also broadcast via radio on RTÉ Radio 1 with commentary by former contestant Maxi. The Irish spokesperson, who announced the Irish votes during the final, was Derek Mooney.

=== Semi-final ===
Sinéad Mulvey and Black Daisy took part in technical rehearsals on 5 and 8 May, followed by dress rehearsals on 13 and 14 May. The Irish performance featured a band set-up with Sinéad Mulvey and the members of Black Daisy dressed in black and pink. The LED screens displayed black and white moving letters and the words "Et Cetera" with the stage lighting situated directly at the back part of the stage which was accompanied by stroboscope-like effects. The performance also featured the use of a wind machine. Mulvey and the members of Black Daisy were joined on stage by a backing vocalist: Jenny Newman.

At the end of the show, Ireland was not announced among the top 10 entries in the second semi-final and therefore failed to qualify to compete in the final. It was later revealed that Ireland placed eleventh in the semi-final, receiving a total of 52 points.

=== Voting ===
The voting system for 2009 involved each country awarding points from 1–8, 10 and 12, with the points in the final being decided by a combination of 50% national jury and 50% televoting. Each nation's jury consisted of five music industry professionals who are citizens of the country they represent. This jury judged each entry based on: vocal capacity; the stage performance; the song's composition and originality; and the overall impression by the act. In addition, no member of a national jury was permitted to be related in any way to any of the competing acts in such a way that they cannot vote impartially and independently.

Below is a breakdown of points awarded to Ireland and awarded by Ireland in the second semi-final and grand final of the contest. The nation awarded its 12 points to Lithuania in the semi-final and to Iceland in the final of the contest.

==== Points awarded to Ireland ====
Points awarded to Ireland (Semi-final 2)
Score	Country
12 points	
10 points	Denmark
8 points	
7 points	Albania; Lithuania
6 points	
5 points	Latvia
4 points	Estonia; Norway
3 points	Netherlands; Poland; Serbia
2 points	Moldova; Slovenia
1 point	Croatia; France

==== Points awarded by Ireland ====
Points awarded by Ireland (Semi-final 2)
Score	Country
12 points	Lithuania
10 points	Poland
8 points	Norway
7 points	Denmark
6 points	Azerbaijan
5 points	Moldova
4 points	Estonia
3 points	Ukraine
2 points	Cyprus
1 point	Slovakia

Points awarded by Ireland (Final)
Score	Country
12 points	Iceland
10 points	United Kingdom
8 points	Norway
7 points	Lithuania
6 points	Estonia
5 points	Malta
4 points	Denmark
3 points	France
2 points	Romania
1 point	Germany

==== Detailed voting results ====
The following five members comprised the Irish jury:

- Linda Martin – singer, winner of the Eurovision Song Contest 1992, represented Ireland also in the 1984 Contest
- Paul Harrington – musician, winner of the Eurovision Song Contest 1994
- Bill Hughes – producer
- Emma O'Driscoll – singer, television personality
- Luan Parle – singer, songwriter

Detailed voting results from Ireland (Final)
R/O	Country	Results			Points
R/O	Country	Jury	Televoting	Combined	Points
01	Lithuania		12	12	7
02	Israel				
03	France	6		6	3
04	Sweden	4		4	
05	Croatia				
06	Portugal				
07	Iceland	12	7	19	12
08	Greece				
09	Armenia				
10	Russia	1		1	
11	Azerbaijan	2		2	
12	Bosnia and Herzegovina				
13	Moldova		3	3	
14	Malta	7	2	9	5
15	Estonia	5	5	10	6
16	Denmark		6	6	4
17	Germany	3	1	4	1
18	Turkey				
19	Albania				
20	Norway	10	8	18	8
21	Ukraine				
22	Romania		4	4	2
23	United Kingdom	8	10	18	10
24	Finland				
25	Spain				
