= Greece in the Eurovision Song Contest 2010 =

- Eurovision Song Contest 2010
- Participating broadcaster: Hellenic Broadcasting Corporation (ERT)
- Country: Greece
- Selection process: Ellinikós Telikós 2010
- Selection date: 12 March 2010

Competing entry
- Song: "Opa"
- Artist: Giorgos Alkaios and Friends
- Songwriters: Giorgos Alkaios; Giannis Antoniou; Friends

Placement
- Semi-final result: Qualified (2nd, 133 points)
- Final result: 8th, 140 points

Participation chronology

Greece was represented at the Eurovision Song Contest 2010 with the song "Opa", written by Giorgos Alkaios, Giannis Antoniou, and Friends Music Factory, and performed by Alkaios and Friends. The Greek participating broadcaster, the Hellenic Broadcasting Corporation (ERT), organised the national final Ellinikós Telikós 2010 to select its entry for the contest. The event, which took place on 12 March 2010, was initially to include 10 songs, however there was one withdrawal and two disqualifications prior to the night of the competition.

Financial constraints at ERT limited the amount of promotion for the year's entry, with Alkaios producing his own music video for the song and traveling to Turkey, Belgium and Portugal. Greece took part in the first semi-final of the contest on 25 May 2010 and qualified for the final, placing second with 133 points. At the 29 May final, Alkaios and Friends performed "Opa" 11th out of the 25 participants and at the end of voting, was awarded eighth place, marking Greece's seventh consecutive top 10 placing since 2004.

== Background ==
Prior to the 2010 contest, Greece had participated in the Eurovision Song Contest 30 times since their first entry in 1974. To this point, they won the contest once, in 2005 with the song "My Number One" performed by Helena Paparizou, and placed third three times: in 2001 with the song "Die for You" performed by the duo Antique; in 2004 with "Shake It" performed by Sakis Rouvas; and in 2008 with "Secret Combination" performed by Kalomira. Following the introduction of semi-finals for the 2004 contest, Greece qualified for the final each year. Their least successful result was in 1998 when they placed 20th with the song "Mia krifi evaisthisia" by Thalassa, receiving only 12 points in total, all from Cyprus.

As part of its duties as participating broadcaster, the Hellenic Broadcasting Corporation (ERT) organises the selection of its entry in the Eurovision Song Contest and broadcasts the event in the country. Although its selection techniques have varied over the decades, the most common has been a national final in which various acts compete against each other with pre-selected songs, voted on by a jury, televoters, or both. In most cases, internal selections have been reserved for high-profile acts, with the song either being selected internally or with multiple songs —by one or multiple composers— performed by the artist during a televised final. A departure from this method was a reality television talent competition format inspired by the Idol series that ran for many months in 2004, ultimately being scrapped.

== Before Eurovision ==
=== Ellinikós Telikós 2010 ===
Ellinikós Telikós 2010 was the Greek national final organised by ERT to select the Greek entry for the Eurovision Song Contest 2010. The competition took place on 12 March 2010 at the Alpha TV Studio in Athens, hosted by Rika Vaggiani and Jenny Balatsinou and artistically headed by Fokas Evangelinos. The show was televised on NET, ERT World, in Cyprus via the channel RIK 1 as well as online via the ERT website ert.gr and the official Eurovision Song Contest website eurovision.tv.

==== Competing entries ====
After requesting proposals from record labels, ten artists, mostly newcomers to the Greek music scene, were selected by ERT to participate in the national final. The ten acts were announced on 18 December 2009. On 12 January 2010, the candidate pool was reduced by one as Despina Ricci announced her withdrawal from consideration due to prior commitments. Two disqualifications took place in the subsequent weeks as both Katerine Avgoustakis's song "Enjoy the Day" and Eleftheria Eleftheriou's song "Tables Are Turning" were found to have been made available prior to the official ERT presentation date, which was scheduled for 5 March 2010. Avgoustakis's song was found to have been available on YouTube since 5 November 2009, while Eleftheria Eleftheriou's song was leaked to the internet on 25 February 2010. In response to concerns about potential further leaks of the remaining seven competing entries, ERT decided to make them available on its website early, on 26 February 2010. Their accompanying music videos were presented on 5 March 2010 during a special program hosted by Dimitra Agkriotou and Despina Fagkra, which was televised on NET and ERT World. Of the featured songwriters, Nektarios Tyrakis, writer of Émigré's entry "Touch Me Deep Inside" had previously written two songs that went on to participate in the Eurovision Song Contest: Sakis Rouvas's "Shake It" for Greece in 2004 and Angelica Agurbash's "Love Me Tonight" for Belarus in 2005.

Key: Withdrew/disqualified

Competing entries
Artist	Song	Songwriter(s)	Label
Christos Hatzinasios	"Illusion"	Christos Hatzinasios, Panos Nikolakopoulos, Gale Petrou	Symphony Records
Despina Ricci	N/A	N/A	Minos EMI
Eleftheria Eleftheriou	"Tables Are Turning"	Leonidas Chantzaras, Patric Sarin, Ali Tennant	Sony Music Greece
Émigré	"Touch Me Deep Inside"	Yannis Chaniotakis, Nektarios Tyrakis	Universal Music Greece
Giorgos Alkaios and Friends	"Opa" (Ώπα)	Giorgos Alkaios, Giannis Antoniou, Friends	Friends Music Factory
Giorgos Karadimos	"Polemao" (Πολεμάω)	Giorgos Karadimos, Vasilis Gavriilides	Universal Music Greece
Katerine Avgoustakis	"Enjoy the Day"	Katerine Avgoustakis, Yves Gaillard	Minos EMI
Manos Pyrovolakis feat. Eleni Foureira and Don't Ask	"Kivotos tou Noe" (Κιβωτός του Νώε)	Manos Pyrovolakis, Yannis Stigka	Universal Music Greece
Melisses	"Kinezos" (Κινέζος)	Melisses	Universal Music Greece
Sunny Baltzi and Second Skin	"Game of Life"	Sunny Baltzi	Minos EMI

==== Final ====
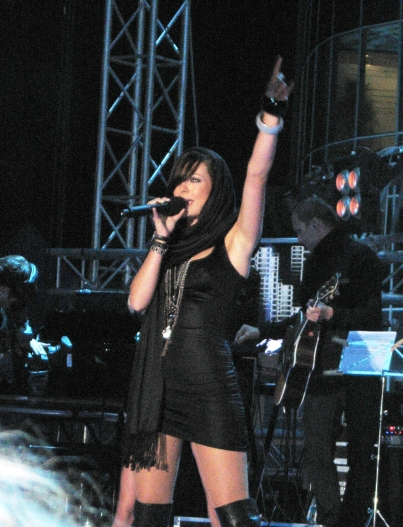
Disqualified participant Katerine Avgoustakis (pictured in 2009) appeared as a special guest in the show.

Seven songs competed in the national final, held on 12 March. The winner, "Opa" performed by Giorgos Alkaios and Friends, was selected by a 50/50 combination of public voting and jury voting. The jury consisted of Mimis Plessas (composer and conductor), Antonis Andrikakis (lyricist and General Manager of ERT Radio), Andreas Pylarinos (conductor), Christiana Stamatelou (journalist) and Poseidonas Yiannopoulos (producer and songwriter). Public voting was conducted through telephone or SMS. As there was a tie for the first place, the results of the public vote took precedence and led to the victory of Giorgos Alkaios and Friends.

In addition to the performances of the competing entries, the event included featured guest performances by 2010 Bulgarian Eurovision entrant Miroslav Kostadinov and 2010 Cypriot Eurovision entrants Jon Lilygreen and the Islanders. The previous year's presentation of Sakis Rouvas's "This Is Our Night" was shown as well as a prerecorded message from the artist. Disqualified entrant Katerine Avgoustakis was also present at the show, performing a piano ballad version of "Treat Me Like Lady" and "Enjoy the Day". The selection process broke ERT's previous viewership record, with a 75% increase in viewers compared to the year prior's final.

Results of Ellinikos Telikos 2010 – 12 March 2010
R/O	Artist	Song	Jury	Televote	Total	Place
1	Christos Hatzinasios	"Illusion"	—	—	—	—
2	Sunny Baltzi and Second Skin	"Game of Life"	—	—	—	—
3	Manos Pyrovolakis feat. Eleni Foureira and Don't Ask	"Kivotos tou Noe"	10	10	20	2
4	Giorgos Alkaios and Friends	"Opa"	8	12	20	1
5	Giorgos Karadimos	"Polemao"	12	8	20	3
6	Melisses	"Kinezos"	—	—	—	—
7	Émigré	"Touch Me Deep Inside"	—	—	—	—

=== Promotion ===
Due to financial constraints facing ERT, the winning entry had a limited budget compared to past years. ERT had planned to use the national final performance as the official music video, however, Alkaios offered to produce his own music video for "Opa", which was filmed on the Greek island of Milos and released on 13 April 2010. Alkaios also embarked on a promotional tour for the entry, first visiting Turkey where he met with Ecumenical Patriarch Bartholomew I of Constantinople in Istanbul followed by appearances on local television shows. He then traveled to Belgium between 29 April and 1 May, meeting with the Greek community of Brussels, appearing at a press conference at the Ramada Hotel in Antwerp on 30 April and performing in Limburg. Also while in Belgium, Alkaios joined fellow entrants from Armenia, Belgium, Ireland, Malta and Serbia at a Eurovision party where he performed his song. This was followed by additional promotional activities in Portugal.

== At Eurovision ==
The Eurovision Song Contest 2010 took place at Telenor Arena in Oslo, Norway, and consisted of two semi-finals held on 25 and 27 May, respectively, and the final on 29 May 2010. According to the contest's rules, all participating countries, except the host nation and the "Big Four", consisting of France, Germany, Spain and the United Kingdom, were required to qualify from one of the two semi-finals to compete for the final; the top 10 countries from the respective semi-finals progress to the final. The European Broadcasting Union (EBU) split up the competing countries into five different pots based on voting patterns from previous contests evaluated by Digame, in order to decrease the influence of neighbour and diaspora voting. An allocation draw was then held in Oslo on 7 February 2010, that placed each country into one of the two semi-finals and determined which half of the show they would perform in. Greece was placed into the first semi-final to be held on 25 May and was scheduled to perform in the second half of the show. Once all the competing songs for the 2010 contest had been released, the running order for the semi-finals was revealed, with Greece set to perform 13th, following Albania and preceding Portugal.

=== Performances ===
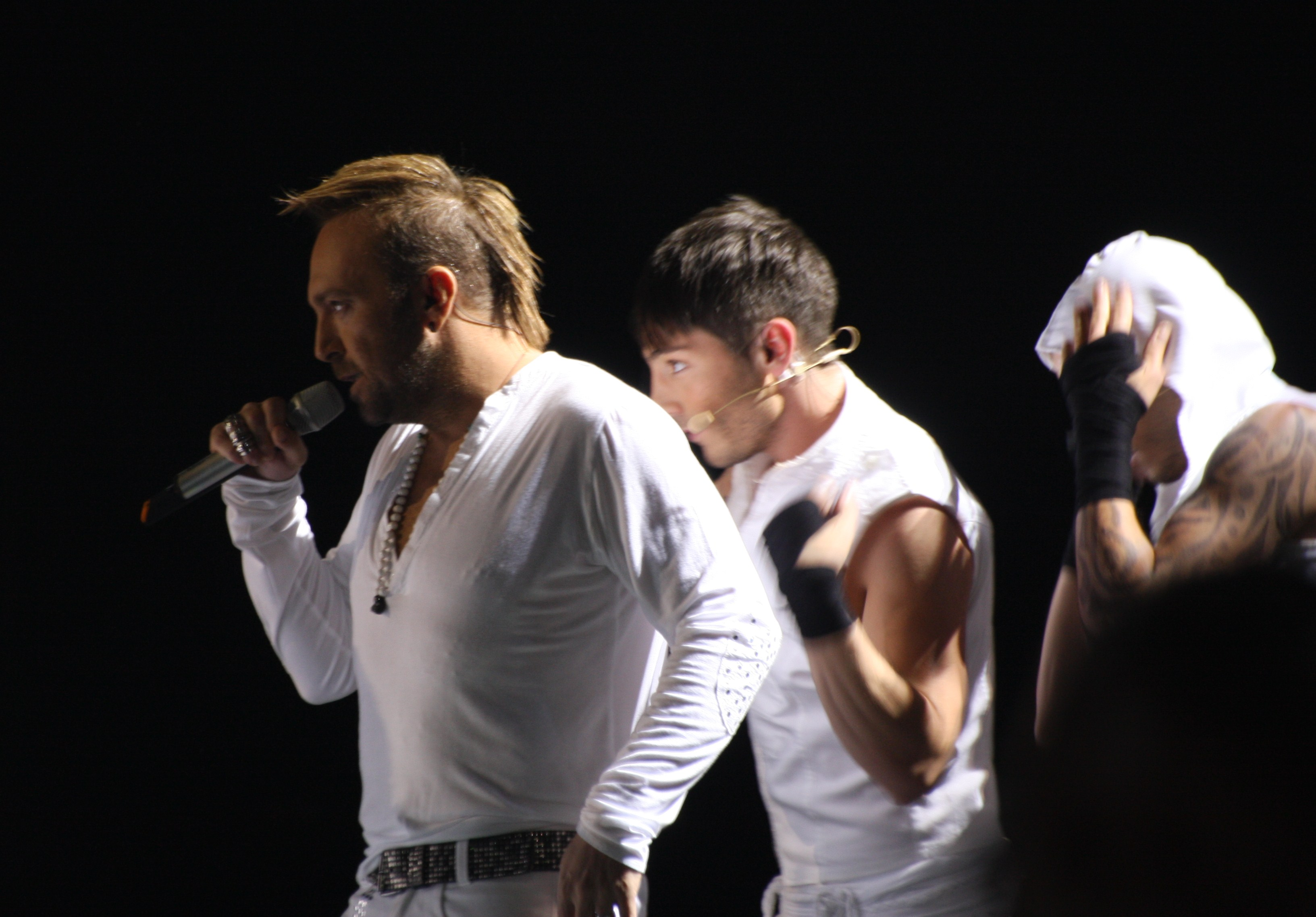
Alkaios and Friends performing at the Eurovision Song Contest 2010 final on 29 May.

For Alkaios's performance in Oslo, his stage presence differed from that of the national final, with Emi Zarian in serving as stage director and Pantelis Mitsou tasked with styling and costumes. The song itself was also modified, with a new introduction and a Pontic lyra bridge to open the stage presentation. The language of the song remained Greek, being the first entry to be sung completely in the native language since the rule requiring that was eliminated in 1999.

At the semi-final, the public awarded Greece first place with 151 points and the jury awarded third place with 99 points. This translated to an overall semi-final placing of second with 133 points, thus qualifying the nation to the final. In the final held four days later, Greece performed 11th, following Ireland and preceding United Kingdom. At the end of the voting phase, "Opa" came 8th with 140 points, with the public awarding Greece 7th place with 152 points and the jury awarding 11th place with 110 points.

=== Voting ===
Voting during the three shows involved each country awarding points from 1–8, 10 and 12 as determined by a combination of 50% national jury and 50% televoting. Each nation's jury consisted of five music industry professionals who are citizens of the country they represent. This jury judged each entry based on: vocal capacity; the stage performance; the song's composition and originality; and the overall impression by the act. In addition, no member of a national jury was permitted to be related in any way to any of the competing acts in such a way that they cannot vote impartially and independently. In the semi-final, Greece did not receive any top 12 points, however, it did receive the top 12 from Albania, Belgium, Cyprus and the United Kingdom in the final. Greece awarded its 12 points to Albania in the semi-final and to Cyprus in the final. The tables below visualise a complete breakdown of points awarded to Greece in both the first semi-final and the final of the Eurovision Song Contest 2010, as well as by the country on both occasions.

==== Points awarded to Greece ====
Points awarded to Greece (Semi-final 1)
Score	Country
12 points	
10 points	Albania; Belgium; Portugal; Spain; Serbia
8 points	Bosnia and Herzegovina; Finland; Germany; Iceland; Malta; Slovakia
7 points	Moldova; Poland; Russia
6 points	
5 points	Belarus
4 points	France
3 points	Macedonia
2 points	Estonia
1 point	

Points awarded to Greece (Final)
Score	Country
12 points	Albania; Belgium; Cyprus; United Kingdom
10 points	Serbia
8 points	Germany; Iceland; Portugal
7 points	Finland; Malta; Romania
6 points	Bosnia and Herzegovina
5 points	Bulgaria; Slovakia; Spain
4 points	France
3 points	Armenia; Netherlands; Turkey
2 points	Moldova
1 point	Poland

==== Points awarded by Greece ====
Points awarded by Greece (Semi-final 1)
Score	Country
12 points	Albania
10 points	Belgium
8 points	Iceland
7 points	Serbia
6 points	Belarus
5 points	Bosnia and Herzegovina
4 points	Moldova
3 points	Russia
2 points	Malta
1 point	Estonia

Points awarded by Greece (Final)
Score	Country
12 points	Cyprus
10 points	Albania
8 points	France
7 points	Armenia
6 points	Belgium
5 points	Georgia
4 points	Romania
3 points	Iceland
2 points	Germany
1 point	Azerbaijan
