= Azerbaijan in the Eurovision Song Contest 2010 =

- Eurovision Song Contest 2010
- Participating broadcaster: İctimai Televiziya (İTV)
- Country: Azerbaijan
- Selection process: Artist: Land of Fire 2010; Song: Internal selection
- Selection date: Artist: 2 March 2010; Song: 18 March 2010

Competing entry
- Song: "Drip Drop"
- Artist: Safura
- Songwriters: Anders Bagge; Stefan Örn; Sandra Bjurman

Placement
- Semi-final result: Qualified (2nd, 113 points)
- Final result: 5th, 145 points

Participation chronology

Azerbaijan was represented at the Eurovision Song Contest 2010 with the song "Drip Drop", written by Anders Bagge, Stefan Örn, and Sandra Bjurman, and performed by Safura. The Azerbaijani participating broadcaster, İctimai Televiziya (İTV), selected its representative through Land of Fire 2010. Following a semi-final and a final on 2 February and 2 March 2010, respectively, a seven-member jury selected Safura as the winner. The song "Drip Drop" was internally selected and presented to the public on 18 March.

Azerbaijan was drawn to compete in the second semi-final of the Eurovision Song Contest which took place on 27 May 2010. Performing during the show in position 7, "Drip Drop" was announced among the top 10 entries of the second semi-final and therefore qualified to compete in the final on 29 May. It was later revealed that Azerbaijan placed second out of the 17 participating countries in the semi-final with 113 points. In the final, Azerbaijan performed in position 1 and placed fifth out of the 25 participating countries, scoring 145 points.

== Background ==
Prior to the 2010 contest, İctimai Televiziya (İTV) had participated in the Eurovision Song Contest representing Azerbaijan twice since its first entry in 2008. In 2008 and 2009, it qualified to the final on both occasions and placed in the top ten, including a third-place result in 2009 with the song "Always" performed by AySel and Arash.

As part of its duties as participating broadcaster, İTV organises the selection of its entry in the Eurovision Song Contest and broadcasts the event in the country. The broadcaster confirmed its intentions to participate at the 2010 contest on 1 June 2009. In 2008, İTV organized a national final titled Land of Fire, which resulted in the selection of a winning performer that would subsequently be given an internally selected song to perform at Eurovision, while in 2009, the broadcaster internally selected both the artist and song. For its 2010 entry, İTV opted to organise the Land of Fire national final.

== Before Eurovision ==
=== Land of Fire 2010 ===
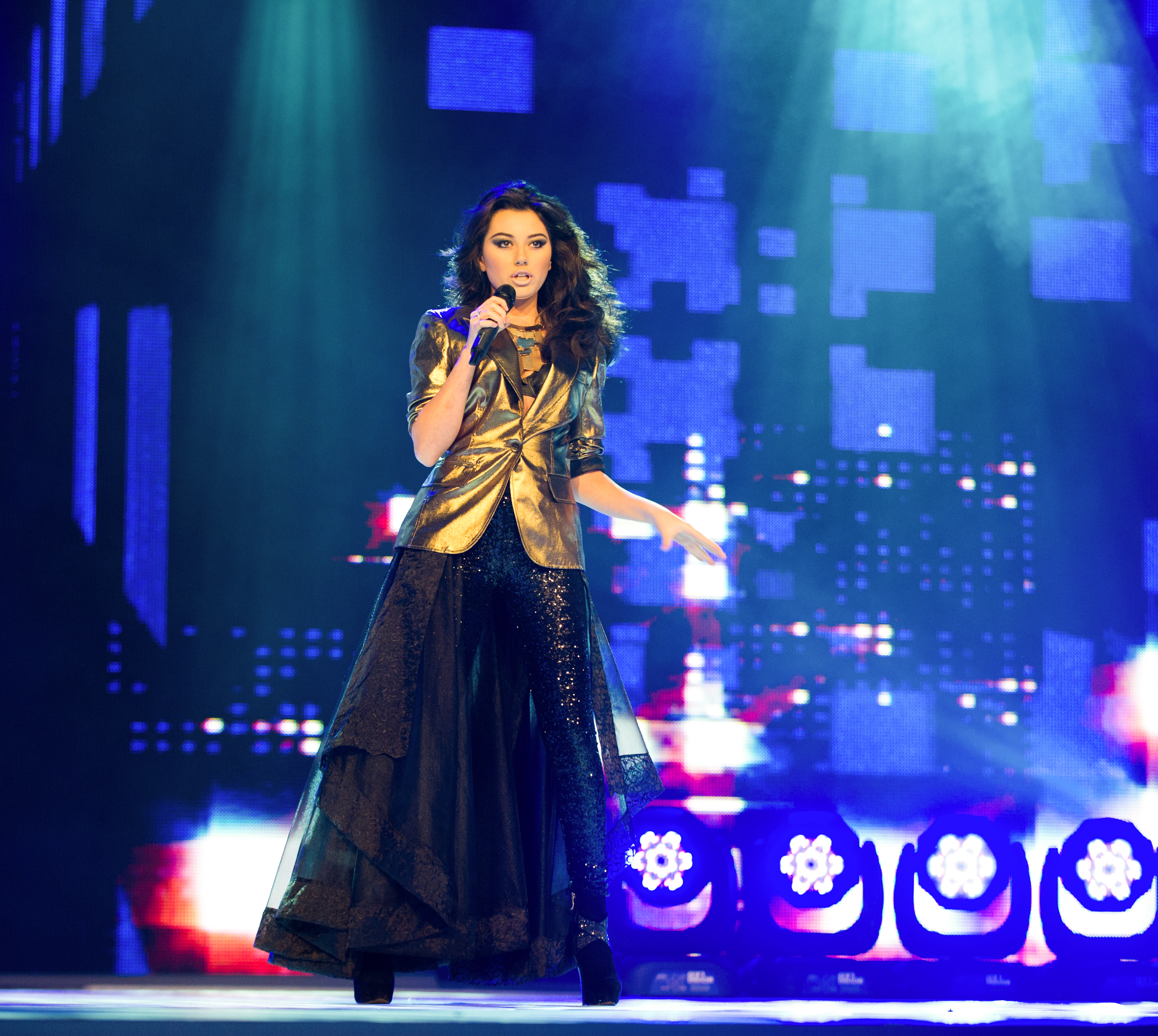
Safura was selected to represent Azerbaijan in the Eurovision Song Contest 2010 following her victory at Land of Fire 2010

Land of Fire 2010 was the national final organised by İTV that selected the Azerbaijani contestant for the Eurovision Song Contest 2010. The competition consisted of two shows concluded with a winning artist on 2 March 2010. The two shows took place at the Buta Palace in Baku and hosted by Husniyya Maharramova and Ilham Gasimov. Both shows were broadcast on İTV and streamed online via the broadcaster's website itv.az. The competition was also broadcast in Turkey on TRT Avaz and in Georgia on GPB.

==== Format ====
The national final consisted of two stages. The first stage involved an audition period where interested artists had the opportunity to apply for the competition. Six artists were selected and advanced to the second stage, the televised shows. Two introductory shows were broadcast on 15 and 23 January 2010 where the six artists were presented. Two shows including a semi-final on 2 February 2010 selected the artists (who each performed an original song) that would advance to the final on 2 March 2010. In the final, the winner was selected from the remaining artists who each performed three candidate Eurovision songs. The results of both shows were determined by the votes of a seven-member jury panel.

The members of the jury were:

- Ismail Omarov – General Director of İTV
- Farhad Badalbeyli – Rector of the Baku Academy of Music
- Murad Adigozelzade – Director of the Azerbaijan State Academic Philharmonic Hall
- Lala Kazimova – President of the National Music Committee of Azerbaijan
- Azad Aliyev – conductor
- Manzar Nuraliyeva – representative of the Ministry of Culture and Tourism of Azerbaijan
- Farhad Hajiyev – representative of the Ministry of Youth and Sports of Azerbaijan

==== Competing entries ====
On 1 June 2009, İTV called for interested artists to submit their applications to the broadcaster by 30 September 2009. Eligible artists were those that were citizens of Azerbaijan or part of the Azerbaijani diaspora. Artists were required to submit cover versions of two songs along with their application: one ballad and one uptempo song. On 6 January 2010, the six artists selected for the competition from over 30 applications based on the decision of İTV and a group of local and international experts based on criteria such as vocal, dance and foreign language abilities were announced. On 3 February 2010, the broadcaster called for interested songwriters to submit their entries by 20 February 2010. Songwriters could be of any nationality. Five candidate Eurovision songs were selected from submissions from local and international songwriters and announced on 2 March 2010. One of the songs, "Don't Let the Morning Come", was later withdrawn and therefore was not performed during the final.

Competing songs
Song	Songwriter(s)
"Cancelled"	Stefan Örn, Negin, Random
"Drip Drop"	Anders Bagge, Stefan Örn, Sandra Bjurman
"Soulless"	Anders Lundström
"Under My Skin"	Stefan Örn, Phil Anquetil

==== Semi-final ====
The semi-final took place on 2 February 2010 where the six artists each performed an original song. The jury selected three of the artists to advance to the final. In addition to the performances of the artists, Ukrainian Eurovision Song Contest 2004 winner Ruslana, Norwegian Eurovision Song Contest 2009 winner Alexander Rybak and 2009 Azerbaijani Eurovision entrant AySel and Arash performed during the show as guests.

Semi-final – 2 February 2010
R/O	Artist	Song	Songwriter(s)	Result
1	Milk and Kisses	"I Am on Fire"	Dilara Kazimova, Farida Nelson, DJ LOOPer	Qualified
2	Elli Mishiyeva	"Up, Up"	Isa Melikov, Paulina Malikova, Elli Mishiyeva	—N/a
3	Azad Shabanov	"Smile"	Zahra Badalbeyli, Vusal Garayev	—N/a
4	Ulviyya Rahimova	"In Love"	Ulviyya Rahimova, Sergey Guliyev, Lala Guliyeva	—N/a
5	Safura Alizadeh	"Söz Ver"	Elvin Musayev, Gunel Musayeva, Zahra Badalbeyli	Qualified
6	Maryam Shabanova	"I've Had Enough"	Maryam Shabanova	Qualified

==== Final ====
The final took place on 2 March 2010 where the remaining three artists each performed three of the four candidate Eurovision songs. Safura Alizadeh was selected by the jury as the winner. In addition to the performances of the artists, AySel and Arash, Belarusian singer Dakota and 2010 Georgian Eurovision entrant Sofia Nizharadze performed during the show as guests.

Final – 2 March 2010
R/O	Artist	Song
1	Safura Alizadeh	"Drip Drop"
2	Safura Alizadeh	"Under My Skin"
3	Safura Alizadeh	"Soulless"
4	Milk and Kisses	"Under My Skin"
5	Milk and Kisses	"Drip Drop"
6	Milk and Kisses	"Cancelled"
7	Maryam Shabanova	"Under My Skin"
8	Maryam Shabanova	"Soulless"
9	Maryam Shabanova	"Drip Drop"

=== Song selection ===
On 18 March 2010, İTV announced that Safura would be performing the song "Drip Drop" at the Eurovision Song Contest 2010. The selection of the song was based on the decision of İTV and the seven-member jury panel of Land of Fire 2010 from the three candidate Eurovision songs performed by Safura during the final of the competition.

=== Promotion ===
Safura made several appearances across Europe to specifically promote "Drip Drop" as the Azerbaijani Eurovision entry. On 5 March, Safura performed "Drip Drop" during the first Ukrainian Eurovision national final of 2010. Safura also took part in promotional activities in Belgium, Germany, Greece, Netherlands, Poland, Russia and Switzerland.

== At Eurovision ==
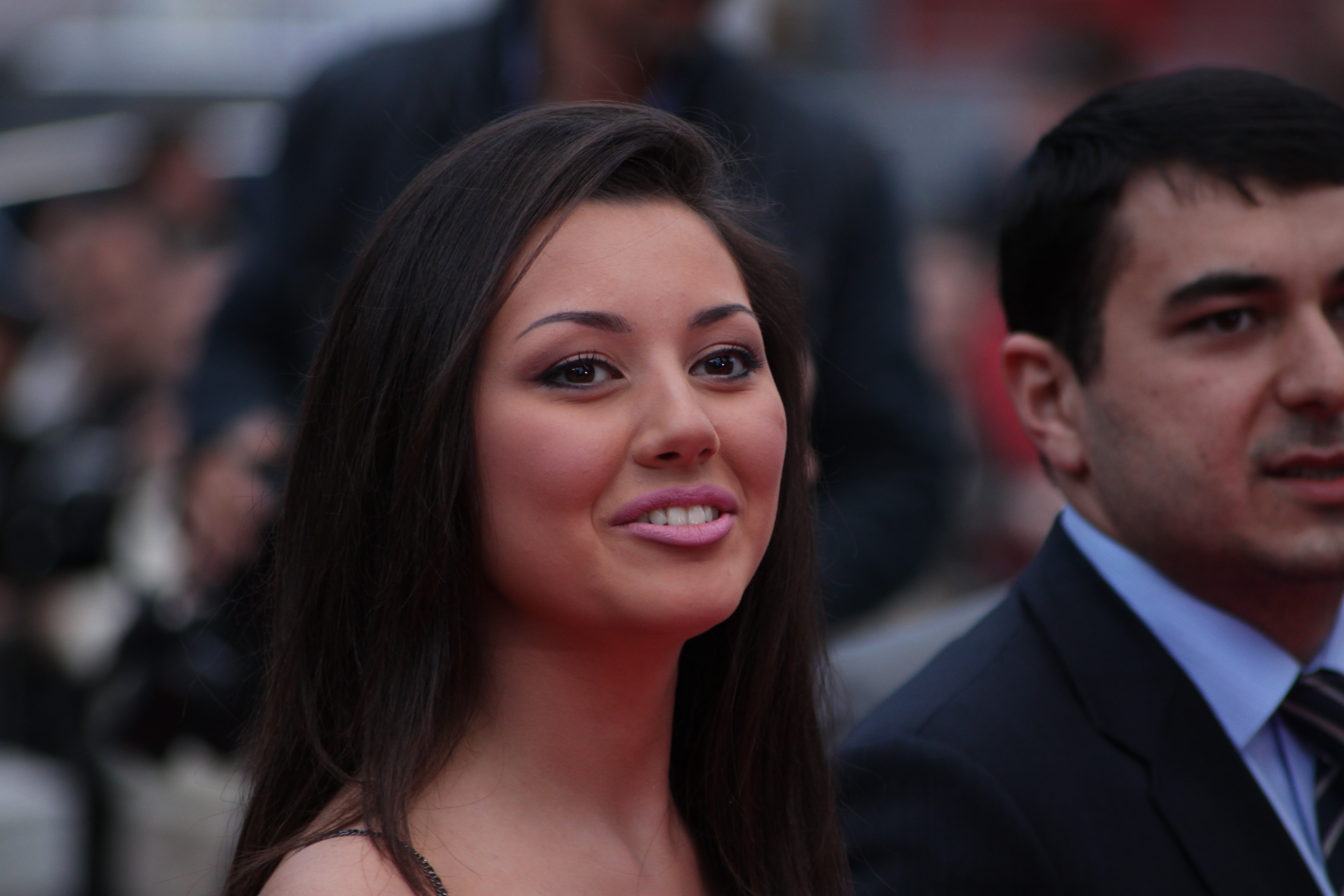
Safura at the Eurovision Opening Party in Oslo

According to Eurovision rules, all nations with the exceptions of the host country and the "Big Four" (France, Germany, Spain and the United Kingdom) were required to qualify from one of two semi-finals in order to compete for the final; the top ten countries from each semi-final progress to the final. The European Broadcasting Union (EBU) split up the competing countries into six different pots based on voting patterns from previous contests, with countries with favourable voting histories put into the same pot. On 7 February 2010, a special allocation draw was held which placed each country into one of the two semi-finals, as well as which half of the show they would perform in. Azerbaijan was placed into the second semi-final, to be held on 27 May 2010, and was scheduled to perform in the first half of the show. The running order for the semi-finals was decided through another draw on 23 March 2010 and Azerbaijan was set to perform in position 8, following the entry from Sweden and before the entry from Ukraine.

The two semi-finals and final were broadcast in Azerbaijan on İTV with commentary by Husniye Maharramova. The Azerbaijani spokesperson, who announced the Azerbaijani votes during the final, was Tamilla Shirinova.

=== Semi-final ===
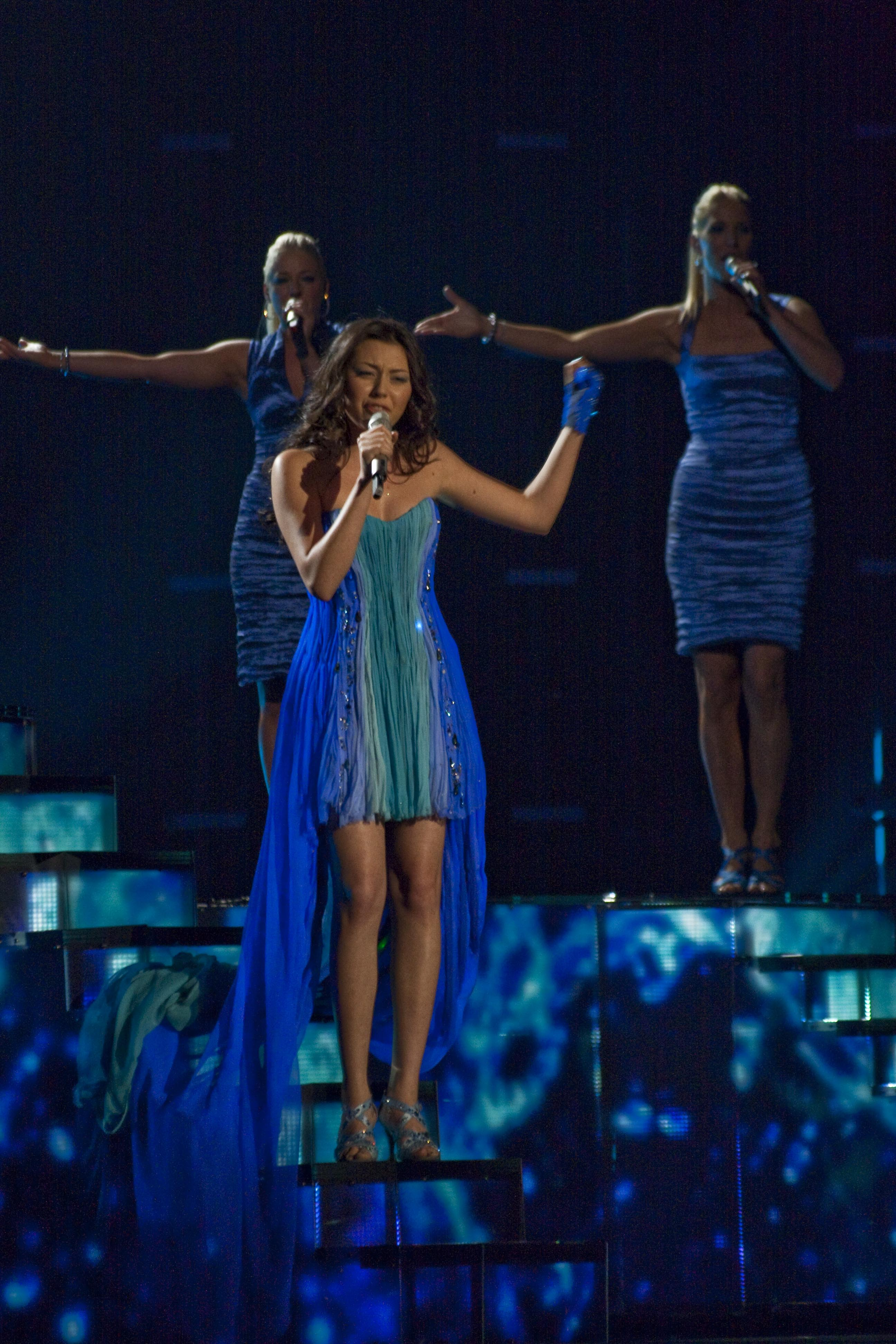
Safura during a rehearsal before the second semi-final

Safura took part in technical rehearsals on 19 and 22 May, followed by dress rehearsals on 26 and 27 May. This included the jury show on 26 May where the professional juries of each country watched and voted on the competing entries.

The Azerbaijani performance featured Safura in a turquoise and blue dress with LED elements that illuminated at the end of the song performing with a dancer and four backing vocalists. Two podiums with LED screens that displayed dripping water were featured on stage, one for Safura and one for the backing vocalists. Safura's podium also included a staircase which illuminated in a turquoise colour as she took each step down simultaneously with the backing vocalists at the beginning of the song. The dancer interacted with Safura during the second verse before the singer walked to the end of the catwalk and returned to the main stage to conclude the performance. The stage backdrop was dark and the lighting transitioned between white, green and blue colours. The performance was choreographed by JaQuel Knight. The dancer that joined Safura on stage was Denis Khrystyuk, while the backing vocalists were Anna Bergenholtz, Johanna Eriksson, Marlene Strand and Samantha Powell.

At the end of the show, Azerbaijan was announced as having finished in the top 10 and subsequently qualifying for the grand final. It was later revealed that Azerbaijan placed second in the semi-final, receiving a total of 113 points.

=== Final ===
Shortly after the second semi-final, a winners' press conference was held for the ten qualifying countries. As part of this press conference, the qualifying artists took part in a draw to determine the running order for the final. This draw was done in the order the countries were announced during the semi-final. Azerbaijan was drawn to perform in position 1, before the entry from Spain.

Safura once again took part in dress rehearsals on 28 and 29 May before the final, including the jury final where the professional juries cast their final votes before the live show. Safura performed a repeat of her semi-final performance during the final on 29 May. At the conclusion of the voting, Azerbaijan finished in fifth place with 145 points.

=== Voting ===
Voting during the three shows consisted of 50 percent public televoting and 50 percent from a jury deliberation. The jury consisted of five music industry professionals who were citizens of the country they represent. This jury was asked to judge each contestant based on: vocal capacity; the stage performance; the song's composition and originality; and the overall impression by the act. In addition, no member of a national jury could be related in any way to any of the competing acts in such a way that they cannot vote impartially and independently.

Following the release of the full split voting by the EBU after the conclusion of the competition, it was revealed that Azerbaijan had placed fifth with the public televote and ninth with the jury vote in the final. In the public vote, Azerbaijan scored 161 points, while with the jury vote, Azerbaijan scored 116 points. In the second semi-final, Azerbaijan placed first with the public televote with 126 points and third with the jury vote, scoring 89 points.

Below is a breakdown of points awarded to Azerbaijan and awarded by Azerbaijan in the second semi-final and grand final of the contest. The nation awarded its 12 points to Turkey in the semi-final and the final of the contest.

==== Points awarded to Azerbaijan ====
Points awarded to Azerbaijan (Semi-final 2)
Score	Country
12 points	Georgia; Turkey; Ukraine
10 points	Croatia; Cyprus; Ireland
8 points	Romania; Slovenia
7 points	Bulgaria
6 points	Switzerland
5 points	Denmark; Israel
4 points	
3 points	Sweden
2 points	Lithuania; Norway
1 point	Netherlands

Points awarded to Azerbaijan (Final)
Score	Country
12 points	Bulgaria; Malta; Turkey; Ukraine
10 points	Cyprus
8 points	Georgia; Poland; Russia
7 points	Bosnia and Herzegovina; Israel; Moldova; Norway; Spain
6 points	Belarus
5 points	Belgium
4 points	Iceland
3 points	Ireland; Macedonia
2 points	Denmark; Latvia; Switzerland
1 point	Greece

==== Points awarded by Azerbaijan ====
Points awarded by Azerbaijan (Semi-final 2)
Score	Country
12 points	Turkey
10 points	Georgia
8 points	Ukraine
7 points	Israel
6 points	Denmark
5 points	Romania
4 points	Ireland
3 points	Cyprus
2 points	Sweden
1 point	Croatia

Points awarded by Azerbaijan (Final)
Score	Country
12 points	Turkey
10 points	Ukraine
8 points	Georgia
7 points	Romania
6 points	Moldova
5 points	Israel
4 points	Denmark
3 points	Russia
2 points	United Kingdom
1 point	Germany
