= Georgia in the Eurovision Song Contest 2010 =

- Eurovision Song Contest 2010
- Participating broadcaster: Georgian Public Broadcaster (GPB)
- Country: Georgia
- Selection process: Artist: Internal selection Song: National final
- Selection date: Artist: 16 January 2010; Song: 27 February 2010

Competing entry
- Song: "Shine"
- Artist: Sofia Nizharadze
- Songwriters: Hanne Sørvaag; Harry Sommerdahl; Christian Leuzzi

Placement
- Semi-final result: Qualified (3rd, 106 points)
- Final result: 9th, 136 points

Participation chronology

Georgia was represented at the Eurovision Song Contest 2010 with the song "Shine", written by Hanne Sørvaag, Harry Sommerdahl, and Christian Leuzzi, and performed by Sofia Nizharadze. The Georgian participating broadcaster, the Georgian Public Broadcaster (GPB), selected its entry through a national final, after having previously selected the performer internally. In July 2009, GPB announced that it would be returning to the contest after a one-year absence following its withdrawal in 2009. The election of Nizharadze was announced on 16 January 2010. An open call for song submissions was held which resulted in the shortlisting of six entries that were presented to the public during a televised production on 27 February 2010. The results of a public televote combined with the votes of an expert jury resulted in the selection of "Shine" as the Georgian entry.

Georgia was drawn to compete in the second semi-final of the Eurovision Song Contest which took place on 27 May 2010. Performing during the show in position 16, "Shine" was announced among the top 10 entries of the second semi-final and therefore qualified to compete in the final on 29 May. It was later revealed that Georgia placed third out of the 17 participating countries in the semi-final with 106 points. In the final, Georgia performed in position 13 and placed ninth out of the 25 participating countries, scoring 136 points.

== Background ==
Prior to the 2010 contest, the Georgian Public Broadcaster (GPB) had participated in the Eurovision Song Contest representing Georgia two times since their first entry in 2007. Its highest placing in the contest, to this point, has been eleventh place, achieved in 2008 with the song "Peace Will Come" performed by Diana Gurtskaya. Georgia has managed to qualify to the final on both occasion the nation has participated in.

As part of its duties as participating broadcaster, GPB organises the selection of its entry in the Eurovision Song Contest and broadcasts the event in the country. The broadcaster announced in March 2009 that it would not participate in the 2009 contest after the European Broadcasting Union (EBU) rejected its entry, "We Don't Wanna Put In" performed by Stephane and 3G, for perceived political references to Vladimir Putin who was the Russian Prime Minister at the time. The withdrawal and fallout was tied to tense relations between Georgia and then host country Russia, which stemmed from the 2008 Russo-Georgian War. Following their one-year absence, GPB confirmed its intentions to participate at the 2010 contest on 18 July 2009. In 2007 and 2008, GPB had selected its entry via a national final. For its 2010 participation, the artist was selected internally, while the song was selected through a national final.

== Before Eurovision ==
=== Artist selection ===
On 16 January 2010, GPB held a press conference and announced that it had internally selected Sofia Nizharadze to represent Georgia in Oslo. During the press conference, GPB announced that a national final would be held to select her song.

=== National final ===
GPB opened a public song submission from 17 January 2010 until 3 February 2010. Over 100 songs were received by the submission deadline and an expert commission selected the top six songs from the received submissions, which were announced on 9 February 2010 and presented to the public on 24 February 2010. The six songs were performed by Sofia Nizharadze via a special programme on 27 February 2010 at the Tbilisi Event Hall in Tbilisi, hosted by Davit Katsarava and broadcast on the GPB First Channel as well as online at the broadcaster's website 1tv.ge and the official Eurovision Song Contest website eurovision.tv. The winning song, "Shine", was determined upon by the 50/50 combination of the votes of an expert jury and a public televote.

Final – 27 February 2010
R/O	Song	Songwriter(s)
1	"Our World"	Mikheil Mdinaradze
2	"Sing My Song"	Svika Pick
3	"Never Give In"	Tinatin Japaridze; Ben Robbins; Billy Livsey
4	"For Eternity"	Carlos Coelho; Andrej Babić
5	"Call Me"	Brandon Stone
6	"Shine"	Hanne Sørvaag; Harry Sommerdahl; Christian Leuzzi

=== Promotion ===
Prior to the contest, Sofia Nizharadze specifically promoted "Shine" as the Georgian Eurovision entry on 2 March 2010 by performing during the Azerbaijani national final. She also appeared in the first Ukrainian national final where Vasyl Lazarovych won.

== At Eurovision ==
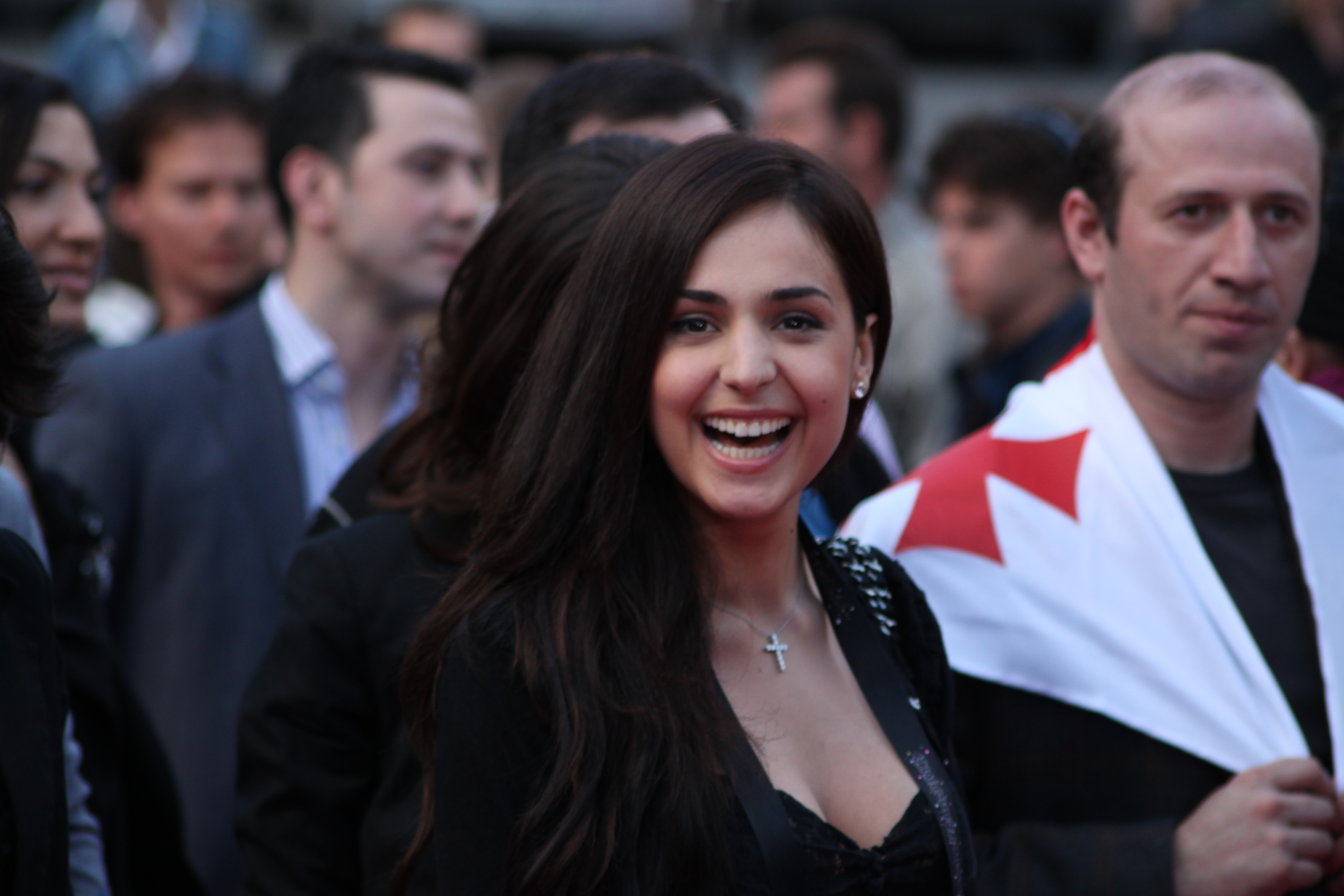
Sofia Nizharadze at the Eurovision Opening Party in Oslo

According to Eurovision rules, all nations with the exceptions of the host country and the "Big Four" (France, Germany, Spain and the United Kingdom) are required to qualify from one of two semi-finals in order to compete for the final; the top ten countries from each semi-final progress to the final. The European Broadcasting Union (EBU) split up the competing countries into six different pots based on voting patterns from previous contests, with countries with favourable voting histories put into the same pot. On 7 February 2010, a special allocation draw was held which placed each country into one of the two semi-finals, as well as which half of the show they would perform in. Georgia was placed into the second semi-final, to be held on 27 May 2010, and was scheduled to perform in the second half of the show. The running order for the semi-finals was decided through another draw on 23 March 2010 and Georgia was set to perform in position 16, following the entry from Croatia and before the entry from Turkey.

Both the semi-finals and the final were broadcast in Georgia on the GPB First Channel with commentary by Sopho Altunashvili. GPB appointed Mariam Vashadze as its spokesperson to announce the Georgian votes.

=== Semi-final ===
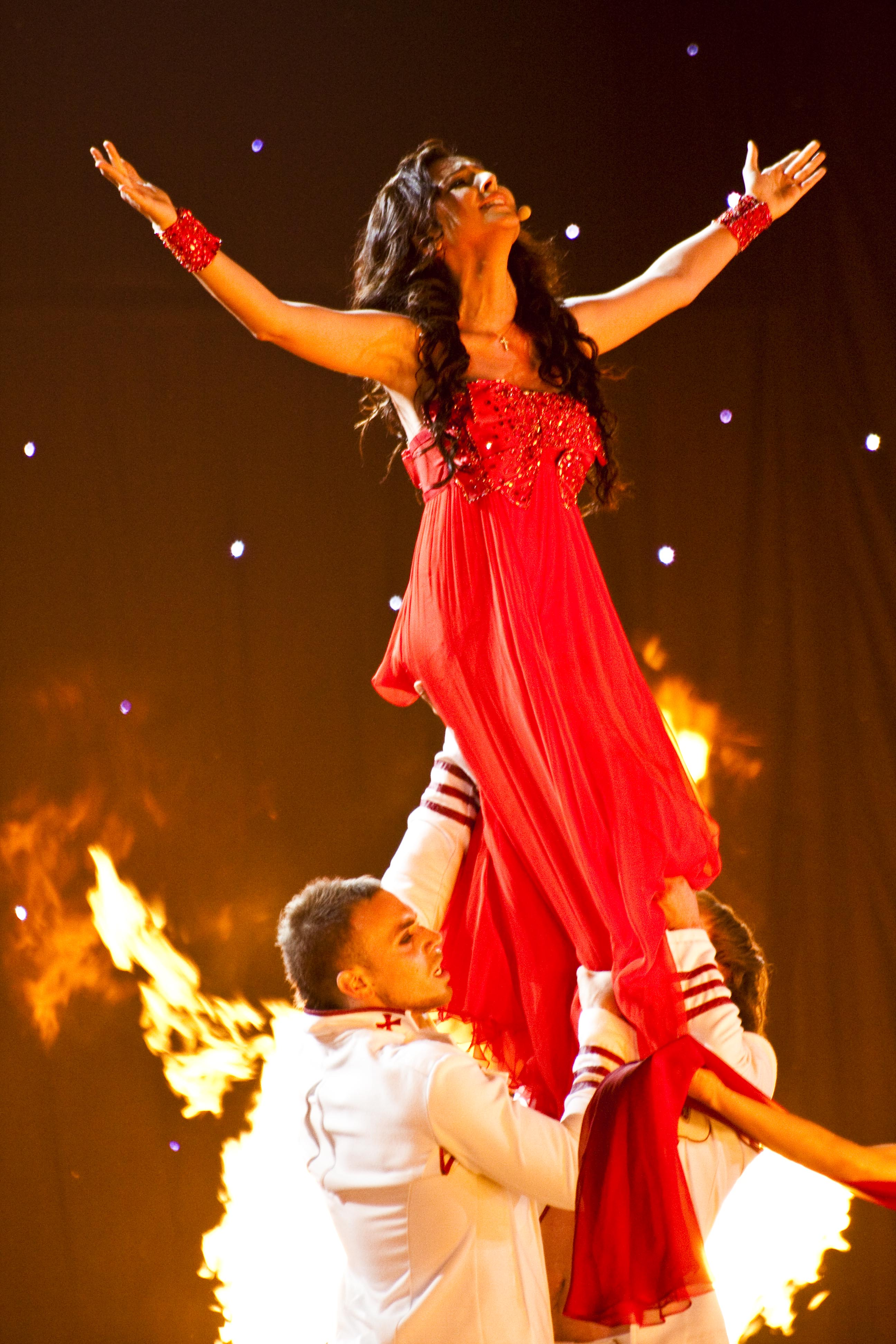
Sofia Nizharadze during a rehearsal before the second semi-final

Sofia Nizharadze took part in technical rehearsals on 19 and 23 May, followed by dress rehearsals on 26 and 27 May. This included the jury final on 26 May where the professional juries of each country watched and voted on the competing entries.

The Georgian performance featured Sofia Nizharadze in a red dress with Swarovski crystals attached, as well as red crystal bracelets. Nizharadze performed choreography with two dancers dressed in white suits, and was also joined on stage by a female dancer in a dark red dress with a red scarf as well as two backing vocalists in long white dresses. The performance also featured pyrotechnic flame effects and the use of a wind machine. The staging director for the Georgian performance was Redha Benteifour. The backing vocalists that joined Sofia Nizharadze were: Helen Kalandadze and Sopho Toroshelidze. Kalandadze would go on to co-host the Junior Eurovision Song Contest 2017, while Toroshelidze would go on to represent Georgia in 2011 as the lead singer of Eldrine.

At the end of the show, Georgia was announced as having finished in the top 10 and subsequently qualifying for the grand final. It was later revealed that Georgia placed third in the semi-final, receiving a total of 106 points.

=== Final ===
Shortly after the second semi-final, a winners' press conference was held for the ten qualifying countries. As part of this press conference, the qualifying artists took part in a draw to determine the running order for the final. This draw was done in the order the countries were announced during the semi-final. Georgia was drawn to perform in position 13, following the entry from the United Kingdom and before the entry from Turkey.

Sofia Nizharadze once again took part in dress rehearsals on 28 and 29 May before the final, including the jury final where the professional juries cast their final votes before the live show. Nizharadze performed a repeat of her semi-final performance during the final on 29 May. At the conclusion of the voting, Georgia finished in ninth place with 136 points.

=== Voting ===
Voting during the three shows consisted of 50 percent public televoting and 50 percent from a jury deliberation. Each participating broadcaster assembled a jury panel of five music industry professionals who were citizens of the country they represented. This jury was asked to judge each contestant based on: vocal capacity; the stage performance; the song's composition and originality; and the overall impression by the act. In addition, no member of a national jury could be related in any way to any of the competing acts in such a way that they cannot vote impartially and independently.

Following the release of the full split voting by the EBU after the conclusion of the competition, it was revealed that Georgia had placed ninth with the public televote and fourth with the jury vote in the final. In the public vote, Georgia scored 127 points, while with the jury vote, Georgia scored 160 points. In the second semi-final, Georgia placed fifth with the public televote with 102 points and first with the jury vote, scoring 117 points.

Below is a breakdown of points awarded to Georgia and awarded by Georgia in the second semi-final and grand final of the contest. The nation awarded its 12 points to Azerbaijan in the semi-final and to Belarus in the final of the contest.

==== Points awarded to Georgia ====
Points awarded to Georgia (Semi-final 2)
Score	Country
12 points	Armenia; Lithuania
10 points	Azerbaijan; Bulgaria; Turkey
8 points	
7 points	Croatia; Cyprus; Ireland; Slovenia; Ukraine
6 points	Israel
5 points	Netherlands
4 points	
3 points	
2 points	Romania; Sweden
1 point	Switzerland; United Kingdom

Points awarded to Georgia (Final)
Score	Country
12 points	Armenia; Lithuania
10 points	Russia
8 points	Azerbaijan; Estonia
7 points	Belarus; Croatia; Ukraine
6 points	Bulgaria; Sweden
5 points	Cyprus; Greece; Ireland; Israel; Macedonia; Moldova; Turkey
4 points	Belgium; Bosnia and Herzegovina; Poland
3 points	
2 points	Iceland
1 point	Norway; Slovenia; Spain; Switzerland

==== Points awarded by Georgia ====
Points awarded by Georgia (Semi-final 2)
Score	Country
12 points	Azerbaijan
10 points	Armenia
8 points	Lithuania
7 points	Ukraine
6 points	Turkey
5 points	Israel
4 points	Romania
3 points	Denmark
2 points	Switzerland
1 point	Netherlands

Points awarded by Georgia (Final)
Score	Country
12 points	Belarus
10 points	Armenia
8 points	Azerbaijan
7 points	Ukraine
6 points	Norway
5 points	Turkey
4 points	Israel
3 points	United Kingdom
2 points	Spain
1 point	Moldova
