= Denmark in the Eurovision Song Contest 2010 =

- Eurovision Song Contest 2010
- Participating broadcaster: Danmarks Radio (DR)
- Country: Denmark
- Selection process: Dansk Melodi Grand Prix 2010
- Selection date: 6 February 2010

Competing entry
- Song: "In a Moment like This"
- Artist: Chanée and N'evergreen
- Songwriters: Thomas G:son; Henrik Sethsson; Erik Bernholm

Placement
- Semi-final result: Qualified (5th, 101 points)
- Final result: 4th, 149 points

Participation chronology

Denmark was represented at the Eurovision Song Contest 2010 with the song "In a Moment like This", written by Thomas G:son, Henrik Sethsson, and Erik Bernholm, and performed by Chanée and N'evergreen. The Danish participating broadcaster, Danmarks Radio (DR), organised the national final Dansk Melodi Grand Prix 2010 in order to select its entry for the contest. Ten songs competed in a televised show where the winner was selected over three rounds of voting. The results of the first round were decided upon through the combination of jury voting and public voting while the results in the second and third round were determined solely by public televoting. "In a Moment like This" performed by Chanée and N'evergreen was the winner after gaining the most public votes in the third round.

Denmark was drawn to compete in the second semi-final of the Eurovision Song Contest which took place on 27 May 2010. Performing during the show in position 4, "In a Moment like This" was announced among the top 10 entries of the second semi-final and therefore qualified to compete in the final on 29 May. It was later revealed that Denmark placed fifth out of the 17 participating countries in the semi-final with 101 points. In the final, Denmark was the closing performance of the show in position 25, placing fourth out of the 25 participating countries with 149 points.

== Background ==
Prior to the 2010 contest, Danmarks Radio (DR) had participated in the Eurovision Song Contest representing Denmark thirty-eight times since its first entry in 1957. It had won the contest, to this point, on two occasions: in 1963 with the song "Dansevise" performed by Grethe and Jørgen Ingmann, and in 2000 with the song "Fly on the Wings of Love" performed by Olsen Brothers. In 2009, "Believe Again" performed by Brinck qualified to the final placing thirteenth.

As part of its duties as participating broadcaster, DR organises the selection of its entry in the Eurovision Song Contest and broadcasts the event in the country. The broadcaster confirmed its intentions to participate at the 2010 contest on 27 August 2009. DR has selected all of its Eurovision entries through the national final Dansk Melodi Grand Prix. Along with its participation confirmation, the broadcaster announced that Dansk Melodi Grand Prix 2010 would be organised in order to select its entry for the 2010 contest.

== Before Eurovision ==
=== Dansk Melodi Grand Prix 2010 ===
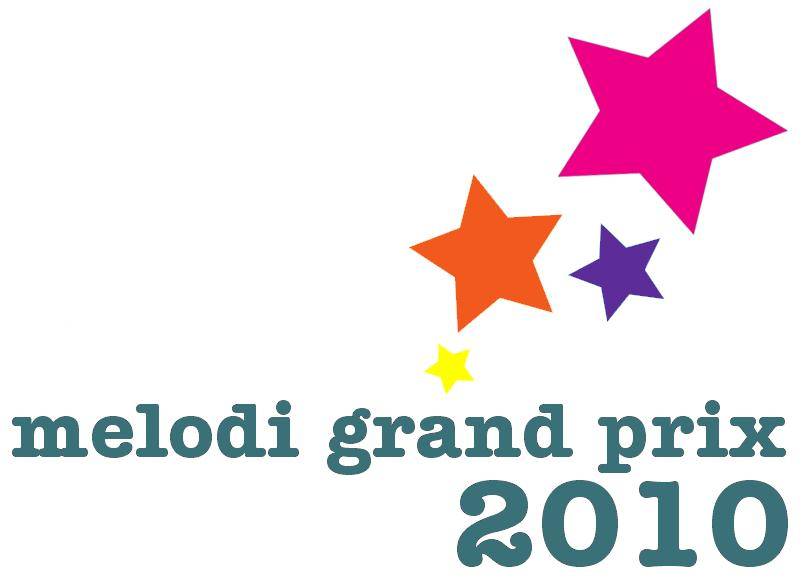
The logo of Dansk Melodi Grand Prix 2010

Dansk Melodi Grand Prix 2010 was the 40th edition of Dansk Melodi Grand Prix, the music competition that selects Denmark's entries for the Eurovision Song Contest. The event was held on 6 February 2010 at the Gigantium in Aalborg, hosted by Felix Smith and Julie Berthelsen with assistance by Jørgen de Mylius and Keld Heick. The show was televised on DR1 as well as streamed online at the official DR website. The national final was watched by 1.864 million viewers in Denmark, making it the most watched edition of Dansk Melodi Grand Prix since 2005.

==== Format ====
Ten songs competed in one show where the winner was determined over three rounds of voting. In the first round, the top four songs based on the combination of votes from a public televote and a six-member jury panel qualified to the second round. In the second round, the four songs competed in two duels and the winner of each duel as determined exclusively by the public vote qualified to the final round, where the winner was determined again exclusively by the public vote. Viewers were able to vote via SMS.

The six-member jury panel was composed of:

- Paw Lagermann – singer-songwriter and music producer
- Camille Jones – singer-songwriter and producer
- Søs Fenger – singer-songwriter
- Kenneth Kreutzmann – choreographer and stage director
- Lars Pedersen (Chief 1) – DJ, singer and music producer
- Bent Fabricius-Bjerre – composer

==== Competing entries ====
DR opened a submission period between 27 August 2009 and 5 October 2009 for artists and composers to submit their entries. The broadcaster received 562 entries during the submission period. A selection committee selected six songs from the entries submitted to the broadcaster, while four of the participants were invited to compete based on editorial considerations. DR held a press meet and greet at the DR Byen in Copenhagen on 12 January 2010 where the competing artists and songs were announced and officially presented. Less than 24 hours to the presentation, "All About Me" written and performed by Zindy Laursen, who was invited by DR for the competition, was withdrawn and replaced with the song "Panik!" performed by MariaMatilde Band from the public submissions.

| Artist | Song | Songwriter(s) | Selection |
|---|---|---|---|
| Bryan Rice | "Breathing" | Peter Bjørnskov | Invited by DR |
| Chanée and N'evergreen | "In a Moment like This" | Thomas G:son, Henrik Sethsson, Erik Bernholm | Open submission |
| Jens Marni | "Gloria" | Svend Gudiksen, Johannes Jørgensen, Noam Halby | Open submission |
| Joakim Tranberg | "All About a Girl" | Lars Halvor Jensen, Martin Michael Larsson, Ronan Keating | Open submission |
| Kaya Brüel | "Only Tonight" | Kaya Brüel | Invited by DR |
| MariaMatilde Band | "Panik!" | Maria Sejer, Matilde Kühl, Mads Haugaard, Marcus Winther-John | Open submission |
| Silas and Kat | "Come Come Run Away" | Lise Cabble, Simon Munk | Open submission |
| Simone | "How Will I Know" | Jacob Launbjerg, Andreas Mørck | Open submission |
| Sukkerchok | "Kæmper for kærlighed" | Lasse Lindorff, Martin Michael Larsson, Lise Cabble | Invited by DR |
| Thomas Barsøe | "Just Like Rain" | Patrick Jonsson, Joakim Övrenius, Thomas Karlsson, Thomas Barsøe | Open submission |

==== Final ====
The final took place on 6 February 2010. In the first round of voting the top four advanced to the superfinal based on the votes of a six-member jury (50%) and a public televote (50%). In the second round, four songs faced off each other in two duels and a public vote selected the winners of each duel that advanced to the final round. In the final round, the winner, "In a Moment like This" performed by Chanée and N'evergreen, was selected solely by a public vote.

Final – 6 February 2010
| R/O | Artist | Song | Result |
|---|---|---|---|
| 1 | Bryan Rice | "Breathing" | Advanced |
| 2 | Joakim Tranberg | "All About a Girl" | —N/a |
| 3 | MariaMatilde Band | "Panik!" | —N/a |
| 4 | Simone | "How Will I Know" | Advanced |
| 5 | Jens Marni | "Gloria" | —N/a |
| 6 | Chanée and N'evergreen | "In a Moment like This" | Advanced |
| 7 | Kaya Brüel | "Only Tonight" | —N/a |
| 8 | Thomas Barsøe | "Just Like Rain" | —N/a |
| 9 | Sukkerchok | "Kæmper for kærlighed" | —N/a |
| 10 | Silas and Kat | "Come Come Run Away" | Advanced |

Second Round – 6 February 2010
| Duel | R/O | Artist | Song | Result |
|---|---|---|---|---|
| I | 1 | Simone | "How Will I Know" | —N/a |
| I | 2 | Chanée and N'evergreen | "In a Moment like This" | Advanced |
| II | 3 | Silas and Kat | "Come Come Run Away" | —N/a |
| II | 4 | Bryan Rice | "Breathing" | Advanced |

Final Round – 6 February 2010
| R/O | Artist | Song | Place |
|---|---|---|---|
| 1 | Chanée and N'evergreen | "In a Moment like This" | 1 |
| 2 | Bryan Rice | "Breathing" | 2 |

== At Eurovision ==
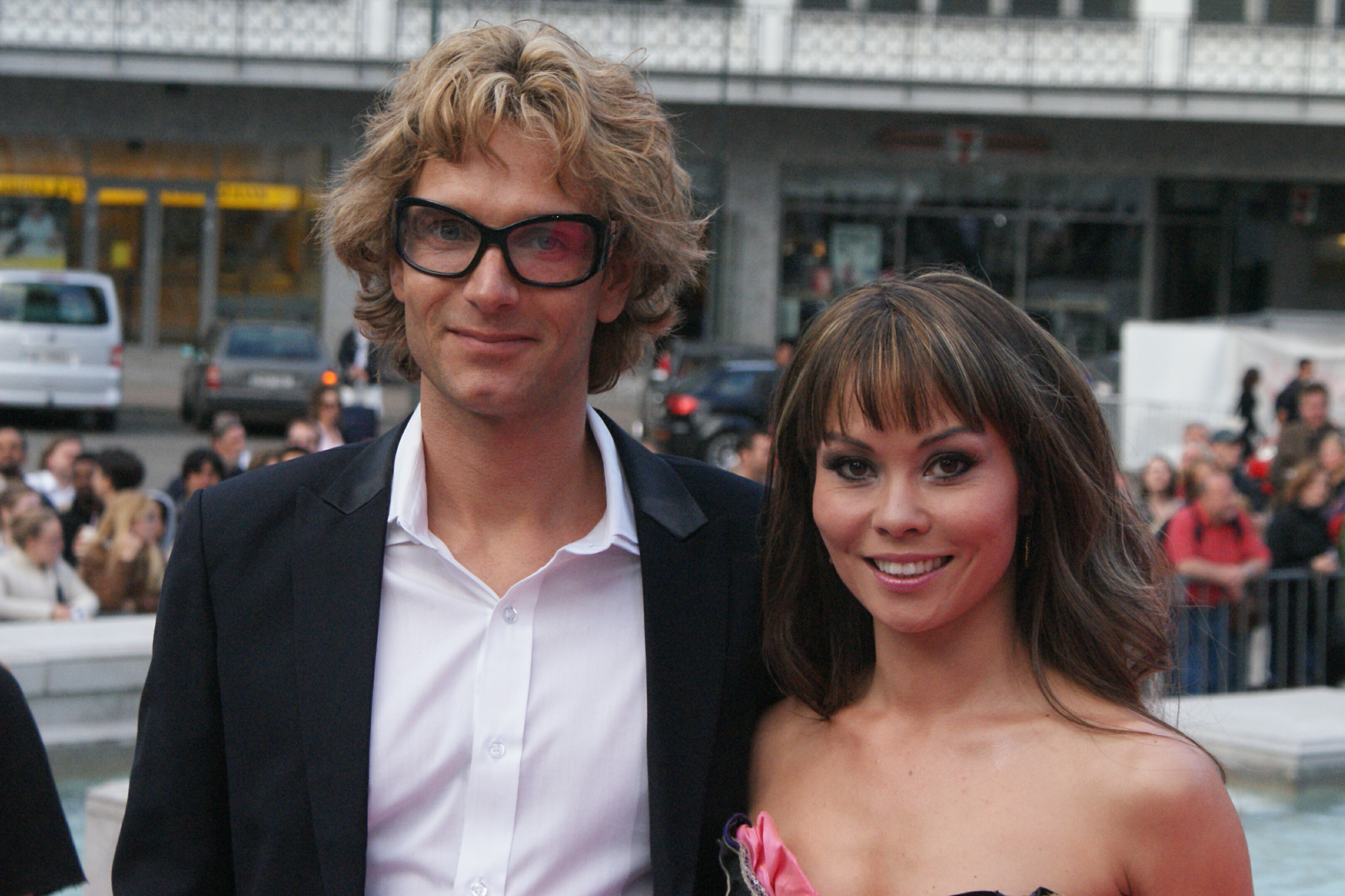
Chanée and N'evergreen at the Eurovision Opening Party in Oslo

According to Eurovision rules, all nations with the exceptions of the host country and the "Big Four" (France, Germany, Spain and the United Kingdom) were required to qualify from one of two semi-finals in order to compete for the final; the top ten countries from each semi-final progress to the final. The European Broadcasting Union (EBU) split up the competing countries into six different pots based on voting patterns from previous contests, with countries with favourable voting histories put into the same pot. On 7 February 2010, an allocation draw was held which placed each country into one of the two semi-finals, as well as which half of the show they would perform in. Denmark was placed into the second semi-final, to be held on 27 May 2010, and was scheduled to perform in the first half of the show. The running order for the semi-finals was decided through another draw on 23 March 2010 and Denmark was set to perform in position 4, following the entry from Israel and before the entry from Switzerland.

The two semi-finals and final were broadcast on DR1 with commentary by Nicolai Molbech. It was then re-broadcast on 26 June 2010 at 13:47 (CEST). DR appointed Bryan Rice as its spokesperson to announce the Danish votes during the final.

=== Semi-final ===
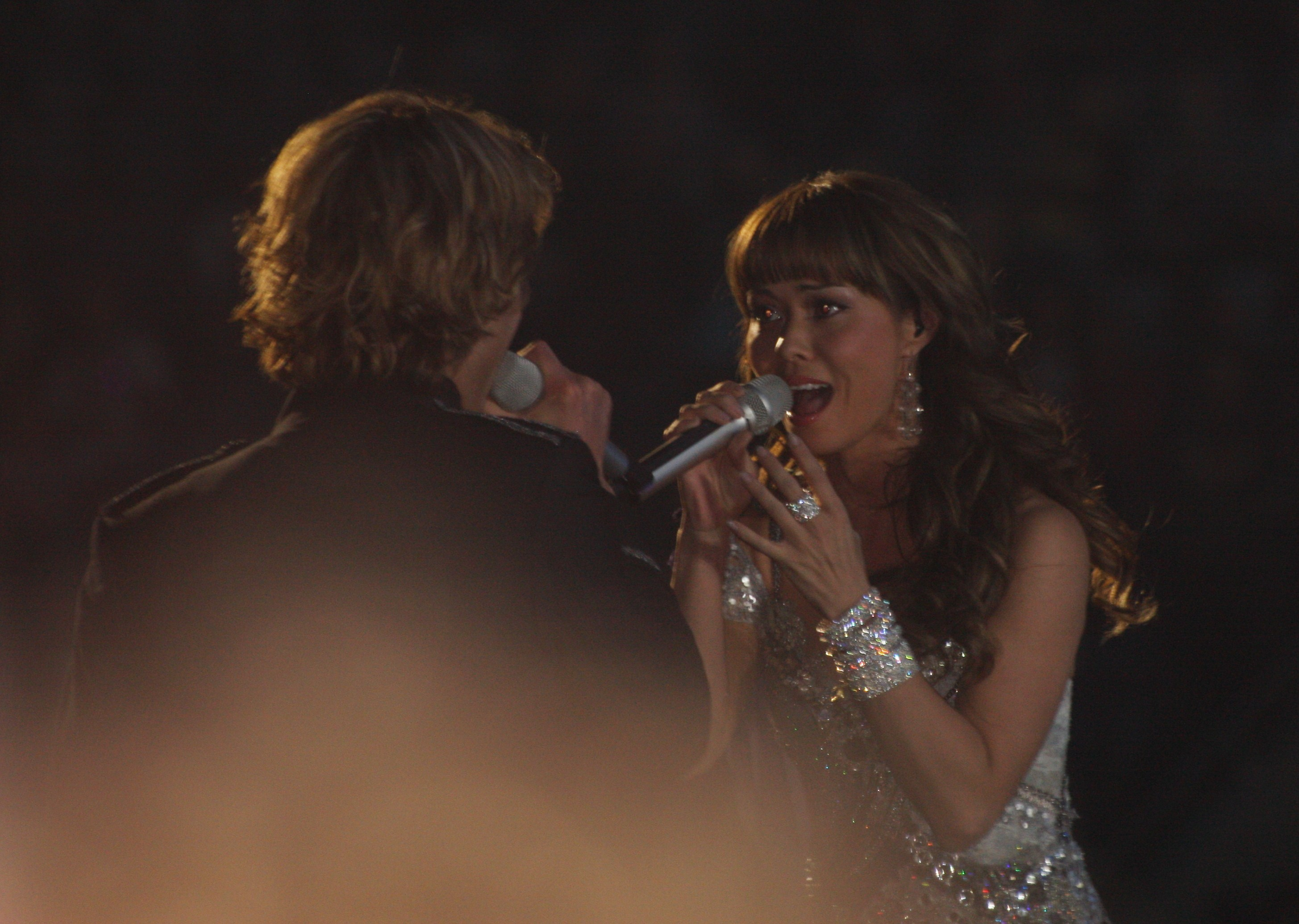
Chanée and N'evergreen during a rehearsal before the second semi-final

Chanée and N'evergreen took part in technical rehearsals on 18 and 21 May, followed by dress rehearsals on 26 and 27 May. This included the jury show on 26 May where the professional juries of each country watched and voted on the competing entries.

The Danish performance featured Chanée and N'evergreen performing with four backing vocalists; Chanée was in a silver and blue dress while N'evergreen was dressed in a black jacket and trousers with a blue t-shirt. The performance began with Chanée and N'evergreen standing behind each other on the sides of a see-through frosted screen which produced silhouettes whilst the other is singing their part. Chanée and N'evergreen then made use of an equipment which slid them apart from each other to opposite ends of the stage before moving back towards each other and finished the performance on the stage catwalk accompanied by a wind machine and a pyrotechnic effect. The stage colours were predominantly dark and the lighting transitioned from violet to between red, white, blue and yellow. The four backing vocalists that joined Chanée and N'evergreen were: Anne Murillo, Gry Trampedach Jørgensen, Jaana Vähämäki and Mads Enggaard Jørgensen.

At the end of the show, Denmark was announced as having finished in the top ten and subsequently qualifying for the grand final. It was later revealed that Denmark placed fifth in the semi-final, receiving a total of 101 points.

=== Final ===
Shortly after the second semi-final, a winners' press conference was held for the ten qualifying countries. As part of this press conference, the qualifying artists took part in a draw to determine the running order for the final. This draw was done in the order the countries were announced during the semi-final. Denmark was drawn to perform last in position 25, following the entry from Israel.

Chanée and N'evergreen once again took part in dress rehearsals on 28 and 29 May before the final, including the jury final where the professional juries cast their final votes before the live show. The duo performed a repeat of their semi-final performance during the final on 29 May. At the conclusion of the voting, Denmark finished in fourth place with 149 points.

=== Voting ===
Voting during the three shows consisted of 50 percent public televoting and 50 percent from a jury deliberation. The jury consisted of five music industry professionals who were citizens of the country they represent. This jury was asked to judge each contestant based on: vocal capacity; the stage performance; the song's composition and originality; and the overall impression by the act. In addition, no member of a national jury could be related in any way to any of the competing acts in such a way that they cannot vote impartially and independently.

Following the release of the full split voting by the EBU after the conclusion of the competition, it was revealed that Denmark had placed third with the public televote and seventh with the jury vote in the final. In the public vote, Denmark scored 174 points, while with the jury vote, Denmark scored 121 points. In the second semi-final, Denmark placed fourth with the public televote with 106 points and seventh with the jury vote, scoring 83 points.

Below is a breakdown of points awarded to Denmark and awarded by Denmark in the second semi-final and grand final of the contest. The nation awarded its 12 points to Sweden in the semi-final and to Germany in the final of the contest.

==== Points awarded to Denmark ====
Points awarded to Denmark (Semi-final 2)
| Score | Country |
|---|---|
| 12 points | Romania; Sweden |
| 10 points | Slovenia |
| 8 points | Norway |
| 7 points | Israel |
| 6 points | Azerbaijan; Turkey |
| 5 points | Armenia; Lithuania; Switzerland; Ukraine |
| 4 points | Croatia; Ireland; Netherlands |
| 3 points | Cyprus; Georgia |
| 2 points | Bulgaria |
| 1 point | |

Points awarded to Denmark (Final)
| Score | Country |
|---|---|
| 12 points | Iceland; Ireland; Poland; Romania; Slovenia |
| 10 points | Latvia |
| 8 points | Malta; Norway; Sweden |
| 7 points | Slovakia |
| 6 points | United Kingdom |
| 5 points | Armenia; Estonia |
| 4 points | Azerbaijan; Israel; Portugal; Spain |
| 3 points | Lithuania |
| 2 points | Albania; Belgium; Croatia; Finland; Macedonia; Netherlands |
| 1 point | Russia |

==== Points awarded by Denmark ====
Points awarded by Denmark (Semi-final 2)
| Score | Country |
|---|---|
| 12 points | Sweden |
| 10 points | Turkey |
| 8 points | Romania |
| 7 points | Cyprus |
| 6 points | Ireland |
| 5 points | Azerbaijan |
| 4 points | Netherlands |
| 3 points | Ukraine |
| 2 points | Croatia |
| 1 point | Lithuania |

Points awarded by Denmark (Final)
| Score | Country |
|---|---|
| 12 points | Germany |
| 10 points | Belgium |
| 8 points | Romania |
| 7 points | France |
| 6 points | Turkey |
| 5 points | Norway |
| 4 points | Portugal |
| 3 points | Iceland |
| 2 points | Azerbaijan |
| 1 point | Cyprus |
