= Bulgaria in the Eurovision Song Contest 2010 =

- Eurovision Song Contest 2010
- Participating broadcaster: Bulgarian National Television (BNT)
- Country: Bulgaria
- Selection process: Artist: Internal selection Song: Bŭlgarskata pesen v „Evroviziya 2010”
- Selection date: Artist: 18 October 2009; Song: 28 February 2010

Competing entry
- Song: "Angel si ti"
- Artist: Miro
- Songwriters: Miroslav Kostadinov; Mihail Mihailov; Gordon Davis

Placement
- Semi-final result: Failed to qualify (15th)

Participation chronology

Bulgaria was represented at the Eurovision Song Contest 2010 with the song "Angel si ti", written by Miroslav Kostadinov, Mihail Mihailov, and Gordon Davis, and performed by Kostadinov himself under his stage name Miro. The Bulgarian participating broadcaster, Bulgarian National Television (BNT), announced in October 2009 that it had selected Miro to compete at the contest. The broadcaster organised the national final Bŭlgarskata pesen v „Evroviziya 2010” in order to select the song that Miro competed with. Five songs were selected to participate in the national final, held on 28 February 2010, where "Angel si ti" emerged as the winning song with 48.05% of the public televote.

Bulgaria was drawn to compete in the second semi-final of the Eurovision Song Contest which took place on 27 May 2010. Performing during the show in position 13, "Angel si ti" was not announced among the top 10 entries of the second semi-final and therefore did not qualify to compete in the final. It was later revealed that Bulgaria placed fifteenth out of the 17 participating countries in the semi-final with 19 points.

== Background ==
Prior to the 2010 contest, Bulgarian National Television (BNT) had participated in the Eurovision Song Contest representing Bulgaria five times since its first entry in 2005. It achieved its best result in 2007 with the song "Water" performed by Elitsa Todorova and Stoyan Yankoulov, which placed fifth. To this point, their 2007 entry is also the only Bulgarian entry to have qualified to the Eurovision final; the nation had failed to qualify to the final with their other three entries. In 2009, "Illusion" by Krassimir Avramov failed to qualify to the final.

As part of its duties as participating broadcaster, BNT organises the selection of its entry in the Eurovision Song Contest and broadcasts the event in the country. The broadcaster confirmed its participation in the 2010 contest on 21 September 2009. Since 2005, the broadcaster has organised a national final in order to select its entry for the competition. For its 2010 entry, BNT broadcaster internally selected the artist that would perform several songs during a national final.

== Before Eurovision ==
=== Artist selection ===
On 18 October 2009, it was announced during the BNT 1 programme V nedelya s…, hosted by Dimitar Tsonev, that a 51-member committee had internally selected Miro to represent Bulgaria in Oslo. The committee consisted of composers, poets, musicians, music educators, institutions and the media, each of them which proposed a performer for the competition. Miro previously attempted to represent Bulgaria in the Eurovision Song Contest 2007 as part of the duo KariZma, placing second in the national final with the song "Fool for You". It was also announced that a national final would be organised to select Miro's song.

Selection committee members
Group	Members
Composers	Aleksandar Brazitsov; Aleksandar Kiprov; Atanas Kosev; Angel Zaberski; Atanas Kosev; Boris Karadimchev; Boris Chakarov; Dimitar Getov; Emil Boyadzhiev; Haygashod Agasyan; Kristiyan Boyadzhiev; Magomed Aliyev-Maga; Mitko Shterev; Nayden Andreev; Stefan Dimitrov; Toncho Rusev; Petar Dundakov; Plamen Velinov; Zhivko Petrov
Poets	Alexander Petrov; Ivan Tenev; Margarita Petkova; Yavor Kirin; Zhivko Kolev
Musicians and music educators	Dora Hristova; Hristo Dimitrov; Hristo Yotsov; Ivan Lechev; Ivan Nestorov; Konstantin Markov; Konstantin Tsekov; Mihail Yosifov; Misho Shishkov; Momchil Kolev; Rumen Boyadzhiev; Rumen Toskov; Vasil Parmakov; Veselin Todorov
Institutions and media	24 Chasa; BG Radio; Bulgarian News Agency; Darik Radio; MMTV; National School of Folk Arts "Shiroka Laka"; National Academy of Music "Prof. Pancho Vladigerov"; National Music School "Lyubomir Pipkov"; Trud; Union of Bulgarian Composers; Union of Bulgarian Musicians and Dancers

Artist selection (Top 9) – 18 October 2009
Artist	Points	Place
Miro	10	1
Poli Genova	7	2
Nora Karaivanova	3	3
Elitsa Todorova and Stoyan Yankoulov	2	4
Georgi Hristov	2	4
Lili Ivanova	2	4
Maria Ilieva	2	4
Orlin Pavlov	2	4
Vesela Boneva	2	4

=== Bŭlgarskata pesen v „Evroviziya 2010” ===
On 30 October 2009, BNT opened a submission period for songwriters to submit their songs until 15 January 2010. Songs were required to contain partial Bulgarian involvement. By the end of the deadline, the broadcaster received 87 songs. On 5 February 2010, the five songs selected for the competition were presented during the BNT 1 programme Po sveta i u nas, hosted by Dragomir Draganov. The national final took place on 28 February 2010 at the National Palace of Culture in Sofia, hosted by Dragomir Draganov and broadcast on BNT 1 as well as online via the broadcaster's website bnt.bg and the official Eurovision Song Contest website eurovision.tv. All five competing songs were performed by Miro and "Angel si ti" was selected as the winning song exclusively by public televoting. In addition to the performances of the songs, guest performers were Akaga and 2008 Bulgarian Eurovision entrants Deep Zone Project.

Final – 28 February 2010
R/O	Song	Songwriter(s)	Televote	Place
1	"Eagle"	Yasen Kozev, Krum Georgiev	12.47%	3
2	"Moyat pogled v teb" (Моят поглед в теб)	Dejan Kamenov, Dimitar Karnev, Alexander Obretenov, Vasil Vutev, Rumen Gaydev	3.53%	5
3	"Twist and Tango"	Thomas Thörnholm, Petar Panov, Danne Atlerud	27.42%	2
4	"Ostani" (Остани)	Nayden Andreev, Ivan Tenev, Alexander Petrov	8.53%	4
5	"Angel si ti" (Ангел си ти)	Miroslav Kostadinov, Mihail Mihailov	48.05%	1

=== Promotion ===
Miro made several appearances across Europe to specifically promote "Angel si ti" as the Bulgarian Eurovision entry. On 5 March, Miro performed "Angel si ti" during the first Ukrainian Eurovision national final. Miro also performed the song during the Greek Eurovision national final on 12 March. On 20 March, Miro took part in promotional activities in Romania where he performed during the TVR shows Atenţie, se cântă!, Dănutz SRL and Ne vedem la TVR. On 24 April, Miro performed during the Eurovision in Concert event which was held at the Lexion venue in Zaanstad, Netherlands and hosted by Cornald Maas and Marga Bult.

== At Eurovision ==
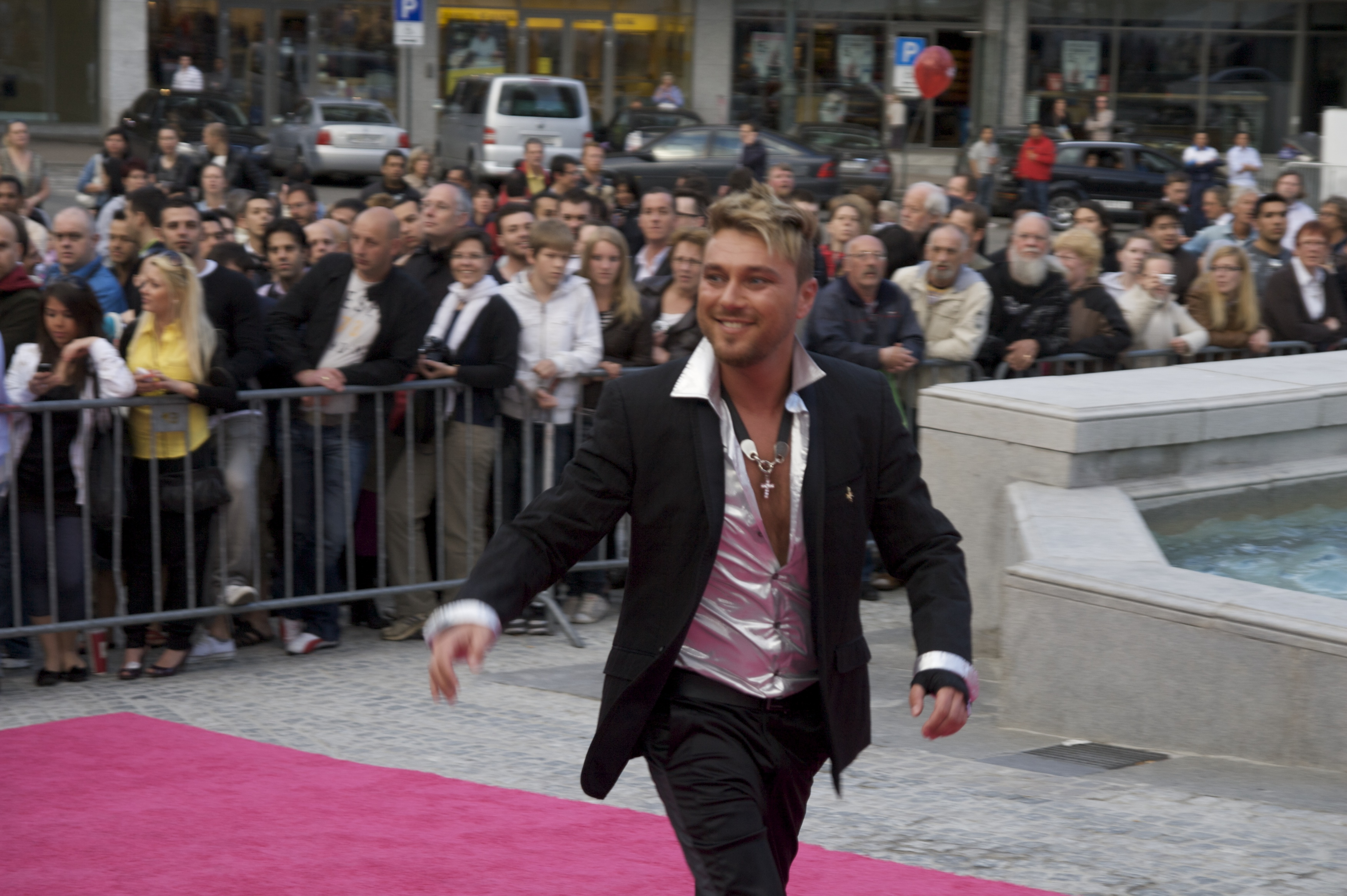
Miro at the Eurovision Opening Party in Oslo

According to Eurovision rules, all nations with the exceptions of the host country and the "Big Four" (France, Germany, Spain and the United Kingdom) were required to qualify from one of two semi-finals in order to compete for the final; the top ten countries from each semi-final progress to the final. The European Broadcasting Union (EBU) split up the competing countries into six different pots based on voting patterns from previous contests, with countries with favourable voting histories put into the same pot. On 7 February 2010, a special allocation draw was held which placed each country into one of the two semi-finals, as well as which half of the show they would perform in. Bulgaria was placed into the second semi-final, to be held on 27 May 2010, and was scheduled to perform in the second half of the show. The running order for the semi-finals was decided through another draw on 23 March 2010 and as one of the five wildcard countries, Bulgaria chose to perform in position 13, following the entry from Ireland and before the entry from Cyprus.

The two semi-finals and the final were broadcast in Bulgaria on BNT 1 with commentary by Elena Rosberg and Georgi Kushvaliev. The Bulgarian spokesperson, who announced the Bulgarian votes during the final, was Desislava Dobreva.

=== Semi-final ===
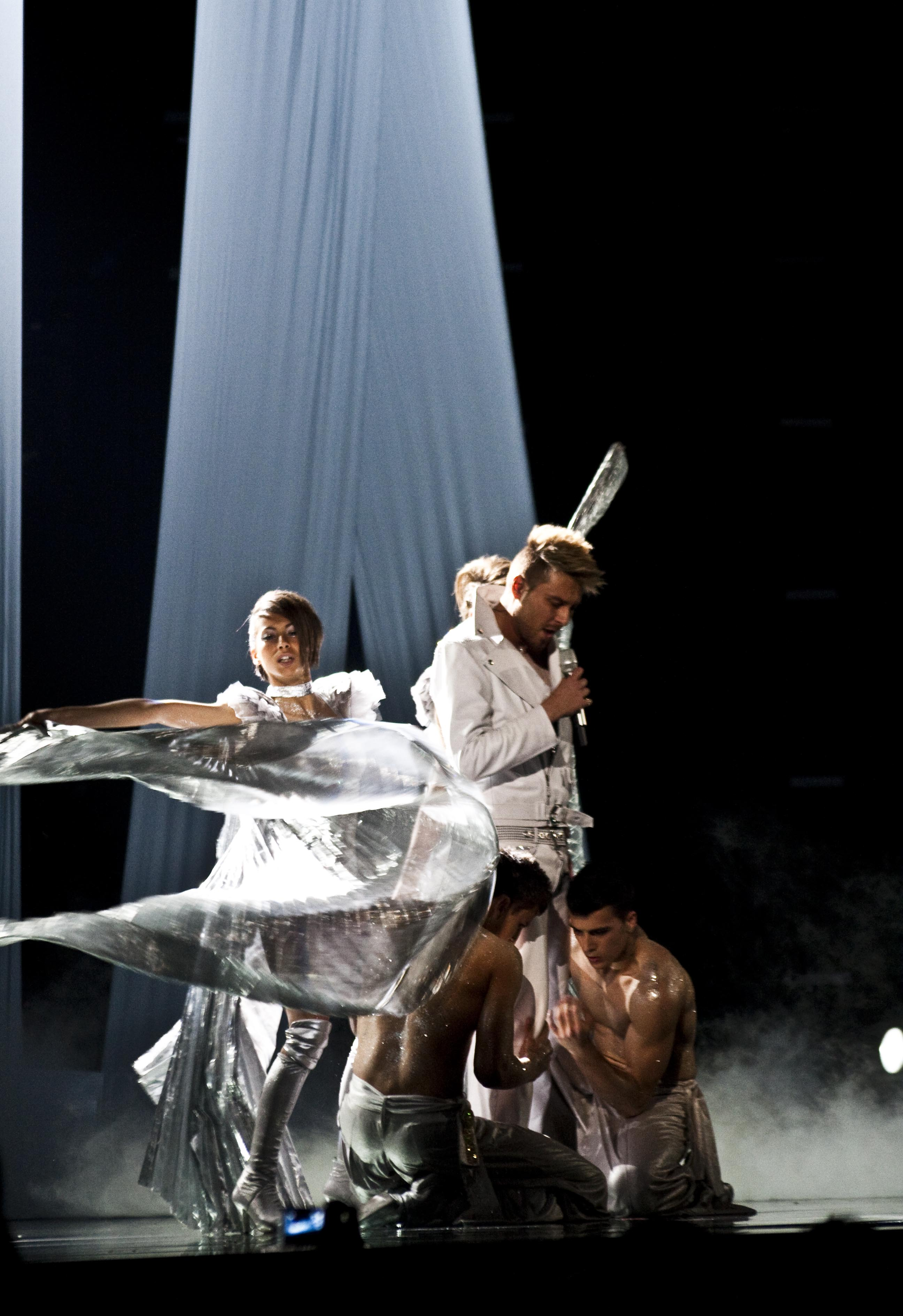
Miro during a rehearsal before the second semi-final

Miro took part in technical rehearsals on 19 and 23 May, followed by dress rehearsals on 26 and 27 May. This included the jury show on 26 May where the professional juries of each country watched and voted on the competing entries.

The Bulgarian performance featured Miro performing in a white leather suit, joined on stage by two female dancers wearing angel wings and two male dancers. The stage featured silver drapes which retracted to reveal white flashing lights in the background that transitioned to orange lighting during the chorus. The performance also featured the use of smoke effects. The choreography for the Bulgarian performance was developed by British director Venol King. Among the four dancers that joined Miro were Aleksandar Boychev, Eli Radanova and Vyara Panteleeva. The backing performers were chosen by BNT together with the singer during an audition held in February 2010.

At the end of the show, Bulgaria was not announced among the top 10 entries in the second semi-final and therefore failed to qualify to compete in the final. It was later revealed that Bulgaria placed fifteenth in the semi-final, receiving a total of 19 points.

=== Voting ===
Voting during the three shows consisted of 50 percent public televoting and 50 percent from a jury deliberation. The jury consisted of five music industry professionals who were citizens of the country they represent. This jury was asked to judge each contestant based on: vocal capacity; the stage performance; the song's composition and originality; and the overall impression by the act. In addition, no member of a national jury could be related in any way to any of the competing acts in such a way that they cannot vote impartially and independently.

Following the release of the full split voting by the EBU after the conclusion of the competition, it was revealed that the Bulgaria had placed fifteenth with both the public televote and the jury vote in the second semi-final. In the public vote, Bulgaria scored 15 points, while with the jury vote, Bulgaria scored 25 points.

Below is a breakdown of points awarded to Bulgaria and awarded by Bulgaria in the second semi-final and grand final of the contest. The nation awarded its 12 points to Turkey in the semi-final and to Azerbaijan in the final of the contest.

==== Points awarded to Bulgaria ====
Points awarded to Bulgaria (Semi-final 2)
Score	Country
12 points	
10 points	
8 points	
7 points	Turkey
6 points	United Kingdom
5 points	Cyprus
4 points	
3 points	
2 points	
1 point	Ukraine

==== Points awarded by Bulgaria ====
Points awarded by Bulgaria (Semi-final 2)
Score	Country
12 points	Turkey
10 points	Georgia
8 points	Armenia
7 points	Azerbaijan
6 points	Ukraine
5 points	Cyprus
4 points	Romania
3 points	Croatia
2 points	Denmark
1 point	Israel

Points awarded by Bulgaria (Final)
Score	Country
12 points	Azerbaijan
10 points	Turkey
8 points	Armenia
7 points	Ukraine
6 points	Georgia
5 points	Greece
4 points	Cyprus
3 points	Germany
2 points	Spain
1 point	Belarus
