= Netherlands in the Eurovision Song Contest 2010 =

- Eurovision Song Contest 2010
- Participating broadcaster: Televisie Radio Omroep Stichting (TROS)
- Country: Netherlands
- Selection process: Artist: Nationaal Songfestival 2010; Song: Internal selection
- Selection date: Artist: 7 February 2010; Song: 18 December 2009

Competing entry
- Song: "Ik ben verliefd (Sha-la-lie)"
- Artist: Sieneke
- Songwriters: Pierre Kartner

Placement
- Semi-final result: Failed to qualify (14th)

Participation chronology

The Netherlands was represented at the Eurovision Song Contest 2010 with the song "Ik ben verliefd (Sha-la-lie)", written by Pierre Kartner, and performed by Sieneke. The Dutch participating broadcaster, Televisie Radio Omroep Stichting (TROS), internally selected its entry for the contest. "Ik ben verliefd (Sha-la-lie)" was presented to the public on 18 December 2009, while the national final Nationaal Songfestival 2010 was organised in order to select the performer. Five artists competed in the national final on 7 February 2010 where Sieneke was selected by Pierre Kartner as the winner following a tie between two of the artists based on the combination of votes from a four-member jury panel and an audience vote.

The Netherlands was drawn to compete in the second semi-final of the Eurovision Song Contest which took place on 27 May 2010. Performing during the show in position 9, "Ik ben verliefd (Sha-la-lie)" was not announced among top 10 entries of the second semi-final and therefore did not qualify to compete in the final. It was later revealed that the Netherlands placed fourteenth out of the 17 participating countries in the semi-final with 29 points.

== Background ==
Prior to the 2010 contest, Televisie Radio Omroep Stichting (TROS) and its predecessor national broadcasters have participated in the Eurovision Song Contest representing the Netherlands fifty times since NTS début in 1956. They have won the contest four times: in 1957 with the song "Net als toen" performed by Corry Brokken; in 1959 with the song "'n Beetje" performed by Teddy Scholten; in 1969 as one of four countries to tie for first place with "De troubadour" performed by Lenny Kuhr; and finally in 1975 with "Ding-a-dong" performed by the group Teach-In. Following the introduction of semi-finals for the 2004 contest, the Netherlands had featured in only one final. The Dutch least successful result has been last place, which they have achieved on four occasions, most recently in 1968. The Netherlands has also received nul points on two occasions; in 1962 and in 1963.

As part of its duties as participating broadcaster, TROS organises the selection of its entry in the Eurovision Song Contest and broadcasts the event in the country. TROS replaced Nederlandse Omroep Stichting (NOS) in these duties in 2010. The Dutch broadcaster has used various methods to select its entry in the past, such as the Nationaal Songfestival, a live televised national final to choose the performer, song or both to compete at Eurovision. However, internal selections have also been held on occasion. In 2009, NOS has internally selected the performer, while Nationaal Songfestival was organised in order to select the song. For 2010, Nationaal Songfestival was continued to select the artist, while the song was selected through an internal selection beforehand. In November 2009, a poll involving 500 people conducted by Dutch private broadcaster RTL 4 revealed that 86% of those would agree to a possible withdrawal due to the poor results received in past contests.

== Before Eurovision ==
=== Nationaal Songfestival 2010 ===
The logo of Nationaal Songfestival 2010

On 28 November 2009, TROS announced that they had selected Pierre Kartner to compose the Dutch song for the Eurovision Song Contest 2010. A demo version of the song, "Ik ben verliefd (Sha-la-lie)", premiered on 18 December during the Radio 2 programme Gouden Uren, hosted by Daniël Dekker. The five competing artists that would perform the song in the national final Nationaal Songfestival 2010 were announced during a press conference on 22 January 2010. The selection of the artists for the competition occurred through coaches consisting of well-known Dutch singers: Loekz by Frans Bauer, Marlous Oosting by Corry Konings, Peggy Mays by Albert West, Sieneke by Marianne Weber and Vinzzent by Grad Damen.

The final took place on 7 February 2010 at the Studio Baarn in Utrecht, hosted by Yolanthe Sneijder-Cabau and was broadcast on Nederland 1 as well as streamed online via the broadcaster's Eurovision Song Contest website songfestival.nl. All five competing artists performed "Ik ben verliefd (Sha-la-lie)" in different styles and the winning artist, Sieneke, was selected by the combination of votes from a four-member jury (4/5) and the audience in the studio (1/5). The jury panel consisted of radio DJ Daniël Dekker, singer and actress Tatjana Šimić, singer George Baker and Irish 1980 and 1987 Eurovision winner Johnny Logan. Each juror had an equal stake in the final result while the audience vote had a weighting equal to the votes of a single juror. Sieneke and Loekz were tied at 2 votes each, and the tie was resolved after Sieneke was selected by Pierre Kartner himself as the winner. In addition to the performances of the artists, the show featured Johnny Logan performing his Eurovision 1987 winning song "Hold Me Now". The national final was watched by 2.053 million viewers in the Netherlands with a market share of 29.6%.

After the voting led to a tie between Sieneke and Loekz, Pierre Kartner was called on stage to break the tie but continuously resisted to do so as he considered both artists "equally strong". Being pushed by the show producers and presenter Yolanthe Sneijder-Cabau to make a decision, he first attempted to vote by flipping a coin but ultimately chose Sieneke after discovering that it was against the rules.

Final – 7 February 2010
R/O	Artist	Jury votes				Studio Audience	Total	Place
R/O	Artist	D. Dekker	T. Šimić	J. Logan	G. Baker	Studio Audience	Total	Place
1	Sieneke	X			X		2	1
2	Vinzzent					X	1	3
3	Loekz		X	X			2	2
4	Peggy Mays						0	4
5	Marlous Oosting						0	4

=== Criticism and plagiarism allegations ===
Criticism was voiced by Pierre Kartner's role in the Dutch selection, amongst them Eric van Tijn who has written two past Dutch Eurovision entries. He voiced his opinion that "Kartner has written some fantastic songs in the past, but that's way too long ago, if you ask me." Past Dutch Eurovision entrants were among those invited by TROS to become coaches but many refused: Edsilia Rombley (1998 and 2007) stated that she "did not like the idea", while Lenny Kuhr (1969) called the selected song "shabby" and "an insult to the [Dutch] public". For some time there was also uncertainty about Corry Konings' role as coach due to disagreements about the production of Marlous Oosting's version of the song. Marlous remained in the competition after the dispute was settled.

Following the presentation of "Ik ben verliefd (Sha-la-lie)", an enormous majority of Dutch press and Eurovision fans had no high hopes for the song at the contest, claiming it to be "too old-fashioned" and blaming TROS for choosing Kartner to compose the song. 2009 Dutch Eurovision entrant (as part of De Toppers) Gordon, who initially agreed to be a coach selecting the winner of the Dutch show Waar is Elvis?! Bouke as the artist, withdrew from the competition after hearing the song. Criticism was also received from jury member Johnny Logan who stated following Nationaal Songfestival 2010 that the song "just isn't strong enough" with "no appeal at all to European voters". However, an incentive was launched by regional Dutch radio stations in support of the Dutch entry, with every station playing the song simultaneously on 18 February at 11:15 CET. The initiative was also supported by 1987 Dutch Eurovision entrant Marga Bult. The following week, "Ik ben verliefd (Sha-la-lie)" went to top the Dutch Single Top 100, becoming the first Dutch Eurovision song ever to achieve this in the Netherlands. The song also topped the Dutch iTunes download chart.

In addition to the criticism, Pierre Kartner was accused of plagiarism by musician Dick van Altena who claimed that the former had stolen the melody and complete tune of his song "Angelien", which he wrote for singer Arne Jansen in 1994. Van Altena filed a complaint with Buma/Stemra on 20 April and the verdict was due on 23 June, which could have led to the disqualification of Sieneke's Eurovision participation. The complaint was withdrawn on 6 May after a suitable settlement, although van Altena stated that the whole matter could have been handled more clearly. Prior to the national final, one of the verses of "Ik ben verliefd (Sha-la-lie)" had been edited due to a "political reference" to the Russian city of Saint Petersburg (the USSR-era name Leningrad was used instead).

== At Eurovision ==
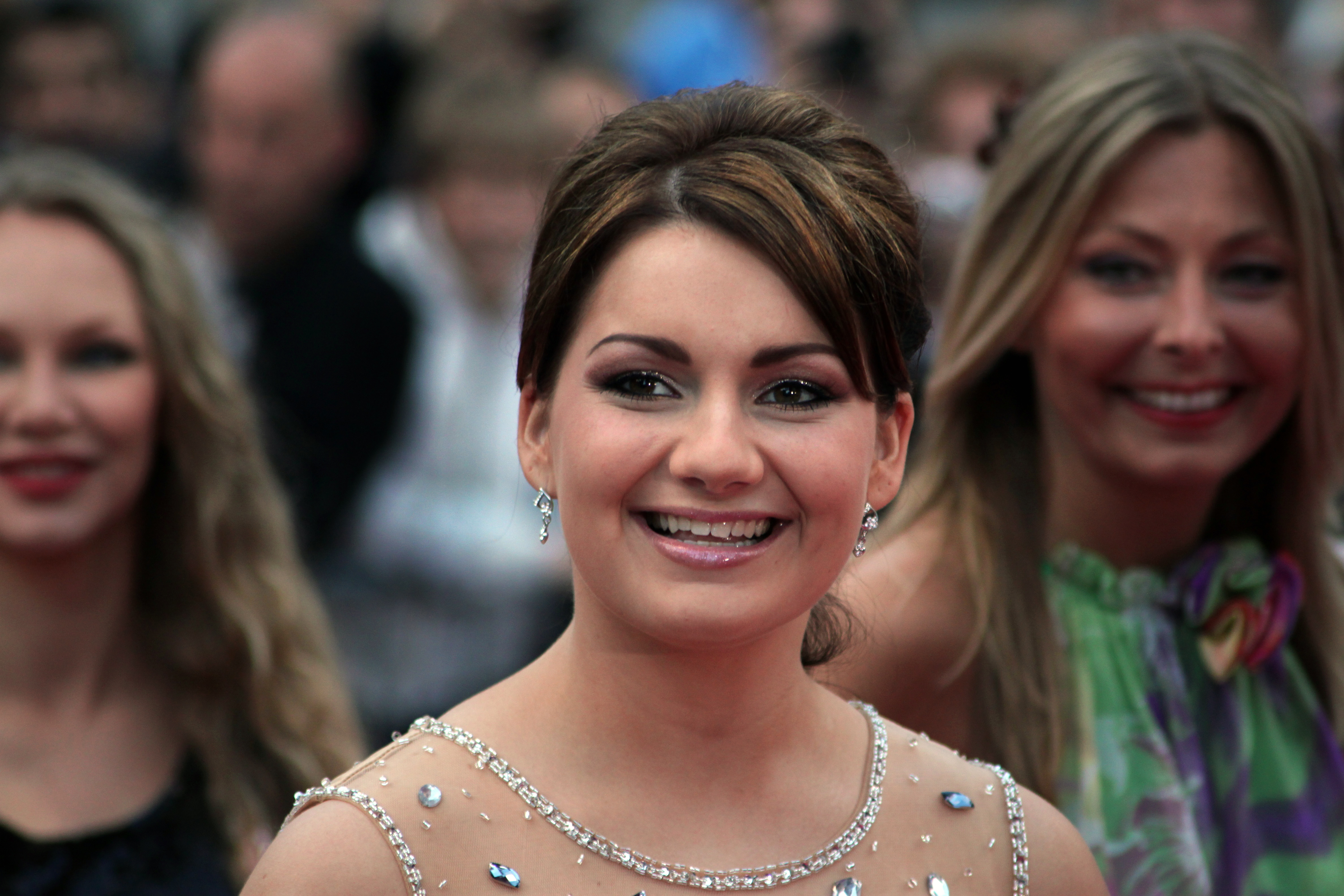
Sieneke at the Eurovision Opening Party in Oslo

According to Eurovision rules, all nations with the exceptions of the host country and the "Big Four" (France, Germany, Spain and the United Kingdom) were required to qualify from one of two semi-finals in order to compete for the final; the top ten countries from each semi-final progress to the final. The European Broadcasting Union (EBU) split up the competing countries into six different pots based on voting patterns from previous contests, with countries with favourable voting histories put into the same pot. On 7 February 2010, a special allocation draw was held which placed each country into one of the two semi-finals, as well as which half of the show they would perform in. The Netherlands was placed into the second semi-final, to be held on 27 May 2010, and was scheduled to perform in the second half of the show. The running order for the semi-finals was decided through another draw on 23 March 2010 and the Netherlands was set to perform in position 9, following the entry from Ukraine and before the entry from Romania.

The two semi-finals and the final was broadcast in the Netherlands on Nederland 1 with commentary by Cornald Maas and Daniël Dekker. The Dutch spokesperson, who announced the Dutch votes during the final, was Yolanthe Sneijder-Cabau.

=== Semi-final ===
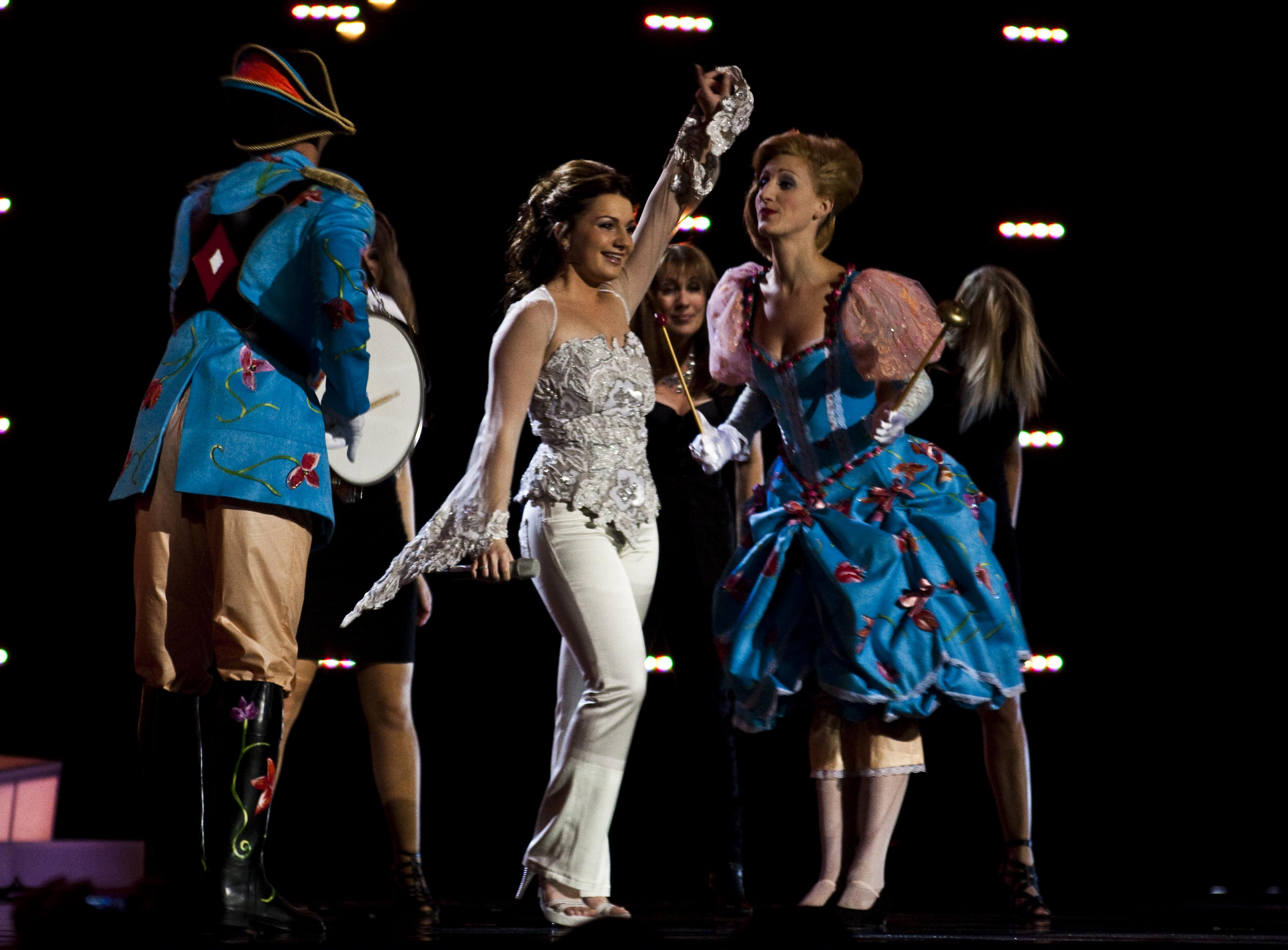
Sieneke during a rehearsal before the second semi-final

Sieneke took part in technical rehearsals on 19 and 22 May, followed by dress rehearsals on 26 and 27 May. This included the jury show on 26 May where the professional juries of each country watched and voted on the competing entries.

The Dutch performance featured Sieneke wearing white trousers and a white blouse and performing in front of a large street organ with LED screens together with two mime performers dressed as dolls and three backing vocalists. The organ displayed hearts, sun rays and parts of the lyrics from the song, while the stage was colourfully lighted. The two mime performers that joined Sieneke were Peter van der Poort and Floor van der Poort, while the three backing vocalists were Kelly ter Horst, Yvette Keijzers and Wiesje Westerlaken.

At the end of the show, the Netherlands was not announced among the top 10 entries in the second semi-final and therefore failed to qualify to compete in the final. It was later revealed that the Netherlands placed fourteenth in the semi-final, receiving a total of 29 points.

=== Voting ===
Voting during the three shows consisted of 50 percent public televoting and 50 percent from a jury deliberation. The jury consisted of five music industry professionals who were citizens of the country they represent. This jury was asked to judge each contestant based on: vocal capacity; the stage performance; the song's composition and originality; and the overall impression by the act. In addition, no member of a national jury could be related in any way to any of the competing acts in such a way that they cannot vote impartially and independently.

Following the release of the full split voting by the EBU after the conclusion of the competition, it was revealed that the Netherlands had placed eleventh with the public televote and fourteenth with the jury vote in the second semi-final. In the public vote, the Netherlands scored 49 points, while with the jury vote, the Netherlands scored 26 points.

Below is a breakdown of points awarded to the Netherlands and awarded by the Netherlands in the second semi-final and grand final of the contest. The nation awarded its 12 points to Israel in the semi-final and to Armenia in the final of the contest.

==== Points awarded to the Netherlands ====
Points awarded to the Netherlands (Semi-final 2)
Score	Country
12 points	
10 points	
8 points	
7 points	
6 points	Slovenia
5 points	Turkey
4 points	Denmark; Israel
3 points	Ireland; Norway
2 points	Switzerland
1 point	Georgia; Sweden

==== Points awarded by the Netherlands ====
Points awarded by the Netherlands (Semi-final 2)
Score	Country
12 points	Israel
10 points	Armenia
8 points	Ireland
7 points	Turkey
6 points	Sweden
5 points	Georgia
4 points	Denmark
3 points	Romania
2 points	Ukraine
1 point	Azerbaijan

Points awarded by the Netherlands (Final)
Score	Country
12 points	Armenia
10 points	Israel
8 points	Turkey
7 points	Ukraine
6 points	Belgium
5 points	Romania
4 points	Germany
3 points	Greece
2 points	Denmark
1 point	Serbia
