= Cyprus in the Eurovision Song Contest 2010 =

- Eurovision Song Contest 2010
- Participating broadcaster: Cyprus Broadcasting Corporation (CyBC)
- Country: Cyprus
- Selection process: Eurovision 2010: Epilogi tis kypriakis symmetochis
- Selection date: 7 February 2010

Competing entry
- Song: "Life Looks Better in Spring"
- Artist: Jon Lilygreen and the Islanders
- Songwriters: Nasos Lambrianides; Melis Konstantinou

Placement
- Semi-final result: Qualified (10th, 67 points)
- Final result: 21st, 27 points

Participation chronology

Cyprus was represented at the Eurovision Song Contest 2010 with the song "Life Looks Better in Spring", written by Nasos Lambrianides and Melis Konstantinou, and performed by Jon Lilygreen and the Islanders. The Cypriot participating broadcaster, the Cyprus Broadcasting Corporation (CyBC), organised the national final Eurovision 2010: Epilogi tis kypriakis symmetochis to select its entry for the contest. The national final featured nine entries, resulting in the selection of Lilygreen and the Islanders with "Life Looks Better in Spring" at the final in February 2010.

Cyprus was drawn to compete in the second semi-final of the Eurovision Song Contest which took place on 27 May 2010. Performing during the show in position 14, "Life Looks Better in Spring" was announced among the top 10 entries of the second semi-final and therefore qualified to compete in the final on 29 May. It was later revealed that Cyprus placed 10th out of the 17 participating countries in the semi-final with 67 points. In the final, Cyprus performed in position 5 and placed 21st out of the 25 participating countries, scoring 27 points.

== Background ==
Prior to the 2010 contest, the Cyprus Broadcasting Corporation (CyBC) had participated in the Eurovision Song Contest representing Cyprus twenty-seven times since its debut in 1981. Its best placing was fifth, achieved three times: in 1982 with the song "Mono i agapi" performed by Anna Vissi, in 1997 with "Mana mou" performed by Hara and Andreas Constantinou, and in 2004 with "Stronger Every Minute" performed by Lisa Andreas. Its least successful result was in 1986 when it placed last with the song "Tora zo" by Elpida, receiving only four points in total. Its worst finish in terms of points received, however, was in 1999 when it placed second to last with "Tha'nai erotas" by Marlain Angelidou, receiving only two points. In 2009, "Firefly" performed by Christina Metaxa failed to qualify for the final.

As part of its duties as participating broadcaster, CyBC organises the selection of its entry in the Eurovision Song Contest and broadcasts the event in the country. The broadcaster confirmed its intentions to participate in the 2010 contest on 6 October 2009. CyBC has used various methods to select its entry in the past, such as internal selections and televised national finals to choose the performer, song or both. Since 2008, the broadcaster has organised a national final to select its entry, a method which was continued for 2010.

== Before Eurovision ==
=== Eurovision 2010: Epilogi tis kypriakis symmetochis ===
Eurovision 2010: Epilogi tis kypriakis symmetochis (Greek: Επιλογή της κυπριακης συμμετοχης; "Selection of the Cypriot participation") was the national final format developed by CyBC to select Cyprus' entry for the Eurovision Song Contest 2010. The competition took place on 7 February 2010 at the CyBC Studio 3 in Nicosia, hosted by Andreas Georgiou and broadcast on RIK 1, RIK Sat and in Greece on ET1 as well as online via CyBC's website cybc.cy.

==== Competing entries ====
Artists and composers were able to submit their entries to the broadcaster until 27 November 2009. All artists and songwriters were required to have Cypriot nationality, origin, or residency, or be European citizens who had spent at least two years residing in Cyprus. Additionally, no portion of the submitted song or lyrics thereof was allowed to be previously released. At the conclusion of the deadline, 70 entries were received by CyBC. A seven-member selection committee which included three CyBC representatives shortlisted 20 entries from the received submissions and the 10 selected entries were announced on 12 December 2009. Among the competing artists were 1996, 2002 and 2005 Cypriot Eurovision entrant Constantinos Christoforou and 2008 Bulgarian Eurovision entrant Deep Zone. Mike Connaris composed the Cypriot Eurovision entry in 2004. On 29 January 2010, the song "Nothing Is Real" written by Nasos Lambrianides and Melis Konstantinou was withdrawn and replaced with "Waiting" performed by Andreas Economides. On 3 February 2010, "Play" performed by Deep Zone was disqualified from the competition as the song was released online before the broadcast of the national final.

==== Final ====
The final took place on 7 February 2010 at the CyBC Studio 3 in Nicosia. Nine entries competed and the winner, "Life Looks Better in Spring" performed by Jon Lilygreen and the Islanders, was selected by a 50/50 combination of votes from a five-member jury panel and a public televote. The entry received the maximum 12 points from both the televote and jury, a first for a Cypriot national final. "Life Looks Better in Spring" was composed by Nasos Lambrianides and Melis Konstantinou, with lyrics by Lambrianides. Lilygreen was the only participant in the final to not already be famous in Cyprus or Greece, hailing instead from Wales in the United Kingdom. In addition to the performances of the competing entries, the show featured a guest performance by Giorgos Papadopoulos.

R/O	Artist	Song	Songwriter(s)	Jury	Televote		Total	Place
R/O	Artist	Song	Songwriter(s)	Jury	Votes	Points	Total	Place
1	Constantinos Christoforou	"Angel"	Constantinos Christoforou, Zenon Zindilis	10	4,109	7	17	2
2	Evagoras Evagorou	"I'm Gonna Be"	Marios Melekis, Christos Filippou, Anthi Pashi	3	2,191	4	7	8
3	Jon Lilygreen and the Islanders	"Life Looks Better in Spring"	Nasos Lambrianides, Melis Konstantinou	12	8,358	12	24	1
4	Hovig Demirjian	"Goodbye"	Valeria Partali	5	6,203	10	15	3
5	Vivian Daglas	"Rhapsody"	Leanna Varnavidou, Helena Antoniou	2	1,070	2	4	9
6	Anthi Pashi	"You Gotta Go"	Anthi Pashi	8	3,746	5	13	5
7	Constantinos Kountouzis and Soul Throw	"Island of Love"	Constantinos Kountouzis	7	4,256	8	15	3
8	Andreas Economides	"Waiting"	Christodoulos Charalambides, Andreas Economides	6	2,008	3	9	7
9	Nicole Paparistodemou	"Like a Woman"	Mike Connaris, Matheson Bayley	4	4,008	6	10	6

=== Promotion ===
Lilygreen and the Islanders made several appearances across Europe to specifically promote "Life Looks Better in Spring" as the Cypriot Eurovision entry. On 12 March 2010, Jon Lilygreen and the Islanders performed "Life Looks Better in Spring" during the Greek Eurovision national final Ellinikós Telikós 2010. On 24 April, the musicians performed during the Eurovision in Concert event which was held at the Lexion venue in Zaanstad, Netherlands on 24 April and hosted by Cornald Maas and Marga Bult.

== At Eurovision ==
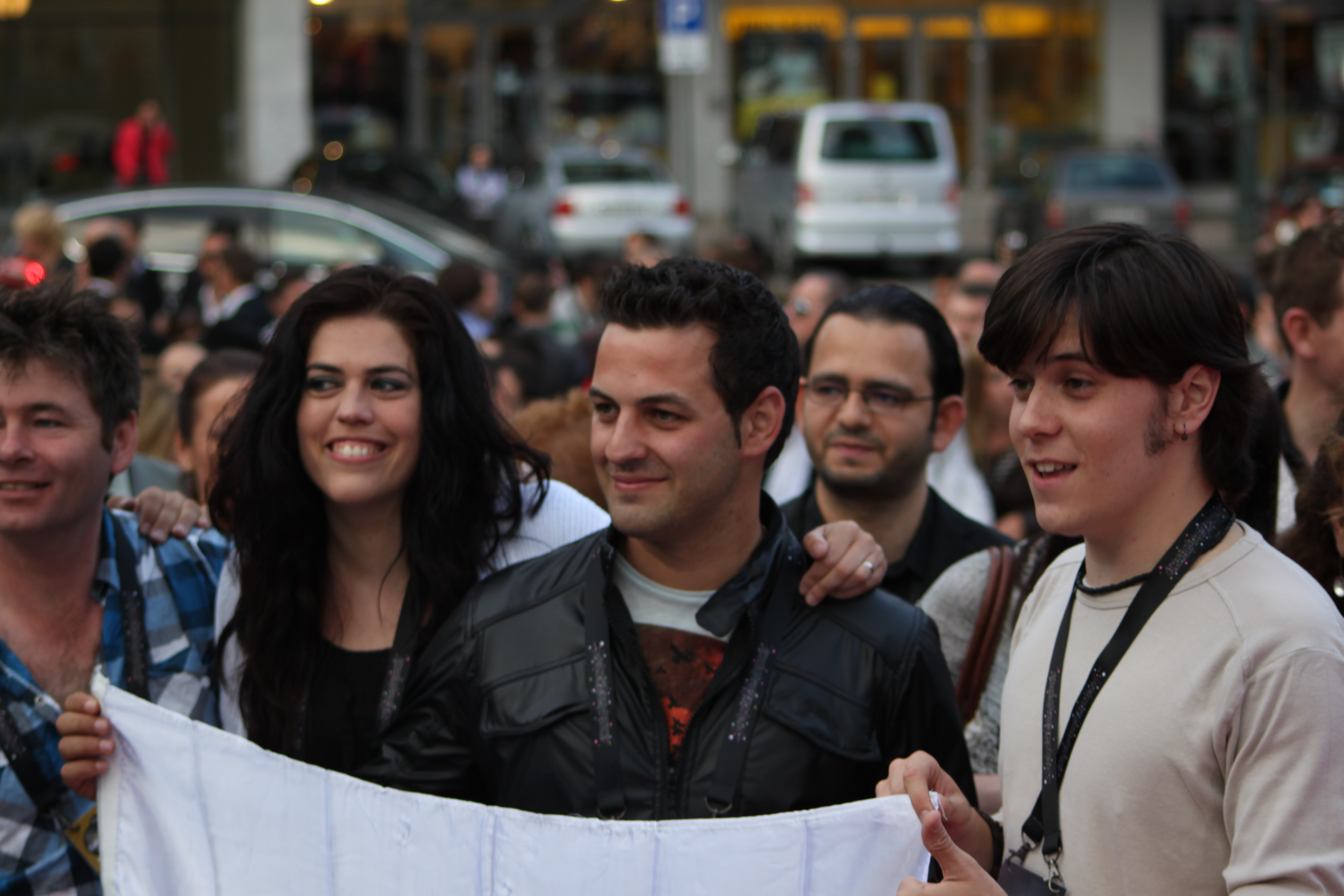
Jon Lilygreen and the Islanders at the Eurovision Opening Party in Oslo

The Eurovision Song Contest 2010 took place at Telenor Arena in Oslo, Norway, and consisted of two semi-finals held on 25 and 27 May, respectively, and the final on 29 May 2010. According to the contest's rules, all participating countries, except the host nation and the "Big Four", consisting of France, Germany, Spain and the United Kingdom, were required to qualify from one of the two semi-finals to compete for the final; the top 10 countries from the respective semi-finals progress to the final. The European Broadcasting Union (EBU) split up the competing countries into five different pots based on voting patterns from previous contests evaluated by Digame, in order to decrease the influence of neighbour and diaspora voting. An allocation draw was then held in Oslo on 7 February 2010, that placed each country into one of the two semi-finals and determined which half of the show they would perform in. Cyprus was placed into the second semi-final to be held on 27 May and was scheduled to perform in the second half of the show. The running order for the semi-finals was decided through another draw on 23 March 2010, and Cyprus was set to perform in position 14, following the entry from Bulgaria and preceding the entry from Croatia. The two semi-finals and the final were broadcast in Cyprus on RIK 1, RIK SAT and RIK Triton with commentary by Melina Karageorgiou as well as on RIK Deftero with English commentary by Nathan Morley.

=== Performances ===
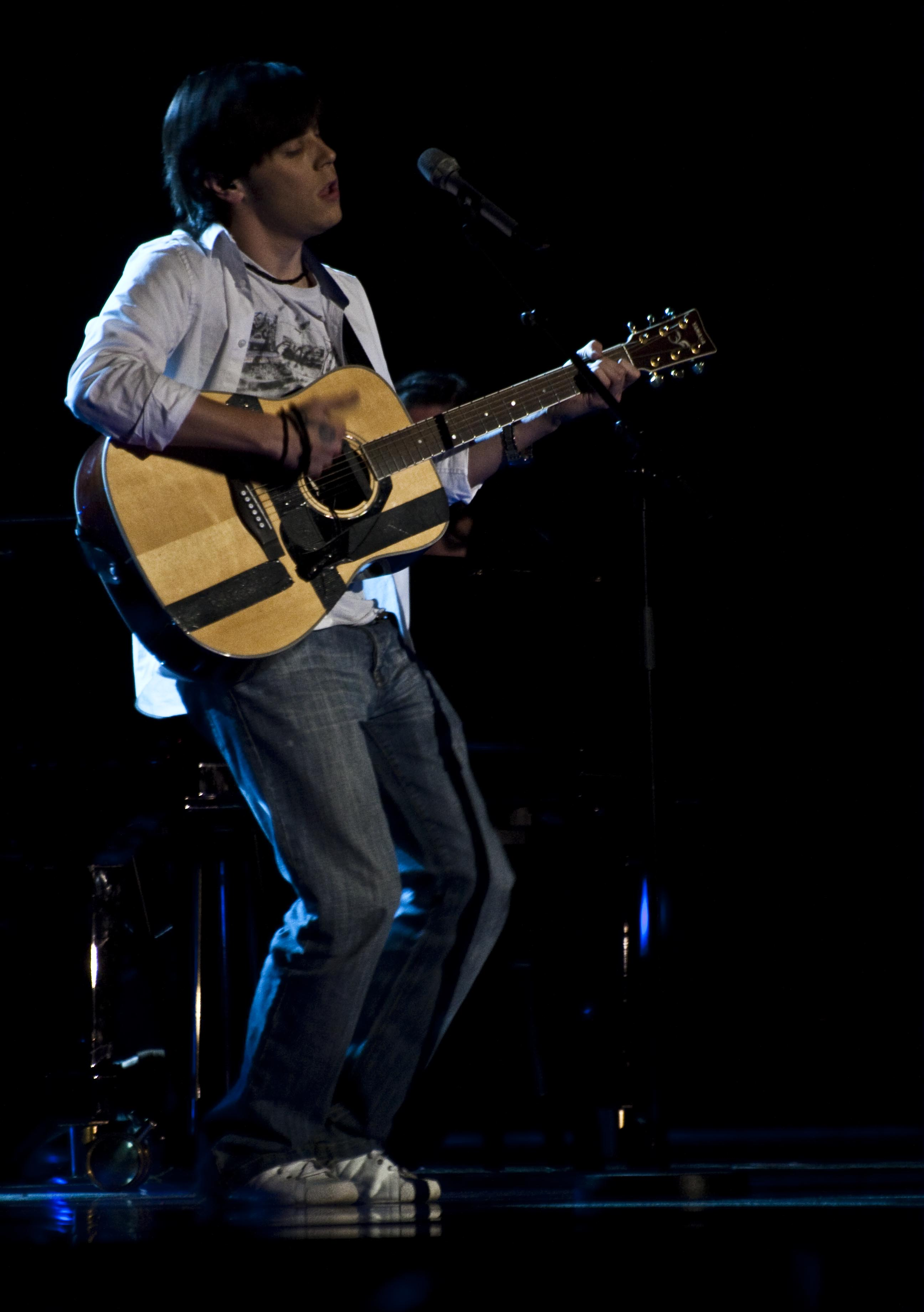
Lilygreen during a rehearsal before the second semi-final

Lilygreen and the Islanders took part in technical rehearsals on 19 and 23 May 2010, followed by a dress rehearsal on 26 May. At the 26 May rehearsal, the professional juries of each country watched and voted on the competing entries. The Cypriot performance featured Lilygreen dressed in a white jacket with blue jeans and trainers and playing the guitar, joined on stage by the members of the Islanders with their pianist Sylvia Strand performing backing vocals. The stage backdrop was dark with the lighting transitioning between blue, light brown, and orange colours.

At the end of the second semi-final, Cyprus was announced as having finished in the top 10, thereby qualifying for the final. The country placed 10th in the semi-final, receiving a total of 67 points. Shortly after the semi-final, a winners' press conference was held for the 10 qualifying countries. As part of this press conference, the qualifying artists took part in a draw to determine the running order for the final. This draw was done in the order the countries were announced during the semi-final. Cyprus was drawn to perform in position 5 for the final, following the entry from Moldova and preceding the entry from Bosnia and Herzegovina. Lilygreen and the Islanders once again took part in dress rehearsals on 28 and 29 May 2010 before the final, including the jury final where the professional juries cast their final votes before the live show. At the conclusion of the voting portion of the 29 May final, Cyprus was announced as having finished in 21st place with 27 points.

=== Voting ===
Voting during the three shows consisted of 50 percent public televoting and 50 percent from a jury deliberation. The jury consisted of five music industry professionals who were citizens of the country each represented. This jury was asked to judge each contestant based on: vocal capacity; the stage performance; the song's composition and originality; and the overall impression by the act. In addition, no member of a national jury could be related in any way to any of the competing acts in such a way that they cannot vote impartially and independently. Following the release of the full split voting by the EBU after the conclusion of the competition, it was revealed that Cyprus had placed 23rd with the public televote and 18th with the jury vote in the final. In the public vote, Cyprus scored 16 points, while with the jury vote, the nation scored 57 points. In the first semi-final, Cyprus placed tenth with the public televote with 53 points and ninth with the jury vote, scoring 79 points. Christina Metaxa, who represented Cyprus in 2009, was the Cypriot spokesperson who announced their votes during the final; the announcement was made from the new Larnaca International Airport. The nation awarded its 12 points to Armenia in the semi-final and to Greece in the final of the contest.

Below is a breakdown of points awarded to Cyprus and awarded by Cyprus in the second semi-final and final of the contest.

==== Points awarded to Cyprus ====
Points awarded to Cyprus (Semi-final 2)
Score	Country
12 points	Croatia
10 points	Israel
8 points	
7 points	Denmark
6 points	Armenia; Romania; Sweden
5 points	Bulgaria
4 points	Lithuania; Ukraine; United Kingdom
3 points	Azerbaijan
2 points	
1 point	

Points awarded to Cyprus (Final)
Score	Country
12 points	Greece
10 points	
8 points	
7 points	
6 points	
5 points	
4 points	Bulgaria; Croatia
3 points	Sweden
2 points	Slovakia
1 point	Denmark; Lithuania

==== Points awarded by Cyprus ====
Points awarded by Cyprus (Semi-final 2)
Score	Country
12 points	Armenia
10 points	Azerbaijan
8 points	Romania
7 points	Georgia
6 points	Ukraine
5 points	Bulgaria
4 points	Israel
3 points	Denmark
2 points	Lithuania
1 point	Sweden

Points awarded by Cyprus (Final)
Score	Country
12 points	Greece
10 points	Azerbaijan
8 points	Romania
7 points	Armenia
6 points	Ukraine
5 points	Georgia
4 points	Germany
3 points	France
2 points	Israel
1 point	Serbia
