= Miro (singer) =

Bulgarian singer and songwriter

Miroslav Kostadinov Мирослав Костадинов
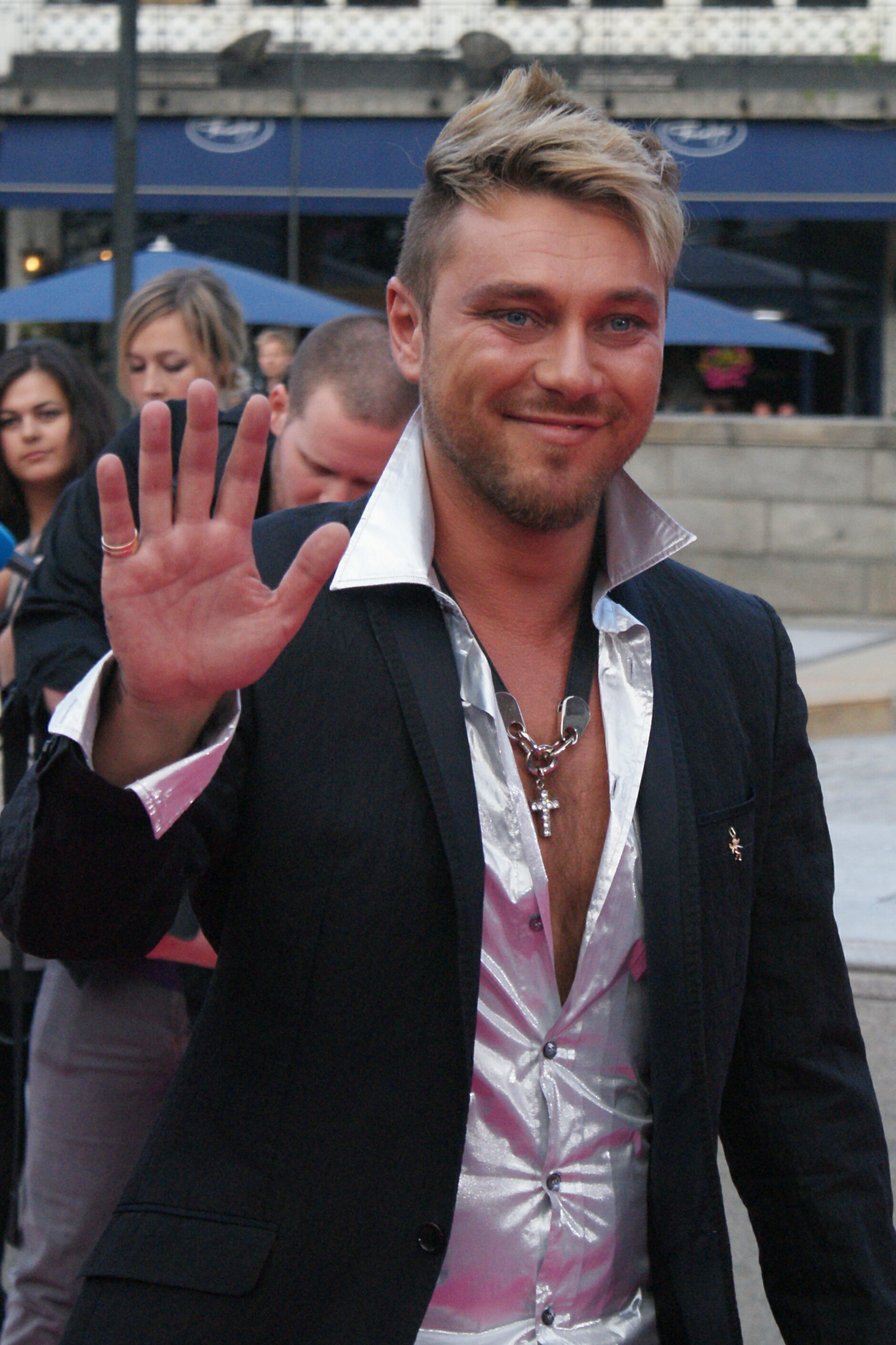

Background information
- Also known as: Miro
- Born: 10 March 1976 (age 50); Tolbukhin, People's Republic of Bulgaria
- Genres: Pop, Adult Contemporary, Soul, R&B, Dance Pop
- Occupations: Singer

Miroslav Kostadinov (Bulgarian: Мирослав Костадинов; born 10 March 1976) is a Bulgarian singer and songwriter who represented Bulgaria in the Eurovision Song Contest 2010 with the song "Angel si ti".

== Biography ==
Kostadinov was born in Dobrich, Bulgaria. He began playing the piano as a child. Years later, he joined an amateur singing group. After receiving awards from a number of festivals, he collaborated with some friends who were well-known musicians. Kostadinov has won two awards in Varna Discovery, and has also performed in Turkey and Kazakhstan. Later, he became part of the pop duo KariZma. In 2007, he recorded his first two songs as a solo musician, entitled "Ever Before" and "Lose Control", the latter being the first single on his debut solo record Omirotvoren.

== Eurovision Song Contest 2010 ==
For the Eurovision Song Contest in 2010, Bulgaria decided not to use the multi-heat selection system of previous years and select their artist internally. A panel of 51 music experts voted for a number of candidates; Kostadinov was the winner with ten votes, followed by Poli Genova with seven, and Nora in third place with three. Other artists in the running were Slavi Trifonov, Maria Ilieva, Lili Ivanova, Elitsa Todorova and Stoyan Yankoulov, the 2007 Bulgarian representatives.

At a national final, Kostadinov performed five songs written especially for him, in five different music genres ranging from ethno to rock. The winning song, selected by televote, was "Angel si ti". It was performed in the second semi-final on 27 May 2010, but did not progress to the final, finishing 15th out of 17 and scoring 19 points.

== Discography ==
=== Singles ===
Year	Title	Peak chart positions	Album
Year	Title	BUL	Album
2007	"Niakoga Predi (Еver Before)"	39	Omirotvoren
2008	"Radio On"	20	Omirotvoren
2008	"Nirvana (Miro and Mike Johnson)"	3	Omirotvoren
2009	"Gubya Kontrol, Kogato"	1	Omirotvoren
2009	"Avgust E Septemvri"	1	Omirotvoren
2009	"Ubivame S Lubov"	1	Omirotvoren
2010	"Omirotvoren"	16	Omirotvoren
2010	"Angel Si Ti"	1	Eurovision Single
2010	"POWER"	4	TBA

== Videography ==
=== KariZma ===
- Рискувам да те имам (Riskuvam da te imam)
- Колко ми липсваш (Kolko mi lipsvash)
- Ще избягам ли от теб? (Shte izbiagam li ot teb?)
- Mr.Killer
- Минаваш през мен (Minavash prez men)
- All in Love (Ne sega)

=== Solo career ===
- Някога преди (Niakoga predi)
- Завинаги (Zavinagi) feat. Anelia
- Nirvana feat. Mike Johnson (2-4 family)
- Губя контрол, когато (Gubia kontrol, kogato REMIX)
- В едно огледало (V edno ogledalo) feat. Krum
- Август е септември (Avgust e septemvri)
- Убиваме с любов (Ubivame s lubov)
- Ангел си ти (Angel si ti)
- Mil Amantes feat. Feminnem and Sir Jam
- POWER

== Personal life ==
Kostadinov married Elitza Zlatanova in 2016.

== Awards ==
- 2007 – Most Elegant Male
- 2008 – Fan TV award for Best Male Artist
- 2008 – Planeta TV award for Best Song ("Zavinagi" feat. Anelia)
- 2008 – Planeta TV award for Best Video ("Zavinagi" feat. Anelia)
- 2008 – BG Radio Music Awards – Best Lyrics ("Niakoga predi")
- 2008 – BG Radio Music Awards – Best Video ("Niakoga predi")
- 2008 – Nov folk Music Awards – Best Duet ("Zavinagi")
- 2008 – Romantika Radio – Best Song ("Zavinagi")
- 2008 – "Sing with me" reality show – 1st place (with Divna)
- 2009 – BG Radio Music Awards – Best Male Artist
- 2009 – BG Radio Music Awards – Best Song ("Gubia kontrol, kogato")
- 2009 – BG Radio Music Awards – Best Album ("Omirotvoren")
- 2009 – Mad Video Music Awards – Best Bulgarian Video ("Gubia kontrol, kogato REMIX")
- 2010 – BG Radio Music Awards – Best Male Artist
- 2010 – BG Radio Music Awards – Best Song ("Ubivame s lubov")
- 2010 – BG Radio Music Awards – Best Video ("Ubivame s lubov")

Awards and achievements
Preceded by Krassimir Avramov with "Illusion"	Bulgaria in the Eurovision Song Contest; 2010	Succeeded by Poli Genova with "Na inat"
