= Farhad Hajiyev =

Azerbaijani politician

Farhad Hajiyev Fərhad Hacıyev

Deputy Minister of Youth and Sports of Azerbaijan Republic
- Incumbent
- Assumed office March 1, 2018

Executive Director of the Youth Foundation under the President of Azerbaijan Republic
- In office December 30, 2012 – March 1, 2018

Personal details
- Born: 1980 (age 45–46) Sumgait, Azerbaijan SSR, USSR
- Education: Azerbaijan University (1995–1999, 1999–2001); UNEC (2005–2007); Harvard Kennedy School (2008)
- Awards

Farhad Majid oghlu Hajiyev (Azerbaijani: Fərhad Məcid oğlu Hacıyev, 1980, Sumgait) is the deputy minister of youth and sports of Azerbaijan Republic.

== Biography ==
Hajiyev was born in 1980 in Sumgait. He completed a bachelor's degree in international relations at Azerbaijan University between 1995 and 1999, and completed a master's degree between 1999 and 2001. In 2007 he graduated from Azerbaijan State University of Economics with a master's degree in finance. He graduated from the course of Harvard Kennedy School for senior government officials in 2008. He is a PhD in philosophical sciences.

== Career ==
In 2000–2001 Hajiyev worked as a department head, chairman of the assembly, secretary general of the National Council of Youth Organizations of Azerbaijan Republic. In 2001, he was appointed head of the Sector for Work with International Organizations at Ministry of Youth and Sports of the Republic of Azerbaijan. In November 2002, he was appointed head of the Youth Affairs Department of the Ministry of Youth and Sports. From 2006 to 2009, he served as chairman of the Council of Europe's Youth Affairs Program Committee.

From 2012 to 2018 he worked as the executive director of the Youth Foundation under the president of the Republic of Azerbaijan. In 2018, he was appointed deputy minister of youth and sports of the Republic of Azerbaijan by the order of the president of the Republic of Azerbaijan.

== Awards ==
- For service to the Fatherland Order (3rd degree) – July 24, 2019
- Medal "For Distinction in Civil Service" – February 8, 2011
- Honorary Diploma of President – June 29, 2015
