= Katerine Avgoustakis =

Greek-Belgian singer

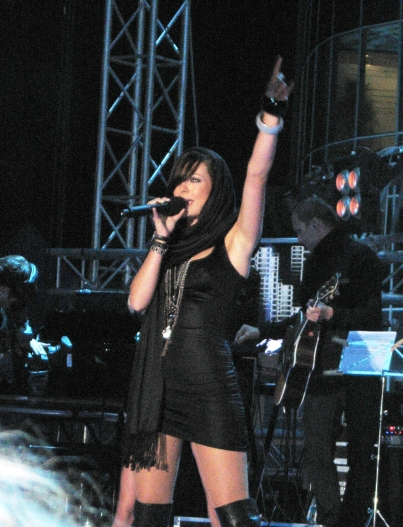

Background information
- Born: 16 September 1983 (age 42); Maasmechelen, Belgium
- Genres: Pop, dance
- Years active: 2002–present
- Labels: Universal Music Belgium, Mostiko
- Website: Official website

Katerine Avgoustakis (Greek: Κατερίνα Αυγουστάκη; born 16 September 1983) is a Greek-Belgian singer. She was the winner of the 2005 Star Academy show.

== Early life ==
Avgoustakis was born in Maasmechelen, Belgium to a Greek father and a Flemish mother, who died in 2005, at 54 years old, after a long struggle with liver cancer. She plays the piano and used to be in a choir.

== Career ==
=== 2002–2006: Indiana, Star Academy and Katerine ===
Avgoustakis made her singing debut as a member of the band Indiana in 2002, with whom she participated in the national final to represent Belgium in the Eurovision Song Contest 2002 with the song "Imitation Love". Indiana failed to make it through the selection's semi-final round.

After leaving Indiana, she entered Star Academy in Flanders in 2005. She won the contest and a record contract with Universal Music Belgium. Avgoustakis's debut single "New Day", released in July 2005 in Belgium, peaked at #2 in the Belgian UltraTop 50 chart. "New Day" was written and produced by Regi Penxten & Filip Vandueren, the team behind Milk Inc. Three months later, she received the TMF Flanders award for Best New National Artist for the song. Also the song was certified gold in Belgium. Her self-named debut album, Katerine, was released on 14 November 2005 in Belgium. The album is to be released in May in the Netherlands. Due to the death of her mother, her second single, Here Come All the Boys, was delayed to be released in October 2005. This is the first single she also released in the Netherlands, that peaked at #89 in the Dutch Mega Singles Top 100. The song is also featured on the hits compilation HitBox, which was released on 13 March 2006, containing hits like Ricky Martin's "I Don't Care", Rihanna's "If It's Lovin' That You Want" and the Michael Jackson cover "Say Say Say (Waiting 4 U)" by Hi_Tack. In 2006, Avgoustakis was nominated for 3 TMF Awards: Best pop music national, best female artist national and best music video national. She won best pop music and best female artist, the award best musicvideo national was going to Nailpin, a Belgium rock band.

Avgoustakis also won the first Belgian pre-selection for Eurosong 2006 on 8 January 2006 with the song "Watch Me Move".

The third single from her album Katerine, "Take Me Home", was released on 4 April 2006 in Belgium, with "Watch Me Move" as B-side. The next single "Catfight" was a quick follow-up and both "Take Me Home" and "Catfight" had very strong videos.

=== 2007–present: New album and label ===
In 2007, Avgoustakis was asked for the Belgian TV program Sterren op het Ijs (a Belgian version of Stars on Ice), an opportunity she accepted. She even made it to the final, but came in second. Dean Delannoit, was the winner of Idool 2007 that year.

In May 2007, she released "Live Wire", the first single from her upcoming second album and the song's music video was her first 'computer-animated' video. A couple of months later she released "Don't Put It on Me" and then she and her Record Label reached a 'hiatus' and wanted to go in different directions which they did. Avgoustakis soon agreed to a new recording contract with Mostiko, which led to the single "Shut Your Mouth", with music different from her normal sounds. The single fared well in the charts charting in its first week at number three in the 'Ultratop 50'. In the following months, she released three more singles: "He's Not Like You", "Upon The Catwalk" (soundtrack from a Belgium TV channel '2BE' "Topmodel") and "Ultrasonic" (Ultrasonic made it in the Canada Dance Charts on the 2nd place). All songs from her new album OVERDRIVE, which were presented on 6 December 2008 at Versuz discothèque in Hasselt.

Avgoustakis and Mostiko have been approached by several international labels that showed interest in her new album for which negotiations are in progress to release internationally. Avgoustakis said in an interview that an international career "would be fabulous" and that she is "... negotiating with [...] contact persons in Greece and [that] there have been releases in Spain, South Africa and Poland. [They] also got positive reactions from the Scandinavian countries, Russia and Japan".

In an interview, Avgoustakis stated that she would have liked to represent Greece at the 2010 Eurovision Song Contest. As she is not very well known in Greece, the fact that she was set to submit lyrics for one of Sakis Rouvas's national final songs for the Eurovision Song Contest 2009 introduced her name and talents.

In March 2009, for her record company, she sang "Ayo Technology" for a children's CD, but the song was picked up by radio stations in Poland. Not much later, the song was in the Polish top 5 and Avgoustakis had her first international hit and also first number-one single.

On 8 August 2009 in Sopot, with the track "Ayo Technology", she won the contest for the International Hit Summer Sopot Hit Festiwal.

In 2010, Avgoustakis performed a duet "Toi + Moi" with French artist Grégoire at the Mad awards show, singing in a Greek and French.

== Personal life ==
Currently, Avgoustakis lives in Maasmechelen. Avgoustakis used to be a beauty specialist and before that a saleswoman.

== Discography ==
=== Albums ===
Year	Information	Chart positions	
Year	Information	BE	PL
2005	Katerine: Debut studio album; Released: 18 November 2005	9	—
2008	Overdrive: Second studio album; Released: 1 December 2008	82	67
2012	The Real Me: Third studio album (acoustic); Released: 31 December 2012	—	—

=== Singles ===
- All regularly released singles and their chart peak positions in Belgium (BEL) – UltraTop 50, Netherlands (NED) – GfK Single Top 100 and Poland (POL) – Nielsen Music Control Top 100 Bulgaria (BUL) – Nielsen Music Control Airplay Chart Russia (RUS) – Russian Top 100 Airplay Chart and Turkey (TUR) – Number One Chart Top 100

Year	Title	Album	Chart positions					
Year	Title	Album	BEL	NED	POL	BUL	RUS	TUR
2005	"New Day"	Katerine	2	-	-	-	-	-
2005	"Here Come All The Boys"	Katerine	5	89	-	-	-	-
2006	"Take Me Home/Watch Me Move"	Katerine	15	-	-	-	-	-
2006	"Catfight"	Katerine	32	-	-	-	-	-
2007	"Live Wire"	Overdrive	27	-	-	-	-	
2007	"Don't Put It on Me"	Overdrive	tip4	-	-	-	-	-
2008	"Shut Your Mouth"	Overdrive	3	-	-	-	-	-
2008	"He's Not Like You"	Overdrive	34	-	-	-	-	-
2008	"Ultrasonic"	Overdrive	20	-	-	-	-	-
2008	"Upon The Catwalk"	Overdrive	38	-	-	-	-	-
2009	"Ayo Technology"	Overdrive (Re-Release)	-	-	1	8	54	12
2009	"Treat Me Like A Lady"	Overdrive	26	-	4	-	-	57
2010	"Enjoy The Day"	TBA	26	-	21	-	-	1
2010	"Merry Xmas"	TBA	tip33	-	-	-	-	-
Top 10 hits			3	0	2	1	0	1
