= Macedonia in the Eurovision Song Contest 2010 =

- Eurovision Song Contest 2010
- Participating broadcaster: Macedonian Radio Television (MRT)
- Country: Macedonia
- Selection process: Skopje Fest 2010
- Selection date: 20 February 2010

Competing entry
- Song: "Jas ja imam silata"
- Artist: Gjoko Taneski
- Songwriters: Kristijan Gabrovski

Placement
- Semi-final result: Failed to qualify (15th)

Participation chronology

Macedonia (Note: Officially under the provisional appellation "former Yugoslav Republic of Macedonia", abbreviated "FYR Macedonia".) was represented at the Eurovision Song Contest 2010 with the song "Jas ja imam silata" written by Kristijan Gabroski, and performed by Gjoko Taneski featuring Billy Zver and Pejčin. The Macedonian participating broadcaster, Macedonian Radio Television (MRT), organised Skopje Fest 2010 in order to select its entry for the contest. 28 entries competed in the competition which consisted of three shows: two semi-finals and a final. Fourteen songs competed in each semi-final and the top eight from each semi-final qualified to the final. In the final, "Jas ja imam silata" performed by Gjoko Taneski was selected following the combination of votes from a six-member jury panel and a public televote.

Macedonia was drawn to compete in the first semi-final of the Eurovision Song Contest which took place on 25 May 2010. Performing during the show in position 11, "Jas ja imam silata" was not announced among the top 10 entries of the first semi-final and therefore did not qualify to compete in the final. It was later revealed that Macedonia placed fifteenth out of the 17 participating countries in the semi-final with 37 points.

== Background ==
Prior to the 2010 contest, Macedonian Radio Television (MRT) had participated in the Eurovision Song Contest representing Macedonia nine times since its first entry in 1998. Its best result in the contest to this point was twelfth, achieved in 2006 with the song "Ninanajna" performed by Elena Risteska. Following the introduction of semi-finals for the 2004, Macedonia had featured in only four finals.

As part of its duties as participating broadcaster, MRT organises the selection of its entry in the Eurovision Song Contest and broadcasts the event in the country. The broadcaster had previously selected their entry for the contest through both national finals and internal selections. MRT confirmed its intentions to participate at the 2010 contest on 31 October 2009. Since 2008, it selected its entries using the national final Skopje Fest but failed to qualify to the final on every occasion. For 2011, the broadcaster again opted to select its entry through Skopje Fest.

== Before Eurovision ==
=== Skopje Fest 2010 ===
Skopje Fest 2010 was a song contest organised by MRT that served as Macedonia's national final to select its entry for the Eurovision Song Contest 2010. Twenty-eight entries participated in the competition which consisted of two semi-finals on 18 and 19 February 2010 leading to a sixteen-song final on 20 February 2010. All three shows took place at the Universal Hall in Skopje, hosted by Aleksandra Jovanovska and Sanja Arsovska and were broadcast on MTV 1, MTV Sat and Macedonian Radio. The final was also broadcast online via the official Eurovision Song Contest website eurovision.tv.

==== Format ====
The format of the competition included two semi-finals on 18 and 19 February 2010 and a final on 20 February 2010. Fourteen songs competed in each semi-final and the top eight from each semi-final qualified to complete the sixteen song lineup in the final. The results of the semi-finals and the final were determined by the 50/50 combination of votes from an expert jury panel and public televoting. The public could vote through telephone and SMS; the SMS voting was also open in Australia, Canada, Germany, Sweden, Switzerland and Turkey.

==== Competing entries ====
A submission period was opened for interested artists and composers to submit their entries between 10 November 2010 and 20 December 2010. MRT received 126 submissions at the closing of the deadline and twenty-eight entries were selected by a seven-member committee consisting of Gordana Andrashevska (MTV), Ljupčo Mirkovski (artistic director of Skopje Fest), Meri Popova (MTV), Radica Mitić (MR 2), Ariton Krliu (MR 2), Zoran Mirchevski (MR) and Alexandra Jovanovska (MTV). The twenty-eight competing songs were announced on 30 December 2009, while their artists were announced on 12 January 2010. Tumbao Salsa Band later replaced Verica Pandilovska as the performer of the song "Bravo", retitled as "Poludena vo nokjta studena".

Artist	Song	Songwriter(s)
Aleksandar Belov	"Ostani" (Остани)	Simon Trpčeski, Jovan Trpčeski
Angela Zdravkova	"Zaboravaš" (Забораваш)	Martin Vučić
Bojan Aleksovski	"Beli konji" (Бели коњи)	Anna Mojsovska, Ognen Nedelkovski
Bravo Band	"Taa ima se" (Таа има се)	Martin Vučić, Sanja Aleksov
Daniel Stojmanovski	"Akcija reakcija" (Акција реакција)	Aleksandar Masevski
Darko Ilievski	"Lagi" (Лаги)	Lazar Cvetkoski, Magdalena Cvetkoska
Dimitar Andonovski	"Kameno srce" (Камено срце)	Rade Vrčakovski
Duo Slide	"Mrazam" (Мразам)	Goran Micov
Esma's Band	"Džipsi dens" (Џипси денс)	Simeon Atanasov, Borče Nečovski
Gjoko Taneski	"Jas ja imam silata" (Јас ја имам силата)	Kristijan Gabroski
Gorjan Stojanovski	"Najmila" (Најмила)	Bertan Aslani
Igor Mitrović	"Malečka" (Малечка)	Boban Apostolov, Fani Hristova
Jova Radevska	"Seušte čekame" (Сеуште чекаме)	Jova Radevska
Kerber	"Čorbadžiјa" (Чорбаџија)	Dimče Kitrozoski, Kliment Srbinoski
Kristijan Jovanov	"Nikoj na ovoj svet" (Никој на овој свет)	Vanco Dimitrov, Jovan Jovanov
Maja Vukičević	"Fama" (Фама)	Aleksandar Masevski, Biljana Pasharikovska
Nade Talevska	"Srekjen kraj" (Среќен крај)	Grigor Koprov, Borče Dimitrov
Nataša Malinkova	"Sever i jug" (Север и југ)	Stole Avramov
Pampersi	"Sni" (Сни)	Daniel Mitrevski
Parketi	"Ti si kisi fenomen" (Ти си киси феномен)	Sašo Parket
Suzana Spasovska and Darko Nešovski	"Bog go ima sekoј ključ" (Бог го има секој кључ)	Sašo Livrinski, Ognen Nedelkovski
Teodora Trajkovska	"Letam" (Летам)	Valentino Skenderovski, Kristijan Gabroski
Treta Dimenzija	"Bolest zaraza" (Болест зараза)	Duško Temelkovski, Darko Risteski
Tumbao Salsa Band	"Poludena vo nokjta studena" (Полудена во ноќта студена)	Damir Imeri, Petar Rendžov
Viktorija Apostolova	"Zaboravi na se" (Заборави на се)	Zoran Aleksić
Vlatko Ilievski	"Srekja" (Среќа)	Vesna Malinova, Vladimir Dojčinovski, Risto Samardžiev
Vlatko Lozanoski	"Letam kon tebe" (Летам кон тебе)	Lazar Cvetkoski, Rade Vrčakovski
Vodolija	"Solza" (Солза)	Risto Apostolov

==== Semi-finals ====
The two semi-finals took place on 18 and 19 February 2010. Fourteen entries competed in each semi-final and top eight entries qualified to the final by a 50/50 combination of public televoting and a six-member jury panel. The jury panel that voted in the semi-finals consisted of Miki Crnokrak (fashion designer), Kiril Lozance (professor at the Faculty of Medicine), Vasko Todorov (K-15), Kiril Zarlinov (Antena 5), Gjorgji Cuckovski (MOB) and Gorazd Čapovski (musician). In addition to the performances of the competing entries, the first semi-final featured guest performances by 2007 Macedonian Junior Eurovision representative Rosica Kulakova and Dimitar Stojmenovski, 2009 Macedonian Junior Eurovision representative Sara Markoska and 2009 Macedonian Eurovision representative Next Time, while the second semi-final featured a guest performance by Synthesis.

Semi-final 1 – 18 February 2010
R/O	Artist	Song	Jury		Televote		Total	Place
R/O	Artist	Song	Votes	Points	Votes	Points	Total	Place
1	Duo Slide	"Mrazam"	3	0	162	5	5	9
2	Suzana Spasovska and Darko Nešovski	"Bog go ima sekoј ključ"	45	12	269	6	18	2
3	Kerber	"Čorbadžiјa"	12	0	108	0	0	12
4	Treta Dimenzija	"Bolest zaraza"	24	3	128	4	7	7
5	Tumbao Salsa Band	"Poludena vo nokjta studena"	28	6	35	0	6	8
6	Bravo Band	"Taa ima se"	22	2	500	10	12	5
7	Vlatko Ilievski	"Srekja"	44	10	1,157	12	22	1
8	Gorjan Stojanovski	"Najmila"	26	4	110	1	5	10
9	Aleksandar Belov	"Ostani"	30	7	312	8	15	3
10	Gjoko Taneski	"Jas ja imam silata"	40	8	297	7	15	4
11	Daniel Stojmanovski	"Akcija reakcija"	17	0	79	0	0	12
12	Darko Ilievski	"Lagi"	26	5	136	3	8	6
13	Nataša Malinkova	"Sever i jug"	21	1	119	2	3	11
14	Igor Mitrović	"Malečka"	10	0	36	0	0	12

Semi-final 2 – 19 February 2010
R/O	Artist	Song	Jury		Televote		Total	Place
R/O	Artist	Song	Votes	Points	Votes	Points	Total	Place
1	Pampersi	"Sni"	6	0	23	0	0	13
2	Vodolija	"Solza"	14	1	126	3	4	8
3	Nade Talevska	"Srekjen kraj"	29	6	515	8	14	4
4	Teodora Trajkovska	"Letam"	12	0	99	2	2	10
5	Bojan Aleksovski	"Beli konji"	16	2	34	0	2	11
6	Dimitar Andonovski	"Kameno srce"	20	3	63	0	3	9
7	Angela Zdravkova	"Zaboravaš"	23	4	231	6	10	7
8	Viktorija Apostolova	"Zaboravi na se"	43	8	190	5	13	5
9	Vlatko Lozanoski	"Letam kon tebe"	48	10	524	10	20	1
10	Jova Radevska	"Seušte čekame"	13	0	68	1	1	12
11	Esma's Band	"Džipsi dens"	37	7	1,410	12	19	2
12	Maja Vukičević	"Fama"	53	12	165	4	16	3
13	Kristijan Jovanov	"Nikoj na ovoj svet"	25	5	340	7	12	6
14	Parketi	"Ti si kisi fenomen"	9	0	54	0	0	13

==== Final ====
The final took place on 20 February 2010. Sixteen entries competed and a 50/50 combination of public televoting and a six-member jury panel selected "Jas ja imam silata" performed by Gjoko Taneski as the winner. The jury panel that voted in the final consisted of Avni Qahili (lyricist and showman), Naum Petreski (singer), Darko Gelev-Brejk (City Radio, Jungle TV), Sašo Gigov-Giš (poet and musician), Aleksandar Džambazov (composer) and Sasha Nikolovski-Gjumar (professor and conductor). Gjoko Taneski and Vlatko Ilievski were tied at 22 points each but since Gjoko Taneski received the most votes from the jury he was declared the winner. In addition to the performances of the competing entries, the competition featured guest performances by 2002 and 2007 Macedonian Eurovision representative Karolina Gočeva, 2010 Albanian Eurovision representative Juliana Pasha and 2010 Bosnian Eurovision representative Vukašin Brajić.

Final – 20 February 2010
R/O	Artist	Song	Jury		Televote		Total	Place
R/O	Artist	Song	Votes	Points	Votes	Points	Total	Place
1	Vodolija	"Solza"	12	0	86	0	0	14
2	Treta Dimenzija	"Bolest zaraza"	18	2	108	0	2	11
3	Tumbao Salsa Band	"Poludena vo nokjta studena"	14	1	27	0	1	12
4	Darko Ilievski	"Lagi"	5	0	190	0	0	14
5	Angela Zdravkova	"Zaboravaš"	30	6	146	0	6	8
6	Kristijan Jovanov	"Nikoj na ovoj svet"	9	0	432	1	1	12
7	Bravo Band	"Taa ima se"	29	5	2,030	4	9	6
8	Viktorija Apostolova	"Zaboravi na se"	11	0	78	0	0	14
9	Nade Talevska	"Srekjen kraj"	26	4	2,807	7	11	5
10	Aleksandar Belov	"Ostani"	0	0	4,011	8	8	7
11	Gjoko Taneski	"Jas ja imam silata"	51	12	5,605	10	22	1
12	Maja Vukičević	"Fama"	37	8	2,580	6	14	3
13	Suzana Spasovska and Darko Nešovski	"Bog go ima sekoј ključ"	20	3	670	2	5	9
14	Esma's Band	"Džipsi dens"	10	0	1,953	3	3	10
15	Vlatko Lozanoski	"Letam kon tebe"	33	7	2,314	5	12	4
16	Vlatko Ilievski	"Srekja"	43	10	7,877	12	22	2

=== Promotion ===
Gjoko Taneski specifically promoted "Jas ja imam silata" as the Macedonian Eurovision entry on 14 March by performing the song during the presentation show of the 2010 Bosnian Eurovision entry, BH Eurosong Show 2010.

== At Eurovision ==
According to Eurovision rules, all nations with the exceptions of the host country and the "Big Four" (France, Germany, Spain and the United Kingdom) are required to qualify from one of two semi-finals in order to compete for the final; the top ten countries from each semi-final progress to the final. The European Broadcasting Union (EBU) split up the competing countries into six different pots based on voting patterns from previous contests, with countries with favourable voting histories put into the same pot. On 7 February 2010, a special allocation draw was held which placed each country into one of the two semi-finals, as well as which half of the show they would perform in. Macedonia was placed into the first semi-final, to be held on 25 May 2010, and was scheduled to perform in the second half of the show. The running order for the semi-finals was decided through another draw on 23 March 2010 and Macedonia was set to perform in position 15, following the entry from Portugal and before the entry from Belarus.

The two semi-finals and final were broadcast in Macedonia on MTV 1 and MTV Sat with commentary by Karolina Petkovska. The Macedonian spokesperson, who announced the Macedonian votes during the final, was Maja Daniels.

=== Semi-final ===
Gjoko Taneski, Billy Zver and Pejčin took part in technical rehearsals on 17 and 21 May, followed by dress rehearsals on 24 and 25 May. This included the jury show on 9 May where the professional juries of each country watched and voted on the competing entries.

The Macedonian performance featured Gjoko Taneski performing in a black suit together with three dancers sitting on three silver boxes behind Taneski at the beginning. Billy Zver wore a silver suit with sunglasses and white trainers while Pejčin wore a white shirt with a scarf and black trousers; both performers joined Taneski later in the performance. The stage was dark with predominately green, red and white flashing spotlights. The three dancers that joined Gjoko Taneski, Billy Zver and Pejčin on stage were Deana Nikolovska, Jana Andrejević and Martina.

At the end of the show, Macedonia was not announced among the top 10 entries in the first semi-final and therefore failed to qualify to compete in the final. It was later revealed that Macedonia placed fifteenth in the semi-final, receiving a total of 37 points.

=== Voting ===
Voting during the three shows consisted of 50 percent public televoting and 50 percent from a jury deliberation. The jury consisted of five music industry professionals who were citizens of the country they represent. This jury was asked to judge each contestant based on: vocal capacity; the stage performance; the song's composition and originality; and the overall impression by the act. In addition, no member of a national jury could be related in any way to any of the competing acts in such a way that they cannot vote impartially and independently.

Following the release of the full split voting by the EBU after the conclusion of the competition, it was revealed that Macedonia had placed fifteenth with the public televote and tenth with the jury vote in the first semi-final. In the public vote, Macedonia scored 37 points, while with the jury vote, Macedonia scored 62 points.

Below is a breakdown of points awarded to Macedonia and awarded by Macedonia in the first semi-final and grand final of the contest. The nation awarded its 12 points to Albania in the semi-final and the final of the contest.

==== Points awarded to Macedonia ====
Points awarded to Macedonia (Semi-final 1)
Score	Country
12 points	Albania
10 points	Bosnia and Herzegovina
8 points	Serbia
7 points	
6 points	
5 points	
4 points	Moldova
3 points	
2 points	
1 point	Iceland; Russia; Slovakia

==== Points awarded by Macedonia ====
Points awarded by Macedonia (Semi-final 1)
Score	Country
12 points	Albania
10 points	Serbia
8 points	Bosnia and Herzegovina
7 points	Moldova
6 points	Malta
5 points	Belarus
4 points	Belgium
3 points	Greece
2 points	Portugal
1 point	Iceland

Points awarded by Macedonia (Final)
Score	Country
12 points	Albania
10 points	Turkey
8 points	Germany
7 points	Serbia
6 points	Bosnia and Herzegovina
5 points	Georgia
4 points	Armenia
3 points	Azerbaijan
2 points	Denmark
1 point	France

==== Detailed voting results ====
The Macedonian broadcaster revealed the full jury vote breakdown for the grand final as well as the members of the Macedonian jury. No information is known about the televoting results. The following members comprised the Macedonian jury:

- Rade Spasovski (jury chairperson) – journalist in the international coordination department of MRT
- Aleksandra Jovanovska – journalist in the MTV Entertainment department
- Oliver Dimitrov – journalist in the MTV Entertainment department
- Lile Avtovska – music collaborator in MTV
- Suzana Stefska – entertainment editorial office of MRT

Detailed jury voting results from Macedonia (Final)
R/O	Country	Juror 1	Juror 2	Juror 3	Juror 4	Juror 5	Total	Jury Rank	Jury Points
01	Azerbaijan	7	8	6	8	5	34	5	6
02	Spain				1		1		
03	Norway								
04	Moldova	3			5		8	10	1
05	Cyprus								
06	Bosnia and Herzegovina	8	7	8	6	8	37	3	8
07	Belgium								
08	Serbia								
09	Belarus		1				1		
10	Ireland								
11	Greece								
12	United Kingdom								
13	Georgia	6	6	10	10	12	44	2	10
14	Turkey	10	10	7	7	2	36	4	7
15	Albania	12	12	12	12	6	54	1	12
16	Iceland	2		3	2		7		
17	Ukraine		5	4			9	9	2
18	France					1	1		
19	Romania	4	4	1		4	13	8	3
20	Russia								
21	Armenia	5	2			10	17	7	4
22	Germany	1	3	5	4	7	20	6	5
23	Portugal			2			2		
24	Israel				3		3		
25	Denmark								
