= Vlatko Ilievski =

Macedonian singer and actor (1985–2018)

Vlatko Ilievski Влатко Илиевски
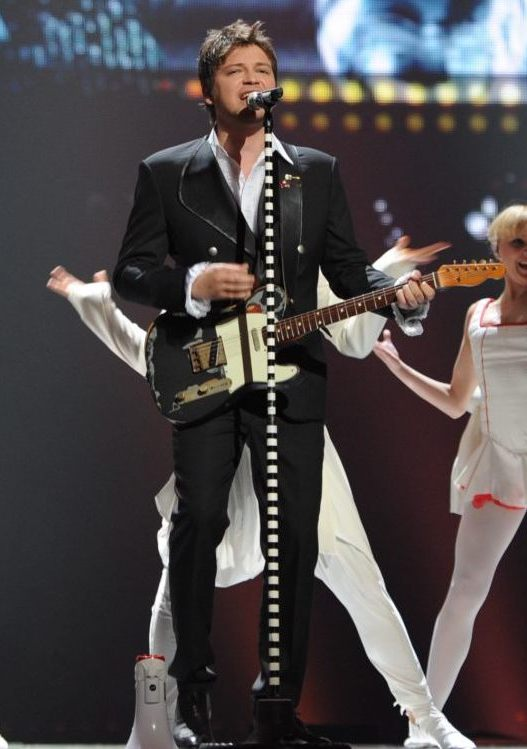

Background information
- Born: Vlatko Ilievski; 2 July 1985; Skopje, SFR Yugoslavia
- Died: 6 July 2018 (aged 33) Skopje, Macedonia
- Genres: Pop, rock
- Occupations: Singer, actor
- Years active: 2000–2018
- Label: Plan B Production

Vlatko Ilievski (Macedonian: Влатко Илиевски; 2 July 1985 – 6 July 2018) was a Macedonian pop rock singer and actor. He was the runner-up to be the Macedonian entry for the Eurovision Song Contest 2010 and represented FYR Macedonia in the Eurovision Song Contest 2011 with the song "Rusinka" in Düsseldorf, Germany. He was previously a member of the rock band "Moral". He was a student of acting at the Faculty of Dramatic Arts, Skopje, where he graduated in 2010 with the drama "Anger" from Stephen King (The Rage).

== Early life ==
Vlatko Ilievski was born in Skopje, Yugoslavia, in present-day North Macedonia. Aged 12, he started playing guitar and singing in local bands in Skopje. In 2000 he performed at the Macedonian Rock-Fest with the band "Made in Macedonia", and won two prizes.

== Career ==
=== Moral ===
In 2000, the Macedonian rock band Morality (Морал) asked Ilievski to join their band. In 2001, they recorded songs and in 2003 they finished the album, "Koga Patuvam". Their songs include: "Панично те сакам", "Скопје", "Ти си", "Ова е Македонија", and "А ти ме убиваш". In 2005, Morality were Deep Purple's support act for their concert in Skopje.

=== Solo ===
Vlatko started his solo career in 2007. His famous songs are: "Небо" (performed at Оhrid fest 2008), "Уште си ми ти", "Со Други Зборови"(performed at the European song contest "Skopje 2008" Metropolis Arena), "Не те можам" (performed at MakFest 2008 with Dani), "Taка требало да биде", "Се што сакав после тебе", "Сите ми се криви", "Гушни ме" (with Tamara), "Скитник", "Најбогат на свет (Najbogatij)" (Skopje Fest 2009, and a prize-winner at RadiskiFestival, March 2009), "Роза сине", "Исцеление", "Пак на старо" (performed at Makfest 2009), "За љубов се пее до крај" (with Risto Samardžiev, prize-winning at Ohrid Fest 2009), "Работнички шампионе", "Среќа" (Skopje fest 2010, winning second prize), and "Есен".

His first solo concert was on 5 June 2010, in the Boris Trajkovski Hall, Skopje, Macedonia, one of the largest arenas in the country. He filled the venue with an audience of around 10,000, in duet with Tamara, and was joined on-stage by his old band. He was supported by local bands Shvaleri and DZHMS; the lead guitarist of the latter is Ivan Ivanov, son of the Macedonian President Gjorge Ivanov, who was in the audience. Ilievski is filming a TV series to be broadcast in September. He again participated in Skopje Fest 2015, the national selection for Macedonia in the Eurovision Song Contest 2015 (the same selection that had given him the chance in 2011), in a duet with Risto Samardžiev with the song Sever-Jug. They tied in last place, 14th place with 0 points.

=== Albums ===
Vlatko Ilievski's first album is Со други зборови ("In Other Words") with 10 songs: Со други зборови, И премногу добро, Сите ми се криви, Така требало да биде, Уште си ми ти, Не те можам (featuring Dani Dimitrovska), Гушни ме (featuring Tamara Todevska), Од утре не, Небо, Скитник.

His second solo album is Најбогат на свет ("Richest in the World") with 10 songs: Среќа, Пред да те знам, И ти и јас, Се што сакав по тебе, Пак на старо, Најбогат на свет, Есен, За љубов се пее до крај (featuring Risto Samardžiev), Не плачи, извини и Небо (unplugged).

== Death ==
Ilievski died in the evening of 6 July 2018. His body was found in his automobile in Skopje, Macedonia. The cause of death was reported as a combined drug intoxication.

Awards and achievements
Preceded by Gjoko Taneski with Jas ja imam silata	Macedonia in the Eurovision Song Contest; 2011	Succeeded by Kaliopi with Crno i belo
Preceded by Gjoko Taneski, Billy Zver and Pejčin	Skopje Fest; Winner; 2011	Succeeded by Lambe Alabakoski
