= Bosnia and Herzegovina in the Eurovision Song Contest 2010 =

- Eurovision Song Contest 2010
- Participating broadcaster: Radio and Television of Bosnia and Herzegovina (BHRT)
- Country: Bosnia and Herzegovina
- Selection process: Internal selection
- Announcement date: Artist: 11 January 2010; Song: 14 March 2010

Competing entry
- Song: "Thunder and Lightning"
- Artist: Vukašin Brajić
- Songwriters: Dino Šaran

Placement
- Semi-final result: Qualified (8th, 59 points)
- Final result: 17th, 51 points

Participation chronology

Bosnia and Herzegovina was represented at the Eurovision Song Contest 2010 with the song "Thunder and Lightning", written by Dino Šaran, and performed by Vukašin Brajić. The Bosnian-Herzegovinian participating broadcaster, Radio and Television of Bosnia and Herzegovina (BHRT), revealed on 11 January 2010 that it had internally selected Brajić to compete at the contest. His song, "Munja i grom", was presented to the public during a show entitled BH Eurosong Show 2010 on 14 March 2010. The song was later translated from Bosnian to English for the contest with the new title "Thunder and Lightning".

Bosnia and Herzegovina was drawn to compete in the first semi-final of the Eurovision Song Contest which took place on 25 May 2010. Performing eighth, "Thunder and Lightning" was announced among the top 10 entries of the first semi-final and therefore qualified to compete in the final on 29 May. It was later revealed that Bosnia and Herzegovina placed eighth out of the 17 participating countries in the semi-final, having been awarded 59 points. In the final, Bosnia and Herzegovina performed sixth and placed 17th out of the 25 participating countries, scoring 51 points.

== Background ==
Prior to the 2010 contest, Radio and Television of Bosnia and Herzegovina (BHRT) and its predecessor national broadcasters had participated in the Eurovision Song Contest representing Bosnia and Herzegovina fifteen times since RTVBiH's first entry in 1993. Their best placing in the contest was third, achieved in 2006 with the song "Lejla" performed by Hari Mata Hari. Following the introduction of semi-finals for the 2004 contest, Bosnia and Herzegovina had, up to the 2010 contest, managed to qualify on each occasion to compete in the final. Their least successful result was 22nd place, achieved in 1996.

As part of its duties as participating broadcaster, BHRT organises the selection of its entry in the Eurovision Song Contest and broadcasts the event in the country. The broadcaster confirmed its intentions to participate in the 2010 contest on 29 October 2009. The broadcasters had selected its entry through an internal selection process since 2006, a selection procedure that was continued for its 2010 entry.

== Before Eurovision ==
=== Internal selection ===
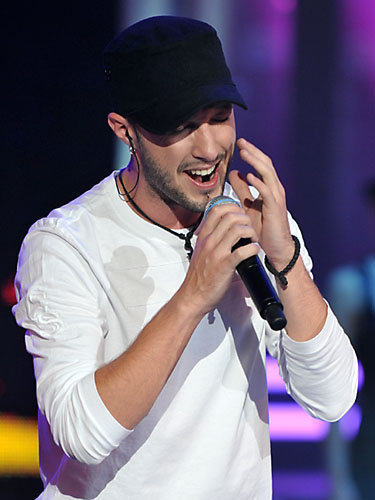
Vukašin Brajić was internally selected to represent Bosnia and Herzegovina in the Eurovision Song Contest 2010

On 24 November 2009, BHRT opened the submission period for artists and composers to submit their entries for consideration up until a 20 December 2009 deadline. Artists were required to be citizens of Bosnia and Herzegovina, while songwriters could be of any nationality. 42 valid submissions out of 60 were received at the closing of the deadline and on 11 January 2010, BHRT announced that they had internally selected Vukašin Brajić to represent them in Oslo with the song "Munja i grom", written by Dino Šaran. Brajić previously attempted to represent Serbia in the Eurovision Song Contest 2009 as part of OT Band, placing second in their national final with the song "Blagoslov za kraj". The eight-member selection committee that selected Brajić and the song to be performed at the contest consisted of Dejan Kukrić (Bosnian Head of Delegation at the Eurovision Song Contest), Jasmin Ferović (music editor at BH Radio 1), Adnan Mušanović (music producer of MP BHRT), Zoran Nikolić (assistant professor at the University of Banja Luka Academy of Arts), Amira Medunjanin (musician), Ismet Arnautalić (producer), Vesna Andree-Zaimović (musicologist) and Vlado Podany (musician).

"Munja i grom" was presented during a television special on 14 March 2010 entitled BH Eurosong Show 2010 and hosted by Ilma Ramčević, Gorjan Kalauzović and Nejra Sitnić. The show was broadcast on BHT 1 and BH Radio 1 as well as streamed online via the broadcaster's website bhrt.ba and the official Eurovision Song Contest website eurovision.tv. In addition to the presentation of the song, the show featured guest performances by Croatian singer Ana Bebić, 2002 and 2007 Macedonian Eurovision entrant Karolina Gočeva, 2009 Bosnian Eurovision entrant Regina, Norwegian Eurovision Song Contest 2009 entrant Alexander Rybak, 2005 Bosnian and 2010 Croatian Eurovision entrant Feminnem, 1993 and 2010 Irish Eurovision entrant Niamh Kavanagh, 2010 Macedonian Eurovision entrant Gjoko Taneski, 2010 Polish Eurovision entrant Marcin Mroziński, and 2010 Serbian Eurovision entrant Milan Stanković as well as a guest appearance by 1994 Bosnian Eurovision entrants Alma Čardžić and Dejan Lazarević. Both Bosnian and English language versions of the song were prepared with BHRT ultimately deciding that the song would be performed in English at Eurovision and titled "Thunder and Lightning". This marked the first time since 2005 that the Bosnian entry would be performed in English. Following its presentation, modifications were made to the song to add a longer bridge, thunder sound effects and make it more rock-like in style; this final version was released by late April 2010.

==== Financial debt ====
It was reported in February 2010 that Bosnia and Herzegovina's participation in the Eurovision Song Contest 2010 could have been put in danger by the EBU due to substantial debts nearing CHF 2.9 million, with BHRT being requested to make a payment of CHF 250,000 by 30 April 2010 in order to avoid disqualification. Bosnian Eurovision Head of Delegation Dejan Kukrić later denied that there was a crisis with unpaid debt, and that the Bosnian participation would go ahead as planned.

=== Promotion ===
Vukašin Brajić made several appearances across Europe to specifically promote "Thunder and Lightning" as the Bosnian Eurovision entry. On 26 February, Brajić performed the song during the final of the Macedonian Eurovision national final Skopje Fest 2010. He also took part in promotional activities in Belgium where he appeared during the TV Limburg talk show Studio TVL and performed during the Pink Nation event which was held in Antwerp on 30 April. After Belgium, Brajić was in Ljubljana, Slovenia on 5 May where he was a guest on the Spet doma show on Radiotelevizija Slovenija.

== At Eurovision ==
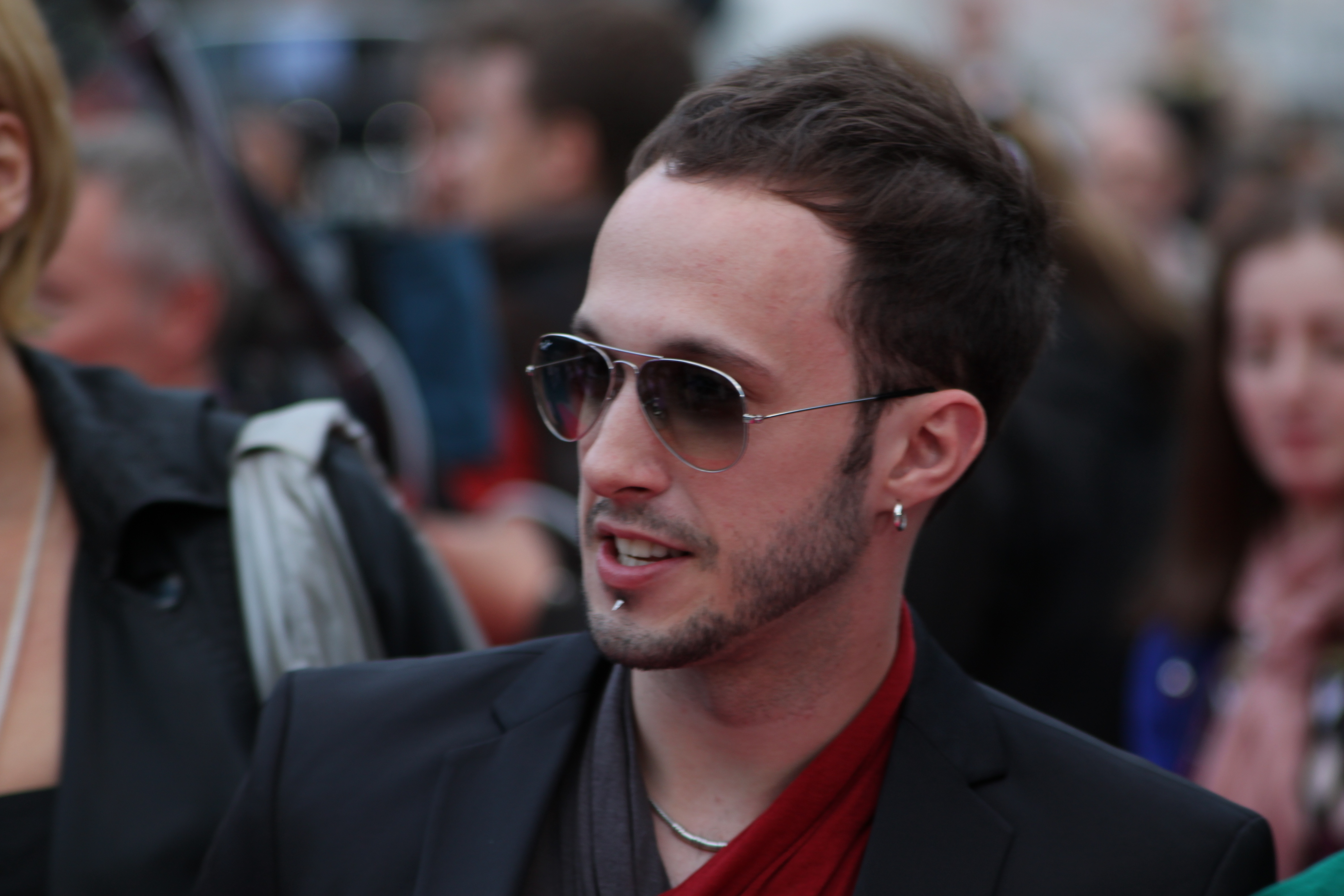
Vukašin Brajić at the Eurovision Opening Party in Oslo

The Eurovision Song Contest 2010 took place at Telenor Arena in Oslo, Norway, and consisted of two semi-finals held on 25 and 27 May, respectively, and the grand final on 29 May 2010. According to the Eurovision rules, all participating countries, except the host nation and the "Big Four", consisting of France, Germany, Spain and the United Kingdom, were required to qualify from one of the two semi-finals to compete for the grand final, although the top 10 countries from the respective semi-final progress to the grand final. The European Broadcasting Union (EBU) split up the competing countries into five different pots based on voting patterns from previous contests evaluated by Digame, in order to decrease the influence of neighbour and diaspora voting. On 7 February 2010, an allocation draw was held which placed each country into one of the two semi-finals and determined which half of the show they would perform in. Bosnia and Herzegovina was placed into the first semi-final, to be held on 25 May 2010, and was scheduled to perform in the first half of the show. The running order for the semi-finals was decided through another draw on 23 March 2010 and Bosnia and Herzegovina was set to perform in position 8, following the entry from Serbia and before the entry from Poland.

The two semi-finals and the final were broadcast in Bosnia and Herzegovina on BHT 1 with commentary by Dejan Kukrić. Additionally, a public screening of the final was organized at the Children of Sarajevo Square in Sarajevo.

=== Performances ===
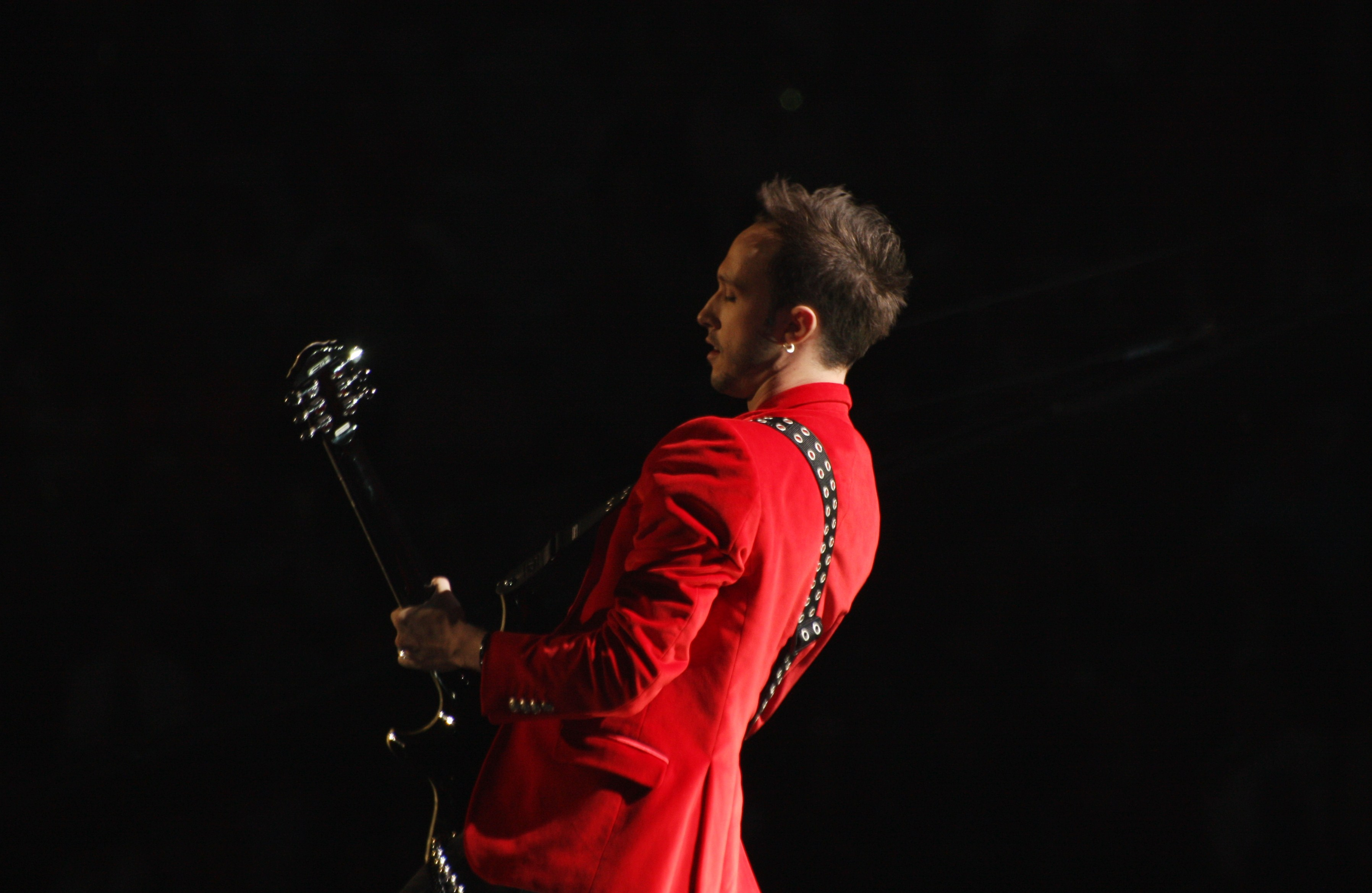
Vukašin Brajić during a rehearsal before the first semi-final

Vukašin Brajić took part in technical rehearsals on 16 and 20 May, followed by dress rehearsals on 24 and 25 May. The Bosnian performance featured Brajić in a red jacket, t-shirt and jeans, joined on stage by five backing vocalists. During the performance, he dropped his electric guitar to the floor which he originally wore around his shoulder. The stage lighting displayed white and blue colours with strobe lighting featured throughout the performance. The performance also featured smoke effects and the use of a wind machine. The five backing vocalists that joined Brajić were: Danijela Večerinović, Dunja Galineo Kajević, Edvin Hadžić, Elma Selimović and Marko Vulinović.

At the end of the first semi-final, held on 25 May, Bosnia and Herzegovina was announced as having finished in the top 10, subsequently qualifying for the grand final. It was later revealed that Bosnia and Herzegovina had placed eighth in the semi-final, receiving a total of 59 points. Shortly after the first semi-final, a winners' press conference was held for the ten qualifying countries. As part of this press conference, the qualifying artists took part in a draw to determine the running order for the final. This draw was done in the order the countries were announced during the semi-final. Bosnia and Herzegovina was drawn to perform in position 6, following the entry from Cyprus and before the entry from Belgium. For the final, held four days later on 29 May, Brajić performed a repeat of his semi-final performance and at the end of the event, Bosnia and Herzegovina placed 17th, scoring 51 points.

=== Voting ===
Voting during the three shows involved each country awarding points from 1–8, 10 and 12 as determined by a combination of 50% national jury and 50% televoting. Each nation's jury consisted of five music industry professionals who are citizens of the country they represent. This jury judged each entry based on: vocal capacity; the stage performance; the song's composition and originality; and the overall impression by the act. In addition, no member of a national jury was permitted to be related in any way to any of the competing acts in such a way that they cannot vote impartially and independently.

Following the release of the full split voting by the EBU after the conclusion of the competition, it was revealed that Bosnia and Herzegovina had placed 16th with the public televote and 14th with the jury vote in the final. In the public vote, Bosnia and Herzegovina scored 35 points, while with the jury vote, Bosnia and Herzegovina scored 65 points. In the first semi-final, Bosnia and Herzegovina placed 11th with the public televote with 42 points and fifth with the jury vote, scoring 86 points.

Below is a breakdown of points awarded to Bosnia and Herzegovina and awarded by Bosnia and Herzegovina in the first semi-final and grand final of the contest. The nation awarded its maximum 12 points to Serbia in both the semi-final and final of the contest. The Bosnian spokesperson, who announced the Bosnian votes during the final, was Ivana Vidmar.

==== Points awarded to Bosnia and Herzegovina ====
Points awarded to Bosnia and Herzegovina (Semi-final 1)
Score	Country
12 points	Serbia
10 points	
8 points	Macedonia
7 points	Albania
6 points	France; Poland
5 points	Greece; Slovakia
4 points	Belarus
3 points	Malta
2 points	Russia
1 point	Moldova

Points awarded to Bosnia and Herzegovina (Final)
Score	Country
12 points	Serbia
10 points	Croatia
8 points	Turkey
7 points	
6 points	Albania; Macedonia
5 points	France
4 points	Slovenia
3 points	
2 points	
1 point	

==== Points awarded by Bosnia and Herzegovina ====
Points awarded by Bosnia and Herzegovina (Semi-final 1)
Score	Country
12 points	Serbia
10 points	Macedonia
8 points	Greece
7 points	Albania
6 points	Malta
5 points	Slovakia
4 points	Belgium
3 points	Portugal
2 points	Russia
1 point	Estonia

Points awarded by Bosnia and Herzegovina (Final)
Score	Country
12 points	Serbia
10 points	Turkey
8 points	Germany
7 points	Azerbaijan
6 points	Greece
5 points	Albania
4 points	Georgia
3 points	France
2 points	Romania
1 point	Israel
