= France in the Eurovision Song Contest 2010 =

- Eurovision Song Contest 2010
- Participating broadcaster: France Télévisions
- Country: France
- Selection process: Internal selection
- Announcement date: Artist: 19 February 2010; Song: 20 March 2010

Competing entry
- Song: "Allez Ola Olé"
- Artist: Jessy Matador
- Songwriters: Hugues Ducamin; Jacques Ballue

Placement
- Final result: 12th, 82 points

Participation chronology

France was represented at the Eurovision Song Contest 2010 with the song "Allez Ola Olé", written by Hugues Ducamin and Jacques Ballue, and performed by Jessy Matador. The French participating broadcaster, France Télévisions, internally selected its entry for the contest. Jessy Matador was officially announced by France 3 as the French representative on 19 February 2010 and later the song was presented to the public on 20 March 2010.

As a member of the "Big Four", France automatically qualified to compete in the final of the Eurovision Song Contest. Performing in position 18, France placed twelfth out of the 25 participating countries with 82 points.

== Background ==
Prior to the 2010 contest, France Télévisions and its predecessor national broadcasters, have participated in the Eurovision Song Contest representing France fifty times RTF's debut in 1956. They first won the contest in 1958 with "Dors, mon amour" performed by André Claveau. In the 1960s, they won three times, with "Tom Pillibi" performed by Jacqueline Boyer in 1960, "Un premier amour" performed by Isabelle Aubret in 1962, and "Un jour, un enfant" performed by Frida Boccara, who won in 1969 in a four-way tie with the Netherlands, Spain, and the United Kingdom. Their fifth – and so far latest – victory came in 1977 with "L'oiseau et l'enfant" performed by Marie Myriam. They has also finished second four times, with Paule Desjardins in 1957, Catherine Ferry in 1976, Joëlle Ursull in 1990, and Amina in 1991 (who lost out to Sweden's Carola in a tie-break). In the 21st century, France has had less success, only making the top ten three times, with "Je n'ai que mon âme" performed by Natasha St-Pier finishing fourth in 2001, "Il faut du temps" by Sandrine François finishing fifth in 2002, and "Et s'il fallait le faire" by Patricia Kaas finishing eighth in 2009.

As part of its duties as participating broadcaster, France Télévisions organises the selection of its entry in the Eurovision Song Contest and broadcasts the event in the country. The broadcaster confirmed that it would participate in the 2010 contest on 20 November 2009. The French broadcaster had used both national finals and internal selection to choose its entry in the past. The French entries from 2005 to 2007 were selected via a national final that featured several competing acts. In 2008 and 2009, the broadcaster opted to internally select the entry, a procedure that was continued in order to select the 2010 entry.

== Before Eurovision ==
=== Internal selection ===
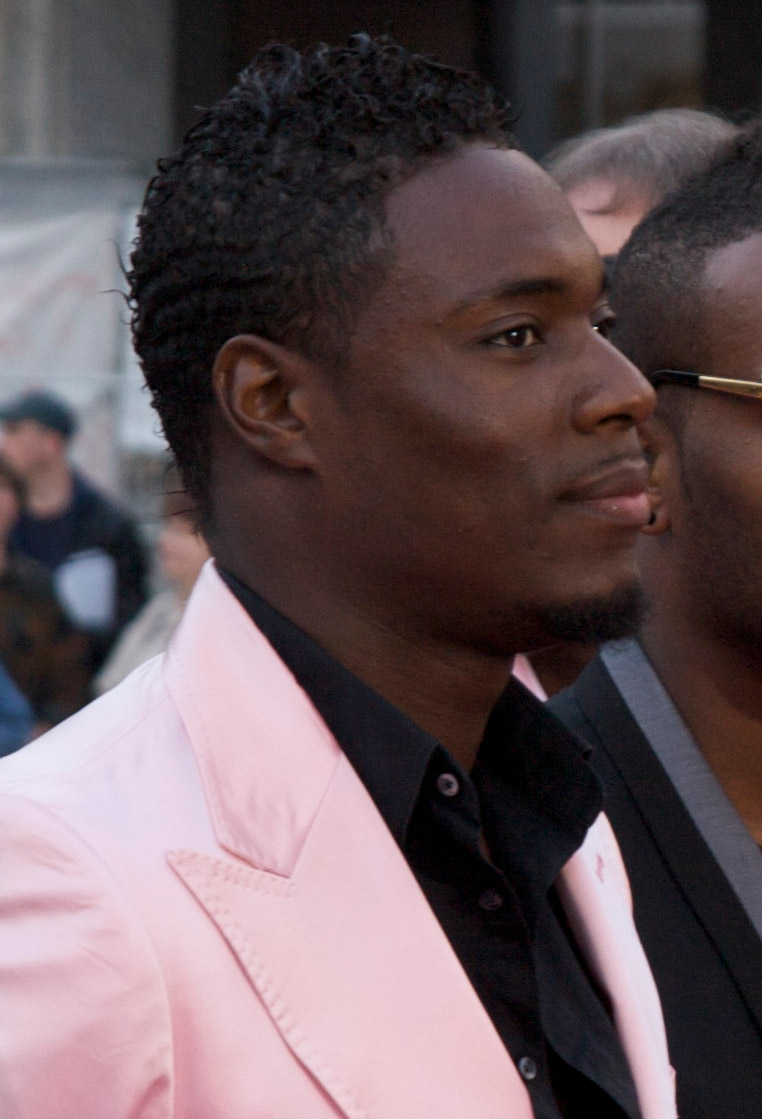
Jessy Matador was internally selected to represent France

France 3 announced in late 2009 that the French entry for the Eurovision Song Contest 2010 would be selected internally. On 19 February 2010, France 2 entertainment director Nicolas Pernikoff announced during the Europe 1 talk show programme Le Grand Direct, hosted by Jean-Marc Morandini, that the French entrant for the Eurovision Song Contest 2010 would be Congolese singer Jessy Matador. Information that Matador would represent France at the Eurovision Song Contest 2010 was leaked on 17 January 2010 during Le Grand Direct. Among the artists considered by France 3 before the broadcaster finalised their decision internally included Christophe Willem (who would perform with DJ David Guetta), Emmanuel Moire, Jessy Matador and Julie Zenatti, with Willem and Zenatti having refused the proposal.

Jessy Matador's song "Allez Ola Olé" was written by Hugues Ducamin and Jacques Ballue and features a reference to the 1998 FIFA World Cup album Music of the World Cup: Allez! Ola! Ole! as France Télévisions hoped to create a song to promote the forthcoming 2010 FIFA World Cup. The entry was previewed online via the website chartsinfrance.net on 19 March 2010 and formally presented to the public on 20 March 2010.

=== Controversy ===
Following the selection of Jessy Matador as the French entrant, French Eurovision fans complained that France Télévisions sacrifices Eurovision for the name of promoting other events "which should not be allowed from a public channel", and that the broadcaster were not willing to win the contest. France 3 subsequently issued a statement on 16 March mentioning the song in combination with Matador's stage presence would "make it possible for France to glow on the Eurovision stage". The release of "Allez Ola Olé" was met with positive feedback abroad with the public believing it would be singled out for its festive and upbeat nature in a ballad-dominant year.

== At Eurovision ==
According to Eurovision rules, all nations with the exceptions of the host country and the "Big Four" (France, Germany, Spain and the United Kingdom) are required to qualify from one of two semi-finals in order to compete for the final; the top ten countries from each semi-final progress to the final. As a member of the "Big 4", France automatically qualified to compete in the final on 29 May 2010. In addition to their participation in the final, France is also required to broadcast and vote in one of the two semi-finals. During the semi-final allocation draw on 7 February 2010, France was assigned to broadcast and vote in the second semi-final on 27 May 2010. The EBU's Reference Group later approved a request by the French broadcaster for France to broadcast and vote in the first semi-final on 27 May 2010 instead due to scheduling problems.

In France, the first semi-final was broadcast live on France 4 with commentary by Peggy Olmi and Yann Renoard with the second semi-final broadcast on France 4 via a tape delay, while the final was broadcast live on France 3 with commentary by Cyril Hanouna and Stéphane Bern. The French spokesperson, who announced the French votes during the final, was Audrey Chauveau.

=== Final ===
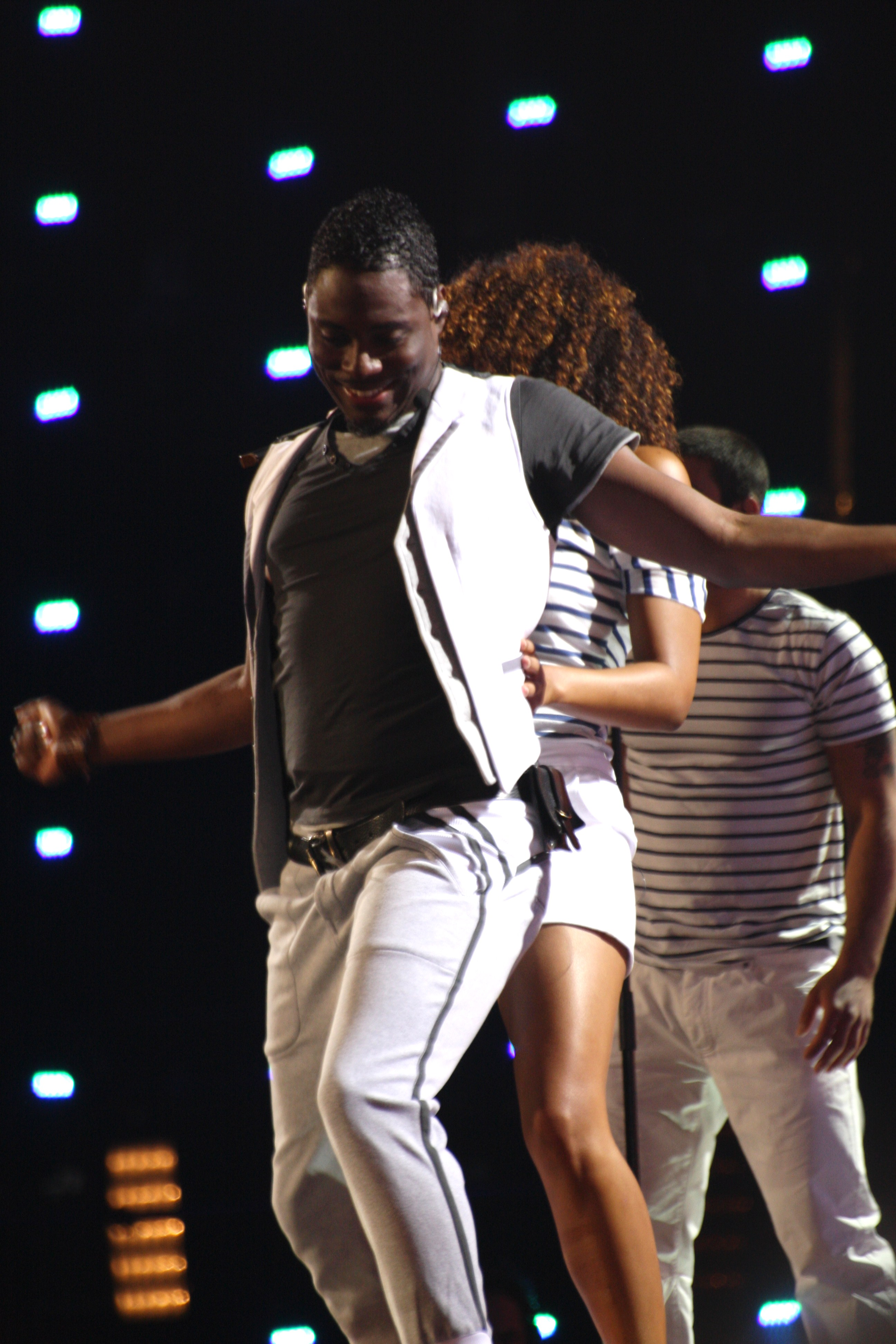
Jessy Matador during a rehearsal before the final

Jessy Matador took part in technical rehearsals on 22 and 23 May, followed by dress rehearsals on 28 and 29 May. This included the jury final on 28 May where the professional juries of each country watched and voted on the competing entries. The running order for the semi-finals and final was decided through another draw on 23 March 2010 and France was subsequently placed to perform in position 18, following the entry from Ukraine and before the entry from Romania.

The French performance featured Jessy Matador on stage wearing a white waistcoat and grey trousers and performing a choreographed routine with five backing performers, including three dancers and two backing vocalists: Nedjim Mahtallah and Jessie Fasano. During the performance, Matador made use of the stage catwalk and together with the backing performers concluded the performance by performing a tribal chant. The stage colours were predominately yellow with blue and gold lighting which displayed the word "Allez". The performance also featured smoke, pyrotechnic and flame effects. France placed twelfth in the final, scoring 82 points.

=== Voting ===
Voting during the three shows consisted of 50 percent public televoting and 50 percent from a jury deliberation. The jury consisted of five music industry professionals who were citizens of the country they represent. This jury was asked to judge each contestant based on: vocal capacity; the stage performance; the song's composition and originality; and the overall impression by the act. In addition, no member of a national jury could be related in any way to any of the competing acts in such a way that they cannot vote impartially and independently.

Following the release of the full split voting by the EBU after the conclusion of the competition, it was revealed that France had placed eighth with the public televote and twenty-second with the jury vote. In the public vote, France scored 151 points and in the jury vote the nation scored 34 points.

Below is a breakdown of points awarded to France and awarded by France in the first semi-final and grand final of the contest, and the breakdown of the jury voting and televoting conducted during the two shows:

==== Points awarded to France ====
Points awarded to France (Final)
Score	Country
12 points	
10 points	
8 points	Finland; Greece
7 points	Denmark; Portugal
6 points	Armenia; Iceland; Ireland
5 points	
4 points	Norway; Serbia
3 points	Bosnia and Herzegovina; Croatia; Cyprus; Germany; Israel; Slovenia
2 points	Malta; Spain; United Kingdom
1 point	Estonia; Macedonia

==== Points awarded by France ====
Points awarded by France (Semi-final 1)
Score	Country
12 points	Serbia
10 points	Belgium
8 points	Portugal
7 points	Poland
6 points	Bosnia and Herzegovina
5 points	Iceland
4 points	Greece
3 points	Moldova
2 points	Albania
1 point	Belarus

Points awarded by France (Final)
Score	Country
12 points	Turkey
10 points	Serbia
8 points	Portugal
7 points	Belgium
6 points	Armenia
5 points	Bosnia and Herzegovina
4 points	Greece
3 points	Germany
2 points	Ukraine
1 point	Israel
