= Jas ja imam silata =

Macedonian pop-rock song

"Jas ja imam silata Јас ја имам силата"

Single by Gjoko Taneski feat. Billy Zver & Pejčin
- Released: 18 February 2010
- Genre: Pop, Pop-Rock, Hip hop
- Length: 3:00
- Songwriters: Kristijan Gabrovski, Darko Tasev, Vesna Malinova

Gjoko Taneski singles chronology
"Nikogas Dosta" (2009)	"Jas ja imam silata Јас ја имам силата" (2010)	"Kje napravam magija" (2010)

Billy Zver singles chronology
"Jas ja imam silata" (2010)	"Barbika" (2010)

(North Macedonia) "Jas ja imam silata"

Eurovision Song Contest 2010 entry
- Country: Macedonia
- Artist: Gjoko Taneski
- Language: Macedonian
- Composer: Kristijan Gabrovski
- Lyricist: Kristijan Gabrovski

Finals performance
- Semi-final result: 15th [of 17]
- Semi-final points: 37

Entry chronology
- ◄ "Neshto shto ke ostane" (2009)
- "Rusinka" (2011) ►

"Jas ja imam silata" (Macedonian: Јас ја имам силата; English: I have the strength) is a Macedonian pop-rock song, composed by Kristijan Gabrovski and performed by Gjoko Taneski together with Billy Zver & Pejčin as the Macedonian entry for the Eurovision Song Contest 2010. The song was selected on 20 February 2010 from 16 participating songs at the final of Skopje Fest 2010. The song gained the most points in the final and tied for first place with Vlatko Ilievski before being declared the winner.

== Background ==
=== Production history ===
The song was composed and written by Macedonian composer Kristijan Gabrovski, also known as Risto Bombata and the arrangement was made by Darko Tasev.

After winning the Macedonian national final it was decided that the arrangement and the lyrics would remain the same and the song would be performed in Macedonian at Eurovision. In early May 2010, an English version with the title "I'll Forget You" will be released. The lyrics for the English version are written by Vesna Malinova.

== Skopje Fest 2010 ==
The song was presented for the first time on the first semi-final of Skopje Fest 2010, being performed 10th. At the end of the semi-final it placed 4th with 15 points (together from the jury and the televoting). In the final that was held on 20 February, the song was performed 11th. It won with a total of 22 points (12 from the jury and 10 from the televote).

== Music video ==
Under the motto My name is Macedonia, the official music video for the song was shot in March 2010. The video was shot in Tomato Production's studios and was directed by Branislav Bane Popović. In the video, the beauties of Macedonia through some of the best Macedonian female models such as Natalija Grubović, Marijana Stojkovska, and Radica Lelova are shown. Taneski and Billy Zver are wearing elegant suits, and the girls are clothed in provocative and attractive creations made by Elena Luka. At the end of the video there is a text saying My name is Love. The video premiered on 30 March 2010, on MRT.

== Eurovision Song Contest 2010 ==
The song was the 15th entry performed in Oslo on 25 May 2010. On the stage, together with Taneski, Billy Zver and Pejčin, was the young Macedonian singer Deana Nikolovska and two more girls. Deana sang the backing vocals and made the scene dancing with the girls.

== Credits and personnel ==
- Main vocals: Gjoko Taneski
- Songwriting: Kristijan Gabrovski, Darko Tasev, Vesna Malinova, Ilija Delov, Nikola Tefov
- Production: Kristijan Gabrovski
- Recording: Kristijan Gabrovski
- Audio Engineering: Nikola Tefov
