= Belgium in the Eurovision Song Contest 2010 =

- Eurovision Song Contest 2010
- Participating broadcaster: Vlaamse Radio- en Televisieomroeporganisatie (VRT)
- Country: Belgium
- Selection process: Internal selection
- Announcement date: Artist: 25 November 2009; Song: 7 March 2010

Competing entry
- Song: "Me and My Guitar"
- Artist: Tom Dice
- Songwriters: Tom Dice; Jeroen Swinnen; Ashley Hicklin

Placement
- Semi-final result: Qualified (1st, 167 points)
- Final result: 6th, 143 points

Participation chronology

Belgium was represented at the Eurovision Song Contest 2010 with the song "Me and My Guitar", written by Tom Dice, Jeroen Swinnen, and Ashley Hicklin, and performed by Tom Dice himself. The Belgian participating broadcaster, Flemish Vlaamse Radio- en Televisieomroeporganisatie (VRT), internally selected its entry for the contest. The artist was announced on 25 November 2009, and the song was presented to the public on 7 March 2010 during the television special Eurosong 2010: een song voor Tom Dice!.

Belgium was drawn to compete in the first semi-final of the Eurovision Song Contest which took place on 25 May 2010. Performing during the show in position 10, "Me and My Guitar" was announced among the top 10 entries of the first semi-final and therefore qualified to compete in the final on 23 May. This marked the first qualification to the final for Belgium since the introduction of semi-finals in 2004. It was later revealed that Belgium placed first out of the 17 participating countries in the semi-final with 167 points. In the final, Belgium performed in position 7 and placed sixth out of the 25 participating countries, scoring 143 points.

== Background ==
Prior to the 2010 contest, Belgium had participated in the Eurovision Song Contest fifty-one times since its debut as one of seven countries to take part in 1956. Since then, they have won the contest on one occasion in 1986 with the song "J'aime la vie", performed by Sandra Kim. Following the introduction of semi-finals for the 2004 contest, Belgium had been featured in only one final. In 2009, the song "Copycat" performed by Copycat, placed seventeenth in the first semi-final and failed to advance to the final.

The Belgian participation in the contest alternates between two broadcasters: Flemish Vlaamse Radio- en Televisieomroeporganisatie (VRT) and Walloon Radio-télévision belge de la Communauté française (RTBF) at the time, with both broadcasters sharing the broadcasting rights. Both broadcasters –and their predecessors– had selected the Belgian entry using national finals and internal selections in the past. In 2008, VRT organised the national final Eurosong in order to select the Belgian entry, while in 2009, RTBF internally selected both the artist and song. On 13 May 2009, VRT confirmed its participation in the 2010 contest and continued the internal selection procedure. This marked the first time since 1985 that VRT did not hold a public selection to select its entry; the broadcaster previously revealed that it would consider new possibilities related to an adjustment of the format of Eurosong by contacting several experts to develop a new selection process based on seven criteria listed by the broadcaster.

== Before Eurovision ==
=== Internal selection ===
The Belgian entry for the 2010 Eurovision Song Contest was selected via an internal selection by VRT together with an international jury panel following conversations with record labels, composers and music experts. On 25 November 2009, the broadcaster held a press conference at the Reyerslaan in Schaerbeek where they announced that they had selected Tom Dice to represent Belgium in Oslo. Dice was the runner-up in the third series of the reality singing competition X Factor Belgium. Among artists that were previously rumoured to be selected for the competition included Turkish Eurovision Song Contest 2009 participant Hadise, Milk Inc., Natalia and Belgian Eurovision Song Contest 2003 participant Urban Trad. After a number of writing sessions, three songs were presented to VRT, from which the song "Me and My Guitar", written by Dice, Jeroen Swinnen, and Ashley Hicklin was chosen.

"Me and My Guitar" was presented to the public on 7 March 2010 during the television special Eurosong 2010: een song voor Tom Dice!, which took place at VRT's Studio 5 in Schaerbeek and was hosted by Bart Peeters. The show was broadcast on Eén as well as online at the official Eurovision Song Contest website eurovision.tv. In addition to the presentation of the song, five experts also provided suggestions to Dice for his Eurovision performance. The experts were Marcel Vanthilt (singer and television presenter), Siska Schoeters (Studio Brussel presenter), André Vermeulen (Belgian commentator at the Eurovision Song Contest), Peter Van de Veire (radio MNM presenter) and Sergio (Belgian 2002 participant). The show was watched by 885,162 viewers in Belgium with a market share of more than 35%. Tom Dice later filmed the music video for "Me and My Guitar" in the United States, and the video was released to the public on 21 April 2010.

Song considered in the internal selection
Song	Songwriter(s)
"Angel"	Tom Dice
"Lucy"	Tom Dice, Tom Helsen
"Me and My Guitar"	Tom Dice, Jeroen Swinnen, Ashley Hicklin

==== Chart performance ====
The week after the song presentation, "Me and My Guitar" entered at number 2 in the Flemish charts and at number 24 in the Walloon charts. The song also entered into the Dutch Top 100 at number 85, and "Me and My Guitar" went to number one in Flanders and number 18 in Wallonia the following week.

=== Promotion ===
Tom Dice specifically promoted "Me and My Guitar" as the Belgian Eurovision entry on 24 April 2010 by performing during the Eurovision in Concert event which was held at the Lexion venue in Zaanstad, Netherlands and hosted by Cornald Maas and Marga Bult. Dice also performed together with participants from seven countries during the Pink Nation event which was held in Antwerp on 30 April.

== At Eurovision ==
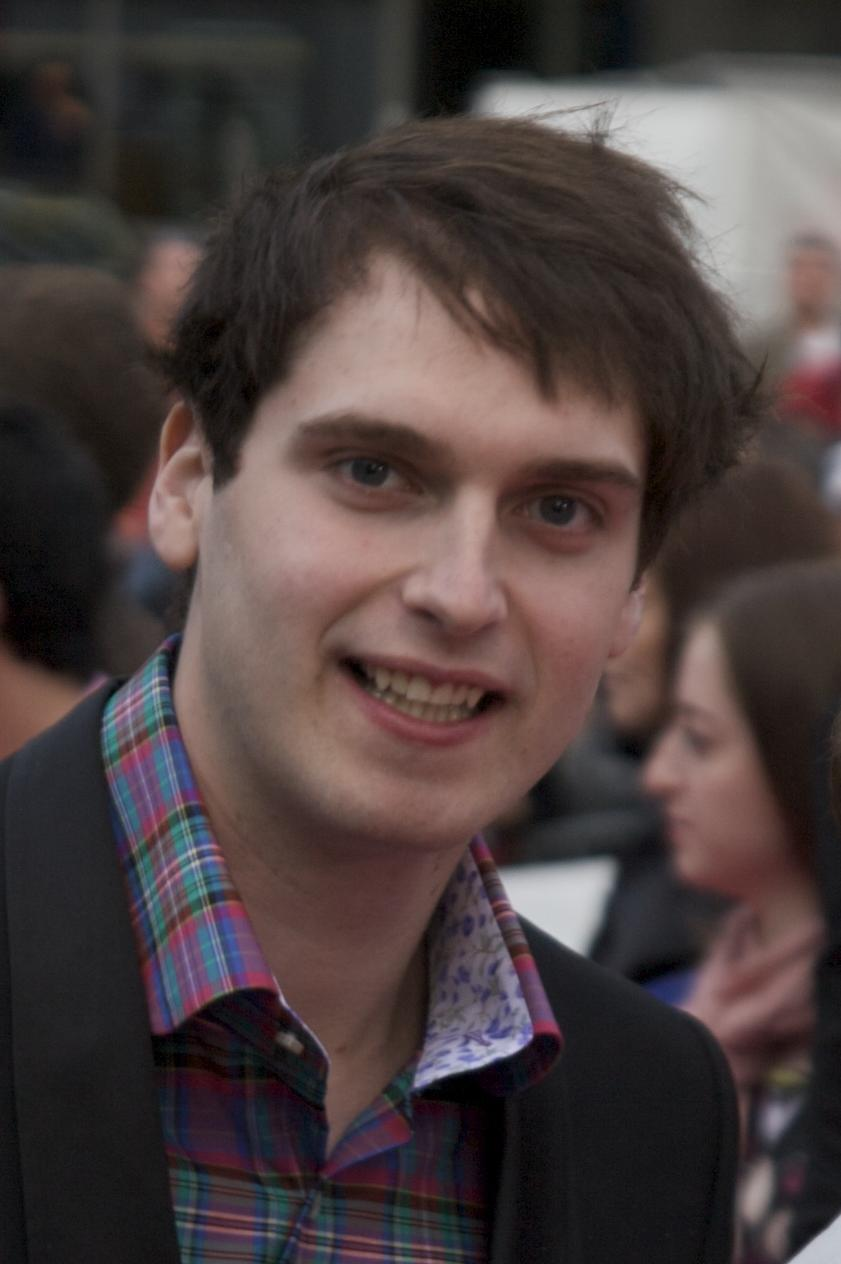
Tom Dice at the Eurovision Opening Party in Oslo

According to Eurovision rules, all nations with the exceptions of the host country and the "Big Four" (France, Germany, Spain and the United Kingdom) were required to qualify from one of two semi-finals in order to compete for the final; the top ten countries from each semi-final progress to the final. The European Broadcasting Union (EBU) split up the competing countries into six different pots based on voting patterns from previous contests, with countries with favourable voting histories put into the same pot. On 7 February 2010, a special allocation draw was held which placed each country into one of the two semi-finals, as well as which half of the show they would perform in. Belgium was placed into the second semi-final, to be held on 27 May 2010, and was scheduled to perform in the second half of the show. The running order for the semi-finals was decided through another draw on 23 March 2010 and Belgium was set to perform in position 8, following the entry from Poland and before the entry from Malta.

The two semi-finals and the final was broadcast in Belgium by both the Flemish and Walloon broadcasters. VRT broadcast the shows on één with commentary in Dutch by André Vermeulen and Bart Peeters. RTBF televised the shows on La Une with commentary in French by Jean-Pierre Hautier and Jean-Louis Lahaye; the second semi-final aired on a 50-minute delay on La Une. The final was also broadcast by VRT on Radio 2 with commentary in Dutch by Sven Pichal and Michel Follet, and by RTBF on La Première with commentary in French by Patrick Duhamel and Corinne Boulangier. The Belgian spokesperson, who announced the Belgian votes during the final, was Katja Retsin.

=== Semi-final ===
Tom Dice took part in technical rehearsals on 17 and 21 May, followed by dress rehearsals on 24 and 25 May. This included the jury show on 24 May where the professional juries of each country watched and voted on the competing entries.

The Belgian performance featured Tom Dice dressed in a dark blue trousers and waistcoat as well as a light blue shirt, and performing on the centre of the catwalk together with two backing vocalists who were placed at the back of the main stage. The stage backdrop displayed black and orange lights while Dice played a blue guitar throughout the performance. The backing vocalists that joined Tom Dice during the performance were Jimmy Colman and Mátyás Blanckaert.

At the end of the show, Belgium was announced as having finished in the top 10 and subsequently qualifying for the grand final. This marked the first qualification to the final for Belgium since the introduction of semi-finals in 2004. It was later revealed that Belgium placed first in the semi-final, receiving a total of 167 points.

=== Final ===
Shortly after the first semi-final, a winners' press conference was held for the ten qualifying countries. As part of this press conference, the qualifying artists took part in a draw to determine the running order for the final. This draw was done in the order the countries were announced during the semi-final. Belgium was drawn to perform in position 7, following the entry from Bosnia and Herzegovina and before the entry from Serbia.

Tom Dice once again took part in dress rehearsals on 28 and 29 May before the final, including the jury final where the professional juries cast their final votes before the live show. Tom Dice performed a repeat of his semi-final performance during the final on 29 May. Belgium placed sixth in the final, scoring 143 points.

=== Voting ===
Voting during the three shows consisted of 50 percent public televoting and 50 percent from a jury deliberation. The jury consisted of five music industry professionals who were citizens of the country they represent. This jury was asked to judge each contestant based on: vocal capacity; the stage performance; the song's composition and originality; and the overall impression by the act. In addition, no member of a national jury could be related in any way to any of the competing acts in such a way that they cannot vote impartially and independently.

Following the release of the full split voting by the EBU after the conclusion of the competition, it was revealed that Belgium had placed fourteenth with the public televote and second with the jury vote in the final. In the public vote, Belgium scored 76 points, while with the jury vote, Belgium scored 185 points. In the first semi-final, Belgium placed third with the public televote with 146 points and first with the jury vote, scoring 165 points.

Below is a breakdown of points awarded to Belgium and awarded by Belgium in the first semi-final and grand final of the contest. The nation awarded its 12 points to Iceland in the semi-final and to Greece in the final of the contest.

==== Points awarded to Belgium ====
Points awarded to Belgium (Semi-final 1)
Score	Country
12 points	Germany; Iceland; Malta; Poland; Portugal
10 points	Finland; France; Greece; Russia; Slovakia
8 points	Belarus; Estonia; Latvia; Spain
7 points	Serbia
6 points	Moldova
5 points	
4 points	Albania; Bosnia and Herzegovina; Macedonia
3 points	
2 points	
1 point	

Points awarded to Belgium (Final)
Score	Country
12 points	Germany
10 points	Denmark; Iceland; Ireland; Malta; Poland; Slovakia
8 points	
7 points	France; Lithuania; Switzerland
6 points	Finland; Greece; Netherlands
5 points	Portugal; Russia; Serbia
4 points	Latvia; Romania
3 points	Estonia; Norway
2 points	Sweden
1 point	Ukraine

==== Points awarded by Belgium ====
Points awarded by Belgium (Semi-final 1)
Score	Country
12 points	Iceland
10 points	Greece
8 points	Albania
7 points	Finland
6 points	Poland
5 points	Russia
4 points	Portugal
3 points	Serbia
2 points	Moldova
1 point	Slovakia

Points awarded by Belgium (Final)
Score	Country
12 points	Greece
10 points	Germany
8 points	Iceland
7 points	Armenia
6 points	Turkey
5 points	Azerbaijan
4 points	Georgia
3 points	Albania
2 points	Denmark
1 point	Spain
