= Serbia in the Eurovision Song Contest 2010 =

- Eurovision Song Contest 2010
- Participating broadcaster: Radio Television of Serbia (RTS)
- Country: Serbia
- Selection process: Tri pa jedan za Oslo
- Selection date: 13 March 2010

Competing entry
- Song: "Ovo je Balkan"
- Artist: Milan Stanković
- Songwriters: Goran Bregović; Marina Tucaković; Ljiljana Jorgovanović

Placement
- Semi-final result: Qualified (5th, 79 points)
- Final result: 13th, 72 points

Participation chronology

Serbia was represented at the Eurovision Song Contest 2010 with the song "Ovo je Balkan" ("This is the Balkans") written by Goran Bregović, Marina Tucaković, and Ljiljana Jorgovanović, and performed by Milan Stanković. The Serbian participating broadcaster, Radio Television of Serbia (RTS), organised the national final Tri pa jedan za Oslo in order to select its entry for the contest. Three entries competed in the national final on 13 March 2010, which resulted in "Ovo je Balkan" performed by Stanković emerging as the winner following a public televote.

Serbia was drawn to compete in the first semi-final of the Eurovision Song Contest which took place on 25 May 2010. Performing during the show in position 7, "Ovo je Balkan" was announced among the top 10 entries of the first semi-final and therefore qualified to compete in the final on 29 May. It was later revealed that Serbia placed fifth out of the 17 participating countries in the semi-final with 79 points. In the final, Serbia performed in position 8 and placed thirteenth out of the 25 participating countries, scoring 72 points.

== Background ==
Prior to the 2010 contest, Radio Television of Serbia (RTS) had participated in the Eurovision Song Contest representing Serbia as an independent nation three times since its first entry in 2007, winning the contest with their debut entry "Molitva" performed by Marija Šerifović. Since 2007, two out of Serbia's three entries have featured in the final, with the 2009 entry "Cipela" performed by Marko Kon and Milaan failing to qualify Serbia to the final.

As part of its duties as participating broadcaster, RTS organises the selection of its entry in the Eurovision Song Contest and broadcasts the event in the country. The broadcaster confirmed its intentions to participate in the 2010 contest on 8 November 2009. In late November 2009, it was reported that the broadcasters were in discussions to shift their selection strategy following ongoing controversy over the Beovizija national final used since 2007 and its 2009 entry failing to qualify to the final. In the event that RTS internally selected its entry, the rock band Negative would represent Serbia after lead vocalist Ivana Peters stated that they would represent the nation only if a different selection method was introduced.

== Before Eurovision ==
=== Tri pa jedan za Oslo ===
Tri pa jedan za Oslo (transl. Three and then one for Oslo) was the national final organised by RTS in order to select its entry for the Eurovision Song Contest 2010. The selection was held on 13 March 2010 took place at the studios of RTS in Košutnjak, Belgrade, hosted by Maja Nikolić and broadcast on RTS 1, RTS Sat, via radio on Radio Belgrade 1 as well as streamed online via the broadcaster's website rts.rs. The show was also broadcast in Bosnia and Herzegovina on RTRS as well as streamed online via its website rtrs.tv.

==== Competing entries ====
RTS announced during a press conference on 19 January 2010 that musician Goran Bregović would compose three songs for the national final. Bregović invited ten potential candidates for auditions that were held at his studio in Belgrade between 16 and 18 February 2010, and the three competing acts selected by Bregović in consultation with RTS were announced on 25 February 2010.

Artists selection – 16–18 February 2010
- Adil Maksutović
- Emina Jahović
- Jelena Marković (Note: As a featuring singer for Oliver Katić)
- Marija Lazić
- Marko Vulinović
- Milan Stanković
- Minja Samardžić
- Nenad Ćeranić
- Oliver Katić
- Željko Vasić

Competing entries
Artist	Song	Songwriters
Emina Jahović	"Ti kvariigro" (Ти квариигро)	Goran Bregović; Ljiljana Jorgovanović; Marina Tucaković
Milan Stanković	"Ovo je Balkan" (Ово је Балкан)	Goran Bregović; Ljiljana Jorgovanović; Marina Tucaković
Oliver Katić feat. Jelena Marković	"Predsedniče halo" (Председниче хало)	Goran Bregović; Ljiljana Jorgovanović; Marina Tucaković

==== Final ====
The final took place on 13 March 2010 where three songs competed. The winner, "Ovo je Balkan" performed by Milan Stanković, was decided exclusively by the Serbian public via SMS voting. Goran Bregović's Wedding and Funeral Orchestra, former Eurovision contestants Zdravko Čolić, who represented Yugoslavia in 1973, Severina, who represented Croatia in 2006, Marija Šerifović, who won the contest for Serbia in 2007, Jelena Tomašević, who represented Serbia in 2008, Marko Kon, who represented Serbia in 2009, Regina, who represented Bosnia in 2009 were featured as guest performers during the show.

Final – 13 March 2010
R/O	Artist	Song	Televote	Place
1	Emina Jahović	"Ti kvariigro"	49,706	2
2	Milan Stanković	"Ovo je Balkan"	58,428	1
3	Oliver Katić feat. Jelena Marković	"Predsedniče halo"	20,971	3

=== Preparation ===
Ahead of the contest, Stanković recorded a Spanish version of his contest entry, entitled "Balkañeros", which was released publicly on 11 April 2010.

== At Eurovision ==
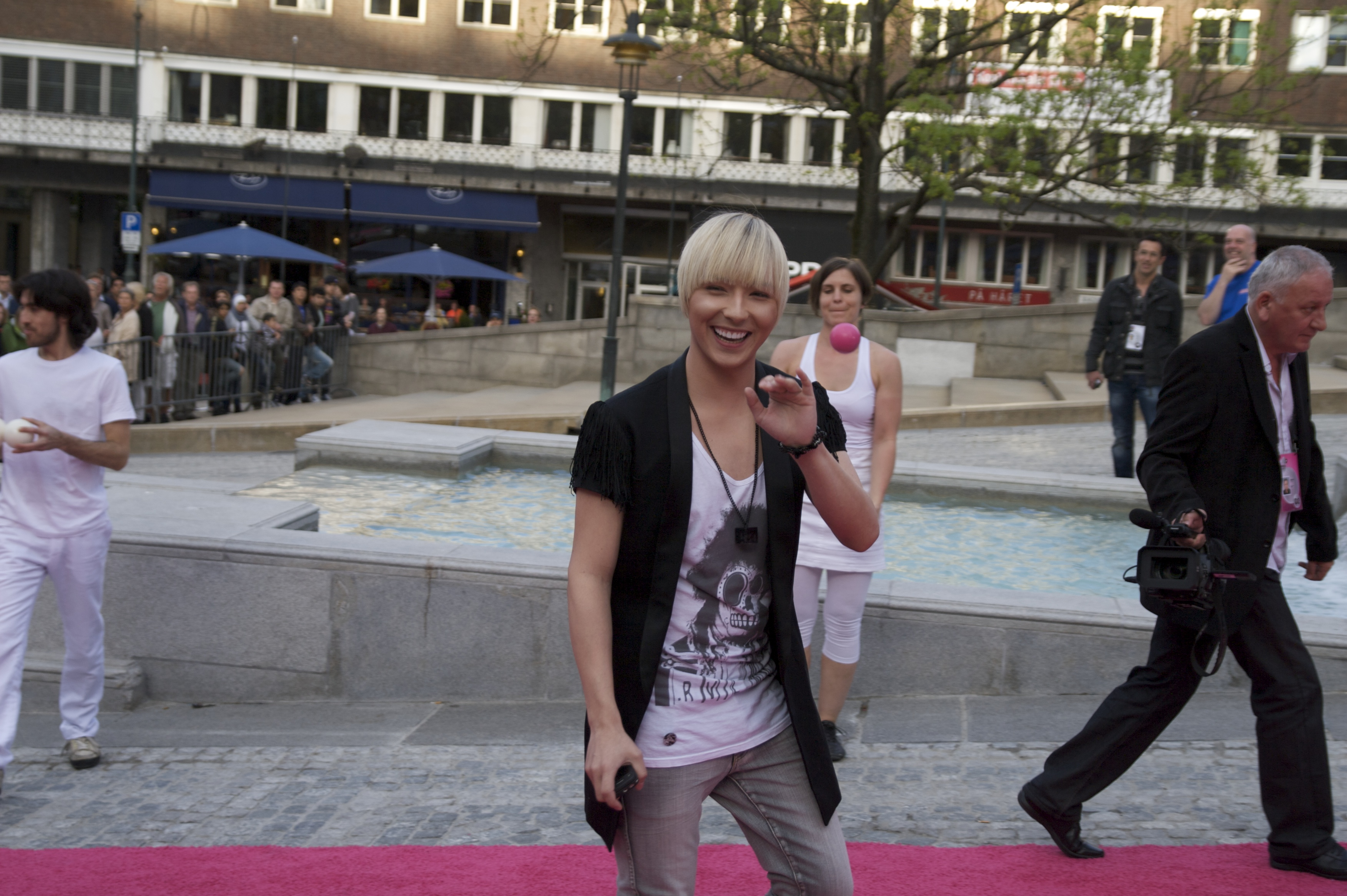
Milan Stanković at the Eurovision Opening Party in Oslo

According to Eurovision rules, all nations with the exceptions of the host country and the "Big Four" (France, Germany, Spain and the United Kingdom) are required to qualify from one of two semi-finals in order to compete for the final; the top ten countries from each semi-final progress to the final. The European Broadcasting Union (EBU) split up the competing countries into six different pots based on voting patterns from previous contests, with countries with favourable voting histories put into the same pot. On 7 February 2010, a special allocation draw was held which placed each country into one of the two semi-finals, as well as which half of the show they would perform in. Serbia was placed into the first semi-final, to be held on 25 May 2010, and was scheduled to perform in the first half of the show. The running order for the semi-finals was decided through another draw on 23 March 2010 and Serbia was set to perform in position 7, following the entry from Latvia and before the entry from Bosnia and Herzegovina.

The two semi-finals and the final were broadcast in Serbia on RTS 1 and RTS Sat with commentary for the second semi-final by Dragan Ilić and commentary for the first semi-final and final by Duška Vučinić-Lučić. The Serbian spokesperson, who announced the Serbian votes during the final, was Maja Nikolić.

=== Semi-final ===
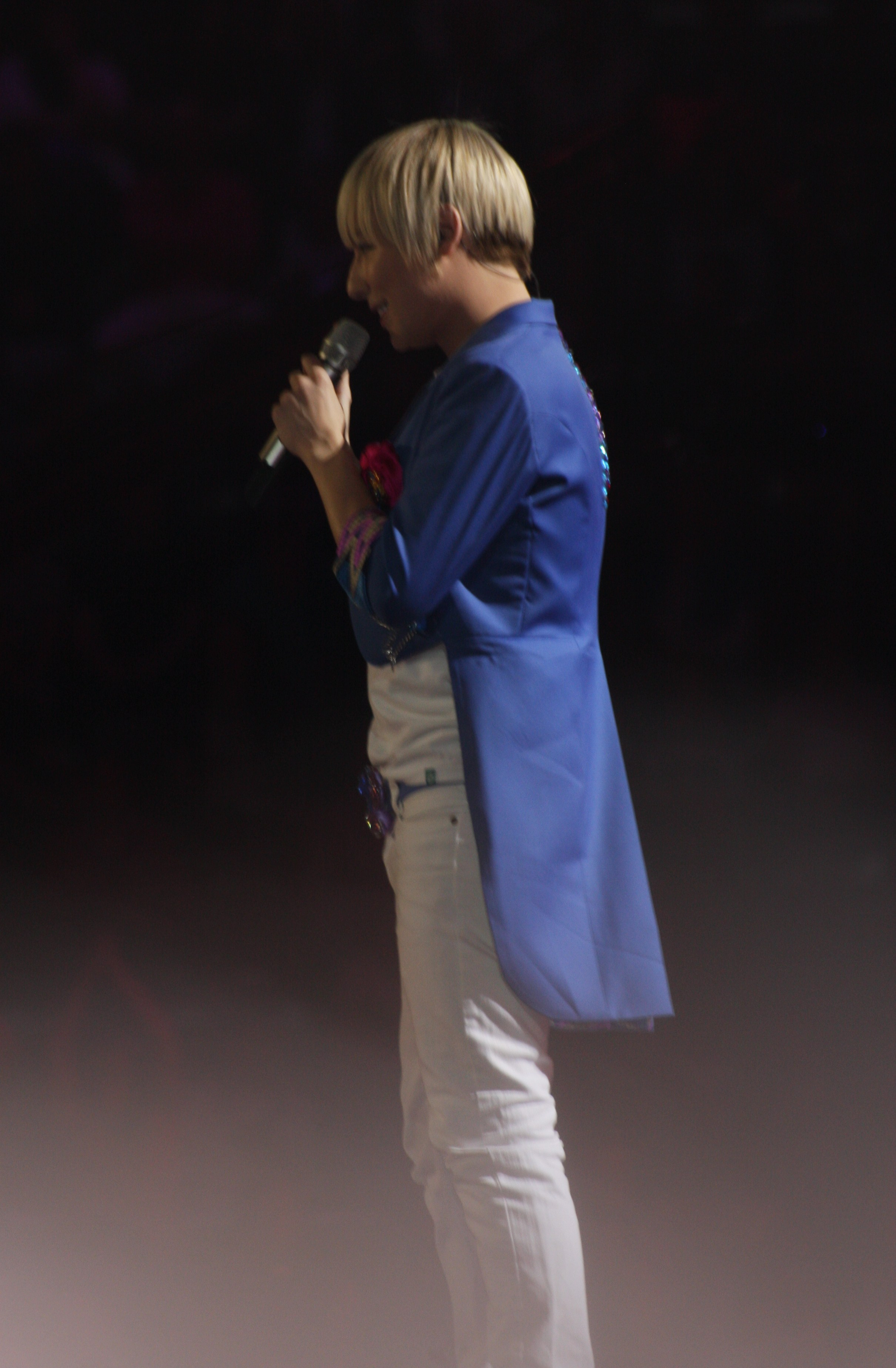
Milan Stanković during a rehearsal before the first semi-final

Milan Stanković took part in technical rehearsals on 16 and 20 May, followed by dress rehearsals on 24 and 25 May. This included the jury show on 24 May where the professional juries of each country watched and voted on the competing entries.

The Serbian performance featured Milan Stanković performing a choreographed routine in a blue jeweled outfit together with two male dancers in blue sequined outfits and two female backing vocalists in white dresses made out of bubble wrap. The performance began with Stanković and the dancers hiding behind half transparent screens on round podiums, which Stanković then appeared in front and joined by the backing performers. Silver bubbles were hanging from the ceiling with the stage lighting predominately displaying red colours. The performance also made use of the stage's silver bubbles and featured pyrotechnic effects. The two dancers that joined Milan Stanković on stage were: Aleksandar Jelenković and Marko Stojiljković, while the two backing vocalists were: Saška Janković and Zorica Brkić.

At the end of the show, Serbia was announced as having finished in the top 10 and subsequently qualifying for the grand final. It was later revealed that Serbia placed fifth in the semi-final, receiving a total of 72 points.

=== Final ===
Shortly after the first semi-final, a winners' press conference was held for the ten qualifying countries. As part of this press conference, the qualifying artists took part in a draw to determine the running order for the final. This draw was done in the order the countries were announced during the semi-final. Serbia was drawn to perform in position 8, following the entry from Belgium and before the entry from Belarus.

Milan Stanković once again took part in dress rehearsals on 28 and 29 May before the final, including the jury final where the professional juries cast their final votes before the live show. Milan Stanković performed a repeat of his semi-final performance during the final on 29 May. Serbia placed thirteenth in the final, scoring 72 points.

=== Voting ===
Voting during the three shows consisted of 50 percent public televoting and 50 percent from a jury deliberation. The jury consisted of five music industry professionals who were citizens of the country they represent. This jury was asked to judge each contestant based on: vocal capacity; the stage performance; the song's composition and originality; and the overall impression by the act. In addition, no member of a national jury could be related in any way to any of the competing acts in such a way that they cannot vote impartially and independently.

Following the release of the full split voting by the EBU after the conclusion of the competition, it was revealed that Serbia had placed tenth with the public televote and twenty-first with the jury vote in the final. In the public vote, Serbia scored 110 points, while with the jury vote, Serbia scored 37 points. In the first semi-final, Serbia placed fifth with the public televote with 92 points and eighth with the jury vote, scoring 65 points.

Below is a breakdown of points awarded to Serbia and awarded by Serbia in the first semi-final and grand final of the contest. The nation awarded its 12 points to Bosnia and Herzegovina in the semi-final and the final of the contest.

==== Points awarded to Serbia ====
Points awarded to Serbia (Semi-final 1)
Score	Country
12 points	Bosnia and Herzegovina; France
10 points	Macedonia
8 points	
7 points	Greece
6 points	Slovakia; Spain
5 points	
4 points	Germany; Russia
3 points	Albania; Belgium; Iceland; Latvia; Moldova
2 points	Portugal
1 point	Estonia

Points awarded to Serbia (Final)
Score	Country
12 points	Bosnia and Herzegovina
10 points	France; Switzerland
8 points	Croatia; Slovenia
7 points	Macedonia; Sweden
6 points	
5 points	Germany
4 points	
3 points	Albania
2 points	
1 point	Cyprus; Netherlands

==== Points awarded by Serbia ====
Points awarded by Serbia (Semi-final 1)
Score	Country
12 points	Bosnia and Herzegovina
10 points	Greece
8 points	Macedonia
7 points	Belgium
6 points	Slovakia
5 points	Portugal
4 points	Russia
3 points	Iceland
2 points	Albania
1 point	Moldova

Points awarded by Serbia (Final)
Score	Country
12 points	Bosnia and Herzegovina
10 points	Greece
8 points	Germany
7 points	Ukraine
6 points	Romania
5 points	Belgium
4 points	France
3 points	Turkey
2 points	Portugal
1 point	Armenia
