= Gjoko Taneski =

Macedonian singer (born 1977)

Gjoko Taneski Ѓоко Танески
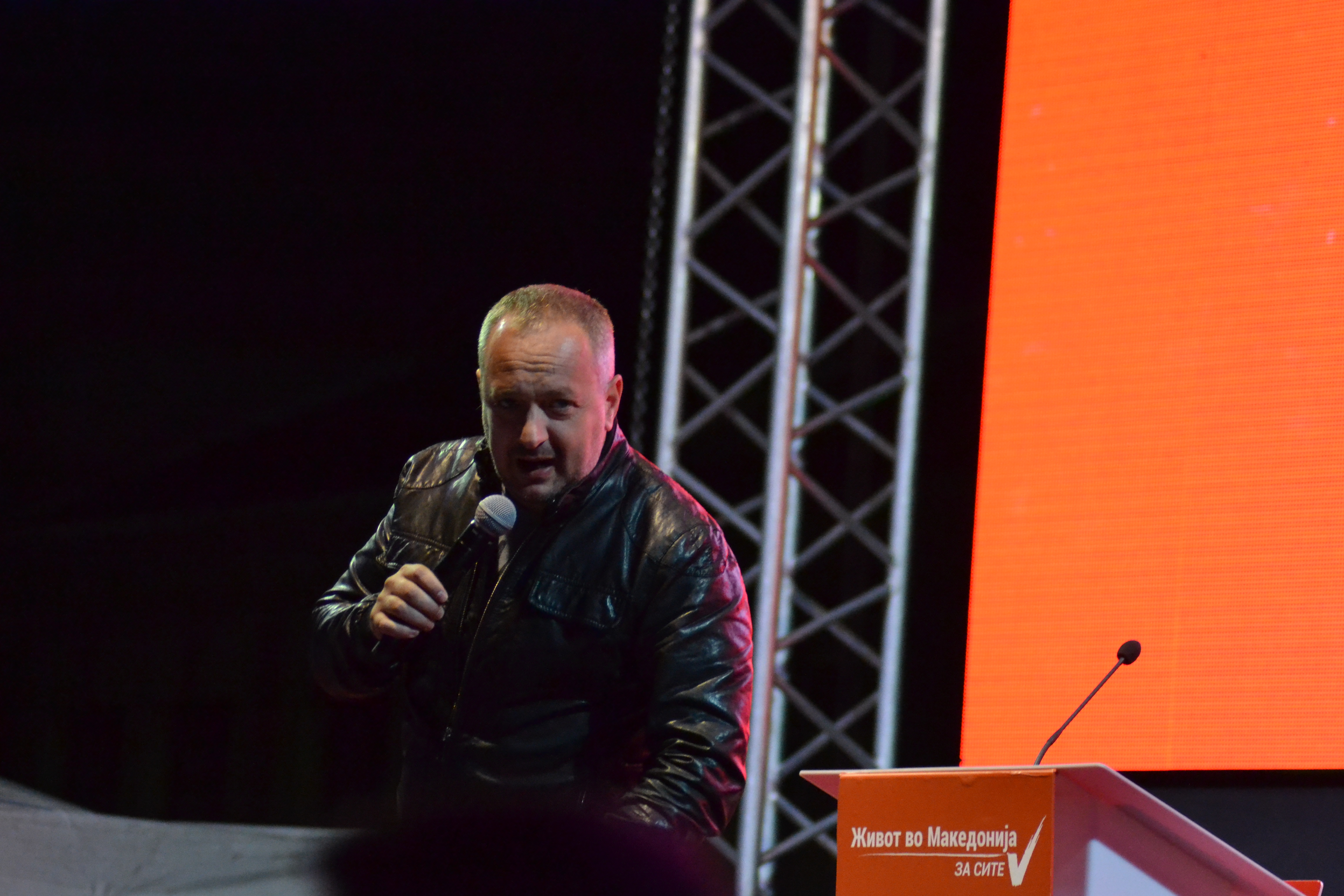

Background information
- Born: 2 March 1977 (age 49); Belčišta, Socialist Federal Republic of Yugoslavia
- Origin: North Macedonia
- Genres: Pop, rock
- Occupation: Singer
- Instrument: Vocals
- Years active: 1996–present

Gjoko Taneski (Macedonian: Ѓоко Танески) (born 2 March 1977) is a Macedonian singer.

Taneski was born in Belčišta, SR Macedonia, SFR Yugoslavia. He won the national final for the Eurovision Song Contest 2010, after which he represented Macedonia with the song "Jas ja imam silata" at the Eurovision Song Contest 2010.

== Eurovision 2010 ==
On 20 February 2010, Taneski won the Macedonian national final and represented North Macedonia in the Eurovision Song Contest 2010 with the song "Jas ja imam silata", performing it in the first semi-final held on 25 May 2010 in Oslo, Norway. It failed to qualify for the final and finished in 15th place in the semi-final with 37 points.

== Discography ==
=== Albums ===
- Zbogum Najmila (Farewell Dearest) (2007)
- Nikogaš Dosta (Never Enough) (2009).

Awards and achievements
Preceded by Next Time with Nešto što kje ostane	Macedonia in the Eurovision Song Contest (with Billy Zver and Pejčin); 2010	Succeeded by Vlatko Ilievski with Rusinka
