= Romania in the Eurovision Song Contest 2010 =

- Eurovision Song Contest 2010
- Participating broadcaster: Televiziunea Română (TVR)
- Country: Romania
- Selection process: Selecţia Naţională 2010
- Selection date: 6 March 2010

Competing entry
- Song: "Playing with Fire"
- Artist: Paula Seling and Ovi
- Songwriters: Ovidiu Cernăuțeanu

Placement
- Semi-final result: Qualified (4th, 104 points)
- Final result: 3rd, 162 points

Participation chronology

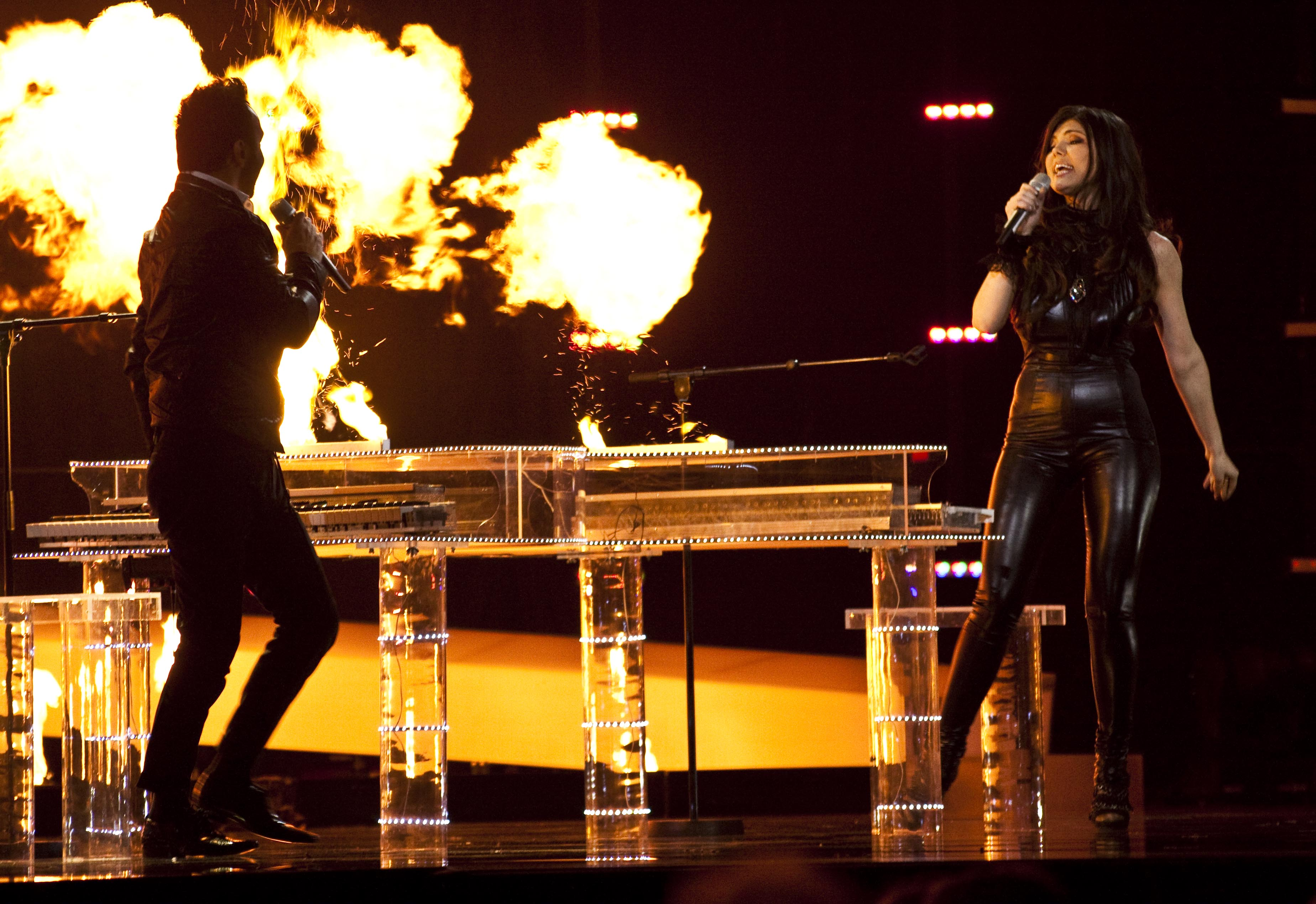

Romania was represented at the Eurovision Song Contest 2010 with the song "Playing with Fire", written by Ovidiu Cernăuțeanu, and performed by Paula Seling and Cernăuțeanu under his stage name Ovi. The Romanian participating broadcaster, Televiziunea Română (TVR), organised the national final Selecția Națională 2010 in order to select its entry for the contest. Sixteen entries were selected to compete in the national final on 6 March 2010 where "Playing with Fire" performed by Paula Seling and Ovi was selected as the winner after scoring top marks from five regional juries and a public televote.

Romania was drawn to compete in the second semi-final of the Eurovision Song Contest which took place on 27 May 2010. Performing during the show in position 10, "Playing with Fire" was announced among the top 10 entries of the second semi-final and therefore qualified to compete in the final on 29 May. It was later revealed that Romania placed fourth out of the 17 participating countries in the semi-final with 104 points. In the final, Romania performed in position 19 and placed third out of the 25 participating countries, scoring 162 points. This, alongside its 2005 entry, the country's best result in the contest.

== Background ==
Prior to the 2010 contest, contest, Televiziunea Română (TVR) had participated in the Eurovision Song Contest representing Romania eleven times since its first entry in 1994. To this point, its highest placing in the contest has been third place, achieved in 2005 with the song "Let Me Try" performed by Luminița Anghel and Sistem. To this point, Romania has qualified to the final on every occasion since the introduction of semi-finals to the format of the contest in 2004. In 2009, "The Balkan Girls" by Elena placed 19th in the final.

As part of its duties as participating broadcaster, TVR organises the selection of its entry in the Eurovision Song Contest and broadcasts the event in the country. The broadcaster has consistently selected its entry through national finals that feature a competition among several artists and songs. TVR confirmed its intentions to participate at the 2010 contest on 6 October 2009. TVR had set up national finals with several artists to choose both the song and performer, a procedure which the broadcaster opted for once again to select its 2010 entry.

== Before Eurovision ==
=== Selecția Națională 2010 ===
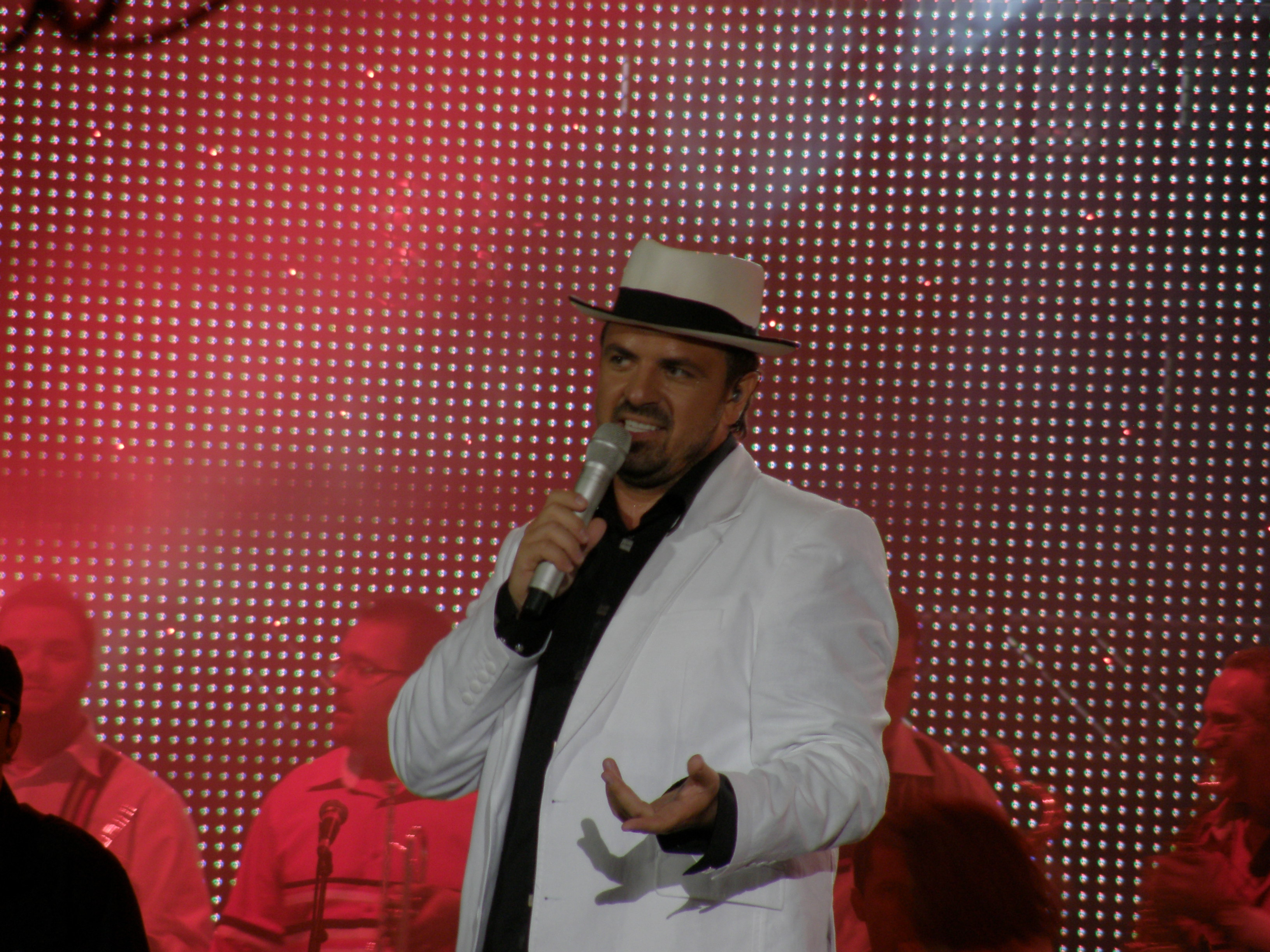
Singer Horia Brenciu (pictured in 2008) was one of the hosts of the Selecția Națională 2010 final.

Upon confirming their participation in the Eurovision Song Contest 2010 on 3 November 2009, TVR organized Selecția Națională 2010, a competition to select their entrant. Newspaper Adevărul sponsored the event. On 25 January 2010, the broadcaster published a provisory list of 16 finalists chosen by a jury panel from 25 to 27 January, out of 111 eligible entries submitted between 9 December 2009 and 14 January 2010. TVR eventually unveiled the jury's scores, which revealed that—although a maximum of 15 finalists had been originally scheduled—16 were ultimately announced due to several ties. Previously, the broadcaster had collaborated with around 40 high-profile Romanian composers to create a list of "the best voices of the country"; songwriters aiming to compete in Selecția Națională were strongly recommended to consider one of the 54 shortlisted artists when submitting their songs. The jury analysing the entries had the right to recommend that a new singer be brought up for a submission; in this case, the composer was offered the possibility to rerecord their song with another artist using TVR's recording studio.

Similarly to the 2009 selection, no foreign composers were allowed to participate in Selecția Națională. Furthermore, a new rule introduced in December 2009 stated that it was not permitted for the submissions to have been performed or sent to radio and television stations prior to the date TVR announced the contest's finalists. Antena 3 writer Dana Cobuz speculated that this led to the disqualification of several entries intended for the national selection, including "My Love on You" by Anda Adam. Other reports mentioned ineligible entries by artists such as Blaxy Girls, Marcel Pavel and Xonia. The final of Selecția Națională was held on 6 March at the Bucharest Metropolitan Circus, and was hosted by Horia Brenciu and Valentina Pelinel alongside green room presenter Gianina Corodan. Eurovision Song Contest 2000 winners Olsen Brothers were hired as the interval act. Prior to this, the competing entries were promoted by music videos broadcast by TVR. The final results were determined by a 50/50 combination of votes from a jury panel and a public televote. For "an even greater national representation", 25% of the jury vote were made up by a Bucharest panel, and the rest by the overall result of four regional juries in Cluj-Napoca, Craiova, Iași and Timișoara. The winning entry was also awarded a SEAT Ibiza car.

Competing entries (Source:)
| Artist | Song | Songwriter(s) | Points |
|---|---|---|---|
| Hotel FM (Note: TVR announced Hotel FM as the song's interpreters on 6 February. Initially, the submitted version of "Come as One" was only credited to the group's lead singer, David Brian.) | "Come as One" | Alexandra Ivan; Gabriel Băruță | 97 |
| Paula Seling and Kamara | "It's Not Too Late" | Andreea Andrei; Kamara; Andrei Tudor | 97 |
| Lulu and the Puppets (Note: TVR announced Lulu and the Puppets as the song's interpreters on 6 February. On its original submission, "Searching for Perfect Emotion" was credited to David Brian, the lead singer of Hotel FM.) | "Searching for Perfect Emotion" | Vlad Crețu | 93 |
| Pasager | "Running Out of Time" | Ovidiu Anton; Daniel Bouroșu | 90 |
| Lucia Dumitrescu (Note: TVR announced Lucia Dumitrescu as the song's interpreter on 6 February. The originally submitted version of "See You In Heaven, Michael" was credited to its composer Mircea Romescu.) | "See You In Heaven, Michael" | Mircea Romcescu | 89 |
| Paula Seling and Ovi | "Playing with Fire" | Ovidiu Cernăuțeanu | 89 |
| Răzvan Krivach (Note: The song was initially credited to Crivaci.) | "Jack Pott" | Răzvan Krivach; Anca Mariaș; Tudor Rogoz; Gia Șandru | 88 |
| Lora and Sonny Flame (Note: The song was initially credited to their real names, Laura Petrescu and Mihai Preda, respectively.) | "Come Along" | Lora; Sonny Flame; Paul Turcu; Bogdan Vlăsceanu | 88 |
| Cătălin Josan | "Around Around" | Cătălin Josan | 85 |
| Alexandra Ungureanu | "Crazy" | Sandy Deac; Alexandra Ungureanu | 83 |
| Tina G. | "Love Is War" | Keo | 82 |
| Dalma Kovács | "I'm Running" | Cornel Ilie | 81 |
| Luminița Anghel, Tony Tomas and Adrian Piper | "Save Their Lives" | Melinda Bartas; Eduard Cîrcotă | 80 |
| Anda Adam and Connect-R (Note: TVR announced Connect-R as one of the song's interpreters on 6 February) | "Surrender" | Răzvan Matache; Zoltan Pop | 79 |
| Alexa (Note: TVR announced Alexa as the song's interpreter on 6 February. On its original submission, "Baby" was credited to Maria Sanchez.) | "Baby" | Mihai Alexandru | 79 |
| Zero | "Lay Me Down" | Zero | 79 |

Final – 6 March 2010
| R/O | Artist | Song | Jury | | Televote | | Total | Place |
| R/O | Artist | Song | Votes | Points | Votes | Points | Total | Place |
|---|---|---|---|---|---|---|---|---|
| 1 | Răzvan Krivach | "Jack Pott" | 8 | 5 | 4,621 | 0 | 5 | 10 |
| 2 | Luminiţa Anghel, Tony Tomas and Adrian Piper | "Save Their Lives" | 9 | 6 | 10,620 | 10 | 16 | 2 |
| 3 | Paula Seling and Ovi | "Playing with Fire" | 24 | 12 | 23,412 | 12 | 24 | 1 |
| 4 | Dalma Kovács | "I'm Running" | 0 | 0 | 5,072 | 1 | 1 | 11 |
| 5 | Alexandra Ungureanu | "Crazy" | 4 | 1 | 3,823 | 0 | 1 | 12 |
| 6 | Pasager | "Running Out of Time" | 1 | 0 | 2,698 | 0 | 0 | 15 |
| 7 | Lora and Sonny Flame | "Come Along" | 6 | 4 | 10,503 | 7 | 11 | 6 |
| 8 | Hotel FM | "Come as One" | 20 | 10 | 7,515 | 4 | 14 | 4 |
| 9 | Zero | "Lay Me Down" | 4 | 2 | 5,720 | 3 | 5 | 8 |
| 10 | Lucia Dumitrescu | "See You In Heaven, Michael" | 2 | 0 | 3,449 | 0 | 0 | 14 |
| 11 | Paula Seling and Kamara | "It's Not Too Late" | 15 | 7 | 8,207 | 6 | 13 | 5 |
| 12 | Lulu and the Puppets | "Searching for Perfect Emotion" | 0 | 0 | 4,232 | 0 | 0 | 16 |
| 13 | Anda Adam and Connect-R | "Surrender" | 0 | 0 | 7,533 | 5 | 5 | 7 |
| 14 | Tina G. | "Love Is War" | 2 | 0 | 3,543 | 0 | 0 | 13 |
| 15 | Alexa | "Baby" | 6 | 3 | 5,168 | 2 | 5 | 9 |
| 16 | Cătălin Josan | "Around Around" | 15 | 8 | 10,515 | 8 | 16 | 3 |

Detailed jury voting
| R/O | Song | Regional juries | | | | | | Bucharest jury | | Total |
| R/O | Song | Craiova | Cluj-Napoca | Iaşi | Timișoara | Total | Points | Total | Points | Total |
|---|---|---|---|---|---|---|---|---|---|---|
| 1 | "Jack Pott" | 0 | 5 | 38 | 27 | 70 | 5 | 33 | 3 | 8 |
| 2 | "Save Their Lives" | 11 | 8 | 34 | 0 | 53 | 3 | 56 | 6 | 9 |
| 3 | "Playing with Fire" | 60 | 60 | 37 | 32 | 189 | 12 | 120 | 12 | 24 |
| 4 | "I'm Running" | 3 | 0 | 2 | 4 | 9 | 0 | 3 | 0 | 0 |
| 5 | "Crazy" | 18 | 12 | 18 | 18 | 66 | 4 | 19 | 0 | 4 |
| 6 | "Running Out of Time" | 9 | 0 | 5 | 13 | 27 | 0 | 21 | 1 | 1 |
| 7 | "Come Along" | 1 | 18 | 22 | 2 | 43 | 1 | 39 | 5 | 6 |
| 8 | "Come as One" | 46 | 32 | 36 | 46 | 160 | 10 | 104 | 10 | 20 |
| 9 | "Lay Me Down" | 0 | 11 | 9 | 15 | 35 | 0 | 35 | 4 | 4 |
| 10 | "See You In Heaven, Michael" | 28 | 0 | 3 | 1 | 32 | 0 | 26 | 2 | 2 |
| 11 | "It's Not Too Late" | 30 | 46 | 24 | 48 | 148 | 8 | 63 | 7 | 15 |
| 12 | "Searching for Perfect Emotion" | 4 | 6 | 14 | 14 | 38 | 0 | 19 | 0 | 0 |
| 13 | "Surrender" | 5 | 0 | 0 | 7 | 12 | 0 | 13 | 0 | 0 |
| 14 | "Love Is War" | 11 | 20 | 2 | 20 | 53 | 2 | 1 | 0 | 2 |
| 15 | "Baby" | 40 | 37 | 10 | 0 | 87 | 6 | 16 | 0 | 6 |
| 16 | "Around Around" | 20 | 35 | 36 | 44 | 135 | 7 | 70 | 8 | 15 |

==== Controversies ====
During his appearance on a TVR talkshow prior to the Selecția Națională final, Adevărul's director of communications Alexandru Catalan stated that he "hope[d] Luminița Anghel [would] achieve a better placement [at the Eurovision Song Contest 2010] in Oslo in May than she did [in 2005]"; this led observers to believe that the national selection competition was rigged. Anghel dismissed the claims soon after. The singer's eventual final performance was criticized for causing the death of several butterflies. In March 2010, speculations surfaced that Simen M. Eriksrud—who is not of Romanian origin or citizenship—was one of the composers of the winning entry "Playing with Fire" by Paula Seling and Ovi, which was not permitted per Selecția Națională rules. However, Ovi denied the accusations, confirming that Eriksrud solely produced the track and was given half of its copyrights after its registration at the Norwegian copyright corporation TONO.

=== Promotion ===
Paula Seling and Ovi made several appearances across Europe to specifically promote "Playing with Fire" as the Romanian Eurovision entry. In March and April, Paula Seling and Ovi took part in promotional activities in Belgium, Bulgaria, Greece, Macedonia, Moldova and Portugal where they made radio and television appearances. Due to the 2010 eruptions of the Eyjafjallajökull volcano in Iceland which led to the closure of Norwegian airspace, promotional activities in Bulgaria and Macedonia were done by Paula Seling alone. On 23 April, Paula Seling and Ovi took part in promotional activities in Turkey where they appeared during the Kanal D talk show Beyaz Show and the special TRT show Eurovision 2010'a dogru. On 2 May, Paula Seling and Ovi performed during the London Eurovision Party, which was held at the Shadow Lounge venue in London, United Kingdom and hosted by Nicki French and Paddy O'Connell. In addition to their international appearances, Paula Seling and Ovi also completed promotional activities in Romania where they performed "Playing with Fire" during the RRA Awards 2010 on 14 March and during a special concert which was held at the Enjoy Pub in Botoşani on 30 March.

== At Eurovision ==
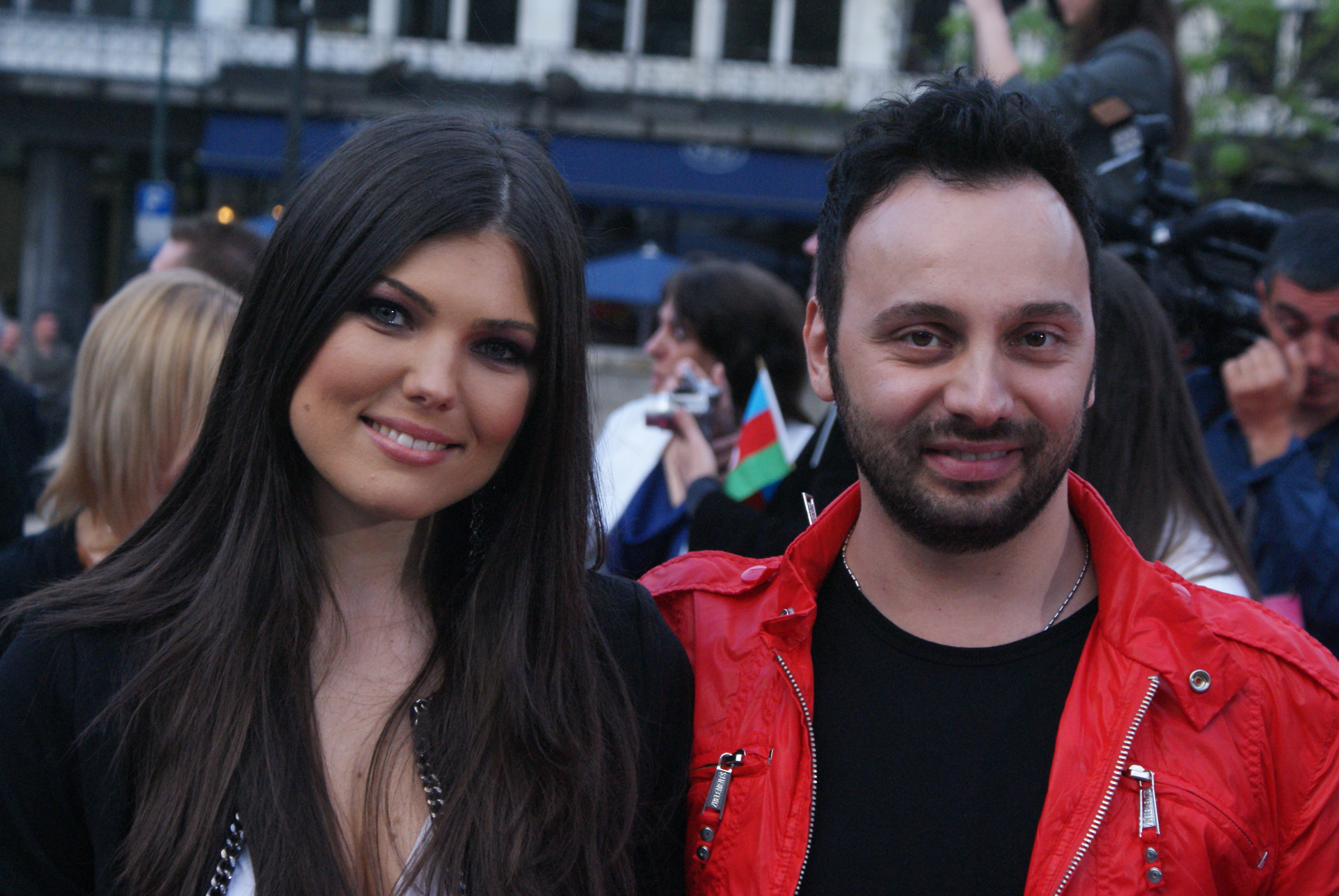
Paula Seling and Ovi at the Eurovision Opening Party in Oslo

According to Eurovision rules, all nations with the exceptions of the host country and the "Big Four" (France, Germany, Spain and the United Kingdom) were required to qualify from one of two semi-finals in order to compete for the final; the top ten countries from each semi-final progress to the final. The European Broadcasting Union (EBU) split up the competing countries into six different pots based on voting patterns from previous contests, with countries with favourable voting histories put into the same pot. On 7 February 2010, a special allocation draw was held which placed each country into one of the two semi-finals, as well as which half of the show they would perform in. Romania was placed into the second semi-final, to be held on 27 May 2010, and was scheduled to perform in the second half of the show. The running order for the semi-finals was decided through another draw on 23 March 2010 and Romania was set to perform in position 10, following the entry from Netherlands and before the entry from Slovenia.

All three shows were broadcast in Romania on TVR1, TVRi and TVR HD with commentary by Leonard Miron and Gianina Corondan. The Romanian spokesperson, who announced the Romanian votes during the final, was Malvina Cservenschi.

=== Semi-final ===
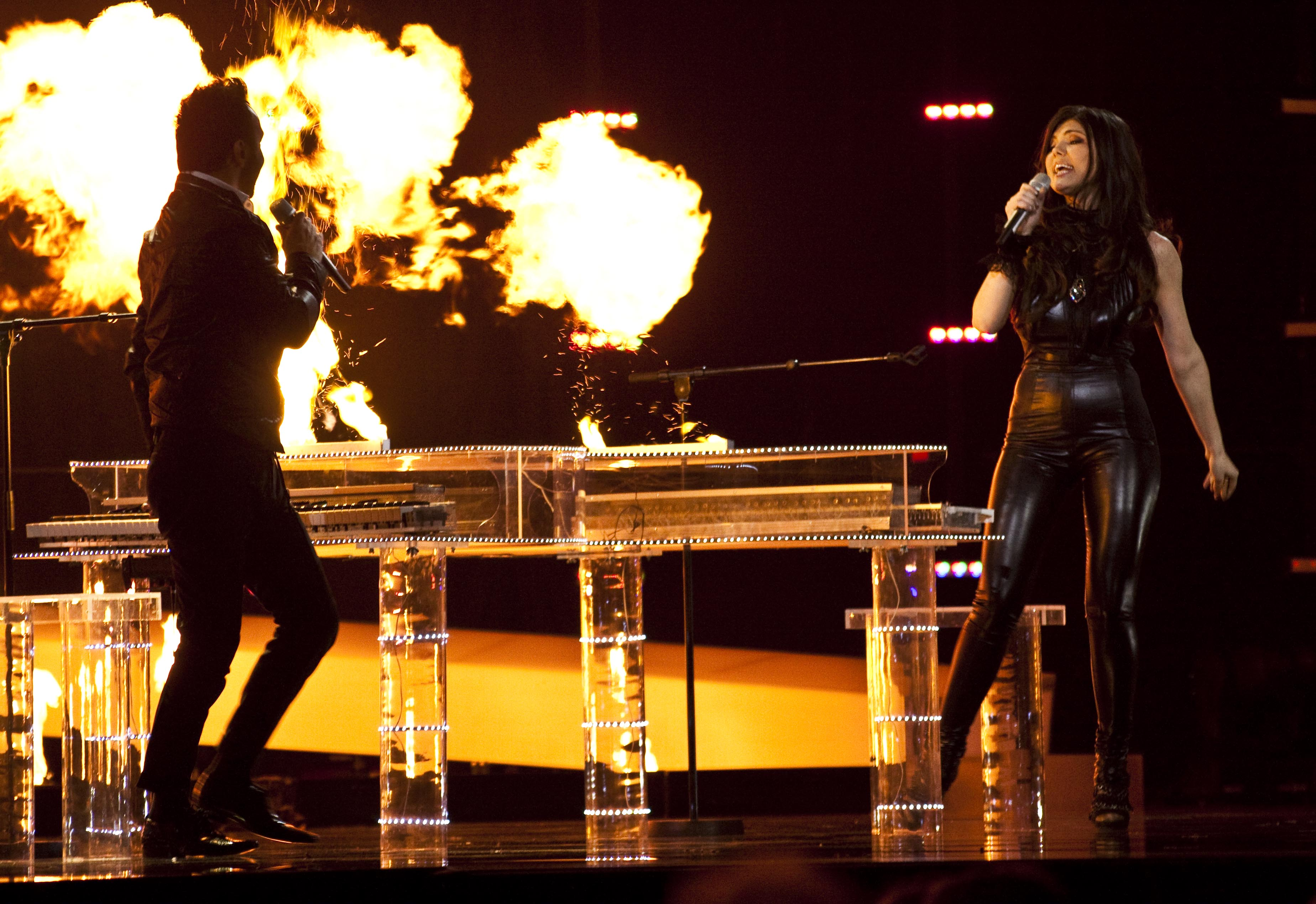
Paula Seling and Ovi during a rehearsal before the second semi-final

Paula Seling and Ovi took part in technical rehearsals on 19 and 22 May, followed by dress rehearsals on 26 and 27 May. This included the jury show on 26 May where the professional juries of each country watched and voted on the competing entries.

The stage show featured Paula Seling and Ovi both dressed in black outfits and playing a shine-through double piano enhanced by white LEDs and pyrotechnic flame effects handheld by the singers which were also used at the back part of the stage, with four backing vocalists being placed on the left part of the stage. The stage lighting transitioned from blue to orange colours with the words "Girl" and "Boy" being displayed on the backdrop. At the end of the performance, both singers left their piano positions and moved to the front part of the stage. The four backing vocalists that joined Paula Seling and Ovi on stage were Alexandra Crăescu, Andrada Suliman, Bianca Purcărea and Oana Pușcatu.

At the end of the show, Romania was announced as having finished in the top ten and subsequently qualifying for the grand final. It was later revealed that Romania placed fourth in the semi-final, receiving a total of 104 points.

=== Final ===
Shortly after the second semi-final, a winners' press conference was held for the ten qualifying countries. As part of this press conference, the qualifying artists took part in a draw to determine the running order for the final. This draw was done in the order the countries were announced during the semi-final. Romania was drawn to perform in position 19, following the entry from France and before the entry from Russia.

Paula Seling and Ovi once again took part in dress rehearsals on 28 and 29 May before the final, including the jury final where the professional juries cast their final votes before the live show. The duet performed a repeat of their semi-final performance during the final on 29 May. At the conclusion of the voting, Romania finished in third place with 162 points. This equalled the country's best result from 2005.

=== Voting ===
Voting during the three shows consisted of 50 percent public televoting and 50 percent from a jury deliberation. The jury consisted of five music industry professionals who were citizens of the country they represent. This jury was asked to judge each contestant based on: vocal capacity; the stage performance; the song's composition and originality; and the overall impression by the act. In addition, no member of a national jury could be related in any way to any of the competing acts in such a way that they cannot vote impartially and independently.

Following the release of the full split voting by the EBU after the conclusion of the competition, it was revealed that Romania had placed sixth with the public televote and third with the jury vote in the final. In the public vote, Romania scored 155 points, while with the jury vote, Romania scored 167 points. In the second semi-final, Romania placed third with the public televote with 113 points and eighth with the jury vote, scoring 80 points.

Below is a breakdown of points awarded to Romania and awarded by Romania in the second semi-final and grand final of the contest. The nation awarded its 12 points to Denmark in the semi-final and the final of the contest.

==== Points awarded to Romania ====
Points awarded to Romania (Semi-final 2)
| Score | Country |
|---|---|
| 12 points | United Kingdom |
| 10 points | Norway |
| 8 points | Cyprus; Denmark; Israel; Turkey |
| 7 points | Sweden |
| 6 points | Ireland; Lithuania |
| 5 points | Azerbaijan |
| 4 points | Armenia; Bulgaria; Georgia; Slovenia; Switzerland |
| 3 points | Netherlands; Ukraine |
| 2 points | |
| 1 point | |

Points awarded to Romania (Final)
| Score | Country |
|---|---|
| 12 points | Moldova |
| 10 points | Norway; Portugal; Spain; Sweden |
| 8 points | Cyprus; Denmark; Israel; United Kingdom |
| 7 points | Azerbaijan; Ireland; Slovenia |
| 6 points | Poland; Serbia |
| 5 points | Albania; Iceland; Malta; Netherlands |
| 4 points | Greece; Switzerland |
| 3 points | Latvia; Russia |
| 2 points | Bosnia and Herzegovina; Lithuania; Turkey; Ukraine |
| 1 point | Armenia; Belarus; Slovakia |

==== Points awarded by Romania ====
Points awarded by Romania (Semi-final 2)
| Score | Country |
|---|---|
| 12 points | Denmark |
| 10 points | Armenia |
| 8 points | Azerbaijan |
| 7 points | Turkey |
| 6 points | Cyprus |
| 5 points | Ukraine |
| 4 points | Ireland |
| 3 points | Israel |
| 2 points | Georgia |
| 1 point | Sweden |

Points awarded by Romania (Final)
| Score | Country |
|---|---|
| 12 points | Denmark |
| 10 points | Moldova |
| 8 points | Turkey |
| 7 points | Greece |
| 6 points | Armenia |
| 5 points | Ukraine |
| 4 points | Belgium |
| 3 points | Germany |
| 2 points | Spain |
| 1 point | Albania |

== See also ==
- List of music released by Romanian artists that has charted in major music markets
