= Billy Zver =

Billy Zver Били Sвер
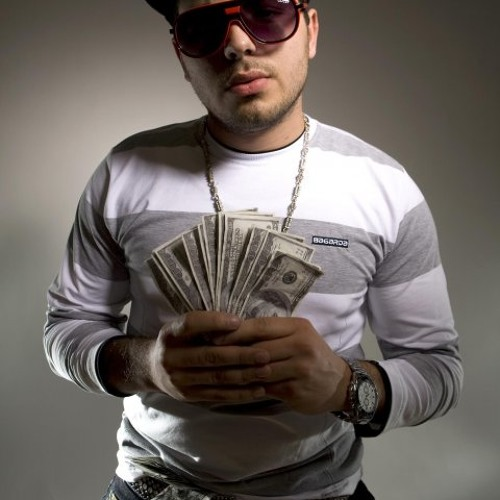

Background information
- Born: Ilija Delov; June 26, 1987 (age 39); Kavadarci, SR Macedonia, SFR Yugoslavia) (present-day North Macedonia)
- Genres: Rap Pop
- Occupation: Rapper
- Years active: 2006–Today

Ilija Delov, known by his stage name Billy Zver (born 1987) is a Macedonian rapper who, together with Gjoko Taneski, represented Macedonia in the Eurovision Song Contest 2010 with the song "Jas ja imam silata".
