= Spain in the Eurovision Song Contest 2010 =

- Eurovision Song Contest 2010
- Participating broadcaster: Radiotelevisión Española (RTVE)
- Country: Spain
- Selection process: Destino Oslo, La Gala de Eurovisión 2010
- Selection date: 22 February 2010

Competing entry
- Song: "Algo pequeñito"
- Artist: Daniel Diges
- Songwriters: Jesús Cañadilla; Luis Miguel de la Varga; Alberto Jodar; Daniel Diges

Placement
- Final result: 15th, 68 points

Participation chronology

Spain was represented at the Eurovision Song Contest 2010 with the song "Algo pequeñito", written by Jesús Cañadilla, Luis Miguel de la Varga, Alberto Jodar, and Daniel Diges, and performed by Daniel Diges himself. The Spanish participating broadcaster, Radiotelevisión Española (RTVE), organised the national final Destino Oslo, La Gala de Eurovisión 2010 in order to select its entry for the contest. Ten artists and songs selected through an Internet public vote competed in the televised show where an in-studio jury and a public televote selected "Algo pequeñito" performed by Daniel Diges as the winner.

As a member of the "Big Four", Spain automatically qualified to compete in the final of the Eurovision Song Contest. Performing in position 2, Spain placed fifteenth out of the 25 participating countries with 68 points.

== Background ==
Prior to the 2010 contest, Televisión Española (TVE) until 2006, and Radiotelevisión Española (RTVE) since 2007, had participated in the Eurovision Song Contest representing Spain forty-nine times since TVE's first entry in 1961. They have won the contest on two occasions: in 1968 with the song "La, la, la" performed by Massiel and in 1969 with the song "Vivo cantando" performed by Salomé, the latter having won in a four-way tie with France, the Netherlands, and the United Kingdom. They have also finished second four times, with "En un mundo nuevo" by Karina in 1971, "Eres tú" by Mocedades in 1973, "Su canción" by Betty Missiego in 1979, and "Vuelve conmigo" by Anabel Conde in 1995. In 2009, RTVE placed twenty-fourth with the song "La noche es para mí" performed by Soraya.

As part of its duties as participating broadcaster, RTVE organises the selection of its entry in the Eurovision Song Contest and broadcasts the event in the country. RTVE confirmed its intentions to participate at the 2010 contest on 23 November 2009. From 2007 to 2009, RTVE organised a national final featuring a competition among several artists and songs to select both the artist and song that would represent Spain, a procedure which was continued for their 2010 entry.

== Before Eurovision ==
=== Destino Oslo, La Gala de Eurovisión 2010 ===
Destino Oslo, La Gala de Eurovisión 2010 was the national final organised by RTVE that took place on 22 February 2010 at its Estudios Buñuel in Madrid, hosted by Anne Igartiburu with Ainhoa Arbizu acting as the green room host. The show was broadcast on La 1, TVE Internacional, as well as online via RTVE's official website rtve.es. Ten artists and songs, selected through an Internet round titled ¡Tu país te necesita! 2010, competed with the winner being decided upon through a combination of public televoting and an in-studio expert jury. The national final was watched by 2.63 million viewers in Spain with a market share of 15.6%.

==== ¡Tu país te necesita! ====
A submission period was open from 4 December 2010 until 12 January 2010. At the conclusion of the submission period, 480 entries were received, of which 313 were selected for an Internet vote. The selected entries were revealed via RTVE's official website on 18 January 2010 and users had until 5 February 2010 to submit up to five votes for their favourite entries per day. 5,722,596 votes were received at the conclusion of the voting and the top ten entries that qualified for the national final were announced on 8 February 2010. Among the competing artists was former Eurovision entrant Anabel Conde, who represented Spain in 1995.

¡Tu país te necesita! – 8 February 2010
Artist	Song	Songwriter(s)	Votes	Place
Ainhoa Cantalapiedra	"Volveré"	José Juan Santana; Rafael Artesero; Ainhoa Cantalapiedra	176,912	10
Anabel Conde	"Sin miedos"	Rafael Artesero	182,528	8
Coral Segovia	"En una vida"	Tony Sánchez-Ohlsson; Thomas G:son; Andreas Rickstrand	292,522	1
Daniel Diges	"Algo pequeñito"	Jesús Cañadilla; Luis Miguel de la Varga; Alberto Jodar; Daniel Diges	187,391	5
Fran Dieli	"Cuando se trata de ti"	Fran Dieli; Antonio Raúl Fernández; Javier Molina	187,213	6
John Cobra	"Carol"	John Cobra	269,919	2
José Galisteo	"Beautiful Life"	Jesús María Pérez; Tony Sánchez-Ohlsson	180,145	9
Lorena	"Amor mágico"	Alejandro de Pinedo; Roza Ruiz	188,778	3
Samuel and Patricia	"Recuérdame"	Jesús María Pérez; Tony Sánchez-Ohlsson	188,470	4
Venus	"Perfecta"	Tony Sánchez-Ohlsson; Thomas G:son; Andreas Rickstrand	183,753	7

==== National final ====
The televised final, presented by Anne Igartiburu, took place on 22 February 2010. The winner, "Algo pequeñito" performed by Daniel Diges, was selected through the combination of the votes of an in-studio jury (50%) and a public televote (50%). In addition to the performances of the competing entries, guest performers included David Bustamante and former Eurovision entrants Sergio Dalma, who represented Spain in 1991, and Rosa López, who represented Spain in 2002.

The five members of the in-studio jury that evaluated the entries during the final were:

- Manuel Bandera – Actor and dancer
- José María Íñigo – Journalist, actor and television presenter
- Toni Garrido – Journalist at RNE
- Mariola Orellana – Music producer
- Pilar Tabares – Music director of TVE

Destino Oslo, La Gala de Eurovisión 2010 – 22 February 2010
R/O	Artist	Song	Jury	Televote	Total	Place
1	Venus	"Perfecta"	24	30	54	4
2	Ainhoa Cantalapiedra	"Volveré"	24	25	49	6
3	Fran Dieli	"Cuando se trata de ti"	19	5	24	9
4	Lorena	"Amor mágico"	37	40	77	3
5	Samuel and Patricia	"Recuérdame"	30	20	50	5
6	José Galisteo	"Beautiful Life"	14	35	49	7
7	John Cobra	"Carol"	5	10	15	10
8	Anabel Conde	"Sin miedos"	32	15	47	8
9	Daniel Diges	"Algo pequeñito"	58	60	118	1
10	Coral Segovia	"En una vida"	47	50	97	2

Detailed Jury Votes
R/O	Song	T. Garrido	M. Orellana	J.M. Íñigo	P. Tabares	M. Bandera	Total
1	"Perfecta"	5	4	6	4	5	24
2	"Volveré"	4	3	7	6	4	24
3	"Cuando se trata de ti"	6	5	2	3	3	19
4	"Amor mágico"	10	10	3	7	7	37
5	"Recuérdame"	2	7	8	5	8	30
6	"Beautiful Life"	3	2	5	2	2	14
7	"Carol"	1	1	1	1	1	5
8	"Sin miedos"	8	6	4	8	6	32
9	"Algo pequeñito"	12	12	12	10	12	58
10	"En una vida"	7	8	10	12	10	47

=== Controversy ===
During the voting of ¡Tu país te necesita!, eight entries were disqualified due to breaking competition rules, which included songs from Chimo Bayo, El Pezón Rojo and Pop Star Queen, who were among the top three prior to their respective disqualifications. In protest of Bayo's disqualification, users of Internet forum ForoCoches mass voted for John Cobra, who eventually placed among the top ten acts at the conclusion of the voting. Following his performance at Destino Oslo, Cobra was booed by the audience, prompting him to respond with offensive insults and gestures on live television in addition to exclaiming "Viva ForoCoches" (Long live ForoCoches). Following heavy criticism, RTVE president Alberto Oliart apologised in front of the Spanish Senate for the incident.

== At Eurovision ==
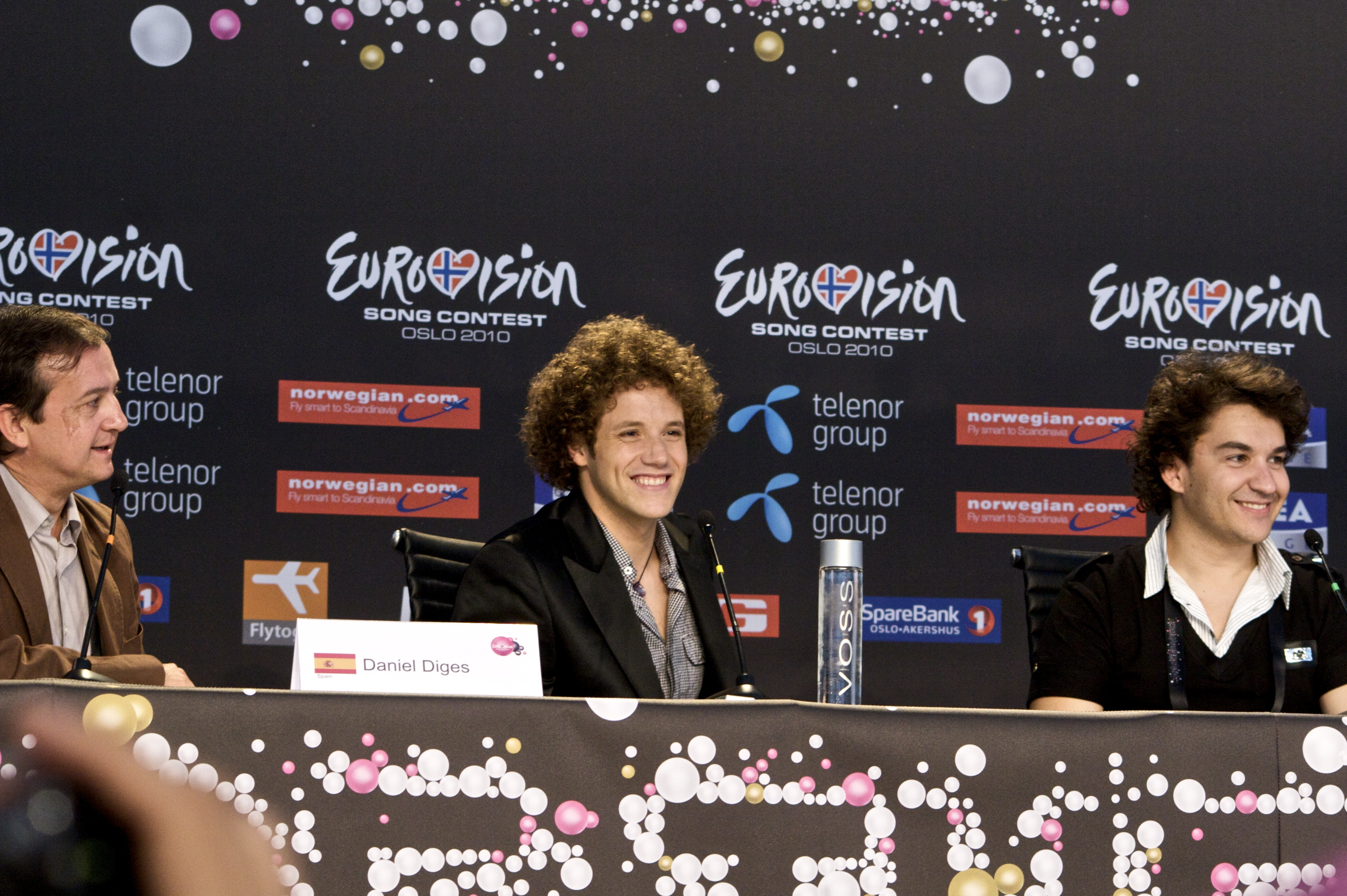
Daniel Diges during a press meet and greet

According to Eurovision rules, all nations with the exceptions of the host country and the "Big Four" (France, Germany, Spain and the United Kingdom) are required to qualify from one of two semi-finals in order to compete for the final; the top ten countries from each semi-final progress to the final. As a member of the "Big 4", Spain automatically qualified to compete in the final on 29 May 2010. In addition to their participation in the final, Spain is also required to broadcast and vote in one of the two semi-finals. During the semi-final allocation draw on 7 February 2010, Spain was assigned to broadcast and vote in the first semi-final on 25 May 2010.

In Spain, the semi-finals were broadcast on La 2 and the final was broadcast on La 1 with commentary by José Luis Uribarri. RTVE appointed Ainhoa Arbizu as its spokesperson to announce during the final the Spanish votes. The broadcast of the final was watched by 5.76 million viewers in Spain with a market share of 41.9%. This represented an increase of 6% from the previous year with 638,000 more viewers.

=== Final ===
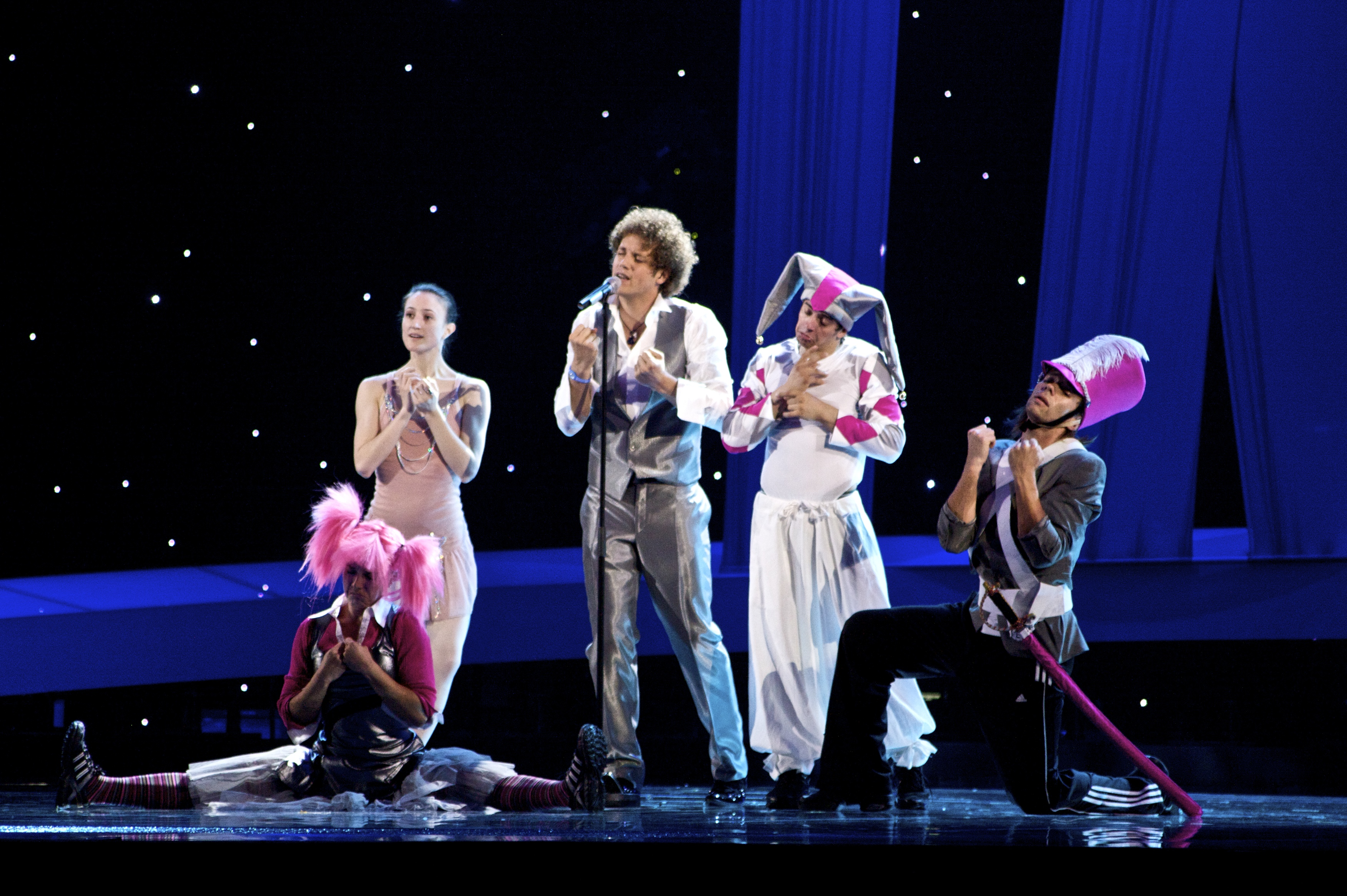
Daniel Diges during a rehearsal before the final

Daniel Diges took part in technical rehearsals on 22 and 23 May, followed by dress rehearsals on 25 and 26 May. This included the jury final on 25 May where the professional juries of each country watched and voted on the competing entries. During the running order draw for the semi-final and final on 23 March 2010, Spain was placed to perform in position 2, following the entry from Azerbaijan and before the entry from Norway.

The Spanish performance featured Daniel Diges on stage wearing a grey suit, surrounded by four dancers wearing circus character costumes (rag doll, classic dancer, pierrot and tin soldier) which began by standing quiet in acrobatic positions behind Diges. The stage lighting changed from dark blue colours to dark pink as the performance progressed. The performance also featured the use of fire sparkles. During the performance, Spanish pitch invader Jimmy Jump made up on stage before being quickly chased off stage by security and escorted from the arena by police. As a result of this, Diges was allowed to perform once again following the final entry from Denmark. In regards to the stage invasion, Diges stated following the contest: "I was frightened. I thought it could be more serious than it actually was, but nothing happened. So, I am happy. [...] Thank God for being in theatre for so long. Many things have happened to me, and this has been a test that has enabled me to show the best of me and my experience." The choreographer for the performance was Maite Marcos. The four dancers that joined Daniel Diges were Lidia Gómez, Gwenaelle Poline, Alejandro Arce and Yuriy Omelchenko. Diges was also joined by a backing vocalist on stage: David Velardo. Spain placed fifteenth in the final, scoring 68 points.

=== Voting ===
Voting during the three shows consisted of 50 percent public televoting and 50 percent from a jury deliberation. The jury consisted of five music industry professionals who were citizens of the country they represent. This jury was asked to judge each contestant based on: vocal capacity; the stage performance; the song's composition and originality; and the overall impression by the act. In addition, no member of a national jury could be related in any way to any of the competing acts in such a way that they cannot vote impartially and independently. The following members comprised the Spanish jury: José María Íñigo (journalist, actor, television presenter), Mauro Canut (director of the digital branch of RTVE), Pilar Tabares (radio presenter, TVE music director), Mariola Orellana (music manager) and Toni Garrido (journalist at RNE).

Following the release of the full split voting by the EBU after the conclusion of the competition, it was revealed that Spain had placed twelfth with the public televote and twentieth with the jury vote. In the public vote, Spain scored 106 points and in the jury vote the nation scored 43 points.

Below is a breakdown of points awarded to Spain and awarded by Spain in the first semi-final and grand final of the contest. The nation awarded its 12 points to Portugal in the semi-final and to Germany in the final of the contest.

==== Points awarded to Spain ====
Points awarded to Spain (Final)
Score	Country
12 points	Portugal
10 points	
8 points	Lithuania
7 points	Albania; Armenia
6 points	
5 points	Latvia; Slovenia
4 points	Finland; Moldova; Russia; Ukraine
3 points	
2 points	Bulgaria; Georgia; Romania
1 point	Belgium; Israel

==== Points awarded by Spain ====
Points awarded by Spain (Semi-final 1)
Score	Country
12 points	Portugal
10 points	Greece
8 points	Belgium
7 points	Iceland
6 points	Serbia
5 points	Moldova
4 points	Albania
3 points	Poland
2 points	Finland
1 point	Malta

Points awarded by Spain (Final)
Score	Country
12 points	Germany
10 points	Romania
8 points	Armenia
7 points	Azerbaijan
6 points	Portugal
5 points	Greece
4 points	Denmark
3 points	Turkey
2 points	France
1 point	Georgia
