= Ukraine in the Eurovision Song Contest 2010 =

- Eurovision Song Contest 2010
- Participating broadcaster: National Television Company of Ukraine (NTU)
- Country: Ukraine
- Selection process: Artist: Yevrobachennia. Ukraina-2010; Song: Internal selection
- Selection date: Artist: 20 March 2010; Song: 24 March 2010

Competing entry
- Song: "Sweet People"
- Artist: Alyosha
- Songwriters: Borys Kukoba; Vadim Lisitsa; Olena Kucher

Placement
- Semi-final result: Qualified (7th, 77 points)
- Final result: 10th, 108 points

Participation chronology

Ukraine was represented at the Eurovision Song Contest 2010 with the song "Sweet People", written by Borys Kukoba, Vadim Lisitsa and Olena Kucher, and performed by Kucher herself under her stage name Alyosha. The Ukrainian participating broadcaster, the National Television Company of Ukraine (NTU), organised a national final in order to select its entry, following objections to its initial selection process. The song was internally selected after the winning song from the second national final was discarded following allegations of plagiarism.

In December 2009, NTU internally selected Vasyl Lazarovych as it performer for the 2010 contest, while his song was selected through a national final held on 5 March 2010. Five songs competed in the final where "I Love You" was selected following the combination of votes from a six-member jury panel and a public televote. After objections to the internal selection of Lazarovych, NTU organised a new open national final which was held on 20 March 2010. Twenty entries competed in the new national selection where "To Be Free" performed by Alyosha was selected after tying for first place following the combination of votes from a seven-member jury panel and a public televote—the tie was decided by the jury in Alyosha's favour. Following plagiarism allegations and claims that "To Be Free" had been made available publicly in 2008, the song was replaced with "Sweet People", which was presented to the public on 25 March 2010.

Ukraine was drawn to compete in the second semi-final of the Eurovision Song Contest which took place on 27 May 2010. Performing during the show in position 8, "Sweet People" was announced among the top 10 entries of the second semi-final and therefore qualified to compete in the final on 29 May. It was later revealed that Ukraine placed seventh out of the 17 participating countries in the semi-final with 77 points. In the final, Ukraine performed in position 17 and placed tenth out of the 25 participating countries with 108 points.

== Background ==
Prior to the 2010 contest, the National Television Company of Ukraine (NTU) had participated in the Eurovision Song Contest representing Ukraine seven times since its first entry in 2003, winning the contest in 2004 with the song "Wild Dances" performed by Ruslana. Following the introduction of semi-finals for the 2004, Ukraine had managed to qualify to final in every contest they participated in thus far. Ukraine had been the runner-up in the contest on two occasions: in 2007 with the song "Dancing Lasha Tumbai" performed by Verka Serduchka and in 2008 with the song "Shady Lady" performed by Ani Lorak. Their least successful result had been 19th place, achieved in 2005, with the song "Razom nas bahato" performed by GreenJolly.

As part of its duties as participating broadcaster, NTU organises the selection of its entry in the Eurovision Song Contest and broadcasts the event in the country. The broadcaster confirmed its intentions to participate at the 2010 contest on 28 December 2009. In the past, the broadcaster had alternated between both internal selections and national finals in order to select its entry. Between 2005 and 2009, NTU had set up national finals to choose both or either the song and performer to compete at Eurovision for Ukraine, with both the public and a panel of jury members involved in the selection. The method was continued to select the 2010 entry.

== Before Eurovision ==
=== Original selection ===
On 29 December 2009, NTU announced during a press conference that they had internally selected Vasyl Lazarovych to represent Ukraine in Oslo. Vasyl Lazarovych's selection as the Ukrainian representative was decided upon from six artists considered by the Arts Council of NTU, with ten out of eleven members voting in favour of Lazarovych. On 13 January 2010, NTU announced that they would organise a national final to select his song. Composers had the opportunity to submit their songs between 13 January 2010 and 7 February 2010. A seven-member selection panel reviewed the 106 received submissions and shortlisted five songs to compete in the national final. On 2 March 2010, the five selected competing songs were announced.

The final took place on 5 March 2010 at the NTU Studio 1 in Kyiv, hosted by Maria Orlova and Timur Miroshnychenko and broadcast on Pershyi Natsionalnyi as well as online via NTU's official website 1tv.com.ua and the official Eurovision Song Contest website eurovision.tv. All five competing songs were performed Vasyl Lazarovych and the winning song, "I Love You", was selected through the combination of votes from a public televote and an expert jury. The jury panel consisted of Dmitry Gershinzon (chief manager of Sony Music), Oleksandr Zlotnik (composer), Aniko Rekhviashvili (choreographer), Elena Zagorodnyuk (director of music and entertainment at NTU), Vasyl Ilashchuk (President of NTU) and Vasyl Lazarovych. In addition to the performances of the competing songs, 2010 Armenian Eurovision entrant Eva Rivas, 2010 Azerbaijani Eurovision entrant Safura Alizadeh, 2010 Bulgarian Eurovision entrant Miro, 2010 Georgian Eurovision entrant Sopho Nizharadze, Goryachiy Shokolad, Irina Rosenfeld, Tatyana Nedelska and Katya Burzynska performed as guests.

Song selection – 5 March 2010
R/O	Song	Songwriter(s)	Points	Place
1	"Adrenalin" (Адреналин)	Dmitriy Klimashenko, Olga Yarynich	3	3
2	"Shine of Your Star"	Ziga Pirnat, Brandon Stone	8	2
3	"I Know"	Nicolae Caragia, Brandon Stone	8	2
4	"Don't Wanna Lose You"	Claes Andreasson	3	3
5	"I Love You"	Brandon Stone, Olga Yarynich	14	1

==== Controversy and new final announcement ====
NTU's internal selection of Vasyl Lazarovych received criticism due to the unfair competition for other artists who wished to take part, while the jury stated during the national final that they were not satisfied with the quality of the songs and the ways Lazarovych performed them. On 15 March, it was announced that the broadcaster's management had resigned from their respective positions meaning a new selection may be organised to replace Lazarovych as the Ukrainian representative for the 2010 contest. The new management of NTU held an emergency press conference on 17 March where they announced the organisation of a new open national final.

=== Yevrobachennia. Ukraina-2010 ===
The second national final held in order to select Ukraine's entry for the Eurovision Song Contest took place on 20 March 2010 at the Savik Shuster Studio in Kyiv. The show was hosted by Savik Shuster and Olha Freimut and broadcast on Pershyi Natsionalnyi and Novyi Kanal as well as online via NTU and Novyi Kanal's respective websites 1tv.com.ua and tv.intv.ua.

==== Format ====
The selection of the competing entries for the national final and ultimately the Ukrainian Eurovision entry took place over two stages. In the first stage, artists and songwriters had the opportunity to apply for the competition by attending a scheduled audition. Twenty acts were selected and announced on 19 March 2010. The second stage was the televised final, which took place on 20 March 2010 and featured the twenty acts vying to represent Ukraine in Oslo. The winner was selected via the 50/50 combination of votes from a public televote and an expert jury. The public televote was held from 18 March 2010, during which the public had the opportunity to submit their votes for the participating entries via SMS.

==== Competing entries ====
Interested performers had the opportunity to attend auditions held on 18 March 2010 at the Savik Shuster Studio in Kyiv. A five-member selection panel consisting of Igor Likhuta (composer and producer), Walid Arfush (producer), Andrey Urenev (programme director of MTV Ukraine), Oksana Panasivska (chief producer of Novyi Kanal) and Volodymyr Orlov (general producer of OTV) reviewed 63 received submissions and shortlisted twenty entries to compete in the national final. On 19 March 2010, the twenty selected competing acts were announced.

==== Final ====
The final took place on 20 March 2010. Twenty entries competed and the winner, "To Be Free" performed by Alyosha, was selected through the combination of votes from a public televote held between 18 and 20 March 2010 and an expert jury. The jury panel consisted of Egor Benkendorf (President of NTU), Mykhailo Kulinyak (Minister of Culture and Tourism of Ukraine), Walid Arfush (producer), Yuriy Molchanov (general producer of Enter-music), Iryna Lysenko (Head of the Board of Novyi Kanal), Volodymyr Orlov (general producer of OTV) and Andrey Urenev (programme director of MTV Ukraine). Since Masha Sobko and Alyosha were tied at 36 points each, the jury selected Alyosha as the winner.

Final – 20 March 2010
R/O	Artist	Song	Songwriter(s)	Points	Place
1	Vitaliy Kozlovskiy	"I-L@VE?"	Gennady Krupnik, Pavel Shilko	—	—
2	Vasyl Lazarovych	"I Love You"	Brandon Stone, Olga Yarynich	24	7
3	SH and BB	"Ne zhurys'" (Не журись)	Dmytro Bohush, Yevhen Kolesnik	—	—
4	Oleksiy Matias	"Angely ne umirayut" (Ангелы не умирают)	Konstantin Meladze	32	3
5	Zaklyopki	"Anybody Home?"	Katya Komar, Sergiy Kabanets	23	8
6	Ivan Berezovskyi	"No Doubt"	Mikhail Nekrasov, Oleg Chornyy	21	10
7	Stereo	"Ne skhody s uma" (Не сходи с ума)	Stas Shurins	22	9
8	Irina Rosenfeld	"Forever"	Irina Rosenfeld, Oleksandr Mankin	29	6
9	Shanis	"Lechu k tebe" (Лечу к тебе)	Mykola Shandryk, Taras Piskun	—	—
10	Max Barskih	"White Raven"	Mykola Bortnyk	—	—
11	Vladislav Levytskyi	"Davay, davay!" (Давай, давай!)	Vladislav Levytskyi, Taras Topolya	—	—
12	Miya	"Vona" (Вона)	Nazar Savko	—	—
13	DaZzle Dreams	"Emotional Lady"	Dmytro Tsyperdyuk	—	—
14	Masha Sobko	"Ya tebya lyublyu" (Я тебя люблю)	Ruslan Kvinta, Vitaliy Kurovskiy	36	2
15	Zlata Ognevich	"Tiny Island"	Mikhail Nekrasov, Evheniy Matyushenko	30	5
16	Mira Gold	"Crazy Lady"	Mira Gold, Sonya Sytnyk	—	—
17	Natalia Valevska	"Europe"	Ruslan Kvinta, Natalia Valevska, Larissa Flint	31	4
18	Juliya Voice	"Zavyazhi mne glaza" (Завяжи мне глаза)	Juliya Voice	—	—
19	El Kravchuk	"Fly to Heaven"	Andriy Danylko, Semyon Horov, Peter Dickinson	21	10
20	Alyosha	"To Be Free"	Olena Kucher, Bogdan Chykalyuk	36	1

=== Rule violations and replacement entry selection ===
Following Alyosha's win at the Ukrainian national final, allegations were made that "To Be Free" plagiarized the song "Knock Me Out" by Linda Perry and Grace Slick, and had been made available publicly in 2008. NTU later stated in a press release that they would conduct an investigation over the issue. During the Head of Delegations meeting on 22 March 2010, the broadcaster announced that they were given an extended deadline by the EBU in order to submit a replacement by 26 March, with fines being imposed every next day that no entry has been received by the EBU. The replacement entry "Sweet People", written by Alyosha together with Borys Kukoba and Vadim Lisitsa, was announced on 24 March and presented to the public the following day via the official Eurovision Song Contest's YouTube channel.

=== Promotion ===
Alyosha specifically promoted "Sweet People" as the Ukrainian Eurovision entry on 24 March 2010 by performing during the Eurovision in Concert event which was held at the Lexion venue in Zaanstad, Netherlands and hosted by Cornald Maas and Marga Bult.

== At Eurovision ==
According to Eurovision rules, all nations with the exceptions of the host country and the "Big Four" (France, Germany, Spain and the United Kingdom) were required to qualify from one of two semi-finals in order to compete for the final; the top ten countries from each semi-final progress to the final. The European Broadcasting Union (EBU) split up the competing countries into six different pots based on voting patterns from previous contests, with countries with favourable voting histories put into the same pot. On 7 February 2010, a special allocation draw was held which placed each country into one of the two semi-finals, as well as which half of the show they would perform in. Ukraine was placed into the second semi-final, to be held on 27 May 2010, and was scheduled to perform in the first half of the show. The running order for the semi-finals was decided through another draw on 23 March 2010 and Ukraine was set to perform in position 8, following the entry from Azerbaijan and before the entry from the Netherlands.

In Ukraine, both the semi-finals and the final were broadcast on Pershyi Natsionalnyi with commentary by Timur Miroshnychenko. NTU appointed Iryna Zhuravska as its spokesperson to announce the Ukrainian votes during the final.

=== Semi-final ===
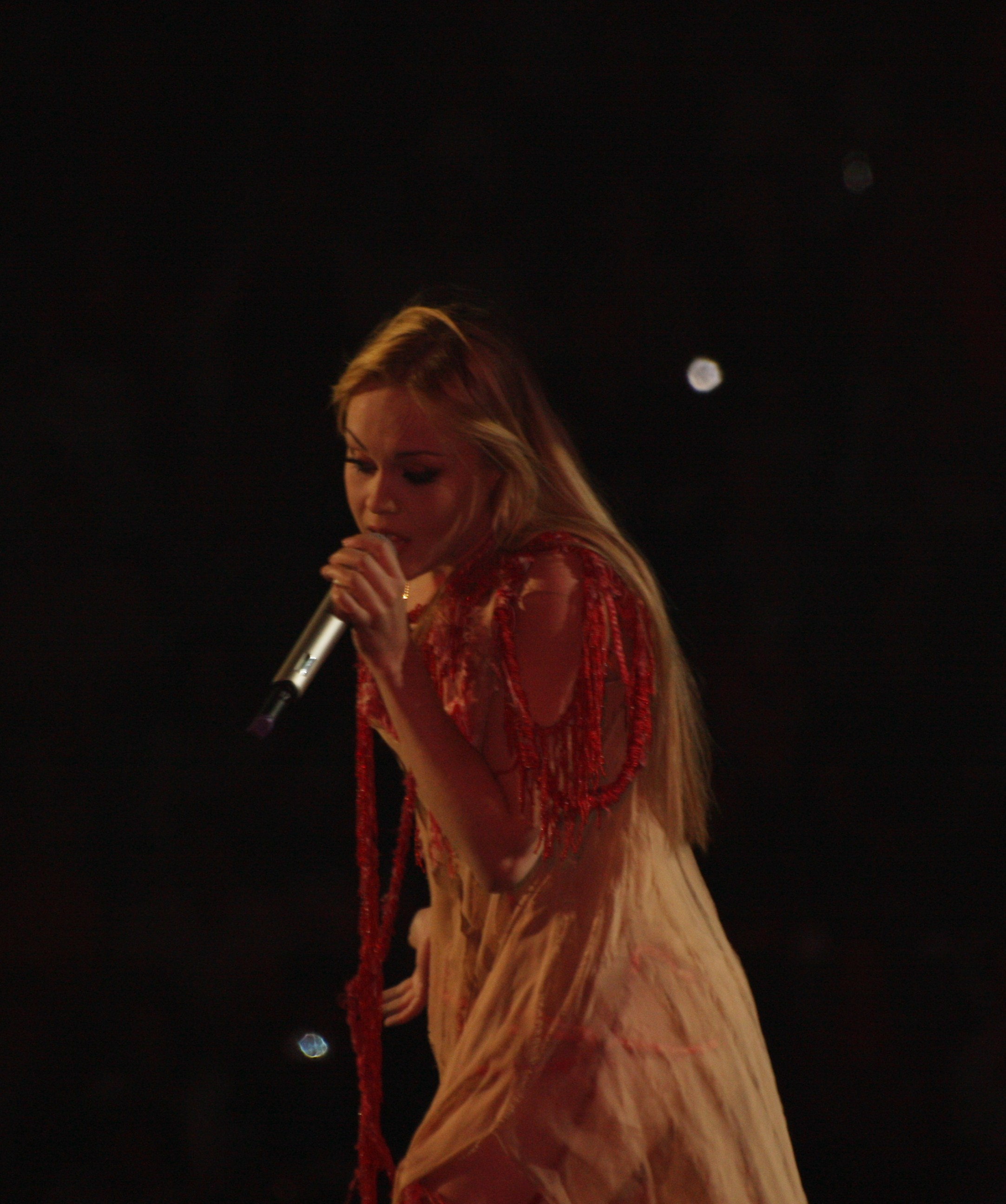
Alyosha during a rehearsal before the second semi-final

Alyosha took part in technical rehearsals on 19 and 22 May, followed by dress rehearsals on 26 and 27 May. This included the jury show on 26 May where the professional juries of each country watched and voted on the competing entries.

The Ukrainian performance featured Alyosha performing on stage in a black leather coat with hood, which she later removed and dropped to the floor revealing a long light brown dress with red fringes. The performance began with a predominately dark stage and a red spotlight on Alyosha, and featured red and white blinking lights as well as the use of a wind machine starting from the first chorus. Alyosha's stage costume was designed by Liliia Litkovska, who created it to portray the singer as "a girl who fights for purity on her planet" and "is hurt by what is happening in the world".

At the end of the show, Ukraine was announced as having finished in the top 10 and subsequently qualifying for the grand final. It was later revealed that Ukraine placed seventh in the semi-final, receiving a total of 77 points.

=== Final ===
Shortly after the second semi-final, a winners' press conference was held for the ten qualifying countries. As part of this press conference, the qualifying artists took part in a draw to determine the running order for the final. This draw was done in the order the countries were announced during the semi-final. Ukraine was drawn to perform in position 17, following the entry from Iceland and before the entry from France.

Alyosha once again took part in dress rehearsals on 28 and 29 May before the final, including the jury final where the professional juries cast their final votes before the live show. Alyosha performed a repeat of her semi-final performance during the final on 29 May. At the conclusion of the voting, Ukraine finished in tenth place with 108 points.

=== Voting ===
Voting during the three shows consisted of 50 percent public televoting and 50 percent from a jury deliberation. The jury consisted of five music industry professionals who were citizens of the country they represent. This jury was asked to judge each contestant based on: vocal capacity; the stage performance; the song's composition and originality; and the overall impression by the act. In addition, no member of a national jury could be related in any way to any of the competing acts in such a way that they cannot vote impartially and independently.

Following the release of the full split voting by the EBU after the conclusion of the competition, it was revealed that Ukraine had placed thirteenth with the public televote and sixth with the jury vote in the final. In the public vote, Ukraine scored 94 points, while with the jury vote, Ukraine scored 129 points. In the second semi-final, Ukraine placed seventh with the public televote with 77 points and tenth with the jury vote, scoring 78 points.

Below is a breakdown of points awarded to Ukraine and awarded by Ukraine in the second semi-final and grand final of the contest. The nation awarded its 12 points to Azerbaijan in the semi-final and the final of the contest.

==== Points awarded to Ukraine ====
Points awarded to Ukraine (Semi-final 2)
Score	Country
12 points	
10 points	Armenia; Lithuania
8 points	Azerbaijan
7 points	Georgia
6 points	Bulgaria; Croatia; Cyprus
5 points	Romania
4 points	Norway
3 points	Denmark; Turkey
2 points	Ireland; Israel; Netherlands; United Kingdom
1 point	Slovenia

Points awarded to Ukraine (Final)
Score	Country
12 points	
10 points	Azerbaijan; Belarus
8 points	Armenia; Moldova
7 points	Bulgaria; Georgia; Latvia; Netherlands; Russia; Serbia
6 points	Cyprus; Lithuania
5 points	Romania; United Kingdom
4 points	
3 points	Poland
2 points	France; Israel
1 point	Turkey

==== Points awarded by Ukraine ====
Points awarded by Ukraine (Semi-final 2)
Score	Country
12 points	Azerbaijan
10 points	Turkey
8 points	Armenia
7 points	Georgia
6 points	Israel
5 points	Denmark
4 points	Cyprus
3 points	Romania
2 points	Lithuania
1 point	Bulgaria

Points awarded by Ukraine (Final)
Score	Country
12 points	Azerbaijan
10 points	Russia
8 points	Turkey
7 points	Georgia
6 points	Armenia
5 points	Germany
4 points	Spain
3 points	Israel
2 points	Romania
1 point	Belgium
