= Poland in the Eurovision Song Contest 2010 =

- Eurovision Song Contest 2010
- Participating broadcaster: Telewizja Polska (TVP)
- Country: Poland
- Selection process: Krajowe Eliminacje 2010
- Selection date: 14 February 2010

Competing entry
- Song: "Legenda"
- Artist: Marcin Mroziński
- Songwriters: Marcin Nierubiec; Marcin Mroziński

Placement
- Semi-final result: Failed to qualify (13th)

Participation chronology

Poland was represented at the Eurovision Song Contest 2010 with the song "Legenda", written by Marcin Nierubiec and Marcin Mroziński, and performed by Marcin Mroziński. The Polish participating broadcaster, Telewizja Polska (TVP), organised the national final Krajowe Eliminacje 2010 in order to select its entry for the contest. The national final took place on 14 February 2010 and featured ten entries. "Legenda" performed by Marcin Mroziński was selected as the winner after gaining 33.61% of the public vote.

Poland was drawn to compete in the first semi-final of the Eurovision Song Contest which took place on 25 May 2010. Performing in position 9, "Legenda" was not announced among the top 10 entries of the first semi-final and therefore did not qualify to compete in the final. It was later revealed that Poland placed thirteenth out of the 17 participating countries in the semi-final with 44 points.

== Background ==
Prior to the 2010 contest, Telewizja Polska (TVP) had participated in the Eurovision Song Contest representing Poland fourteen times since its first entry in 1994. Its highest placement in the contest, to this point, has been second place, achieved with its debut entry in 1994 with the song "To nie ja!" performed by Edyta Górniak. It has only, thus far, reached the top ten on one other occasion, when "Keine Grenzen – Żadnych granic" performed by Ich Troje finished seventh in 2003. Between 2005 and 2009, it failed to qualify from the semi-final round four out of five years with only its 2008 entry, "For Life" performed by Isis Gee, managing to qualify to the final during that period. In 2009, "I Don't Wanna Leave" performed by Lidia Kopania failed to qualify to the final.

As part of its duties as participating broadcaster, TVP organises the selection of its entry in the Eurovision Song Contest and broadcasts the event in the country. The broadcaster confirmed its participation in the 2010 contest on 18 September 2009. Since 2006, TVP organised televised national finals that featured a competition among several artists and songs in order to select its entry for the Eurovision Song Contest, a selection procedure that continued for its 2010 entry.

== Before Eurovision ==
=== Krajowe Eliminacje 2010 ===
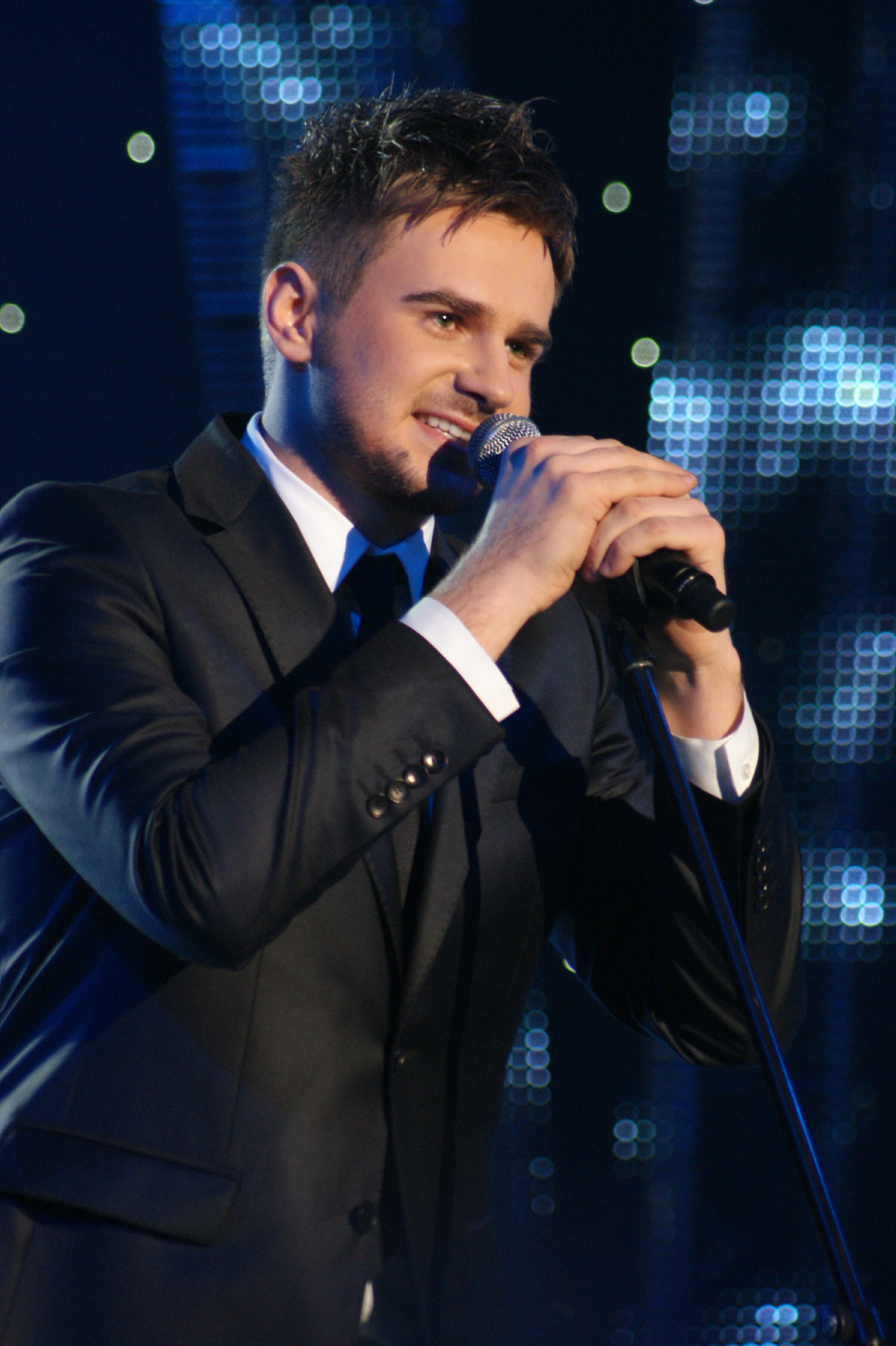
Marcin Mroziński performing at Krajowe Eliminacje 2010

Krajowe Eliminacje 2010 was the national final organised by TVP in order to select its entry for the Eurovision Song Contest 2010. The show took place on 14 February 2010 at the TVP Headquarters in Warsaw, hosted by Aleksandra Rosiak and Artur Orzech. Public televoting exclusively selected the winner. The show was broadcast on TVP1, TVP HD and TVP Polonia as well as streamed online at the official Eurovision Song Contest website eurovision.tv. The national final was watched by 3.2 million viewers in Poland with a market share of 21%.

==== Competing entries ====
TVP opened a submission period for interested artists and songwriters to submit their entries between 25 September 2009 and 2 November 2009. Only artists with Polish citizenship were eligible to compete, while songwriters were required to have Polish origin. The broadcaster received 122 submissions at the closing of the deadline. A ten-member selection committee selected four entries from the received submissions to compete in the national final, which were announced on 25 November 2009. The selection committee consisted of Wojciech Hoflik (director of TVP1), Maria Szabłowska (music journalist at TVP and Polish Radio), Paweł Sztompke (journalist, music critic and editorial director of music at Polish Radio), Krzysztof Szewczyk (music journalist at TVP and Polish Radio), Boleslaw Pawica (TV director, screenwriter and producer), Artur Orzech (Eurovision commentator, radio and television journalist and presenter), Marek Lamprecht (TV editor, director and producer), Piotr Klatt (musician, songwriter, journalist and music producer at TVP and artistic director of the Opole Festival), Mikołaj Dobrowolski (Assistant Head of Delegation for Poland at the Eurovision Song Contest) and Tomasz Deszczyński (President of OGAE Poland). TVP selected an additional seven entries to compete as wildcards following an additional submission period, which were announced between 28 November 2009 and 28 January 2010.

On 11 December 2009, the song "PIN Lady", written by Andrzej Lampert and Aleksander Wozniak and to have been performed by PIN, was withdrawn from the national final due to scheduling issues of the band.

Artist	Song	Songwriter(s)	Selection
Aneta Figiel	"Myśl o tobie"	Aneta Figiel	Open submission
Anna Cyzon	"Love Me"	Anna Cyzon, Jason Gleed	Open submission
Dziewczyny	"Cash Box"	Tomek Organek, Anna Karamon	Open submission
Iwona Węgrowska	"Uwięziona"	Adam Sztaba, Tadeusz Miecznikowski	TVP wildcard
Leszcze	"Weekend"	Bartosz Staniszewski, Maciej Miecznikowski	TVP wildcard
Marcin Mroziński	"Legenda"	Marcin Nierubiec, Marcin Mroziński	TVP wildcard
Nefer	"Chciałem zostać sam!"	Sławomir Romanowski, Izabela Romanowski	TVP wildcard
Sonic Lake	"There Is a Way"	Szymon Guzowski, Michał Pietrzak, Julia Schiffter	TVP wildcard
VIR	"Sunrise"	Mariusz Długosz, Andrzej Ruszała	TVP wildcard
ZoSia	"To, co czuję (Jak ptak)"	Zosia Karbowiak	TVP wildcard

==== Final ====
The televised final took place on 14 February 2010. Ten entries competed and the winner, "Legenda" performed by Marcin Mroziński, was determined entirely by a public vote. In addition to the performances of the competing entries, 1994 Polish Eurovision entrant Edyta Górniak and 1999 Polish Eurovision entrant Mietek Szcześniak performed as the interval acts.

Final – 14 February 2010
R/O	Artist	Song	Televote	Place
1	Leszcze	"Weekend"	8.44%	5
2	Dziewczyny	"Cash Box"	1.92%	10
3	Iwona Węgrowska	"Uwięziona"	14.94%	3
4	Marcin Mroziński	"Legenda"	33.61%	1
5	Aneta Figiel	"Myśl o tobie"	9.06%	4
6	Nefer	"Chciałem zostać sam!"	5.97%	6
7	ZoSia	"To, co czuję (Jak ptak)"	3.04%	9
8	Anna Cyzon	"Love Me"	15.13%	2
9	Sonic Lake	"There Is a Way"	3.44%	8
10	VIR	"Sunrise"	4.45%	7

== At Eurovision ==
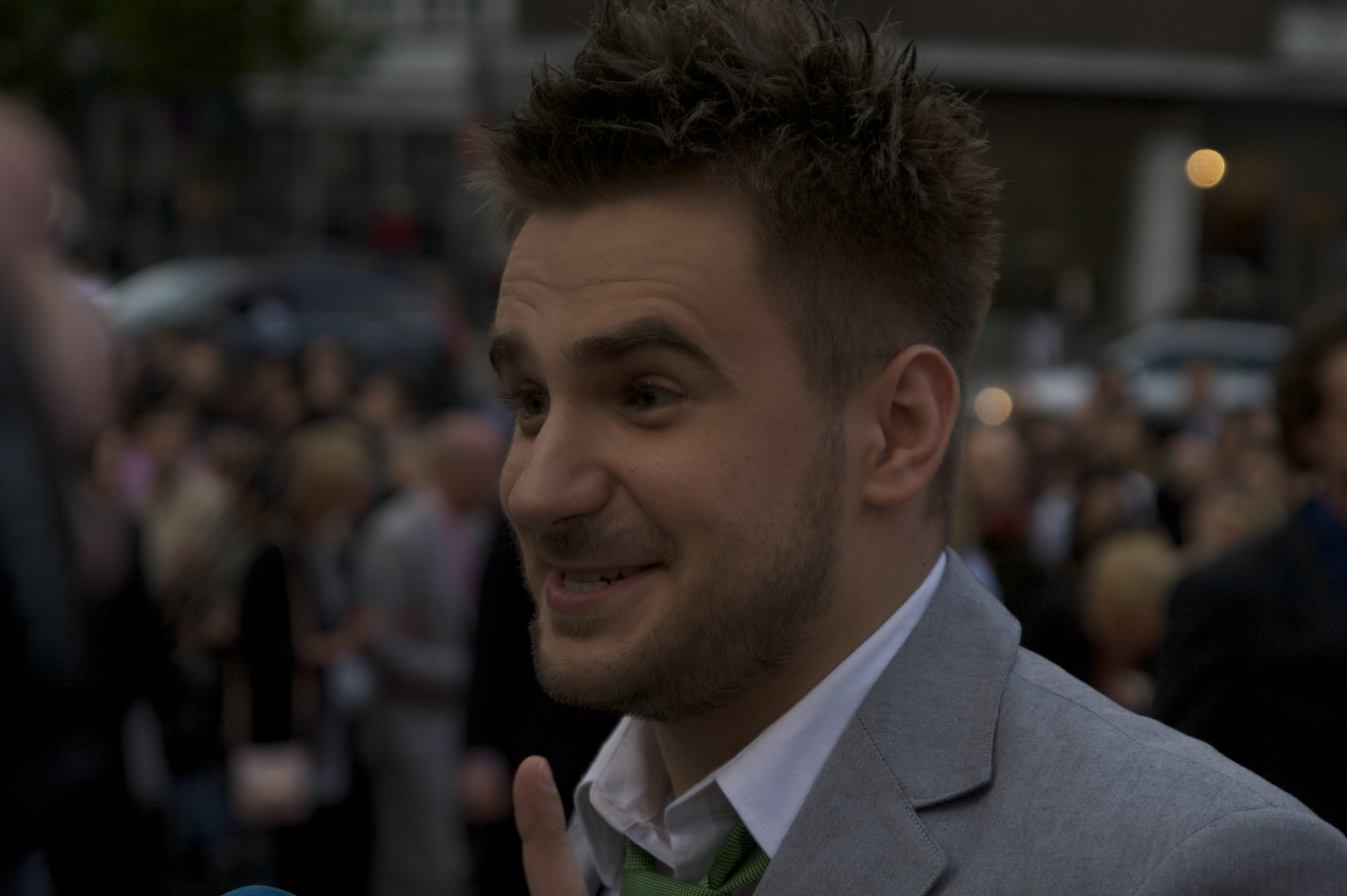
Marcin Mroziński at the Eurovision Opening Party in Oslo

According to Eurovision rules, all nations with the exceptions of the host country and the "Big Four" (France, Germany, Spain and the United Kingdom) are required to qualify from one of two semi-finals in order to compete for the final; the top ten countries from each semi-final progress to the final. The European Broadcasting Union (EBU) split up the competing countries into six different pots based on voting patterns from previous contests, with countries with favourable voting histories put into the same pot. On 7 February 2010, an allocation draw was held which placed each country into one of the two semi-finals, as well as which half of the show they would perform in. Poland was placed into the first semi-final, to be held on 25 May 2010, and was scheduled to perform in the second half of the show. The running order for the semi-finals was decided through another draw on 23 March 2010 and Poland was set to perform in position 9, following the entry from Bosnia and Herzegovina and before the entry from Belgium.

The two semi-finals and the final were broadcast in Poland on TVP1 and TVP Polonia with commentary by Artur Orzech. The Polish spokesperson, who announced the Polish votes during the final, was Aleksandra Rosiak.

=== Semi-final ===
Marcin Mroziński took part in technical rehearsals on 17 and 20 May, followed by dress rehearsals on 24 and 25 May. This included the jury show on 24 May where the professional juries of each country watched and voted on the competing entries.

The Polish performance featured Marcin Mroziński performing in a black suit and a dark red tie joined by five female dancers in traditional blouses and skirts, three of them which also provided backing vocals. During the performance, the dancers carried apples in their hands with which they did tricks with by biting into them and rolling them away on the floor. Towards the end of the song, Mroziński was hugged by one of the dancers who dropped pearls and slowly floated to the floor with the other dancers ripping off their blouses. The stage was predominately dark with the background displaying a starry sky. The stage costumes were designed by designer Rafał Orłowski, while the director for the Polish performance was Dariusz Lewandowski with the idea of symbolizing the sin of Adam and Eve. The backing performers that joined Mroziński on stage were: Paulina Andrzejewska, Oliwia Kukułka, Weronika Bochat, Mirella Kostrzewa, Małgorzata Czaczkowska. Bochat represented Poland in the Junior Eurovision Song Contest in 2004 as part of the group KWADro.

At the end of the show, Poland was not announced among the top 10 entries in the first semi-final and therefore failed to qualify to compete in the final. It was later revealed that Poland placed thirteenth in the semi-final, receiving a total of 44 points.

=== Voting ===
Voting during the three shows consisted of 50 percent public televoting and 50 percent from a jury deliberation. The jury consisted of five music industry professionals who were citizens of the country they represent. This jury was asked to judge each contestant based on: vocal capacity; the stage performance; the song's composition and originality; and the overall impression by the act. In addition, no member of a national jury could be related in any way to any of the competing acts in such a way that they cannot vote impartially and independently.

Following the release of the full split voting by the EBU after the conclusion of the competition, it was revealed that Poland had placed thirteenth with the public televote and eleventh with the jury vote in the first semi-final. In the public vote, Poland scored 38 points, while with the jury vote, Poland scored 58 points.

Below is a breakdown of points awarded to Poland and awarded by Poland in the first semi-final and grand final of the contest. The nation awarded its 12 points to Belgium in the semi-final and to Denmark in the final of the contest.

==== Points awarded to Poland ====
Points awarded to Poland (Semi-final 1)
Score	Country
12 points	
10 points	
8 points	
7 points	France; Germany
6 points	Albania; Belgium; Russia
5 points	
4 points	Latvia
3 points	Belarus; Spain
2 points	Moldova
1 point	

==== Points awarded by Poland ====
Points awarded by Poland (Semi-final 1)
Score	Country
12 points	Belgium
10 points	Iceland
8 points	Russia
7 points	Greece
6 points	Bosnia and Herzegovina
5 points	Estonia
4 points	Albania
3 points	Belarus
2 points	Portugal
1 point	Finland

Points awarded by Poland (Final)
Score	Country
12 points	Denmark
10 points	Belgium
8 points	Azerbaijan
7 points	Germany
6 points	Romania
5 points	Armenia
4 points	Georgia
3 points	Ukraine
2 points	Albania
1 point	Greece
