= Olena Topolia =

Ukrainian singer, composer, and songwriter

Olena Topolia Олена Тополя
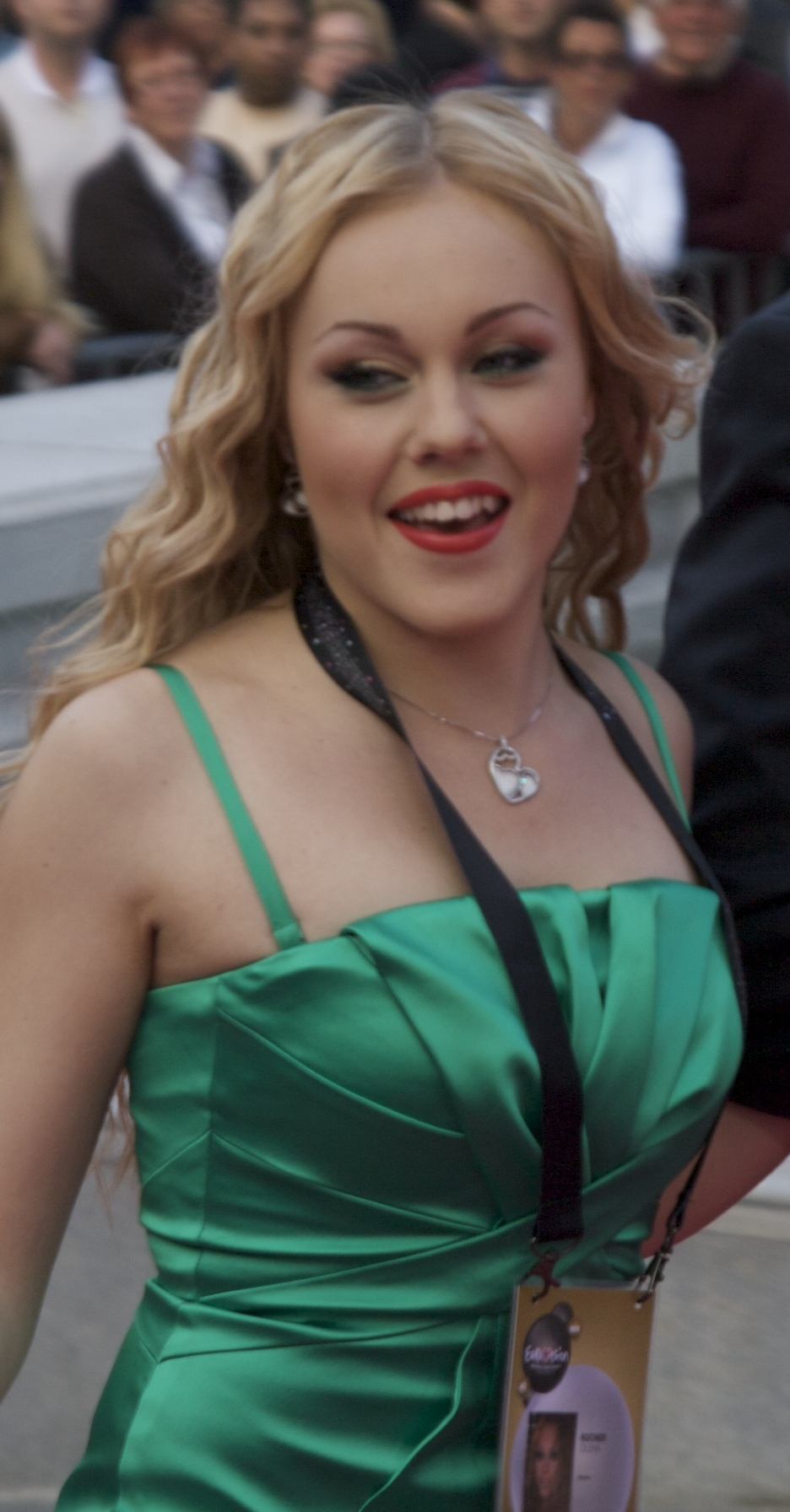
- Olena Topolia in Oslo, 23 May 2010

Background information
- Born: Olena Oleksandrivna Kucher; 14 May 1986 (age 40); Zaporizhia, Ukraine
- Genres: Rock; pop rock; alternative rock
- Occupation: Singer
- Years active: 1992–present
- Label: Catapult music
- Spouse: Taras Topolia (m. 2013)

Olena Oleksandrivna Kucher-Topolia (Ukrainian: Олена Олександрівна Кучер-Тополя, born 14 May 1986), until October 2023 known by her stage name Alyosha (Ukrainian: Aльоша), is a Ukrainian singer-songwriter. She represented Ukraine at the Eurovision Song Contest 2010 with the song "Sweet People", where she took tenth place, scoring 108 points in the final. She has a voice with a range of four octaves.

A multiple laureate, nominee and winner of the Ukrainian national music awards Zolota Zharptytsia, YUNA, M1 Music Awards, her songs were chosen as the best songs of the year for three consecutive years (2017–2019) within "Muszychna Platforma" awards. With the addition of Topolia's own songs, she also wrote lyrics for Natalia Mogilevska and the duet of Potap and NK.

== Career ==
=== Early life ===
Olena Topolia was born on 14 May 1986 in Zaporizhia. She studied vocals at the Kyiv National University of Culture and Arts and signed with the Catapult Music record label in 2008.

=== 2010: Ukraine in the Eurovision Song Contest 2010 ===
On 20 March 2010, Alyosha won the Ukrainian National Final and thus represented Ukraine in the Eurovision Song Contest 2010. She replaced Vasyl Lazarovych who was originally picked on December 29, 2009 to represent Ukraine. After some political changes that took place in Ukraine his candidacy was withdrawn on March 15 under suspicion that he was picked with the help of the current director of the State National Television (1st National) Vasyl Ilashchuk. The petition to organize another concourse and to cancel the current results was signed by several Ukrainian performers such as Taisia Povaliy, Ruslana Pysanka, and Kostyantyn Meladze.

Originally, she was due to participate in the contest with the song "To Be Free". Later on, it came to the light that the winning song has been available for purchase (under the name of Alonya) at Amazon.de since 12 April 2008. This would break the rules of the Eurovision Song Contest. A new song, "Sweet People", was chosen, two days after the 22 March deadline had passed, so NTU was fined by the EBU. Alyosha performed in the second semi-final on 27 May 2010, where she progressed to the final. In the final Alyosha finished 10th with 108 points.

== Charts ==
Year	Single	Chart positions		
Year	Single	UKR	RUS	SUI
2008	"To Be Free"	—	—	—
2009	"Sneg (Снег)"	—	169	—
2010	"Ty ujdesh (Ты уйдешь)"	6	52	—
2010	"Sweet People"	—	—	73
2011	"Kto skazal (Кто сказал)"	13	154	—

Awards and achievements
Preceded by Svetlana Loboda with "Be My Valentine! (Anti-Crisis Girl)"	Ukraine in the Eurovision Song Contest; 2010	Succeeded by Mika Newton with "Angel"
