= Peter Nalitch =

Russian singer (born 1981)

Peter Nalitch Пётр Налич
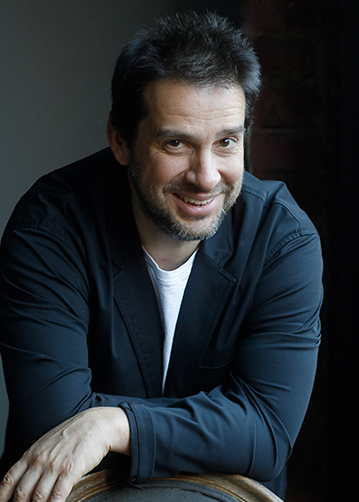
- Nalitch in 2025

Background information
- Born: Piotr Andreevich Nalich; April 30, 1981 (age 45); Russian SFSR, USSR
- Origin: Moscow
- Genres: Pop, comedy
- Instruments: Vocals, accordion, classical guitar
- Website: Peternalitch.com

Peter Andreyevich Nalitch (Russian: Пётр Андре́евич На́лич, pronounced [ˈpʲɵtr ɐnˈdrʲejɪvʲɪtɕ ˈnalʲɪtɕ], also spelled as Petr Nalich or Pyotr Nalich; born 30 April 1981) is a Russian singer and composer who represented Russia at the Eurovision Song Contest 2010 in Oslo. In the final on May 29, he came 11th with his song "Lost and Forgotten".

== Personal Info ==
Peter Nalitch was born on 30 April 1981 in Moscow, Russia. His grandfather Zahid Nalić, was a Bosnian opera singer from Tuzla, Bosnia and Herzegovina.

== "Gitar" ==
"Gitar"
Peter Nalitch has become famous thanks to "Gitar" and its broken English style

Peter Nalitch has become famous in Russia after the publication in 2007 on YouTube of the clip of his song "Gitar" (where he makes fun of himself with broken English lyrics and dubious film editing qualities). In about three years, more than 8,000,000 people had watched it. Interviews and articles about Peter followed in some Russian papers. The song "Gitar" is most popular in Greece, Germany and Slovakia.

== Peter Nalitch and Friends ==
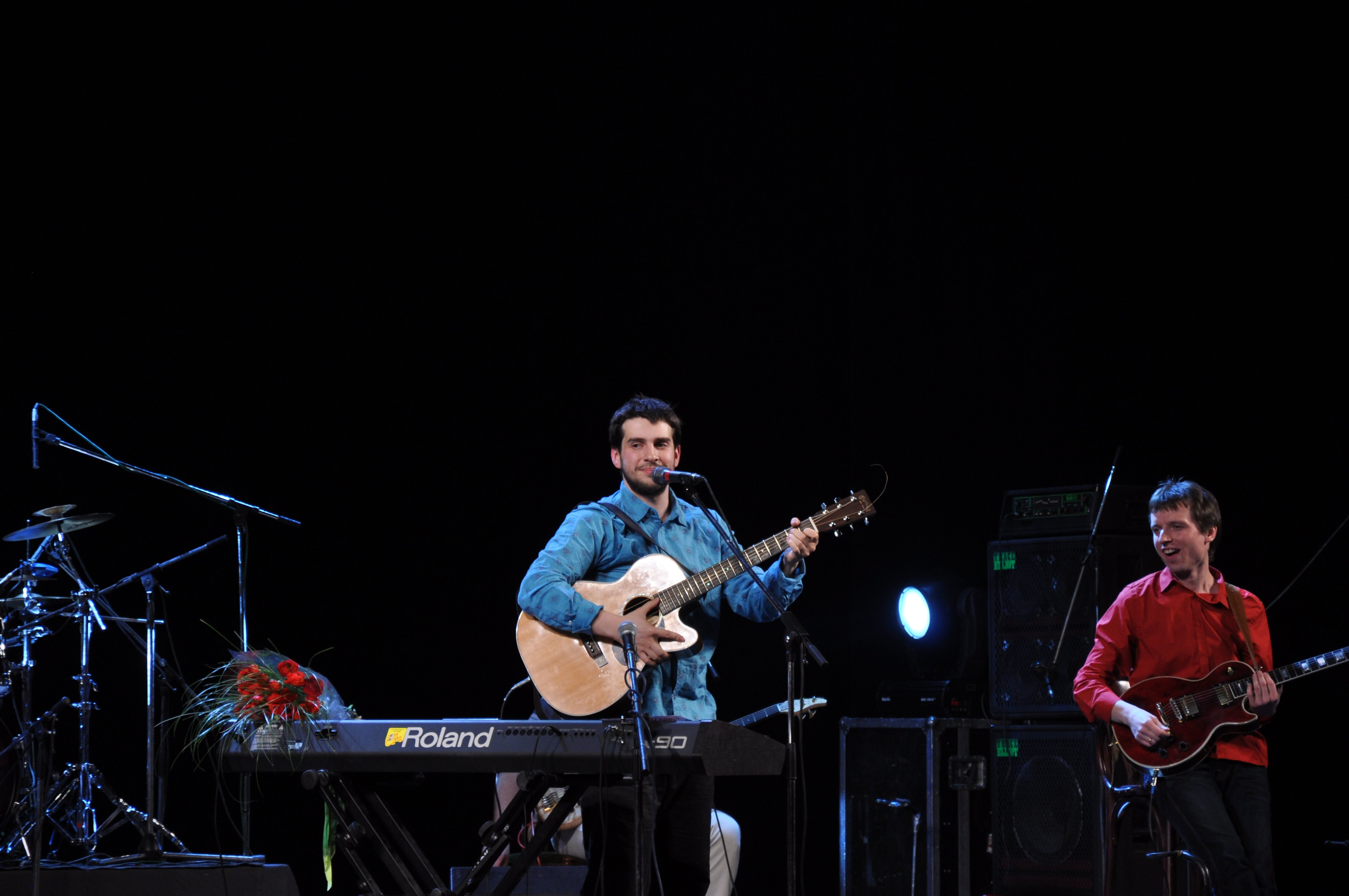
Peter Nalitch on stage

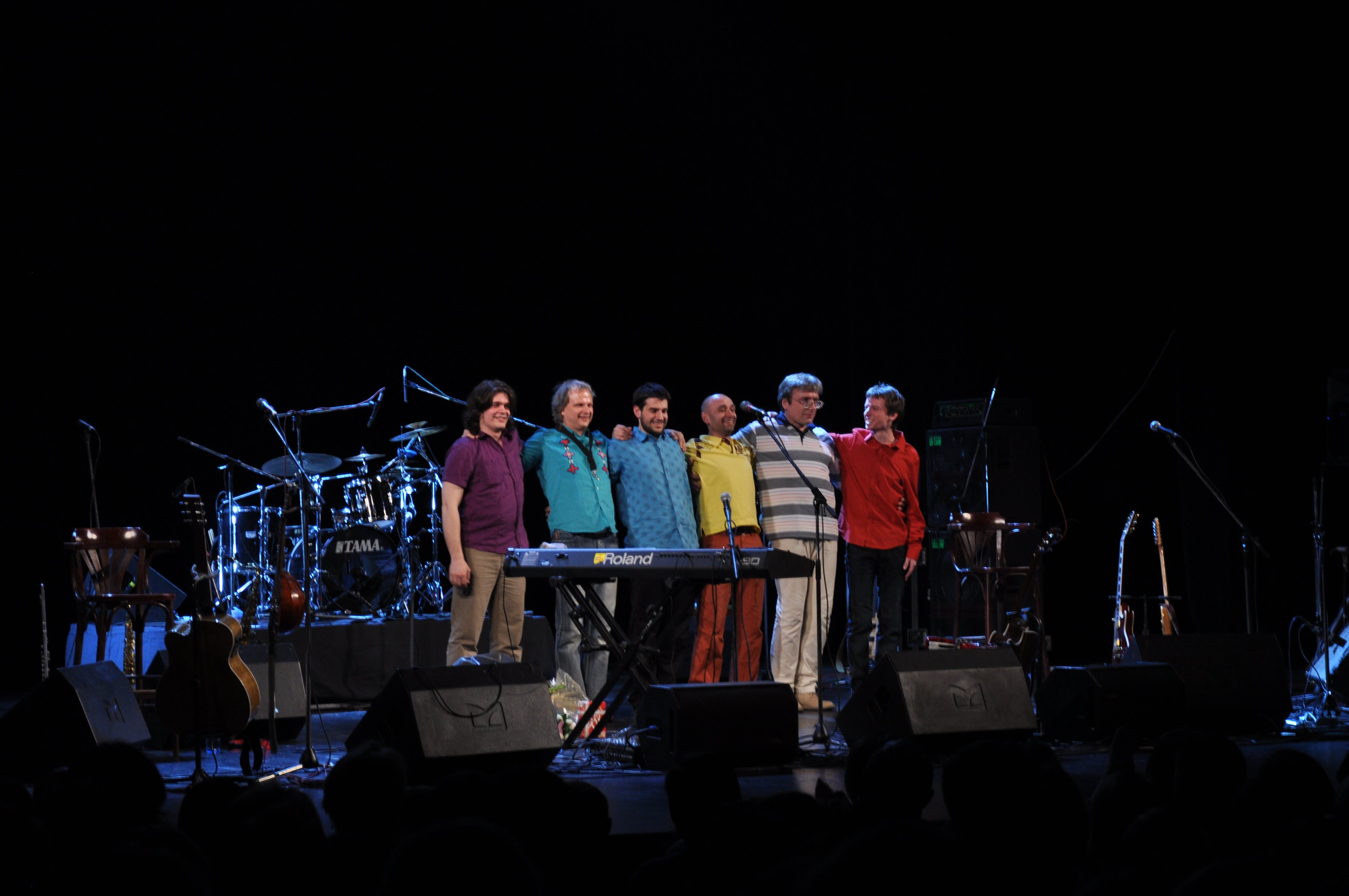
Peter Nalitch's musical collective

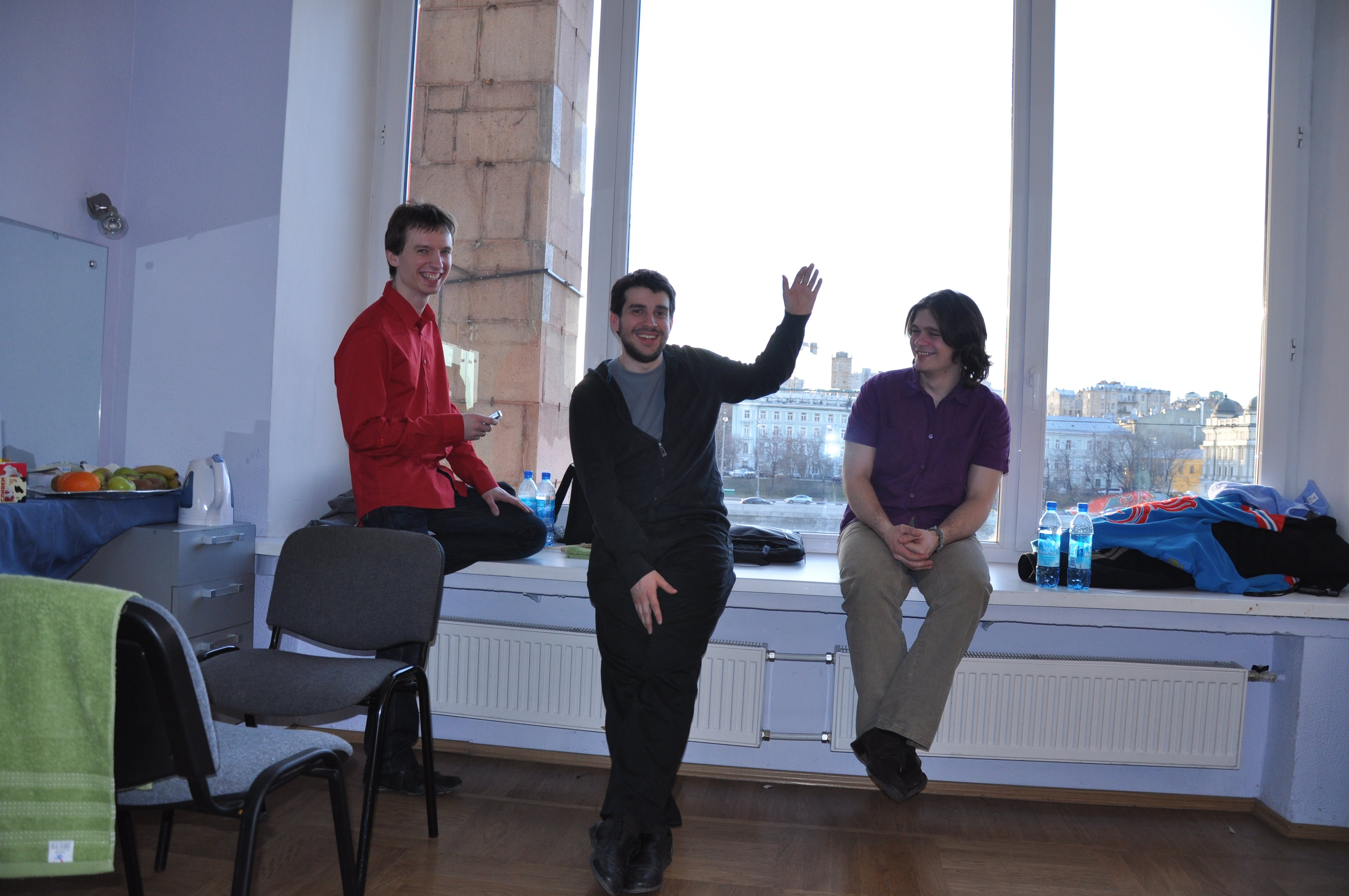
Peter Nalitch (centre)

=== Beginnings ===
In 2007 Peter already had about 40 songs written down, all available on his website for free. The band took the name Peter Nalitch's Musical Collective – "Muzykalny kollektiv Petra Nalitcha" ("Музыкальный коллектив Петра Налича") or more simply "MKPN" ("МКПН").

=== Success ===
Over the following two years, in addition to the Moscow venues, MKPN went on tour, performing in Saint Petersburg, Yekaterinburg, Nizhny Novgorod and other large Russian cities. The band released their first album in 2008 – "Radost Prostykh Melody" ("Радость простых мелодий" – translated as "The Joy of Simple Melodies" on their website). They also released a DVD of the footage of a concert in Moscow – "MKPN v B1 Maximum" ("МКПН в Б1 Maximum" – "MKPN at the B1 Maximum") and an EP, "More" ("Море" – "The Sea"). In 2009 the band was one of the headliners at the "Sfinks" festival in Antwerp (Belgium).

Nalitch is self-produced.

== Eurovision 2010 ==
Peter Nalitch and Friends was chosen to represent Russia in the Eurovision Song Contest 2010, in Oslo, with the song Lost and Forgotten. The final, on May 29, saw the song finishing 11th.

== Musical style ==
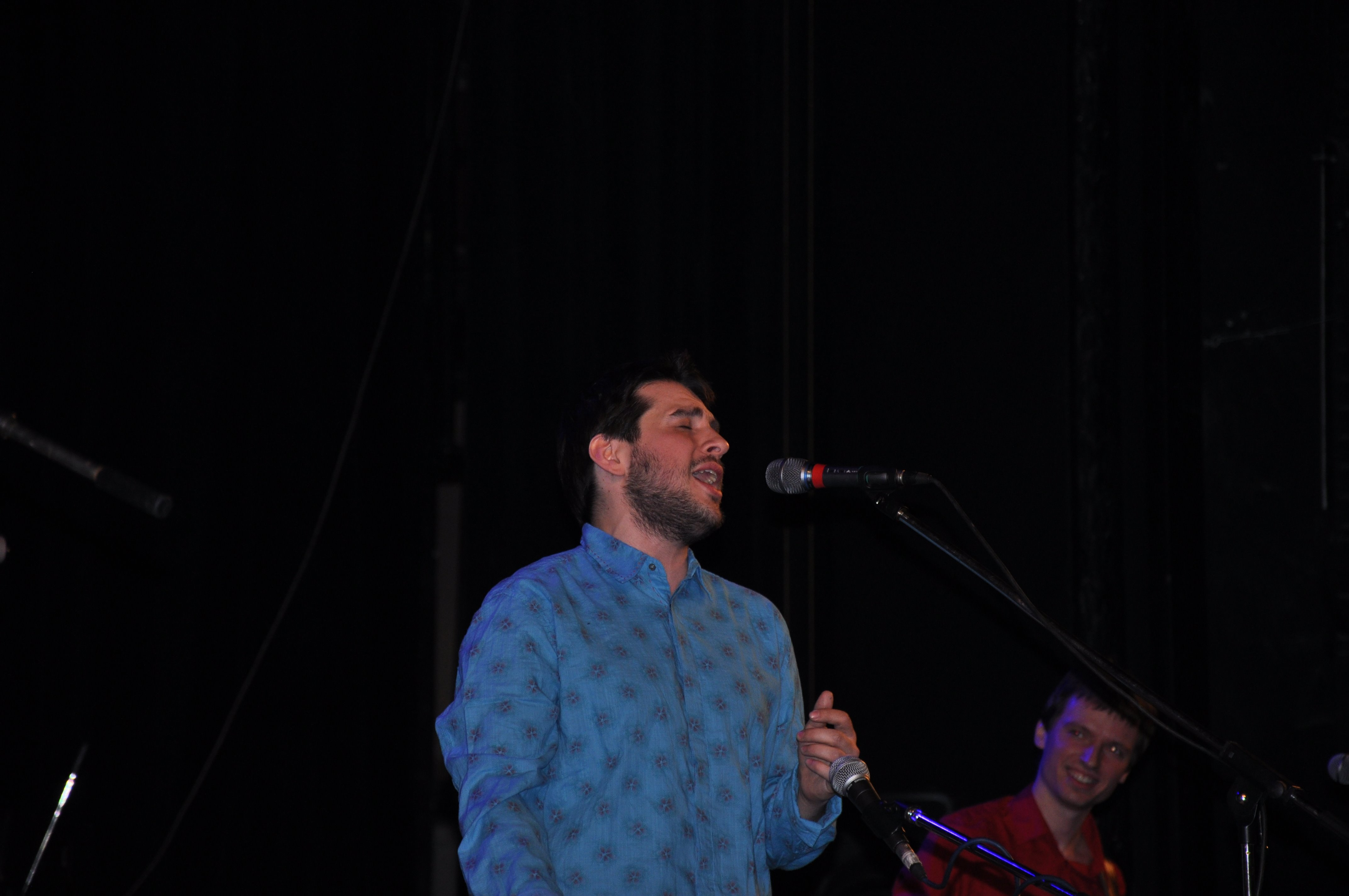
Peter Nalitch on stage

Peter Nalitch sings in Russian, English (the latter with a Russian accent, which he refuses to hide), Italian ("Santa Lucia"), French ("Il pleut toujours", on the EP "More") and Baburi, an invented language.

In the wake of this idea of self-promotion on the web, the band has given, on September 17, 2009, an acoustic concert from their own flat, broadcast live on RuTube (a local videohosting and live broadcasting site). On October 30, 2009, they broadcast another show live on RuTube, this time a real concert in Moscow.

== Band members ==
- Peter Nalitch – voice, guitar, piano, accordion
- Yura Kostenko – saxophone, flute, piano
- Sergei Sokolov – domra, guitar, voice
- Kostia Shvetsov – guitar
- Dima Simonov – bass
- Denis Marinkin – drums

== Discography ==
=== Albums ===
- 2008 – "Radost prostykh melody" ("Радость простых мелодий" – "The Joy of Simple Melodies")
- 2010 – "Vesyoliye Baburi" ("Весёлые Бабури" – "Jolly Baburi")

=== Live albums ===
- 2009 – "Kontsert MKPN v B1 Maximum" ("Концерт МКПН в Б1 Maximum" – Concert of MKPN at the B1 Maximum")

=== Singles, EP ===
- 2007 – Single of summer 2008 (with the magazine "Afisha" ("Афиша"))
- 2009 – EP "More" ("Море" – "The Sea")

=== International releases ===
- 2011 – Overseas (iTunes)

Awards and achievements
Preceded by Anastasia Prikhodko with "Mamo"	Russia in the Eurovision Song Contest; 2010	Succeeded by Alexey Vorobyov with Get You
