= Anna Cyzon =

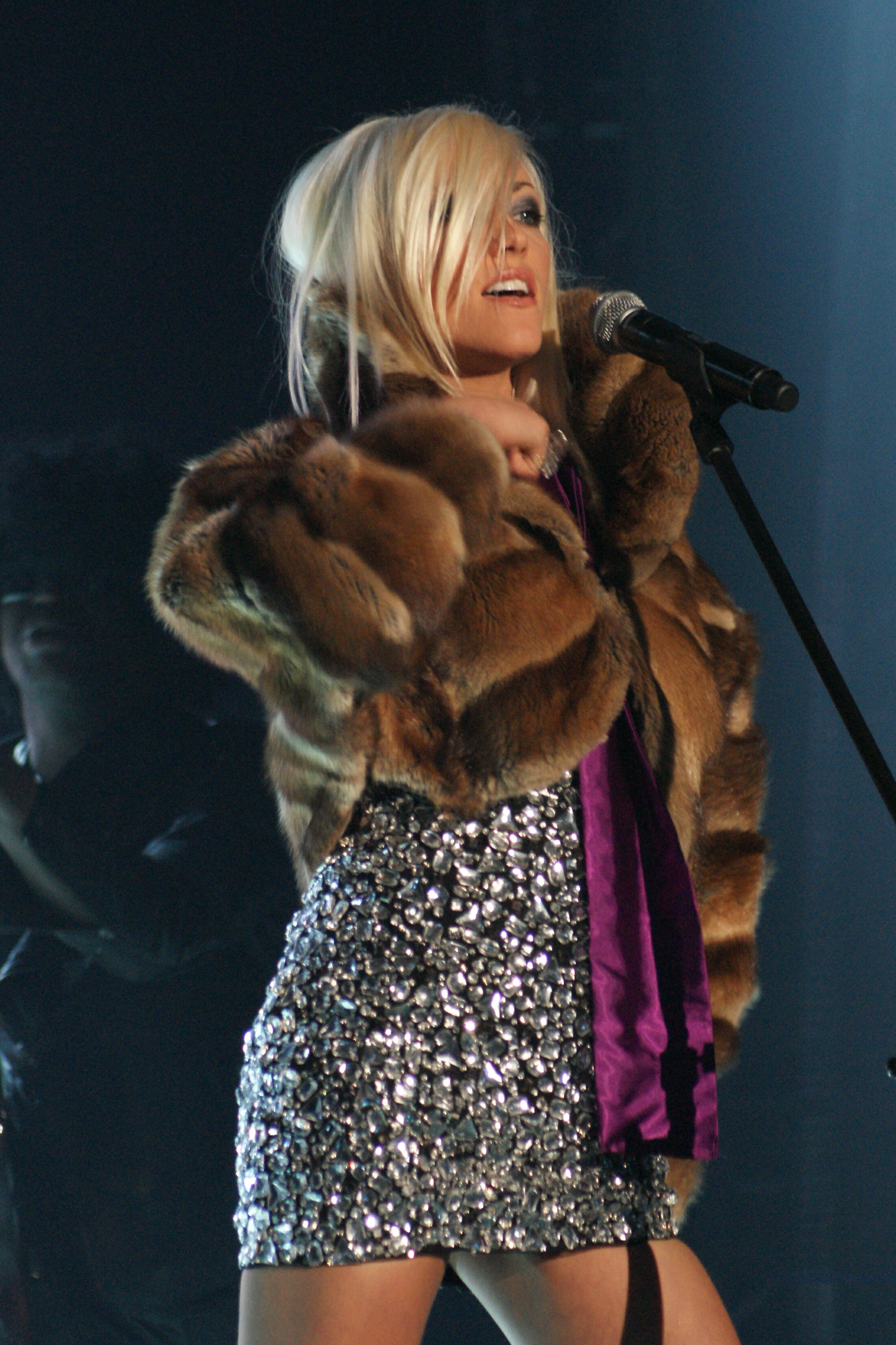
- Born: September 23, 1983 (age 41); Kraków, Poland
- Occupations: Singer; Lyricist; Actress
- Years active: 2004–present
- Musical career
- Website: annacyzon.com

Anna Cyzon (born Anna Czyszczoń in Kraków, Poland), is a Polish-Canadian recording artist, actress, former Canadian MTV/etalk personality and co-host of the Todd Shapiro show on Sirius Satellite Radio.

== Career ==
Cyzon's career in the media began when she auditioned for Canadian Idol in 2004. She reached the top 20.

Her performance on Idol landed her a position as a correspondent for CTV's eTalk, where she worked for two years, making a move to MTV Canada in 2006. While hosting her own shows, MTV e2 and MTV Screen, she continued to work as an on-air correspondent for eTalk.

Returning to her love of music, Cyzon wrote and shot her first music video for "Reputation" (Produced by K-Cut of Main Source) with director and fashion photographer Miz Monday.

In July 2009, Cyzon independently released her first single "Young Boy" in Canada. The song beat out Black Eyed Peas on Ottawa's HOT 89.9 Battle of the Beats and was played on college radio stations across Canada. The video, directed by Juno Award nominee Davin Black and shot on the old EMI publishing rooftop in Toronto, was played on MuchMusic, MuchMore and MTV Canada.

During the editing of the video, Cyzon was approached by Gene Simmons of Kiss (band), who flew her out to Los Angeles to sign as the first artist to his new label venture with Belinda Stronach and Universal Music Canada, Simmons Records. Cyzon declined the offer returning to finish work on her debut album which she would later release independently on iTunes.

In February 2010, Cyzon placed second in the Polish preselections for the Eurovision Song Contest 2010 with "Love Me", a song she co wrote with NYC based producer Jason Gleed. In May of the same year she returned to Poland, performing "Love Me" at the annual Top Trendy Festival in Sopot.

Cyzon has since made her debut on the big screen, appearing in Warren P. Sonoda's Unrivaled starring UFC champion Rashad Evans. She also appeared in the 2010 Canadian television film based on the popular Degrassi series, Degrassi Takes Manhattan. She plays Erin in the Canadian film Textuality, starring Jason Lewis, Carly Pope and Eric McCormack, directed by Warren P. Sonoda.

In 2013, Cyzon released "Into The Sun" off her self-titled EP, produced by longtime friend, collaborator and guitar player, Mike Schlosser. Cyzon returned to work with Davin Black on the controversial music video for the single, which was not added to rotation to either Much Music or Much More Music due to its violent content.

Following the release of her EP, Cyzon returned to the studio to collaborate with British producer Alex Reid, and in November 2014 she released her new single "Wannabe" through FMLY on Universal Music Group Canada.

Later on, in 2015, she collaborated with trance music duo Eminence on "Knock Me Out", released on Monstercat.

== Personal life ==
Cyzon immigrated to Canada with her family in 1990. She attended Bishop Allen Academy, followed by the University of Toronto where she obtained a Bachelor of Arts in Criminology and a minor in Philosophy and Sociology.

She teaches Yoga.

== Singles ==
| Year | Single |
|---|---|
| 2009 | Young Boy |
| 2009 | Reputation |
| 2010 | Love Me |
| 2014 | Wannabe |
| 2015 | Knock Me Out (with Eminence) |
