= Taras Topolia =

Ukrainian singer (born 1987)

- Тарас Тополя
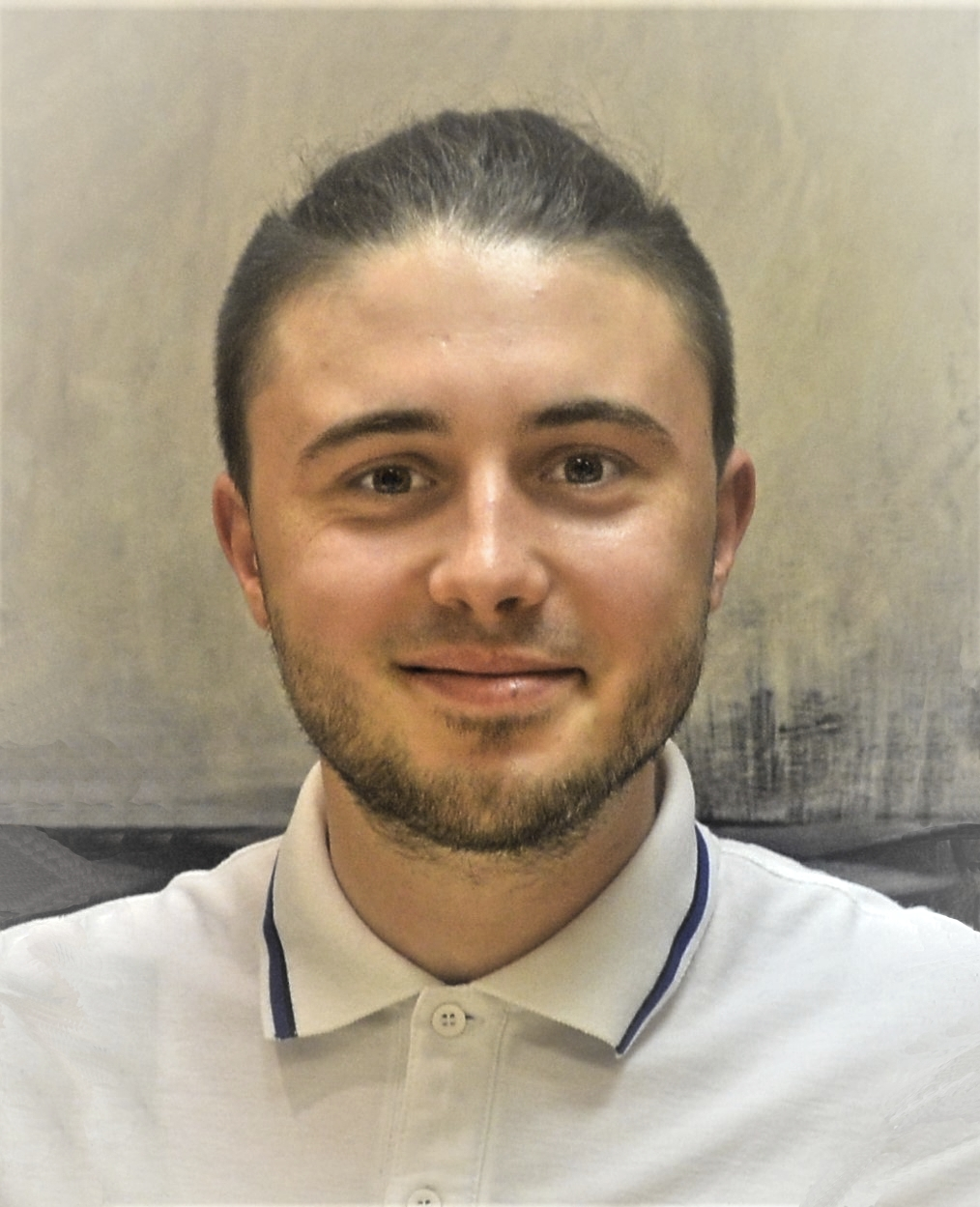
- Topolia in 2016
- Born: 21 June 1987 (age 39); Kyiv, Ukrainian SSR, Soviet Union
- Education: National Academy of Internal Affairs
- Spouse: Olena Topolia (m. 2013–2026)
- Children: 3
- Musical career
- Genre: Pop rock
- Instrument: Vocals
- Years active: 2005–present
- Member of: Antytila
- Military career
- Allegiance: Ukraine
- Branch: Territorial Defence Forces
- Service years: 2022
- Unit: 130th Territorial Defence Battalion
- Conflicts: Russian invasion of Ukraine

Taras Volodymyrovych Topolia (Ukrainian: Тарас Володимирович Тополя; born 21 June 1987) is a Ukrainian singer best known as the lead vocalist of the band Antytila. He has also served as a spokesman for the Youth Council under the President of Ukraine and as a former UNICEF Youth Ambassador. In addition to his musical career, Topolia is a volunteer, a former member of the Territorial Defence Forces (TDF), and the co-founder of the charitable foundations Free-UA and Antytila.

== Early life and education ==
Taras Volodymyrovych Topolia was born on 21 June 1987 in Kyiv, the capital of Ukraine. At the age of six, he started taking music lessons, joining the Revutsky Men's Choir and learning to play the violin. After attending Gymnasium No. 48 on Prorizna Street, he went on to Kyiv's Secondary School No. 8. He started a band in high school that would eventually become Antytila. Topolia continued his education at the National Academy of Internal Affairs, where he graduated in 2007 with a law degree. He appeared on the TV talent program Shans with his band Antytila while still a student. Andriy Kuzmenko said, despite their defeat: "If we let these guys on stage, many others will have to retire."

== Career ==
In addition to being an author and performer, Taras Topolia is the leader and co-founder of the band Antytila. The group began collaborating with the Catapult Music production centre in 2008, but chose to part ways with the company in 2010. Since then, Topolia and Antytila's pianist, Serhiy Vusyk, have jointly managed the band.

=== War in Donbas ===
Topolia began volunteering in 2014 and co-founded the Free-UA charitable foundation with close friends in response to Russia's annexation of Crimea and the outbreak of war in Donbas. Through the foundation, he helped raise nearly ₴8 million, which was used to support civilians and purchase medical supplies and protective gear for Ukrainian soldiers. In December 2015, he spoke about his role as curator of the "Ukraine EXISTS" exhibition, which aimed to highlight the war and promote contemporary Ukrainian art. The exhibition, designed to showcase the nation's resilience amid conflict, was funded through public donations after the Ukrainian government declined to provide financial support.

In 2017, Topolia and his band Antytila launched the "Sonce" (Sun) nationwide tour in support of their fifth album, released in December 2016. The tour spanned nearly 40 cities across Ukraine, including frontline regions such as Sievierodonetsk, Pokrovsk, Kramatorsk, and Mariupol, bringing their music and message of unity to audiences directly affected by the ongoing war.

Topolia starred in Antytila's steampunk-inspired music video Кіно ("Movie"), which was filmed over five days in the Oleshky Sands in 2020. As part of his months-long preparation for the role, he learned to juggle and wore an elaborate costume adorned with 5 kilograms (11 lb) of jewellery. He co-developed the concept and script with director Serhii Vusyk, wrote the lyrics, and was closely involved in both the creative and logistical planning of the ambitious production. The video featured over 100 performers, multiple costume designers, and collaborations with leading Ukrainian illusionists.

That same year, Topolia participated in the Truth – Untruth project, serving as a presenter in a series of video explainers designed to debunk Russian propaganda surrounding the war in Donbas. Working alongside other well-known Ukrainian artists and media personalities, he helped dismantle common myths and shed light on how public opinion can be manipulated, contributing to the wider national effort to combat disinformation.

=== Russian invasion of Ukraine ===
Topolia and other members of the Antytila band joined the TDF of the Armed Forces of Ukraine following Russian invasion of Ukraine on 24 February 2022. To serve on the front line, he and his bandmates Vusyk and Dmytro Zholud put down their instruments and took up arms. They enlisted in the 130th Battalion of the TDF as paramedics, providing first aid and saving the lives of wounded soldiers. While Topolia served on the front line, the foundation he co-founded focused on three key priorities: supplying military support (including defence, intelligence, and medical aid), supporting the families of fallen soldiers, and repairing military vehicles.

On 22 August 2022, the song 2step—a collaboration between Topolia and Ed Sheeran—was released and performed together in Poland. It paid tribute to the millions of Ukrainians whose families were torn apart by Russian bombings and missile strikes. That same year, Topolia also performed with Bono and The Edge of U2, calling on the world to support and stand with Ukraine. After serving on the front line for seven months, he was able to return to Kyiv in October 2022 and soon after flew to the United States to reunite with his wife and children.

In 2023, Topolia is still performing well internationally while putting Ukraine's independence first. He and his band gather money to equip Ukrainian military and assist their unit through charity concerts. He sees music as a weapon in the struggle for liberty. Platforms like Eurovision, which draw power from international backing, especially from the United Kingdom, whose solidarity has profoundly impacted Topolia during the war, are crucial for conveying Ukraine's message, according to Topolia. He was a candidate for the jury of Ukraine's national selection for the Eurovision Song Contest 2023.

== Political positions ==
The brutal realities of war and the significance of responsibility and integrity in Ukraine's military forces are highlighted by Topolia in 2014. He acknowledges the risks and sacrifices that soldiers must make, but he also advocates for openness regarding matters such as the abuse of volunteer assistance. He highlighted that volunteers must speak the truth, even if it makes them uncomfortable, in order to maintain accountability and public trust, and he believes that the efforts of honourable troops should be respected over material considerations.

== Personal life ==
Topolia married singer Olena Kucher, known professionally as Alyosha, in 2013. Together, they have three children: a daughter, Maria, and two sons, Mark and Roman. The family lived in Kyiv, but when the war broke out in 2022, it became too dangerous to remain in the capital. Like many others, their wives and children initially relocated to western Ukraine for safety before eventually moving abroad. Topolia’s wife and children now live in New Jersey, where they are staying with his mother and stepfather.

Taras Topolia and Olena officially divorced in early 2026 after 12 years of marriage. The couple announced their decision to separate in early December 2025, and the court formally finalized their divorce in early 2026.

== Honours and awards ==
Topolia has been awarded the following:

- Order of Merit Third Class (2019)
- Merited Artist of Ukraine (2026)
