= Russia in the Eurovision Song Contest 2010 =

- Eurovision Song Contest 2010
- Country: Russia
- Selection process: Evrovidenie 2010
- Selection date: 7 March 2010

Competing entry
- Song: "Lost and Forgotten"
- Artist: Peter Nalitch and Friends
- Songwriters: Peter Nalitch

Placement
- Semi-final result: Qualified (7th, 74 points)
- Final result: 11th, 90 points

Participation chronology

Russia was represented at the Eurovision Song Contest 2010 with the song "Lost and Forgotten", written by Peter Nalitch and performed by Peter Nalitch and Friends. The Russian entry was selected through a national final, Evrovidenie 2010 (Russian: Евровидение 2010) organised by the Russian broadcaster Rossiya Channel (RTR). Russia qualified from the first semi-final and placed 11th in the final with 90 points scored.

== Before Eurovision ==
=== Evrovidenie 2010 ===
Evrovidenie 2010 was the sixth edition of Evrovidenie, the music competition that selects Russia's entry for the Eurovision Song Contest. The show took place on 7 March 2010 at the Vladimir Nazarov's Theater in Moscow and hosted by Oxana Fedorova and Dmitry Guberniev. Twenty-five artists and songs participated and the winner was selected through a jury and a public televote. The show was broadcast on Russia-1, RTR-Planeta as well as online via the official Eurovision Song Contest website eurovision.tv.

==== Competing entries ====
On 9 December 2009, RTR announced a submission period for interested artists and composers to submit their entries until 15 February 2010. In addition to the public submissions, the broadcaster reserved the right to directly invite artists to compete in the national final as wildcards. The broadcaster received over 1,000 submissions at the conclusion of the deadline, one of them being from Eurovision Song Contest 2008 winner Dima Bilan who submitted the song "White Nights", composed by 1995 Russian Eurovision entrant Philipp Kirkorov. 35 entries were selected from the received submissions to proceed to auditions held on 1 March 2010 at the Vladimir Nazarov's Theater in Moscow where a jury panel selected the twenty-five finalists for the national final. The competing acts were announced on 2 March 2010 and did not include Bilan. Bilan's producer Yana Rudkovskaya later stated that the absence was a mutual decision between Bilan, Kirkorov and Rudkovskaya herself.

Auditions - 1 March 2010
Artist	Song
Alaska	"Piastry" (Пиастры)
Aleksandr Panayotov	"Maya Showtime"
Alissandra	Unknown
Alyona Roxis	"My Tears"
Ana	"Dva golosa" (Два голоса)
Antonello Carozza	"Senza respiro"
Blondrock	"War is Bad"
Buranovskiye Babushki	"Dlinnaya-dlinnaya beresta i kak sdelat' iz neyo aishon" (Длинная-длинная береста и как сделать из нее айшон)
Ed Shulzhevskiy	"Without You"
Ekaterina Frolova	"Tout va bien"
Elena Esenina	"Mir bez tebya" (Мир без тебя)
Jam	Unknown
Jay Stever	"I Love, I Love, I Love You"
Jet Kids	"Hey Say"
Julia Voice (Note: Julia withdrew her entry for unknown reasons)	Unknown
Los Devchatos	"Chocolate"
Miusha	"Big Bang"
Nano	"Take It Away"
Natali Damas and L'brand	"Much Closer"
Natalia Terekhova	"Everything"
Oleg Bezinskih	"Crowning"
Para-Bellum	"Ptitsa" (Птица)
Pavla	"Infatuated"
Peter Nalitch Band	"Lost and Forgotten"
Petya Palkin Project	"I Don't Care"
Plazma	"Mystery (The Power Within)"
Polina Kozhikova	"For You"
Princessa Avenue	"Lovers"
Pyotr Suhov	"Ya uletayu" (Я улетаю)
Rene	"It's All About Love"
Scenakardia	"Styokla" (Стёкла)
Vyacheslav Terekhov	Unknown
YoYO (Note: The group was forced to withdraw their entry from the selection, because on the eve of the audition, its soloist seriously injured her leg during a dance rehearsal.)	Unknown
Yulika	"Delete"
Z.I.M.A.	"Indeets" (Индеец)

Artist	Song	Songwriter(s)
Alaska	"Piastry" (Пиастры)	Alaska
Aleksandr Panayotov	"Maya Showtime"	Aleksandr Panayotov, DJ Sandrique, Natalia Povolotskaya
Alyona Roxis	"My Tears"	Anton Shaplin, Vyacheslav Lungu
Ana	"Dva golosa" (Два голоса)	Vladimir Pochitalin
Antonello Carozza	"Senza respiro"	Antonello Carozza
Buranovskiye Babushki	"Dlinnaya-dlinnaya beresta i kak sdelat' iz neyo aishon" (Длинная-длинная береста и как сделать из нее айшон)	Elizaveta Zarbatova
Ed Shulzhevskiy	"Without You"	Diana Polenova, Artur Sarkisyan
Ekaterina Frolova	"Tout va bien"	Alexander Semin
Elena Esenina	"Mir bez tebya" (Мир без тебя)	Elena Esenina
Jay Stever	"I Love, I Love, I Love You"	Jānis Stībelis
Jet Kids	"Hey Say"	Alina Ershovy, Maria Ershovy, Tonya Karpinskaya
Los Devchatos	"Chocolate"	Anastasia Chevazhevskaya, Viktoria Zhuk, Anastasia Spiridonova
Miusha	"Big Bang"	M-clis, Miusha
Nano	"Take It Away"	Jock-E, Nervo
Natalia Terekhova	"Everything"	Natalia Terekhova
Natalya Damas and L'brand	"Much Closer"	Dmitry Pereskokov, Francesca Orbek
Oleg Bezinskih	"Crowning"	Oleg Bezinskih, Taras Demchuk
Para-Bellum	"Ptitsa" (Птица)	Ilya Tarasov
Pavla	"Infatuated"	Diana Joselle, Rachael Leslie, Alf Tuohey
Peter Nalitch Band	"Lost and Forgotten"	Peter Nalitch
Polina Kozhikova	"For You"	Polina Kozhikova, Vladimir Nazarov
Princessa Avenue	"Lovers"	Valery Drobysh, Elena Phillipova
Pyotr Sukhov	"Ya uletayu" (Я улетаю)	Pyotr Sukhov, Aleksandr Zhidkov
Scenakardia	"Styokla" (Стёкла)	Alexey Martynov, Timofey Khazanov
Yulika	"Delete"	Svetlana Kulyomina, Yulia Starostina

==== Final ====
The final took place on 7 March 2010. Twenty-five entries competed and the winner, "Lost and Forgotten" performed by Peter Nalitch Band, was determined through a 50/50 combination of votes from a jury panel and public televoting. The jury consisted of Andrey Demidov (general director of Muz-TV), Igor Krutoy (composer), Gennady Gokhshtein (executive entertainment producer of Russia-1), Maxim Fadeev (composer and producer) and Sergey Arhipov (deputy director of Radio Mayak). In addition to the performances of the competing entries, Dima Bilan and Eurovision Song Contest 2009 winner Alexander Rybak performed as guests.

Final – 7 March 2010
R/O	Artist	Song	Points	Place
1	Princessa Avenue	"Lovers"	7.2	14
2	Jay Stever	"I Love, I Love, I Love You"	3.9	21
3	Ana	"Dva golosa"	10.1	7
4	Miusha	"Big Bang"	3.4	22
5	Para-Bellum	"Ptitsa"	8.6	10
6	Pyotr Sukhov	"Ya uletayu"	1.6	25
7	Oleg Bezinskikh	"Crowning"	16.1	2
8	Natalia Terekhova	"Everything"	6.3	17
9	Jet Kids	"Hey Say"	11.8	4
10	Pavla	"Infatuated"	10.9	5
11	Ekaterina Frolova	"Tout va bien"	4.4	20
12	Ed Shulzhevskiy	"Without You"	8.2	11
13	Peter Nalitch Band	"Lost and Forgotten"	20.9	1
14	Buranovskiye Babushki	"Dlinnaya-dlinnaya beresta i kak sdelat' iz neyo aishon"	12.9	3
15	Aleksandr Panayotov	"Maya Showtime"	10.6	6
16	Nano	"Take It Away"	5.1	19
17	Natalya Damas and L'brand	"Much Closer"	9.2	9
18	Alyona Roxis	"My Tears"	2.0	24
19	Antonello Carozza	"Senza respiro"	9.4	8
20	Polina Kozhikova	"For You"	5.8	18
21	Los Devchatos	"Chocolate"	7.5	13
22	Yulika	"Delete"	6.6	16
23	Elena Esenina	"Mir bez tebya"	7.9	12
24	Alaska	"Piastry"	2.7	23
25	Scenakardia	"Styokla"	6.9	15

== At Eurovision ==
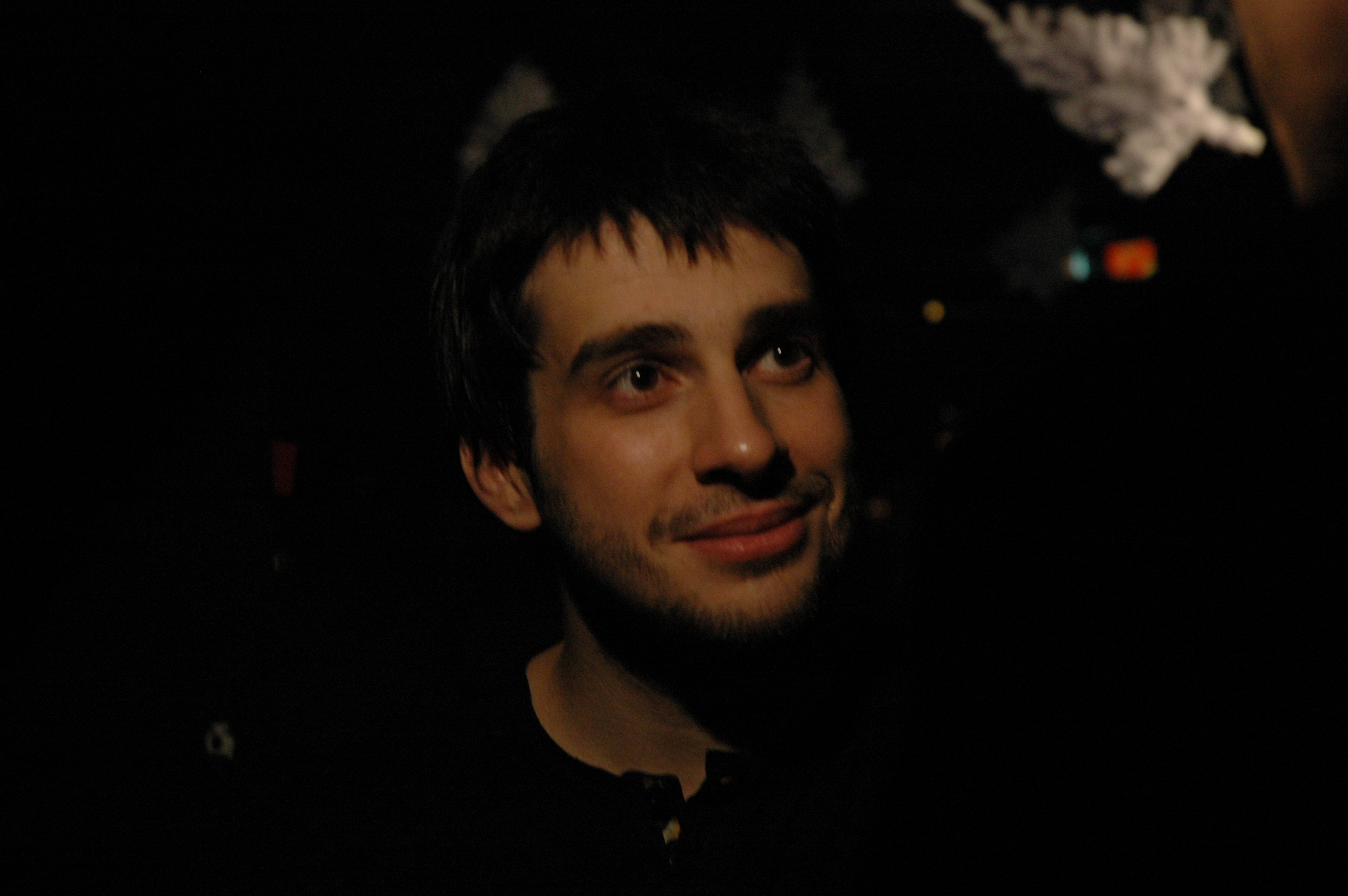
Peter Nalitch in 2008

Russia competed in the first semi-final of the contest, on 25 May 2010. Though it looks that the success of Russia in the Semi-Final voting caused a matter of contention as there was prominent booing during the television broadcast of the first semi final and the show itself. This booing was noted by commentators at the time of broadcast as it was hard to ignore.

In the semi-final Russia came 7th with 74 points, and thus qualified for the final. The public awarded Russia 4th place with 92 points and the jury awarded 14th place with 41 points. In the final Russia came 11th with 90 points, with the public awarding Russia 11th place with 107 points and the jury awarding 15th place with 63 points.

=== Voting ===
==== Points awarded to Russia ====
Points awarded to Russia (Semi-final 1)
Score	Country
12 points	Belarus; Estonia; Moldova
10 points	Latvia
8 points	Poland
7 points	
6 points	
5 points	Belgium
4 points	Serbia
3 points	Finland; Greece
2 points	Bosnia and Herzegovina
1 point	Germany; Malta; Portugal

Points awarded to Russia (Final)
Score	Country
12 points	Belarus
10 points	Armenia; Estonia; Israel; Moldova; Ukraine
8 points	Latvia
7 points	
6 points	Slovakia
5 points	Lithuania
4 points	Turkey
3 points	Azerbaijan
2 points	Portugal
1 point	

==== Points awarded by Russia ====
Points awarded by Russia (Semi-final 1)
Score	Country
12 points	Belarus
10 points	Belgium
8 points	Iceland
7 points	Greece
6 points	Poland
5 points	Moldova
4 points	Serbia
3 points	Finland
2 points	Bosnia and Herzegovina
1 point	Macedonia

Points awarded by Russia (Final)
Score	Country
12 points	Armenia
10 points	Georgia
8 points	Azerbaijan
7 points	Ukraine
6 points	Germany
5 points	Belgium
4 points	Spain
3 points	Romania
2 points	Belarus
1 point	Denmark
