= Armenia in the Eurovision Song Contest 2010 =

- Eurovision Song Contest 2010
- Participating broadcaster: Public Television of Armenia (AMPTV)
- Country: Armenia
- Selection process: Evrotesil 2010
- Selection date: 14 February 2010

Competing entry
- Song: "Apricot Stone"
- Artist: Eva Rivas
- Songwriters: Armen Martirosyan; Karen Kavaleryan

Placement
- Semi-final result: Qualified (6th, 83 points)
- Final result: 7th, 141 points

Participation chronology

Armenia was represented at the Eurovision Song Contest 2010 with the song "Apricot Stone", written by Armen Martirosyan and Karen Kavaleryan, and performed by Eva Rivas. The Armenian participating broadcaster, Public Television of Armenia (AMPTV), selected its entry through the national final Evrotesil 2010. The national final took place on 14 February 2010 where ten entries competed. "Apricot Stone" performed by Eva Rivas was selected as the winner following the combination of votes from a professional jury and a public televote.

Armenia was drawn to compete in the second semi-final of the Eurovision Song Contest which took place on 27 May 2010. Performing during the show in position 2, "Apricot Stone" was announced among the top 10 entries of the second semi-final and therefore qualified to compete in the final on 29 May. It was later revealed that Armenia placed sixth out of the 17 participating countries in the semi-final with 83 points. In the final, Armenia performed in position 21 and placed seventh out of the 25 participating countries with 141 points.

== Background ==
Prior to the 2010 contest, Public Television of Armenia (AMPTV) had participated in the Eurovision Song Contest representing Armenia four times since its first entry in 2006. Since 2006, all of Armenia's entries have featured in the final. Its highest placing in the contest, to this point, has been fourth place, which the nation achieved in 2008 with the song "Qélé, Qélé" performed by Sirusho. In 2009, "Jan Jan" performed by the duo Inga and Anush placed tenth in the final.

As part of its duties as participating broadcaster, AMPTV organises the selection of its entry in the Eurovision Song Contest and broadcasts the event in the country. The broadcaster confirmed its intentions to participate at the 2010 contest on 13 December 2009. AMPTV has used various methods to select its entry in the past, such as a live televised national final to choose the performer, song or both to compete at Eurovision. However internal selections have also been held on occasion. In 2009, it organized a national final to select both the artist and the song, a selection procedure that continued for the 2010 entry.

== Before Eurovision ==
=== Evrotesil 2010 ===
Evrotesil 2010 was the national final that selected the Armenian entry for the Eurovision Song Contest 2010. The competition took place on 14 February 2010 at the Yerevan Opera Theatre in Yerevan, hosted by Gohar Gasparyan and Khoren Levonyan. Nine entries competed and the winner was determined by the combination of votes from a professional jury and a public vote. The show was broadcast on Channel 1.

==== Competing entries ====
On 18 December 2009, AMPTV announced a submission period with a deadline of 1 February 2010. Artists were required to be of Armenian citizenship, while songwriters worldwide were able to submit songs. The broadcaster received 30 entries at the closing of the deadline. A jury panel consisting of members of the AMPTV creative board assessed the received submissions and marked each entry with a score up to 20 based on the following criteria: quality of the composition, quality of the lyrics and the vocal ability of the performer. The top ten entries were selected to proceed to the national final, which were announced on 4 February 2010. On 10 February 2010, Sonya withdrew her song "Never" from the national final due to health problems.

==== Final ====
The final took place on 14 February 2010. Nine entries competed and the winner, "Apricot Stone" performed by Eva Rivas, was selected by the 50/50 combination of votes from a professional jury and a public vote. In addition to the performances of the competing entries, the show was opened by Armenian Eurovision 2009 entrants Inga and Anush with "You Will Not Be Alone", while the interval acts featured Swiss Eurovision 1956 winner Lys Assia with "Refrain" and "September im Burgund", Armenian Eurovision 2006 entrant André with "In Your Hands", Armenian Eurovision 2008 entrant Sirusho with "Havatum em" and Armenian 2009 Junior Eurovision entrant Luara Hayrapetyan with "Barcelona".

R/O	Artist	Song	Songwriter(s)	Jury	Televote		Total	Place
R/O	Artist	Song	Songwriter(s)	Jury	Votes	Points	Total	Place
1	Another Story	"Ays dzmer" (Այս ձմեռ)	Armen Sargsyan	3	—	7	10	5
2	Ani Arzumanyan	"The Mermaid Song"	Arsen Nersisyan	8	—	6	14	4
3	Meline Beglaryan	"We Must Believe"	Meline Beglaryan	5	—	3	8	6
4	Emmy and Mihran	"Hey (Let Me Hear You Say)"	Vache Ter-Yeghishyan, Mihran Kirakosyan	12	10,400	8	20	2
5	David Ashotyan	"Infected Dreams"	David Ashotyan	2	—	5	7	9
6	Nick Egibyan	"Countdown"	Nick Egibyan	6	—	2	8	6
7	Maria Kizirian	"Little Red Riding Hood"	Maria Kizirian	4	—	4	8	6
8	Razmik Amyan	"My Love"	Vahram Petrosyan, Vardan Zadoyan	7	10,500	10	17	3
9	Eva Rivas	"Apricot Stone"	Armen Martirosyan, Karen Kavaleryan	10	22,000	12	22	1

=== Promotion ===
Prior to the contest, Eva Rivas specifically promoted "Apricot Stone" as the Armenian Eurovision entry on 18 April 2010 by performing during the Armenia Tashir Awards which was held in Moscow, Russia. Rivas also took part in promotional activities in Belgium where she appeared during the TV Limburg talk show Studio TVL and performed during the Pink Nation event which was held in Antwerp on 30 April. She was also a guest in the first Ukrainian national final

== At Eurovision ==
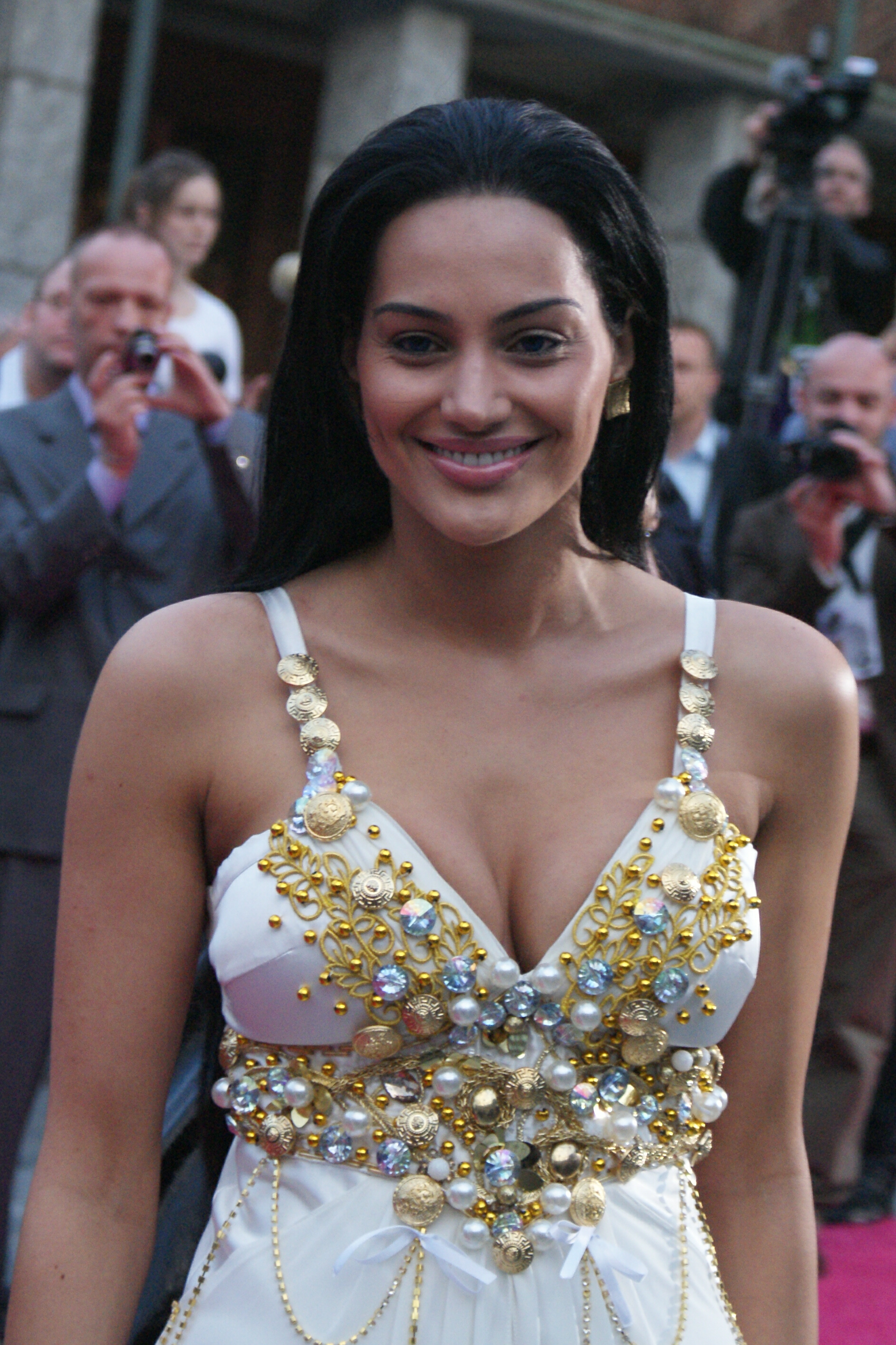
Eva Rivas at the Eurovision Opening Party in Oslo

All countries except the "Big Four" (France, Germany, Spain and the United Kingdom), and the host country, were required to qualify from one of two semi-finals in order to compete for the final; the top ten countries from each semi-final progress to the final. The European Broadcasting Union (EBU) split up the competing countries into six different pots based on voting patterns from previous contests, with countries with favourable voting histories put into the same pot. On 7 February 2010, a special allocation draw was held which placed each country into one of the two semi-finals, as well as which half of the show they would perform in. Armenia was placed into the second semi-final, to be held on 27 May 2010, and was scheduled to perform in the first half of the show. The running order for the semi-finals was decided through another draw on 23 March 2010 and Armenia was set to perform in position 2, following the entry from Lithuania and before the entry from Israel.

In Armenia, the two semi-finals and the final were broadcast on Channel 1 with commentary by Hrachuhi Utmazyan and Khoren Levonyan. The Armenian spokesperson, who announced the Armenian votes during the final, was Nazeni Hovhannisyan.

=== Semi-final ===
Eva Rivas took part in technical rehearsals on 16 and 21 May, followed by dress rehearsals on 26 and 27 May. This included the jury show on 26 May where the professional juries of each country watched and voted on the competing entries.

The Armenian performance featured Eva Rivas dressed in a white outfit consisting of white jeans and a long apricot-coloured corset performing on stage together with three backing vocalists, a dancer and a duduk player who sat on a stone throughout the performance. The stage presentation included an apricot stone placed behind Rivas who also held a pendant in the shape of an apricot stone on her palm, an artificial waterfall and an apricot tree which later appeared after the dancer approached the waterfall and watered the apricot stone with a vase. The stage lighting displayed orange colours and included smoke and pyrotechnic effects throughout the performance. The backing vocalists that joined Eva Rivas on stage were: Gor Sujyan, Mariam Merabova and Tigran Petrosyan. The dancer was Artem Dervoed and the duduk player was Djivan Gasparyan.

At the end of the show, Armenia was announced as having finished in the top 10 and subsequently qualifying for the grand final. It was later revealed that Armenia placed sixth in the semi-final, receiving a total of 83 points.

=== Final ===
Shortly after the second semi-final, a winners' press conference was held for the ten qualifying countries. As part of this press conference, the qualifying artists took part in a draw to determine the running order for the final. This draw was done in the order the countries were announced during the semi-final. Armenia was drawn to perform in position 21, following the entry from Russia and before the entry from Germany.

Eva Rivas once again took part in dress rehearsals on 28 and 29 May before the final, including the jury final where the professional juries cast their final votes before the live show. Eva Rivas performed a repeat of her semi-final performance during the final on 29 May. Armenia placed seventh in the final, scoring 141 points.

=== Voting ===
Voting during the three shows consisted of 50 percent public televoting and 50 percent from a jury deliberation. The jury consisted of five music industry professionals who were citizens of the country they represent. This jury was asked to judge each contestant based on: vocal capacity; the stage performance; the song's composition and originality; and the overall impression by the act. In addition, no member of a national jury could be related in any way to any of the competing acts in such a way that they cannot vote impartially and independently.

Following the release of the full split voting by the EBU after the conclusion of the competition, it was revealed that Armenia had placed fourth with the public televote and tenth with the jury vote in the final. In the public vote, Armenia scored 166 points, while with the jury vote, Armenia scored 116 points. In the second semi-final, Armenia placed sixth with the public televote with 90 points and fifth with the jury vote, scoring 84 points.

Below is a breakdown of points awarded to Armenia and awarded by Armenia in the second semi-final and grand final of the contest. The nation awarded its 12 points to Georgia in the semi-final and the final of the contest.

==== Points awarded to Armenia ====
Points awarded to Armenia (Semi-final 2)
Score	Country
12 points	Cyprus; Israel
10 points	Georgia; Netherlands; Romania
8 points	Bulgaria; Ukraine
7 points	
6 points	
5 points	Sweden
4 points	Turkey
3 points	Switzerland
2 points	
1 point	Lithuania

Points awarded to Armenia (Final)
Score	Country
12 points	Israel; Netherlands; Russia
10 points	Georgia
8 points	Bulgaria; Spain
7 points	Belgium; Cyprus; Germany; Greece
6 points	France; Moldova; Romania; Turkey; Ukraine
5 points	Belarus; Poland
4 points	Macedonia; Slovakia
3 points	
2 points	
1 point	Latvia; Serbia; Sweden

==== Points awarded by Armenia ====
Points awarded by Armenia (Semi-final 2)
Score	Country
12 points	Georgia
10 points	Ukraine
8 points	Israel
7 points	Croatia
6 points	Cyprus
5 points	Denmark
4 points	Romania
3 points	Sweden
2 points	Lithuania
1 point	Ireland

Points awarded by Armenia (Final)
Score	Country
12 points	Georgia
10 points	Russia
8 points	Ukraine
7 points	Spain
6 points	France
5 points	Denmark
4 points	Portugal
3 points	Greece
2 points	Norway
1 point	Romania
