= Sweet People =

2010 single by Alyosha

Single by Alyosha
- Released: 2010
- Recorded: 2010
- Genre: Alternative rock, post-grunge
- Length: 3:00
- Songwriters: Olena Kucher; Borys Kukoba; Vadim Lisitsa

Eurovision Song Contest 2010 entry
- Country: Ukraine
- Artist: Alyosha
- Language: English
- Composers: Olena Kucher; Borys Kukoba; Vadim Lisitsa
- Lyricist: Olena Kucher

Finals performance
- Semi-final result: 7th
- Semi-final points: 77
- Final result: 10th
- Final points: 108

Entry chronology
- ◄ "Be My Valentine!" (2009)
- "Angel" (2011) ►

"Sweet People" is a song by Ukrainian singer Alyosha. It was the Ukrainian entry for the Eurovision Song Contest 2010 in Oslo, Norway. At first, a song performed by Vasyl Lazarovich was intended to represent Ukraine at Eurovision, but a new national final was held due to the broadcasting network's internal selection of Lazarovich. Alyosha won the new final with "To Be Free", but it was disqualified since it had previously been released. "Sweet People" was then chosen to represent Ukraine. The song finished tenth in the Eurovision final, receiving 108 points.

== Writing and inspiration ==
"Sweet People" is written by Alyosha, and composed by Alyosha, Borys Kukoba and Vadim Lisitsa. Alyosha chose the environmental topic because she wanted to "talk to a big audience about saving our planet." Alyosha is "convinced that world leaders are capable of solving most global environmental problems but lack political will." She hopes that her song and the music video will reach out to policy and decision makers, and will "prompt them to take action on global environment."

Alyosha started a program called Ecovision, and she hoped that the program would remind world leaders about the environment and "their duty to not only talk the environmental talk, but also to walk the environmental walk". Alyosha was born two weeks after the Chernobyl disaster in 1986, and she considers the disaster being "one of the darkest pages in the history" of Ukraine.

== Eurovision ==
In December 2009, Ukrainian broadcasting company National Television Company of Ukraine (NTU) announced that Vasyl Lazarovych had been selected to represent Ukraine at the Eurovision Song Contest 2010. In March 2010, a new national final was held due to complaints over the broadcaster's internal selection of Lazarovych. The final was held two days before the deadline to enter songs for Eurovision. Alyosha won the final with the song "To Be Free", but one day before the deadline, it was discovered that the song had been available for purchase since 2008. Eventually, "Sweet People" was chosen as the Ukrainian entry.

At Eurovision Song Contest 2010, Alyosha performed "Sweet People" during the second semi-final on 27 May 2010 in Telenor Arena in Oslo, Norway. The ten best-placed countries qualified for the final and Alyosha received 77 points overall and finished in seventh place, thus qualifying for the final. In the final, she performed seventeenth of the twenty-five participants. She finished in tenth place with 108 points. She did not receive twelve points from any country, but received ten points from Azerbaijan and Belarus.

During the Eurovision performances, Alyosha was alone on stage. At the beginning, she wore a black leather coat hood. A wind machine was used and she had no backing vocals. Alyosha talked about her performance, stating: "My song is very self-sufficient, it doesn't need any dancers or special effects or backing vocalists."

== Chart performance ==
On the week ending 13 June 2010 "Sweet People" debuted at number 73 on the Swiss Singles Chart and stayed there for one week before dropping out of the chart.

== Music video ==
The music video was shot in the abandoned city of Pripyat, Ukraine from 19 to 21 April 2010. The director, Victor Skuratovsky, said that there would be no special effects and no artificial set in the video, "everything will be shot in the abandoned city of Pripyat". During the Eurovision press conference, Alyosha stated:

"It was emotionally hard to stay in this dead city, but it was not dangerous to be there for a day. We just had to shoot one part of the clip in Kyiv, as it features a small child and we did not take her to Chernobyl. But everything in the video is real, nothing was shot in an artificial set."

Parts of the video was shot in an abandoned high school, and she thought "It look[ed] as if the kids left their classes in a hurry and turning over their desks ran outside." The music video premiered on 10 May 2010 at the Eurovision website.

== Charts ==
Chart (2010)	Peak position
Switzerland (Schweizer Hitparade)	73
