= Zosia Karbowiak =

Polish singer-songwriter

ZoSia Karbowiak
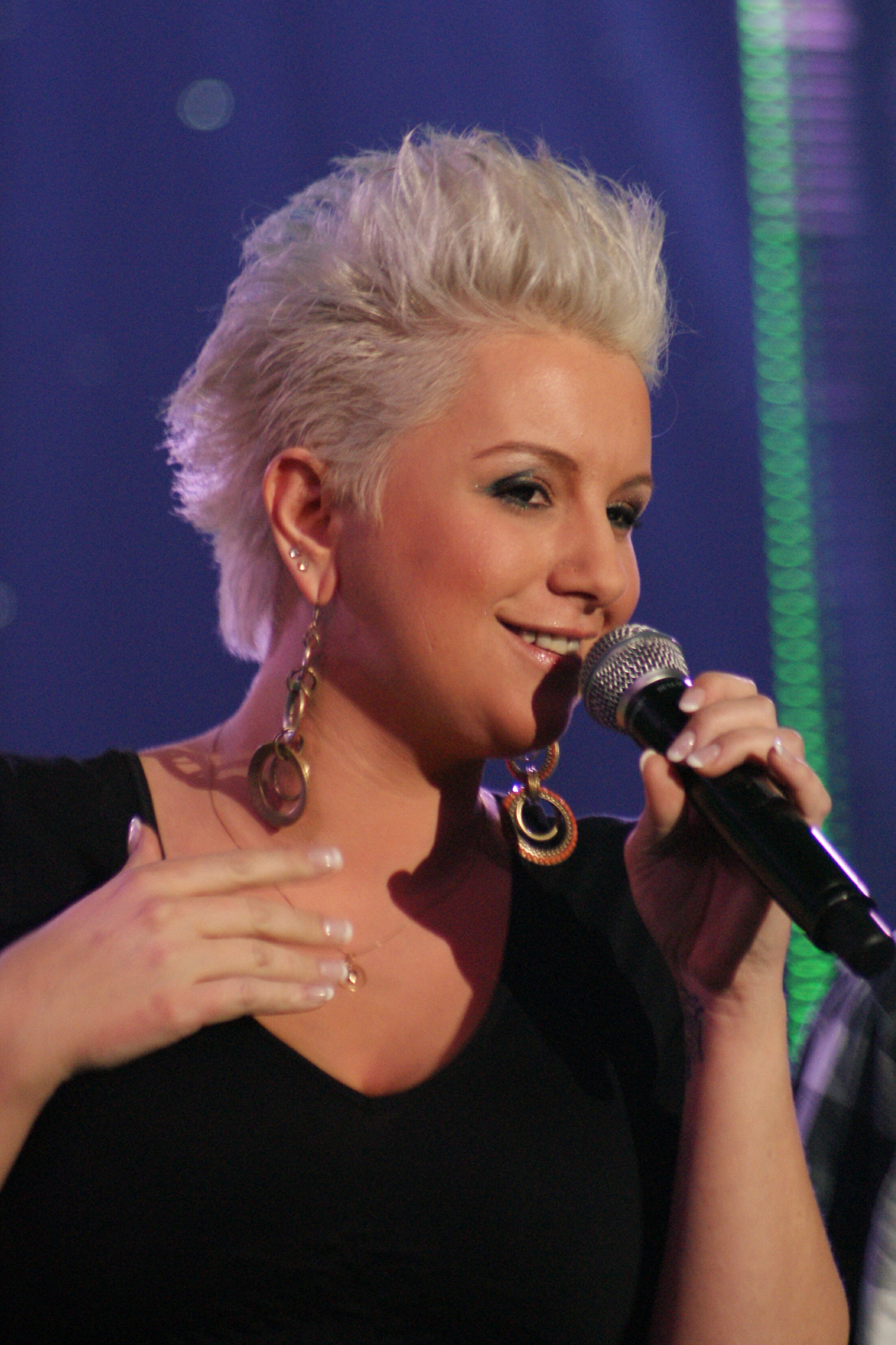
- Karbowiak at concert on 14 February 2010

Background information
- Also known as: ZoSia
- Born: Zosia Zalewska; 15 October 1980 (age 45); Poland
- Occupation: Singer-songwriter
- Years active: 1994–present
- Website: zosiakarbowiak.com

Zosia Karbowiak (born 15 October 1980), known professionally as ZoSia (stylized with uppercase "S"), is a Polish singer-songwriter. She has appeared on TV in Poland and in Denmark including performances at the National Polish Song Festival in 2009, and the national eliminations for the 2010 and the 2011 Eurovision Song Contests. Between 2004 and 2008 she played over 300 concerts. Her first album in Europe was released in 2007 Her first Global Release was in 2009, S.I.N.G.

== Career highlights ==
ZoSia Karbowiak was born Zosia Zalewska in Poland. Although she never had formal musical training, she showed an aptitude at a young age and began singing, playing piano and learning percussion. During her early years she became immersed in classical music. In high school, with the absence of any formal lessons being available to her, she began to develop her skills composing music and lyrics as a young teenager on her own. She then began to perform bossa nova and jazz for live audiences.

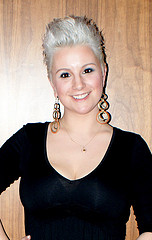
ZoSia at Eurovision

When ZoSia was sixteen her interest in the piano re-surfaced and she was now concentrating on more pop and rock music. At nineteen she joined a new band where she met her future husband, drummer, Tomek Karbowiak. As well as performing, they began collaborating on new songs and material. After their marriage, three children, a move to Denmark that would last 5 years, playing countless shows, they returned to Poland but continued to commute to Denmark on a regular basis to perform.

ZoSia's talent during this time expanded internationally when her music was discovered by Jason Scheff, lead tenor and bass player for the Rock Band Chicago. During their tour of Europe in 2008, Scheff along with Robert Lamm founding member of Chicago, met with ZoSia and Tomek and agreed to be the Executive Producers of her Solo CD S.I.N.G.

ZoSia appeared on TV in Poland and Denmark including a performance at the Polish National Song Festival in 2009; national eliminations for Eurovision 2010 and Eurovision 2011. also in 2010–2011 ZoSia collaborated with Robert Lamm on his Solo CD "Living Proof" where she co-wrote and sang three songs: "Liquid Sky", "Those Crazy Things" and "Arise". All three of these songs rose to the top of the Chart on the public Polish Radio

She has been on the cover and interviewed by "Trendy Magazine" In January 2015, and along with Tomek, they took on a Project called 105 Drum Corps at the Cultural Center in Koszalin to teach students the basics of marching band drumming. These teens were featured in "Prestiz Magazine" in June 2014. Later in 2015, ZoSia celebrated her 20 years of music at a Jubilee in Poland. In early 2016, ZoSia was asked to sing at the yearly tourist event in Mielno followed by a performance in Koszalin with the Philharmony Orchestra This concert included a group of students she coached vocally called V-Pack and also the 105 Drum Corp.

Karbowiak was part of the Contante & Sonante Release "Tomi Malm – Walkin' On Air" (2017) on 3 tracks as a background vocalist: the title track featured Jason Scheff on lead vocals with Eric Marienthal on saxophone and Vinnie Colaiuta on drums; "Favor" with Frank Adahl's vocals that included drummer Simon Phillips; and "Perfect Inperfection" featured Jeff Pescetto on vocals and John JR Robinson on drums. She performed a virtual duet and background vocals with the late Warren Wiebe for "Show Me A Sign" with Eric Marienthal on the saxophone.

Zosia was also part of the Contante & Sonante Release "Tomi Malm - Coming Home" (2020) featured on tracks as a writer, player and vocalist.

== Discography ==
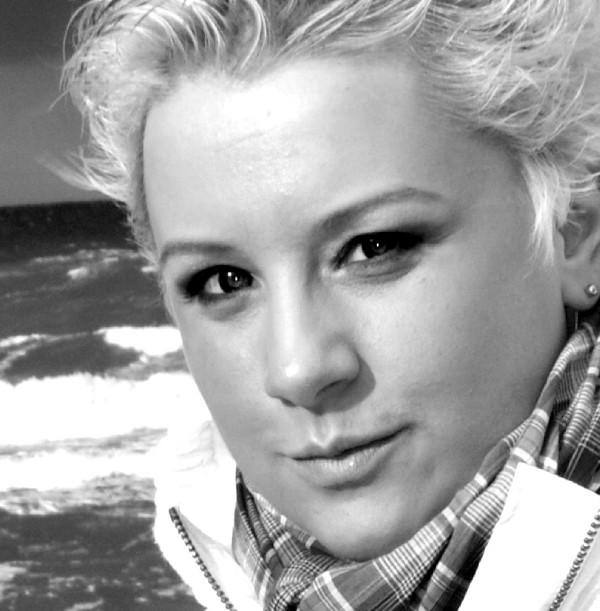
ZoSia at Unieście Beach

- Songs from S.I.N.G.
  - Sunny Day (Karbowiak)
  - Love Your Mistakes (Karbowiak/Bennett)
  - Moge (Karbowiak)
  - S.I.N.G. (Karbowiak)
  - When (Karbowiak/Bennett)
  - Full of Pride (Karbowiak)
  - Live your Life (Karbowiak)
  - Living On Earth (Karbowiak)
  - Written in My Heart (Karbowiak)
  - It's OK (Karbowiak/Bennett)
- Songs from Living Proof Robert Lamm's Solo CD
  - Arise (Lamm/Karbowiak)
  - Those Crazy Things (Lamm/Karbowiak)
  - Liquid Sky (Karbowiak/Lamm)
- Single Releases
  - ŚNIEGU PO PACHY (Chest High Snow) (Karbowiak)
  - TEN (Karbowiak)
- Walkin' On Air (Contante & Sonante 2017)
  - "Show Me A Sign" (Hank Easton) duet with Warren Wiebe; also included on track were Tomi Malm on keyboards and players Lars-Erik Dahle, Lars Daugaard, Bernt Rune Stray, Eric Marienthal
  - "Favor" (Adahl/Malm) featured Frank Adahl on lead vocals, Malm on keyboards and Karbowiak contributed background vocals with Adahl & Malm. Other players included Alex Al, Simon Phillips, Porty Malm, Jonas Lindeborg, Patrik Eriksson, Andreas Anderson, Jonas Wall & Magnus Wiklund
  - "Walkin' On Air" (Kavan/Malm) featured Jason Scheff lead vocals and Karbowiak, Scheff, Langhoff & Malm on background vocals with players Vinnie Colaiuta, Dan Warner, Erik Marienthal, Patrik Eriksson & Mattias Lejdal
  - "Perfect Imperfection" with singer Jeff Pescetto & Tomi Malm on keyboards, Karbowiak, Percetto & Malm on background vocals. Players included were Robbie Buchanan, Neil Stubenhaus, John JR Robinson, Bernt Rune Stray, Brandon Fields & Patrik Eriksson.
- Coming Home (Contante & Sonante 2020)
  - "Na WeWe (With You)" - Lead and background vocals written with Tomi Malm
  - "Coming Home" (title track) & "Leave It To The Girls" - background vocals
