= Eva Rivas =

Eva Rivas Եվա Ռիվաս
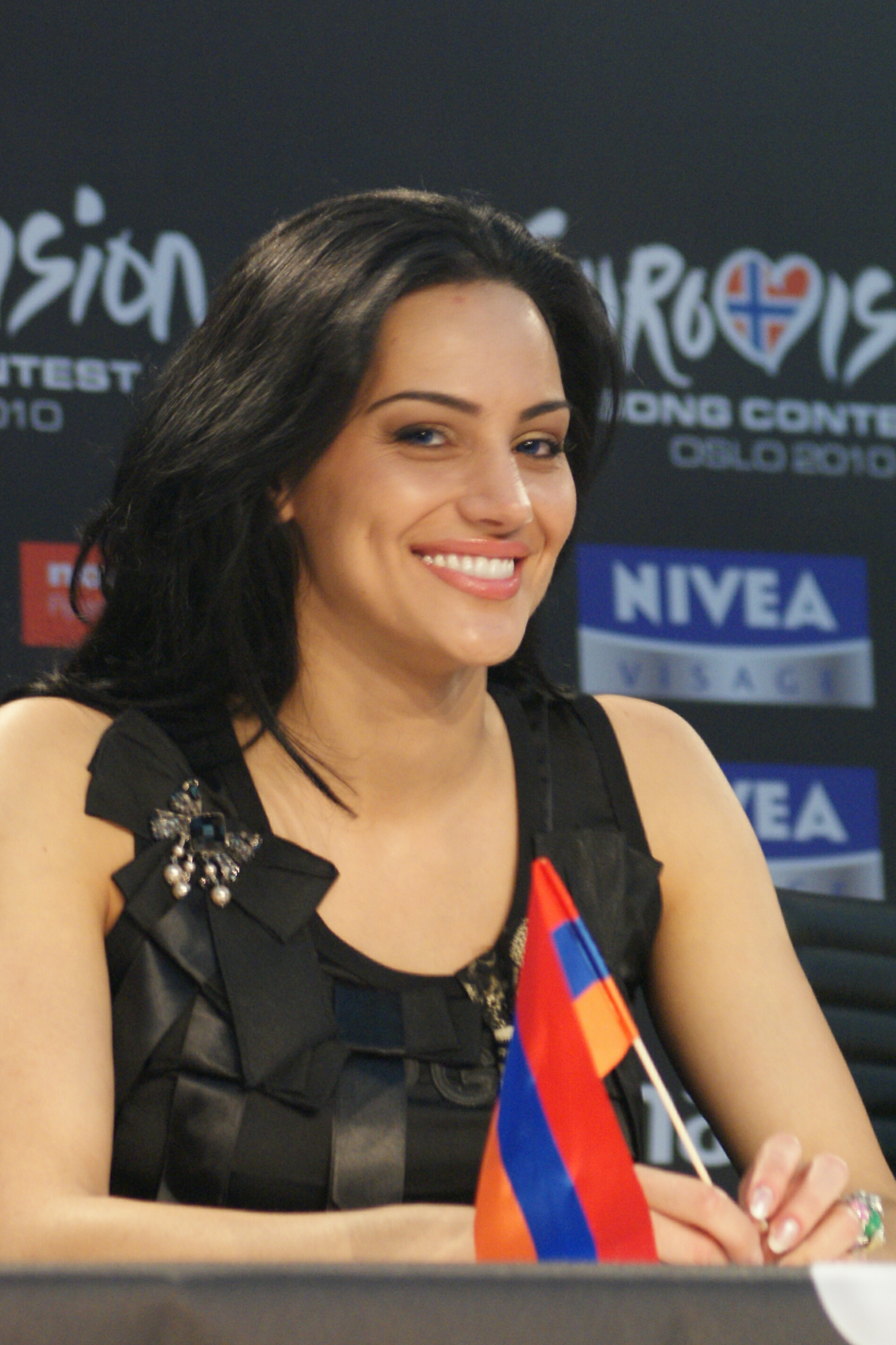
- Eva Rivas in Oslo, May 2010

Background information
- Born: Valeria Alexandrovna Reshetnikova-Tsatouryan; 13 July 1987 (age 39); Rostov-on-Don, Russian SFSR, USSR
- Genres: Pop
- Occupation: Singer
- Years active: 1994–present

Valeria Alexandrovna Reshetnikova-Tsatouryan (Armenian: Վալերիա Ռուստետնիկովա-Ծատուրյան, Russian: Валерия Александровна Решетникова-Цатурян; born 13 July 1987), better known by her stage name Eva Rivas, is a Russian-Armenian singer. She represented Armenia in the Eurovision Song Contest 2010 with the song "Apricot Stone". In 2014, Rivas was a judge on the third season of The Voice of Armenia.

== Early life ==
Rivas was born and raised in Rostov-on-Don to an Armenian mother and a father of Russian and Greek descent. She took the stage name Eva Rivas from her Greek great-grandmother. Growing up in Rostov, she sang in the Armenian "Arevik" ensemble.

== Career ==
=== Eurovision Song Contest ===
On 14 February 2010, Rivas won the Armenian National Final and went on to represent Armenia in the Eurovision Song Contest 2010 with the song "Apricot Stone." She was placed sixth in the semi-final and advanced to the final where she performed 21st in the line-up and placed seventh with a total of 141 points.

To promote her song that year, Rivas visited, prior to the contest, some European countries. She had wished to represent Armenia again in the Eurovision Song Contest 2012; however, ultimately Armenia did not participate that year.

== Discography ==
=== Singles ===
Title	Year	Peak chart positions
Title	Year	SWI
"Apricot Stone"	2010	54

Awards and achievements
Preceded by Inga and Anush Arshakyan with "Jan Jan"	Armenia in the Eurovision Song Contest; 2010	Succeeded by Emmy with "Boom Boom"
