= Jason Gleed =

Canadian musician and songwriter

- Born: Toronto
- Occupations: Musician, Songwriter
- Known for: Writing music for ad campaigns

Jason Gleed is a Canadian musician, songwriter, and producer.

Originally from Toronto, Gleed graduated as an Ontario Scholar from Crescent School, studied briefly at McMaster University, but left to attend York Mills Collegiate Institute before later enrolling at the University of Toronto's science program where he was accepted into Trinity College. He left the program in 1999 to work at the newly formed Grayson Matthews Audio.

He has written music and performed vocals for national ad campaigns for Alltel, McDonald's, Coke, Pepsi, ATT, Allel, KFC, Lexus, Chevy, Ford, Toyota, Sears, Daisy Sour Cream, and Hellmann's.

He has songs featured in many major motion pictures such as Jumper, Speed Racer, American Pie Beta House, What Happens in Vegas, Hotel For Dogs, Hamlet 2, Beverly Hills Chihuahua, Hannah Montana, Sex Drive, Spring Breakdown, Cats and Dogs 2, Star Struck, Big Mommas House 3, Hop, Footloose, The Muppets, and The Adjustment Bureau.

Gleed spent several years touring with multi-Juno award-winning Canadian House DJ/producer Hatiras as vocalist/performer, Jaxon. Together Hatiras and Jaxon were known as the Electro House duo, Hatjak. They released one full-length album.

Gleed is sponsored by Sony, and occasionally tours with Sony Creative Software.

== Filmography ==
=== Film ===
- American Pie Presents: Beta House (2007)
- Jumper (2008)
- What Happens in Vegas (2008)
- Speed Racer (2008)
- Sex and the City (2008)
- Hamlet 2 (2008)
- Beverly Hills Chihuahua (2008)
- Sex Drive (2008)
- Hotel For Dogs (2009)
- Hannah Montana: The Movie (2009)
- Spring Breakdown (2009)
- Night at the Museum: Battle of the Smithsonian
- Starstruck (2010)
- Big Mommas: Like Father, Like Son (2011)
- The Adjustment Bureau (2011)
- Hop (2011)
- Footloose (2011)
- The Muppets (2011)
- The Loud House Movie (2021)

=== Television ===
- Theme for 2008 Disney Channel Games
- Theme for My Dad the Rock Star
- Theme for Spider Riders
- Theme for Braceface
- Theme for Disney "So Random"
- Theme for Disney "Kickin' It

== Artist work ==
- Gleedsville
- Miley Cyrus as Hannah Montana co-producer of song "Let's Do This"
- The Clique Girlz co-writer and co-producer for The Clique movie soundtrack
- Mitchel Musso co-writer and co-producer of song "Didn't Have To Walk Away"
- Kelly Clarkson co-producer "Go"
- Queensberry co-producer "The Song"
- Anna Cyzon writer/co-producer "Love Me", "Young Boy", "Reputation"
