= Vasyl Lazarovych =

Ukrainian singer and performer

- Василь Лазарович
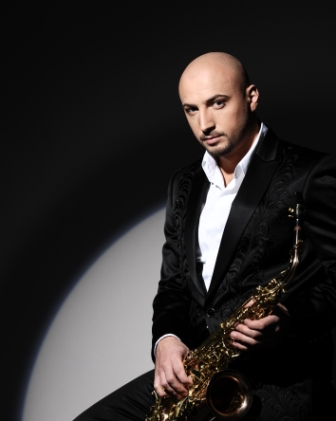
- Born: Василь Васильців
- Occupation: Singer
- Musical career
- Instrument: Vocals

Vasyl Lazarovych (Ukrainian: Василь Лазарович) is a Ukrainian singer and performer.

== Biography ==
2002 – graduated as a vocalist from the Stefanyk Ivano-Frankivsk University. He also played the part of Alexander II in the musical "Equator".

2004 – acted as a soloist in the Belarus Orchestra under the direction of Mikhail Finberg, performed at the "Slavonic Bazaar" Song Contest.

2005 – Student of the Tchaikovsky Music Academy

== Eurovision Song Contest 2010 ==
On 29 December 2009 he was selected internally by the Ukrainian representative (NTU) to the Eurovision Song Contest 2010 in Bærum in May. On 6 March 2010 was the song "I Love You" chosen by the public as his song. But on 15 March 2010 National Television Company of Ukraine, which appointed Vasyl to represent Ukraine, decided not to send him to Bærum, because the song was not good enough.

On 17 March 2010 it was announced that he would be replaced by a new, last minute, national selection. However, he participated in the new national final, where he only placed seventh.
