= A luta é alegria =

2011 single by Homens da Luta

Single by Homens da Luta
- Language: Portuguese
- English title: "The struggle is joy"
- Genre: Folk, protest song
- Length: 2:54
- Label: Sony Music Entertainment
- Composer(s): Vasco Duarte
- Lyricist(s): Jel

Homens da Luta singles chronology
"Luta assim não dá" (2010)	"A luta é alegria" (2011)

Alternative cover
- Original cover

Music video
- "A luta é alegria" on YouTube

Eurovision Song Contest 2011 entry
- Country: Portugal

Finals performance
- Semi-final result: 18th
- Semi-final points: 22
- Final result: {{{place}}}

Entry chronology
- ◄ "Há dias assim" (2021)
- "Vida minha" (2012) ►

Official performance video
- "A luta é alegria (First Semi-Final) on YouTube

"A luta é alegria" (Portuguese pronunciation: [ɐ ˈlutɐ ɛ ɐlɨˈɣɾiɐ]; English: The struggle is joy) was a 2011 protest song released by Homens da Luta, a Portuguese comedy musical street performance group. The song represented Portugal in the Eurovision Song Contest 2011 after winning Festival da Canção 2011, Portugal's national final for the Eurovision Song Contest 2011. The song would fail to qualify, finishing 18th in the first semi-final with 22 points.

== Background ==
According to the band, the song was inspired by the peaceful Carnation Revolution in 1974 which overthrew the authoritarian Estado Novo regime. In a press conference, the band wanted "A luta é alegria" to be like the Carnation Revolution, saying "It was a peaceful revolution. And that’s the spirit we want to bring here to the Eurovision Song Contest." The band also called for unity with music, saying "Music is the weapon of the future! We are facing many problems in Portugal at the moment. People everywhere are reading the newspapers and watching TV, all they read and see are bad news! We feel responsible to make people feel happy! There are people here from 43 nations in harmonious unity. Maybe the European politicians should learn from [them]!"

== Eurovision Song Contest ==
=== Festival da Canção 2011 ===
Festival da Canção 2011 was the 47th edition of Festival da Canção that selected Portugal's entry for the Eurovision Song Contest 2011. Twelve entries competed in the competition which took place on 5 March 2011 at the Teatro Camões in Lisbon.

Artists and composers were able to submit their entries for the competition between 19 November 2010 and 16 January 2011. Composers of any nationality were allowed to submit entries, however artists were required to possess Portuguese citizenship and songs were required to be submitted in the Portuguese language. A jury panel selected twenty-four entries for an online vote from 407 submissions received, which were revealed on 19 January 2011.

The final took place on 5 March 2011. "A luta é alegria", which performed 10th out of 12 entries of the night, would manage to earn 6 points from the jury and the maximum 12 points from the televote, earning a total of 18 points to win Festival da Canção 2011. The outcome would earn controversy, as most of the audience booed or had left after it was announced that Homens da Luta had won.

=== At Eurovision ===
According to Eurovision rules, all nations with the exceptions of the host country and the "Big Five" (France, Germany, Italy, Spain and the United Kingdom) are required to qualify from one of two semi-finals in order to compete for the final; the top ten countries from each semi-final progress to the final. The European Broadcasting Union (EBU) split up the competing countries into six different pots based on voting patterns from previous contests, with countries with favourable voting histories put into the same pot. On 17 January 2011, a special allocation draw was held which placed each country into one of the two semi-finals, as well as which half of the show they would perform in. Portugal was placed into the first semi-final, to be held on 10 May 2011, and was scheduled to perform in the second half of the show. The running order for the semi-finals was decided through another draw on 15 March 2011 and Portugal was set to perform in position 16, following the entry from Hungary and before the entry from Lithuania.

The rehearsals and live performances featured six people, dressed to show different livelihoods protesting together. They included a construction worker that is used to represent an African migrant worker, a college student, an artist and songwriter that is used to represent José Afonso, a military soldier, a farmer representing Portugal's agricultural community, and a revolutionary leader with a megaphone. Five, with the exception of the revolutionary leader, would all carry signs, with the signs reading "The Struggle Is Joy" is multiple languages. The LED screen would also show green and red flowers, the flowers that were given out during the Carnation Revolution.

== Charts ==
Chart	Peak position
Albania (Tekste Shqip)	13
Portugal (Nielsen)	4
