= Filipa Azevedo =

Portuguese singer

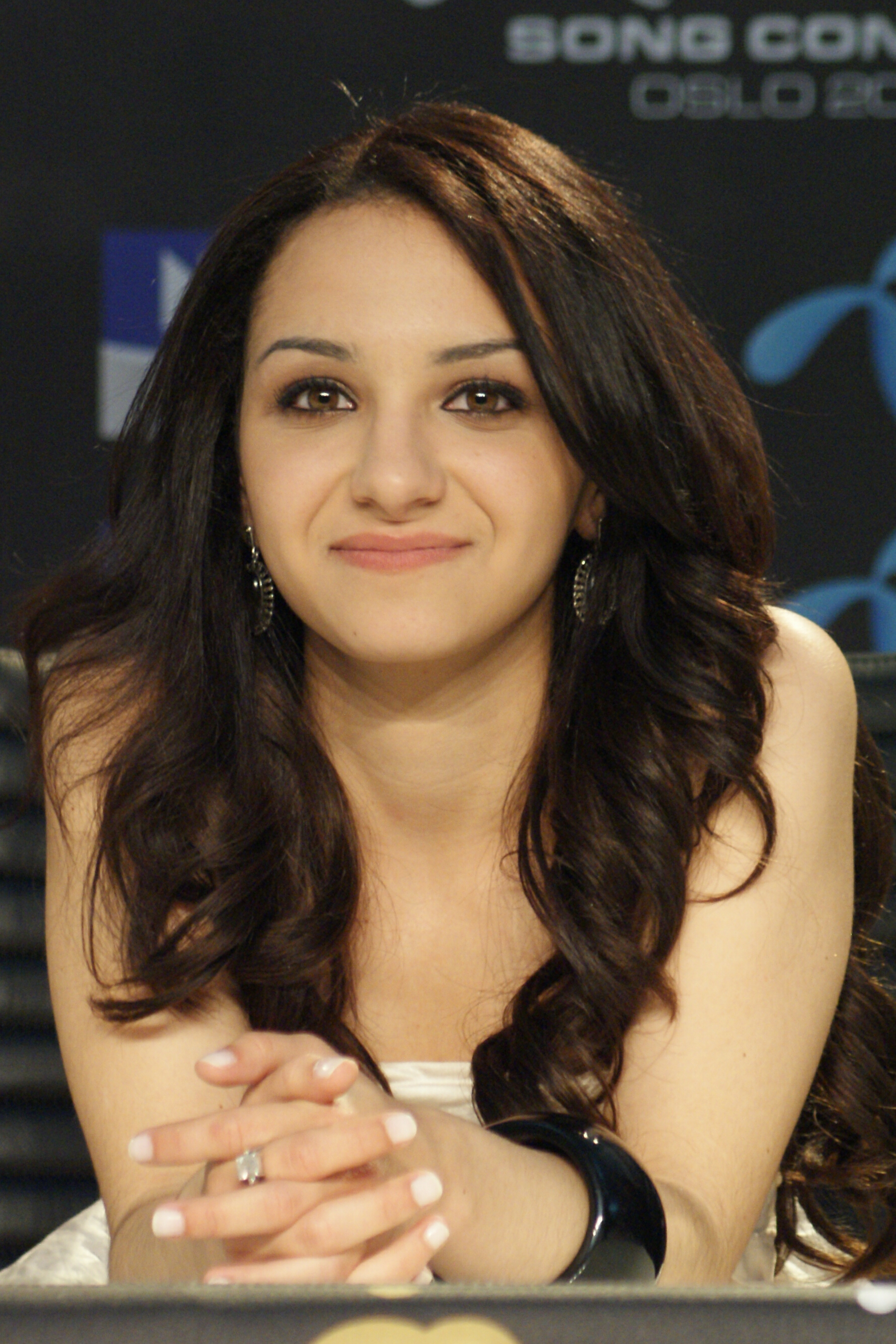
- Filipa Azevedo in Oslo (2010)

Background information
- Born: Filipa Daniela Azevedo de Magalhães; 31 July 1991 (age 34)
- Origin: Massarelos, Porto, Portugal
- Genres: Pop, Latin pop, Rock, Soul, R&B, Hip hop
- Occupation: Singer
- Years active: 2007–present
- Label: Cherry Entertainment
- Website: filipa-azevedo.skyrock.com

Filipa Daniela Azevedo de Magalhães (Portuguese pronunciation: [fiˈlipazɨˈveðu]; born 31 July 1991) is a Portuguese singer. She is currently resident in the United Kingdom while attending music school in London.

Azevedo represented Portugal in the Eurovision Song Contest 2010 with the song "Há dias assim", finishing 18th out of 25 in the final held in Oslo on 29 May 2010 in Oslo, Norway.

== Early life ==
Azevedo was born in Porto and spent the first fifteen years of her life living in the village of Montezelo, close to Melres, a parish of Gondomar, in the northern Portuguese district of Porto. She enrolled at age 12 on a course in Western Concert Flute at the Porto Music Conservatory, discovering there a passion and talent for singing. She soon quit her instrument classes to pursue a musical career, signing up at age 16 for Família Superstar (the Portuguese version of The Superstar Family Show).

== Career ==
=== 2007: Família Superstar ===
The show's judges greeted Azevedo's performance with praise: Anjos singer Sérgio Rosado told her "Honestly, I haven't heard a voice like yours for a long long time ago… Congratulations!...I really had to close my eyes at one point because I felt that I was actually listening to Beyoncé… Congratulations!" His partner in Anjos, singer Nélson Rosado, said "Well, when I started to hear you singing, I almost couldn't believe in what I was hearing… It would be a crime not to have you in this show." Journalist Clara de Sousa told Azevedo "You are like a dam that really needs to open up its floodgates… that voice… you can really deliver a knockout performance…" Azevedo's performance was widely viewed on YouTube, and she went on to receive praise for performances in subsequent shows. Over successive episodes she performed Beyoncé's "Listen", "A Moment Like This" by Kelly Clarkson and as arranged by Leona Lewis, Evanescence's "My Immortal", Shirley Bassey's "Goldfinger", Tina Turner's "GoldenEye", Madonna's "Like a Prayer", Whitney Houston's "When You Believe", Simon and Garfunkel's "Bridge Over Troubled Water" (also as arranged by Leona Lewis), and Mariah Carey's "Endless Love".

In the final of the show, Clara de Sousa described Azevedo as "worth 3 or 4 singers." Sérgio Rosado called her "absolutely perfect", and his brother Nélson said she was a "raw talent (…) a very good singer (…) a brilliant performer." Tózé Brito, a music mogul and the chief judge of the show, said Azevedo was "like an angel singing. Tonight you were also an earthquake. You were incredible… I already knew your amazing low notes, but tonight you hit such high notes that very few professional singers in Portugal would be able to do as you did." Sérgio Rosado concluded that she was "undoubtedly, the best singer in the show. She was the voice of this show. If the Portuguese, at home, vote well, they will vote for Azevedo", and offered to produce her first album. On the night of 31 December Azevedo was elected the winner of the show.

=== 2008: stardom and move to London ===
Over the coming year Azevedo made media appearances, performed live on several TV shows, and began recording her first album. She also recorded a duet with her Familia Superstar co-contestant Catarina Pereira; the song, Carrossel de Papel (Paper Carousel), was included on the charity CD O melhor do mundo (The best of the world), all proceeds of which were donated to children's charities.

Azevedo moved in the same year to live with relatives in London, where she enrolled to study vocal technique and music technology and production.

=== 2009: Filipa Azevedo ===
In 2009 her album Filipa Azevedo premiered. The quality of the production was criticized, though Azevedo's vocals nonetheless received praise. On advice she left her original record label and signed to Cherry Entertainment, a record that represents other Portuguese artists including Mia Rose. TV and live performances around the country followed.

=== 2010–present: Festival da Canção and Eurovision Song Contest ===
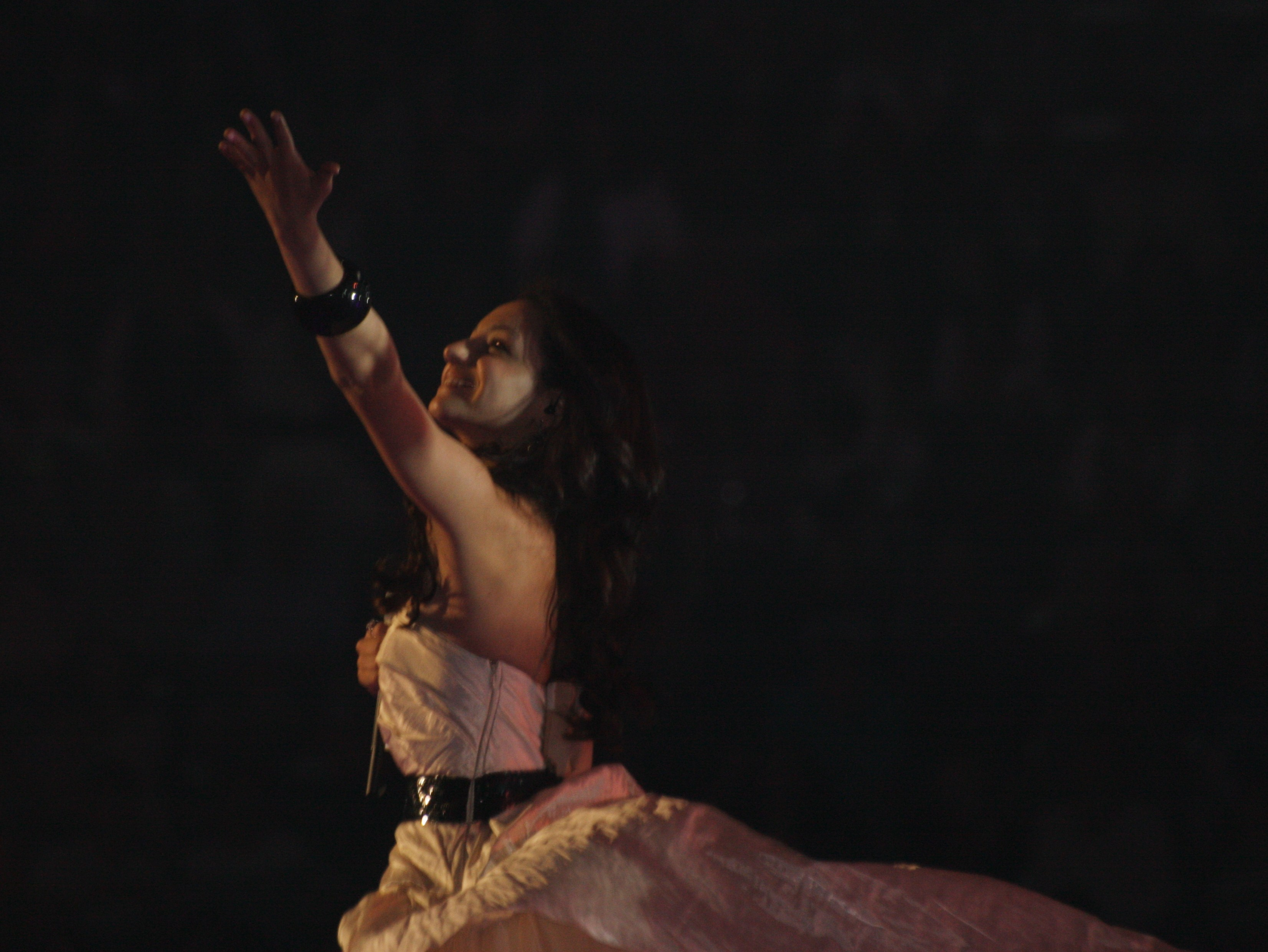
Azevedo on the stage of Eurovision Song Contest 2010

In early 2010 Azevedo was invited by SIC, a Portuguese TV channel, to be the main singer on a memorial record for the victims of the earthquake in Haiti, performing renditions of We are the world (Band Aid), The Earth Song (Michael Jackson), and Imagine (John Lennon).

She had already been asked by Augusto Madureira to sing his song at this year's Festival da Canção, ahead of a prospective bid to represent Portugal at Eurovision. The song was selected among the 30 acts for the quarter-finals, progressing with 23 other acts to the semi-finals. Azevedo performed as the fourth act of the first semi-final. She won the televote, earning a place in the final qualifier.

In the final Azevedo faced a number of other prominent singers, including Catarina Pereira, Vanessa and Nuno Pinto. This time, she performed ninth and, despite placing only fourth in the popular vote, won the jury vote with 19 points and thereby won the competition. She performed the ballad Há dias assim (the English version of which was entitled "It's one of those days") at Eurovision 2010 in Oslo.

In 2015, she appeared on The Voice Portugal.

== Discography ==
=== Albums ===
- Filipa Azevedo – 2009

=== Singles ===
- "Só eu sei" – 2008
- "Tu és magia, tu és a paz" (duet with Susana Azevedo) – 2009
- "Há dias assim" – 2010
- "Num Instante (Somos Uma Voz)" (duet with Nelson Antunes) – 2010

=== Compilations ===
- "Familia Superstar" – 2007
- "Carrossel de Papel" – 2008
- "Festival da Canção" – 2010

Preceded by Flor-de-Lis with Todas as Ruas do Amor	Portugal in the Eurovision Song Contest; 2010	Succeeded by Homens da Luta with A luta é alegria
