= Zheng Zhou =

Chinese-born baritone (born c. 1957)

- Born: c.1957 (age 68–69); China
- Occupations: opera singer (baritone); professor of singing

Zheng Zhou (born c. 1957) is a Chinese-born baritone whose singing career included performances in major opera houses and concert halls in North America and Europe. He also appears on the premiere recordings of Philip Glass's the CIVIL warS and La Belle et la Bête on Nonesuch Records and Jason K. Hwang's chamber opera The Floating Box on New World Records. After retiring from the stage, he became Professor of Singing at the Shanghai Conservatory of Music.

== Life and career ==
Zhou was born in China. He began studying piano in Shanghai when he was five but had to stop six years later when the Cultural Revolution banned pianos. He was able to resume the piano when he was seventeen, but found it difficult to regain the skills he once had. His mother had been a concert singer and a family friend who was a voice teacher encouraged him to study singing instead. After graduating from the Shanghai Conservatory of Music, he did his military service in the Chinese Army's singing ensemble. On his singing teacher's suggestion he decided to pursue his vocal studies in the United States. From 1985 to 1987 he studied with Edward Zambara at the St. Louis Conservatory of Music and from 1987 to 1990 with Mark Elyn at the University of Illinois where he received his Master of Music degree in voice. In 1990 he won the Rose Shenson Scholarship to San Francisco Opera's Merola Opera Program and the University of Illinois Krannert Debut Award. The following year he won the first-prize in Mae M. Whitaker International Competition for Voice.

While in his first year of the Merola Opera Program, Zhou toured the US with Western Opera Theater (the now-defunct touring arm of San Francisco Opera) as Enrico in Lucia di Lammermoor, a role he would reprise at Vancouver Opera in 2000. In 1992, he again toured with Western Opera Theater as Giorgio Germont in La traviata. Later that year he appeared on SFO's main stage in two small roles: the Surgeon in Verdi's La forza del destino and the Messenger in Milhaud's Christophe Colomb. Zhou made his debut at the Metropolitan Opera on 5 October 1993 as Yamadori in Madama Butterfly. He returned in the 1995–96 season as Ping in Turandot and again as Yamadori in Madama Butterfly.

During the 1990s Zhou also began his association with the works of Philip Glass. He sang Ludovic in the American premiere of La Belle et la Bête in 1994 and also appears on the premiere recording of the work. In 1995 he sang the role of Abraham Lincoln in the revival of the CIVIL warS (Rome section) at Carnegie Hall, and again appears on the premiere recording. In 1998 he sang two small roles (Sailor and Traveler) in the world premiere of Glass's White Raven at the Teatro Camões in Lisbon and in its Spanish premiere at the Teatro Real later that year. Zhou created two roles in operas by composers of Chinese descent in 2001—Manli in Cha Ka Nin's Iron Road and Father's Ghost in Jason Kao Hwang's The Floating Box.

Since retiring from the stage, Zhou has been Professor of Singing at the Shanghai Conservatory of Music.
