= White Raven (opera) =

1998 opera by Philip Glass

- Opera by Philip Glass
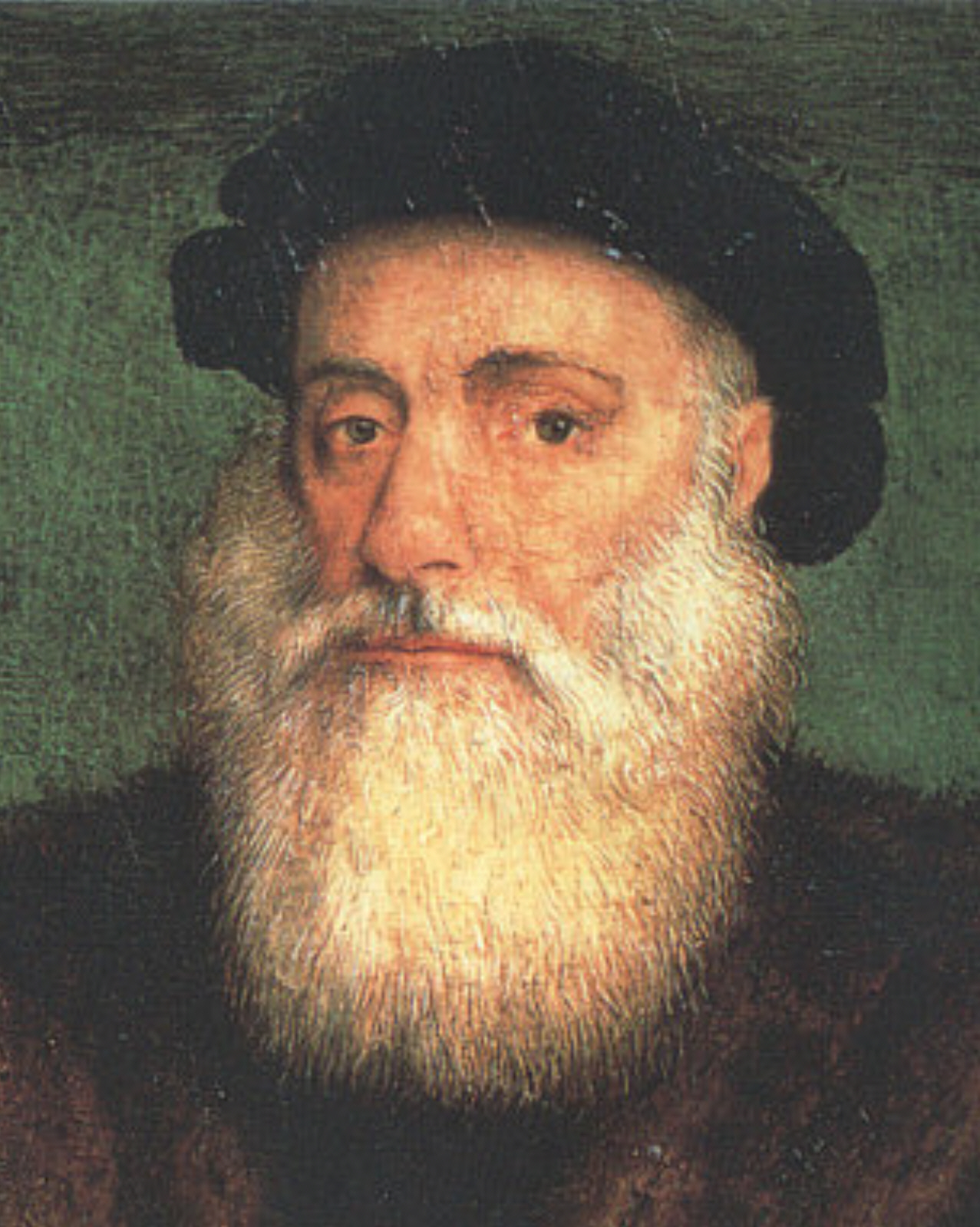
- Vasco da Gama
- Librettist: Luísa Costa Gomes
- Premiere: 26 September 1998; Teatro Camões, Lisbon

White Raven is an opera in five acts and three knee plays (Glass's term for interludes), for soloists, choir and orchestra, composed in 1991 by Philip Glass in collaboration with Robert Wilson, with libretto by Luísa Costa Gomes. Commissioned by the National Commission for the Commemoration of the Portuguese Discoveries in the Teatro Real in Madrid, the world premiere of the work (in Portuguese under the name O Corvo Branco) took place on the occasion of the International Exhibition, 26 September 1998 in the Teatro Camões in Lisbon, directed by Dennis Russell Davies. The Spanish premiere, under the direction of Günter Neuhold, took place on the 28 November 1998 (a live television broadcast was subsequently broadcast on the channel TVE) and the American premiere at Lincoln Center, in New York, directed by Dennis Russell Davies and with choreography by Lucinda Childs, 10 July 2001.

== Conception ==
When contacted in the early 1990s by António Mega Ferreira, member of the Portuguese Commission and future Expo '98 Commissioner, Glass, who had just written The Voyage to celebrate the 500th anniversary of the arrival of Christopher Columbus in America, initially shows no enthusiasm for the idea of redoing an opera on the theme of discovery. Invited to think about it again, he accepts on condition that Robert Wilson be part of the project. He then left for Brazil where he composed music for a whole winter.

Originally, O Corvo Branco was to be part of a diptych of which it would have been the conclusion. The first part, which was never written, was to be called The Palace Of Arabian Nights and focused on the development and expansion of Islam from the 9th century to the Renaissance. O Corvo Branco covers the rest of the story, from the 15th century to the 21st century. The reason this other part of the diptych never was done is believed to be due to a misunderstanding between Glass and Wilson.

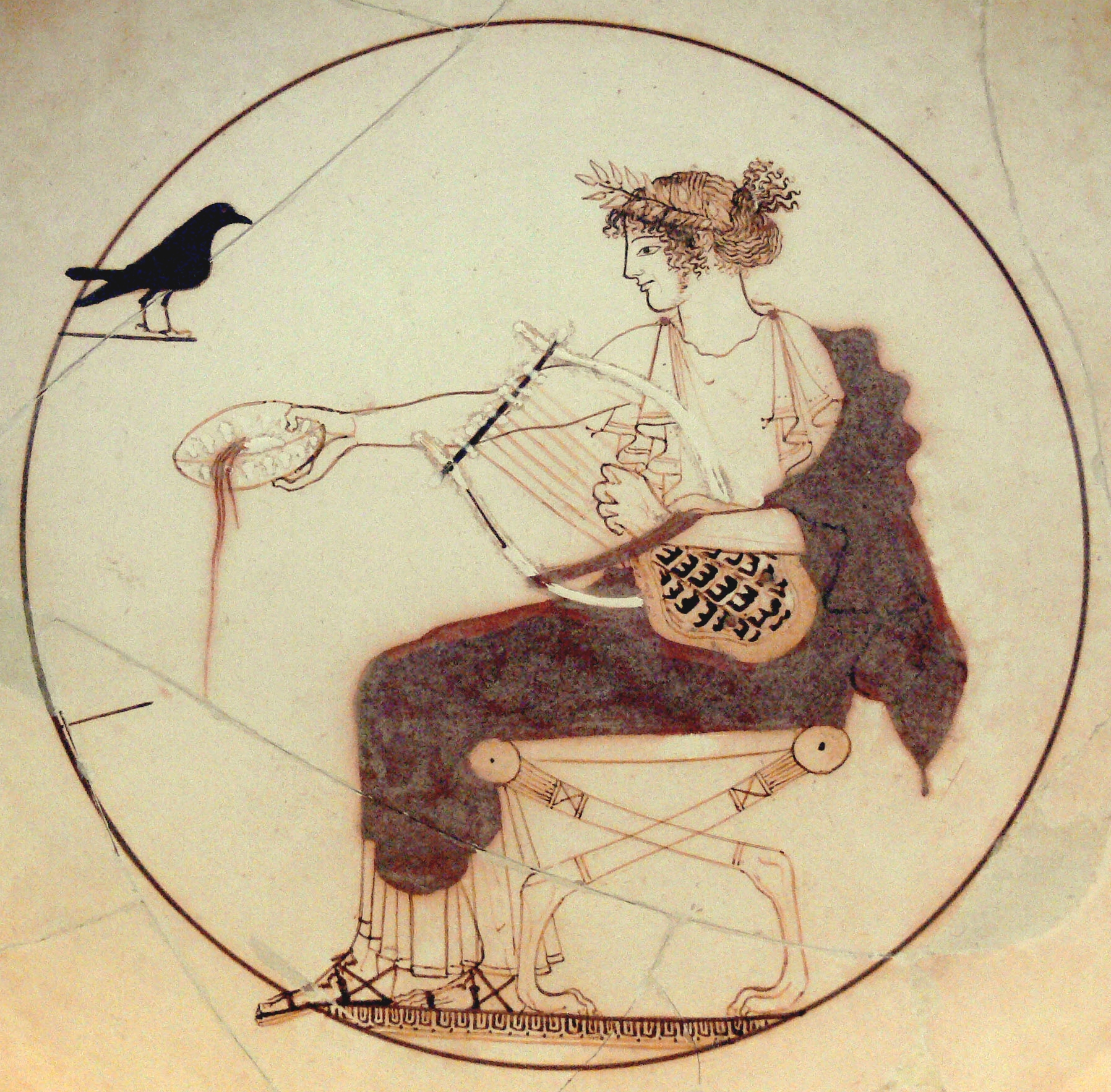
Apollo and the Raven, Delphi Archaeological Museum

The title White Raven is taken from Greek mythology: Apollo, in love with Princess Coronis, daughter of Phlegias, king of the Lapiths, entrusted a white crow, his favorite companion, to watch over her. But as the days went by, the bird, finding its mission more and more boring, decided one night to betray its master's trust. The raven told Apollo that Coronis was cheating on him with a mortal named Ischys. Mad with rage, Apollo killed the young girl with an arrow in the chest before realizing that the crow had lied. To punish him, Apollo transformed with his fiery hand his immaculate plumage into a collection of feathers as black as coal. The white crow is therefore here a messenger and a symbol of lost innocence.

As with the other collaborations between Glass and Wilson (Einstein on the Beach, The CIVIL warS and Monsters of Grace), White Raven doesn't really tell a story. The libretto presents a sort of panorama of characters and events by mixing poetic verses with scientific treatises, newspaper headlines or, as in the finale, a long list of Portuguese historical figures. In this sense, the opera is not so much a celebration of exploration, but a meditation, an open reflection on the process and meaning of the concept of discovery, from the expeditions of the famous Portuguese explorer to the modern era of missions on the Moon, and until the future exploration of the Universe.

Anthony Tommasini wrote in his review for The New York Times:

With his formulaic approach to composing, Mr. Glass has churned out a lot of inconsequential music. With White Raven, at least in places, you sense that he is working harder. It's amazing how by adding just a little complexity here and there to his mind-massaging music -- breaking up foursquare rhythmic repetitions with asymmetrical patterns and nudging syncopations, or surprising us with a jarring bass line that adds a dissonant ripple to the tranquil pool of diatonic harmony – Mr. Glass can suddenly perk up your ears. Still, as the opera goes on (this is a three-hour evening), the score seems increasingly padded.

For his part Mr. Wilson, working with the inventive costume designer Moidele Bickel, has created a beautifully surreal stage show. Da Gama and his fellow explorers wear stiff cream-white sailor costumes, and the queen appears in a gargantuan black-collared dress. The stage is soon populated by a whole roster of weird characters: Africans with garishly painted bodies, one of whom has a huge elephant foot; exotic birds and animals; a sad-faced Dog Man; a spindly dragon; a Miss Universe character in sequined black singing arias on a crescent moon; and a galumphing Tin Man who could have stepped out of a Robert Wilson production of The Wizard of Oz.

The libretto in Portuguese by the writer Luisa Costa Gomes is a cut-and-paste assemblage of philosophical ruminations, historical and epic texts, travel logs, journals and newspaper headlines. In one of the opera's freshest segments, the king and the queen discuss the proper rules of etiquette for entertaining. If only the creators had used humor more often to explore their themes of exploration and discovery. In its fanciful way, this scene has powerful resonance, for after all, touring another country, or even going to your neighbor's house, involves learning to adjust to different, and often rattling, customs and protocols.

== Cast and characters ==
Role	Voice type	Cast, 26 September 1998 Direction: Dennis Russell Davies
Queen, Scientist 1	soprano	Ana Paula Russo
Raven 1	soprano	Suzan Hanson
Raven 2, Scientist 2	mezzo-soprano	Maria Jonas
Da Gama, Traveler 1	bass-baritone	Herbert Perry
King	baritone	Yuri Batukov
Native Queen, Miss Universe, Dragon	mezzo-soprano	Janice Felty
Sailor 1, Scientist 3, Traveler 2	tenor	Douglas Perry
Sailor 3, Traveler 3	baritone	Fabrice Raviola
Sailor 2, Traveler 4	bass-bariton	Zheng Zhou
Judy Garland, Siamese Twin 1	soprano	Paula Pires de Matos
Siamese Twin 2	soprano	Sandra Medeiros
Barcelos Clock, Dogman	mezzo-soprano	Marina Ferreira
Spoonman	tenor	David Lee Brewer
Tin Man, Ocephalus	tenor	John Duykers (replaced by Anthony Roden for the Spanish premiere)
Native King, Elephant Foot	basse	Vincent Dion Stringer
Writer	acteur	Diogo Infante

== Structure ==
- Act 1
  - Knee Play 1, The Writer with two ravens
  - Scene 1, Portuguese court
  - Knee Play 2
  - Scene 2, The journey
  - Scene 3, Africa
  - Scene 4, India
- Act 2
  - Scene 1, Underwater exploration
  - Scene 2, Exploring black holes in the sky
- Act 3
  - Prologue
  - Scene 1, Portuguese court
  - Knee Play 3, The Writer as raven
  - Scene 2, Night visitors
- Act 4
  - Scene 1, Scherzo
  - Knee Play 4, The Writer with a table of water and a flying feather
- Act 5
  - Scene 1, Brazil
  - Epilogue
