= Orlando (Neuwirth opera) =

Opera by Austrian composer Olga Neuwirth

Orlando is an opera by Austrian composer Olga Neuwirth, with a libretto by Neuwirth and American playwright Catherine Filloux, based on the 1928 novel Orlando: A Biography by Virginia Woolf. Subtitled A Fictional Musical Biography in 19 Scenes, the opera was commissioned by the Vienna State Opera and premiered there on 8 December 2019. It received the 2022 Grawemeyer Award for Music Composition.

== Background ==
Neuwirth composed Orlando between 2017 and 2019. The work was the first full-length opera by a woman to be commissioned and premiered by the Vienna State Opera, which had not staged an opera by a female composer in its 150-year history. Neuwirth and Filloux adapted Woolf's novel while extending its chronology into the 20th and 21st centuries. The libretto focuses on gender identity, political upheaval and social change.

=== Synopsis ===
The opera is based on Virginia Woolf's novel Orlando: A Biography. It follows an English aristocrat and poet who lives across several centuries, changing from male to female while ageing at an unusually slow rate. The opera retains the novel's treatment of gender and identity and extends its historical setting to include the Second World War and contemporary political events.

The music combines orchestral and electronic instrumentation, with parts for percussion, electric guitar and synthesizers. The score also incorporates cabaret and rock elements alongside music associated with Tudor music. The production includes spoken narration and video projections.

== Production ==
The world premiere took place at the Vienna State Opera on 8 December 2019, conducted by Matthias Pintscher. Kate Lindsey sang Orlando, Anna Clementi was the narrator, Eric Jurenas played the Guardian Angel, and Justin Vivian Bond appeared as Orlando's child. Polly Graham directed the production, with sets by Roy Spahn, video by Will Duke and costumes designed by Rei Kawakubo for Comme des Garçons.

== Reception ==
Writing in The Guardian, Andrew Clements praised the production's musical range and visual design. The opera was subsequently awarded the 2022 Grawemeyer Award for Music Composition, announced in December 2021.
