= Flor-de-Lis =

Portuguese band

- Origin: Lisbon, Portugal
- Genres: World, Fado, Folk, Acoustic
- Years active: 2004–present
- Members: Daniela Varela - vocals José Camacho - guitars Vasco Corisco - bass Pedro Marques - percussion

Flor de Lis is a Portuguese folk music group which represented Portugal at the Eurovision Song Contest 2009 in Moscow, Russia, following their victory in the 45th edition of Festival da Canção, with the song "Todas as ruas do amor" (English: All the streets of love). It qualified for the final from the first semi final where it finished 15th.

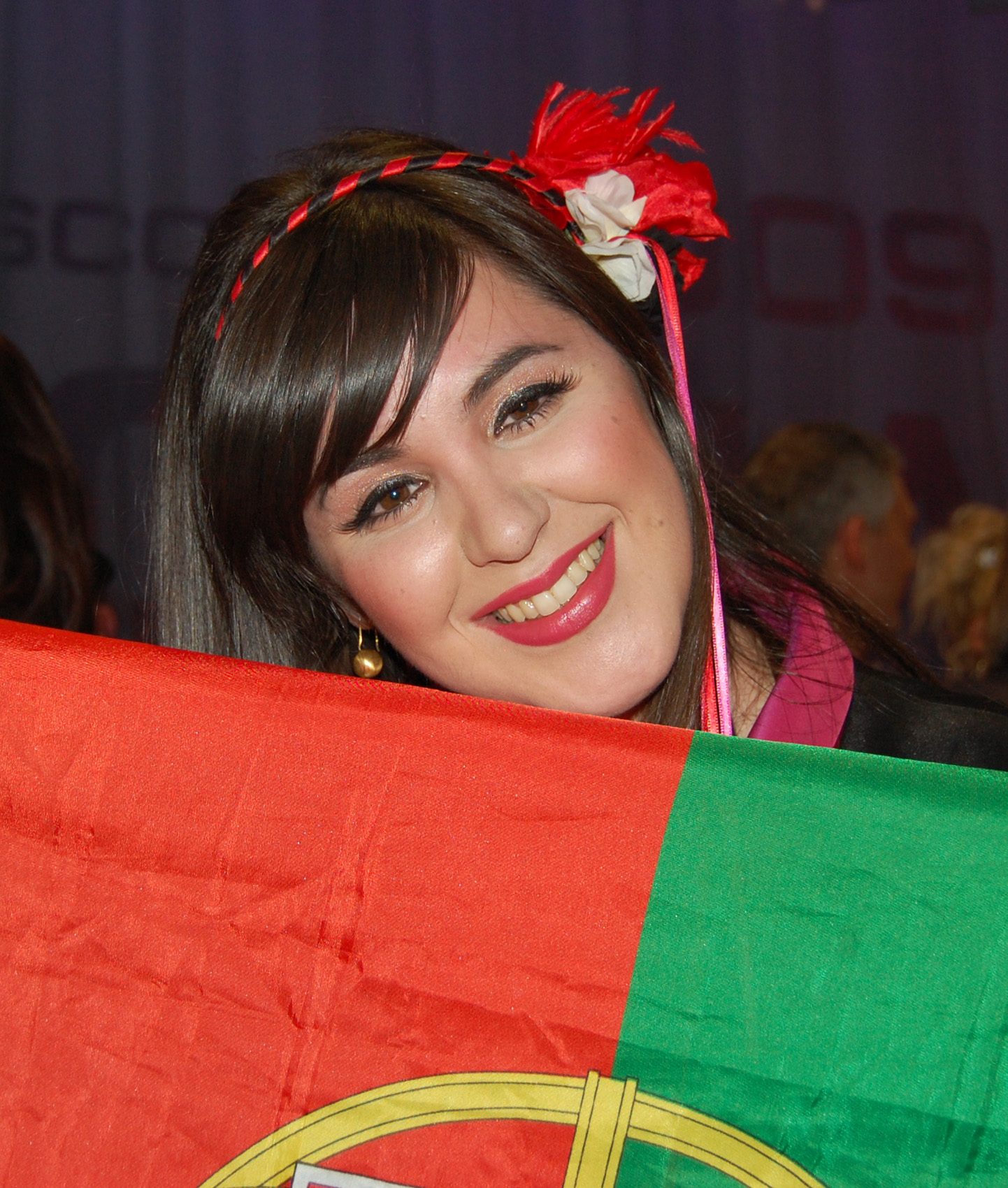
Daniela Varela at the ESC 2009 final

== Biography ==
=== The beginnings ===
The beginnings of Flor de Lis are closely linked to Pedro Marques' participation as a percussionist in the "Adufe" project, first conceived by José Salgueiro as an attraction for Expo-98, and which focussed on traditional Portuguese instruments. The resulting success led to several national and international events being held between 1999 and 2000, unearthing musician Pedro Marques' desire to explore the vast wealth of Portuguese music in conjunction with musical elements from other parts of the world.

The project began to take shape in 2001, with the participation of several musicians in recording sessions, one of whom was Paulo Pereira, who has stuck to wind instruments ever since.

In recent years the elements of the songs have been put together naturally, in a process involving several different approaches and instrumentalists.

=== Repertoire ===
The repertoire consists not only of original lyrics by Pedro Marques and Daniela Varela, but also poems by Eugénio de Andrade, José Régio, Ary dos Santos, David-Mourão Ferreira and Maria José de Castro, among others.

The sound is based on popular Portuguese music, from fado to folk, but the end result also stems from the fusion of music from other continents, with a strong popular flavor. The vocals of Daniela Varela can be heard alongside Pedro Marques on percussion, Jose Camacho on guitar, Vasco Corisco on bass and a number of guest musicians playing cavaquinho, mandolin, flute, accordion or piano.

Daniela showed a gift for singing at an early age, appearing in Ana Faria's "Jovens Cantores de Lisboa" when she was 8, and in plays directed by Filipe La Féria such as "Jasmim ou o Sonho do Cinema" and "Godspell" after the age of 10. After a brief interregnum, when she discovered an interest in comics and illustration, she went back to live singing and joined Flor de Lis.

=== Eurovision 2009 ===
2008 was a year of significant developments, highlighted by a stable collective environment which helped to finalise arrangements and get the show on the road, with the performance at the Fábrica Braço de Prata on 26 July and the win in Portugal's national selection for Eurovision which saw them winning the opportunity of representing Portugal at the Eurovision Song Contest 2009. The song won a place in the Eurovision final on 16 May as one of ten qualifiers from the first semi-final held on 12 May, where it eventually finished 15th.

=== Return to studio releases in 2020 ===
In 2020, after some time with no new releases, Flor de Lis went back to studio to produce a new set of songs. With renovated aesthetics and an evolution in their sound, the band has practically maintained the original core elements and kept working on their compositions and live performances.

== Discography ==
=== Singles ===
Year	Single	Chart positions					Album
Year	Single	SWI	POR	BEL	UK	EU	
2009	"Todas As Ruas Do Amor"	85	-	26	158	-	Signo Solar
2010	"Lisboa Tropical"						
2011	"Maria"						
2012	"Ritmo do Mundo"						
2013	"Cinema Paraíso"						
2014	"Dona Rosa"						
2020	"Amores Assim"						
2020	“Acontecer”						
2020	“Pode chover um poema”						
2020	“Pretérito imperfeito”						

=== Studio albums ===
Year	Album	Chart positions	Sales	Certifications (sales thresholds)
Year	Album	POR	Sales	Certifications (sales thresholds)
2010	Signo Solar: First studio album; Released: 2010		POR:	

Preceded by Vânia Fernandes with "Senhora do mar (Negras águas)"	Festival da Canção Winner; 2009	Succeeded by Filipa Azevedo with "Há dias assim"
Preceded by Vânia Fernandes with "Senhora do mar (Negras águas)"	Portugal in the Eurovision Song Contest; 2009	Succeeded by Filipa Azevedo with "Há dias assim"
