= The Floating Box: A Story in Chinatown =

The Floating Box: A Story in Chinatown is a chamber opera by Jason Kao Hwang, to a libretto by Catherine Filloux. It premiered in 2001, directed by Jean Randich and conducted by Juan Carlos Rivas. The original cast was Sandia Ang (Soprano), Ryu-Kyung Kim (Mezzo-contralto), and Zheng Zhou (Baritone).

Instrumentation for the opera includes many traditional Chinese instruments, including the pipa, gaohu, erhu, and zhonghu, heard together with western instruments including the piccolo, flute, alto flute, B flat clarinet, bass clarinet, cello, accordion, vibraphone and other percussion instruments.

The opera has been recorded on New World Records, with the original cast and conductor.
