= Maria Jonas =

German opera singer (1957–2024)

Maria Jonas (21 July 1957 – 23 December 2024) was a German operatic mezzo-soprano.

== Biography ==
Jonas was born in Brühl, near Cologne. Following her studies at the Hochschule für Musik und Tanz Köln she went to Venezuela where she founded a music school. After her return to Europe she was trained by Jessica Cash in London and by René Jacobs at the Schola Cantorum Basiliensis in Basel, Switzerland.

Jonas specialized in early, contemporary and improvised music. She was a sought-after concert-soloist and made European tours and went to Australia working with renowned conductors.

In 2000, she performed at Carnegie Hall, and in Philip Glass's opera White Raven.

Jonas founded the ensemble Ars Choralis Coeln in 2004. Jonas was a singing teacher at the University of Music and Theatre Leipzig and at the Folkwang University of the Arts in Essen from 1999. She was also a guest lecturer at several conservatories, including the Fontys School of Fine and Performing Arts in Tilburg, the Netherlands.

Jonas died on 23 December 2024.
