= Augusto Madureira =

Portuguese journalist and songwriter (born 1967)

Augusto Madureira (born 1967) is a Portuguese journalist and songwriter.

== Biography ==
Alongside journalism, Augusto Madureira has also developed some activity in the field of music, as an author and composer. In 2009, participating in the Eurovision Song Contest, he wrote the song "O Teu Lugar" (English: Your Place), played by Filipa Baptista. In 2010 he returned to the competition, as the author of the song "Há Dias Assim," sung by Filipa Azevedo and winner of the Portuguese preselection.
