= Jessica Cash =

British soprano and voice coach (1938/1939 – 2023)

Jessica Cash (1939 – 4 August 2023) was a British soprano and voice coach. Trained at the Royal College of Music, Cash was a regular performer during the 1960s and 1970s at the Glyndebourne Festival, where her interpretation in 1968 of the Queen of the Night in Mozart's Die Zauberflöte, conducted by Myer Fredman, was particularly noted. She remained part of the production until 1971, when it toured Opera Scotland in spring. She also performed with Kent Opera, and with the Welsh National Opera. In 1975 she took part in a performance of Monteverdi's L'incoronazione di Poppea at the Proms conducted by Roger Norrington, as Pallade, Damigella and Virtù, alongside Sarah Walker in the title role.

Among her students were Elizabeth Anker, Lesley Garrett, Maria Jonas, Dame Emma Kirkby and Evelyn Tubb.

Cash died on 4 August 2023, aged 84, at her home in Derbyshire.
