= Homens da Luta =

Portuguese band and comedy group

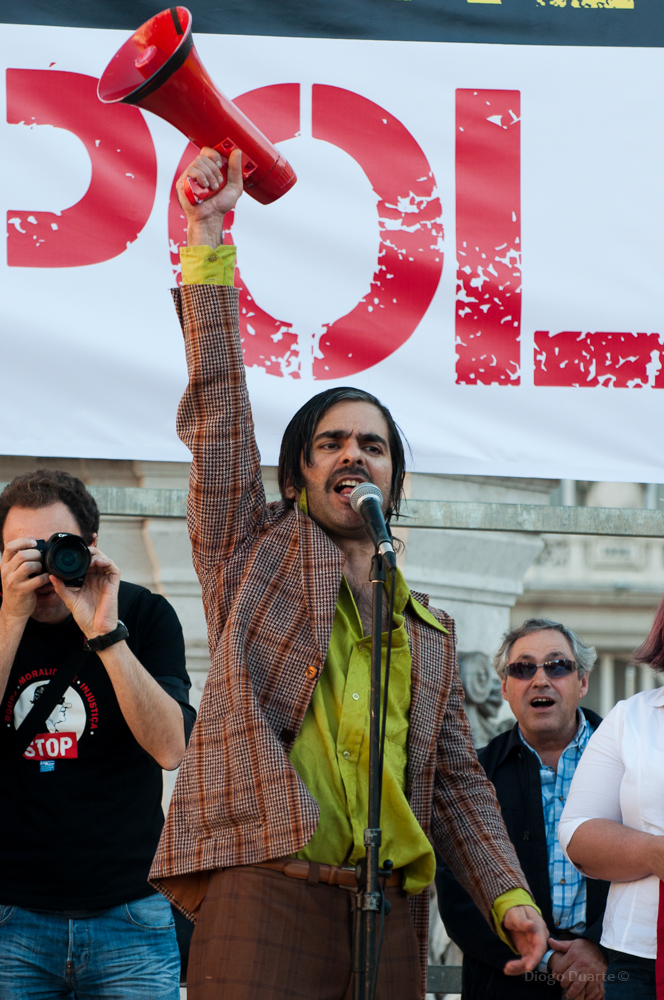
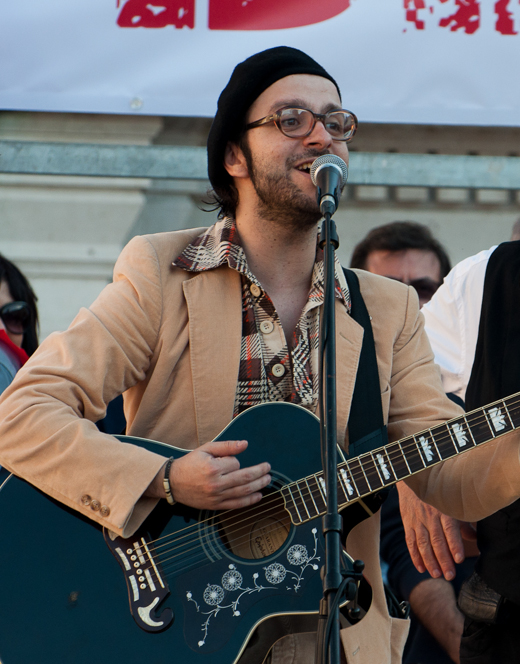
- Homens da Luta in 2011. From left: "Neto" and "Falâncio"

Background information
- Origin: Lisbon, Portugal
- Genres: Comedy; Folk; Protest song
- Years active: 2006–2013
- Past members: Nuno Duarte ("Neto"); Vasco Duarte ("Falâncio")

Homens da Luta (English: Men of the Struggle) were a Portuguese improvisational comedy and musical street performance duo consisting of brothers Nuno Duarte ("Neto") and Vasco Duarte ("Falâncio"). Their songs are a parody of protest songs sung during the period that followed the 1974 Carnation Revolution, and the characters played are caricatures of the revolutionary singers of the time, such as José Afonso and José Mário Branco. Homens da Luta often used the term luta (which means "struggle" or "fight") to invoke slogans that became famous during the Portuguese revolutionary period, such as "A Luta Continua" (The Struggle Goes On).

In 2010, Homens da Luta released a 14-song album named A Canção é uma arma (The song is a weapon). It was physically released as an MP3 Player, which they called the "LPOD", short for "Luta-Pod", as a parody of the iPod.

== Eurovision Song Contest ==
In 2010, Homens da Luta took part in the RTP Song Festival 2010, with the song "Luta assim não dá" (The struggle can't go on like this). The song was disqualified as it had been previously performed, which was a breach of the rules of the Festival and the international ESC.

In 2011, they entered the contest again with the song "A luta é alegria" (The struggle is joy), lyrics by Nuno Duarte "Jel" and composed by Vasco Duarte. They were in sixth place until the public vote was counted, at which point they ended up on the first place, winning a place in Düsseldorf. They represented Portugal at the Eurovision Song Contest 2011 in Düsseldorf, Germany, but did not gain enough votes from other countries for a place in the final round. Since the group are comedians and not singers, and because their victory was also based on popular support rather than the selected jury, there were some negative reactions to their win on the site of the contest.

== Discography ==
=== Studio albums ===
- A Canção é uma arma (2010)

=== Singles ===
- "A luta é alegria" (2011)

Preceded by Filipa Azevedo with Há dias assim	Portugal in the Eurovision Song Contest; 2011	Succeeded by Filipa Sousa with Vida minha
