= Claudia Bernardi =

Argentine artist (born 1955)

- Born: 1955 (age 69–70); Buenos Aires, Argentina
- Education: University of Buenos Aires

Claudia Bernardi (born 1955) is an Argentine artist who works in the fields of art, human rights and social justice, combining installation, sculpture, painting and printmaking. She has worked with communities that have suffered state terror, violence, forced exiles and who are victims of human rights violations.

Two major artworks are: Tree of Life and Walls of Hope

Bernardi was born in Buenos Aires. She is Professor of Community Arts, Diversity Studies, Critical Studies at the California College of the Arts.

== Collections ==
Bernardi's work is held in the following permanent collections:

- La Salle University Art Museum, La Salle University, Philadelphia, Pennsylvania: 1 piece (as of 11 February 2022)
- Scottsdale Museum of Contemporary Art, Scottsdale, Arizona: 2 pieces (as of 11 February 2022)
- Edwin A. Ulrich Museum of Art, Wichita State University, Kansas: 1 piece (as of 20 March 2023)

== Publications ==
- The Tenacity of Memory. Palgrave Macmillan, 2018.

== In popular culture ==
Playwright Catherine Filloux wrote a one-woman play, How to Eat an Orange, about Bernardi, set to premiere at La Mama in New York City in 2024.
