= Luísa Costa Gomes =

Portuguese chronicler, librettist, novelist, playwright and screenwriter

- Occupations: Chronicler, librettist, novelist, playwright, screenwriter

Luísa Costa Gomes (born in Lisbon, June 16, 1954) is a Portuguese chronicler, librettist, novelist, playwright and screenwriter.

== Biography ==
Luísa Costa Gomes has a degree in philosophy from Universidade de Lisboa and was a high school teacher. Her first published piece was "13 Contos de Sobressalto" (1982) and from then on she wrote short stories, novels and theater. She collaborated with newspaper O Independente, Público and Diário de Notícias as chronicle writer. Luísa works with literary translation, namely for theater, and edited magazine Ficções dedicated to short stories both by Portuguese and foreign authors. Costa Gomes also co-writes works, such as the novel "O Defunto Elegante", together with Abel Barros Baptista; the libretto for "O Corvo Branco", opera by Philip Glass and staged by Bob Wilson, debuted at the Expo 98 in Lisbon; the cantata "Sobre o Vulcão", with music by Luís Bragança Gil.

== Awards ==
Costa Gomes received the award "Prémio D. Dinis" in 1988 by "Fundação da Casa de Mateus" for her novel O Pequeno Mundo. She was awarded in 1994 the Prémio Máxima de Literatura for her novel Olhos Verdes. In 2010, she was also awarded the Prémio Fernando Namora for the novel Ilusão ou O Que Quiserem.

== Works ==
=== Short stories ===
- "Treze contos de sobressalto" (Bertrand, 1982)
- O Gémeo Diferente (Difel, 1984)
- Contos Outra Vez (Cotovia, 1997) Grande Prémio de Conto Camilo Castelo Branco
- Império do Amor (Tinta Permanente, 2002)
- Setembro e outros contos (Dom Quixote, 2007)

=== Novel ===
- O Pequeno Mundo (Quetzal, 1988)
- Vida de Ramón (Dom Quixote, 1994)
- Olhos Verdes (Dom Quixote, 1994)
- O Defunto Elegante - com Abel Barros Baptista (Relógio d’Água, 1996)
- Educação para a Tristeza (Editorial Presença, 1998)
- A Pirata (Dom Quixote, 2006)
- Ilusão (ou o que quiserem) (Dom Quixote, 2009)
- Cláudio e Constantino (Dom Quixote, 2014)

=== Theater ===
- Nunca Nada de Ninguém (Cotovia, 1991)
- Ubardo (Dom Quixote, 1993)
- A Minha Austrália (Dom Quixote, 1993)
- Clamor (Cotovia, 1994)
- Duas Comédias (Relógio d’Água, 1996)
- Vanessa vai á luta (1997)
- O Céu de Sacadura (Cotovia, 1998)
- A Vida em Vénus (2007)

=== Opera ===
- O Corvo Branco (Expo Lisboa 1998)
- Educação para a Tristeza
- Relicário Perpétuo (2026)

=== Screenplay ===
- The Baron (screenplay)
