= The Civil Wars: A Tree Is Best Measured When It Is Down =

Opera by Robert Wilson

the CIVIL warS: a tree is best measured when it is down
- Opera by Philip Glass, David Byrne, Gavin Bryars, Nicolas Economou, Hans Peter Kuhn, and others
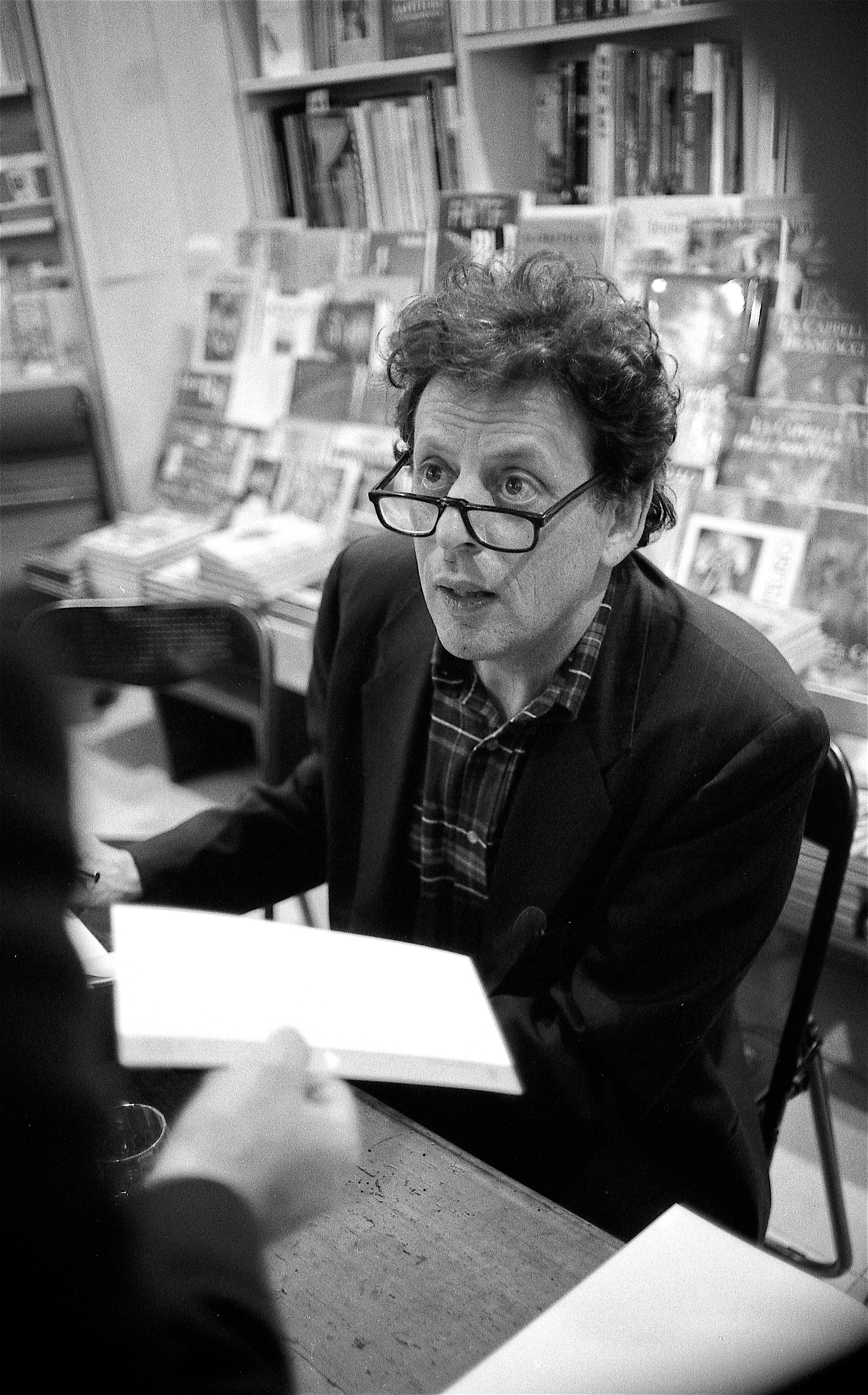
- Glass in Florence, 1993
- Librettist: Robert Wilson; Heiner Müller; Maita di Niscemi; Etel Adnan
- Premiere: Minneapolis section: April 1984; Cologne section: January 19, 1984; Rome section: March 1984; Rotterdam section: 1983; Marseille section: not performed

the CIVIL warS: a tree is best measured when it is down is an opera created in the early 1980s by director Robert Wilson to music by Philip Glass, David Byrne, Gavin Bryars and others. The vast five-act work has never been performed whole.

Originally, The Civil Wars was conceived as a single daylong piece of music theatre to accompany the 1984 Summer Olympics. Six composers from six countries were to compose sections of Wilson's text. After initial premieres in their countries of origin, the six parts were to be fused in one epic performance in Los Angeles during the games, a parallel to the internationalist ideals of the Olympic movement.

The premiere of the full work was cancelled when funding failed to materialize (despite the Olympic Committee's offer of matching funds) and deadlines were not met. But four of the six sections had full productions under Wilson's direction in Minneapolis, Rome, Rotterdam and Cologne, with workshop productions of the other two sections in Tokyo and Marseille.

The Civil Wars, as presented by American Repertory Theatre in Cambridge, Massachusetts, was the only work recommended by the jury of the 1986 Pulitzer Prize for Drama, composed of critics Mel Gussow, Edwin Wilson and Bernard Weiner. The recommendation was unanimous. However, the Pulitzer board declined to award the prize.

A documentary on the work's creative process, Robert Wilson and the Civil Wars, was released in 1987.

== Minneapolis section: The Knee Plays ==
The American section of The Civil Wars was a series of twelve brief interludes intended to connect the larger scenes and provide time for set changes. David Byrne was the composer of these mostly wordless pieces, and choreography was by Suzushi Hanayagi. The Knee Plays premiered in April 1984 at the Walker Art Center.

With no singers, The Knee Plays told its story through nine dancers wearing white doctor's smocks. The style of presentation was influenced by Japanese Bunraku puppetry and Noh and Kabuki theater. The designs, by Jun Matsuno with Wilson and Byrne, were modular white squares resembling Japanese shoji screens that moved fluidly to redefine the space for each scene.

Byrne's music, however, took its inspiration not from Japan but from the Dirty Dozen Brass Band of New Orleans. The instrumentation was for a brass ensemble, and incorporated a number of traditional tunes, including "In the Upper Room", "Social Studies (The Gift of Sound)", "Theadora is Dozing", and "Things to Do (I've Tried)". Byrne released the music on the album Music for "The Knee Plays".

New York Times critic John Rockwell wrote "The 'plot' traces the transformation of a tree into a boat into a book into a tree again, almost as a cycle of nature [...] All of which means little in words, but much in stage pictures."

Wilson coined the term "knee play", meaning an interlude between scenes, for the opera Einstein on the Beach. The term emerges from Wilson's conception of these pieces as connective tissue linking the "meat" of a performance.

== Cologne section ==
The Cologne section comprised the first scene of Act I, the final scene of Act III, and all of Act IV. Wilson collaborated on the libretto with German playwright Heiner Müller, and also incorporated text from Racine and Shakespeare. The primary composer was Hans Peter Kuhn, with additional material by Michael Galasso, Philip Glass, David Byrne, Franz Schubert, and traditional Japanese gagaku music. The piece was premiered on January 19, 1984, at the Schauspiel Köln or Cologne Opera, Germany.

This section is more musical theatre than opera, with spoken dialogue predominating. Frederick the Great of Prussia is the central character, and his struggle to cling to political power is paralleled in the private power struggles of a modern family under a domineering "Old Man".

The Cologne sections were performed in May 1984 in Berlin, Germany at the Berliner Theatertreffen, and in February 1985 at American Repertory Theater in Cambridge, Massachusetts.

In the New York Times, critic John Rockwell described this production:

"One scene can stand for all: Frederick, dressed in his 18th-century uniform, arises from beneath the stage on a statue stallion. He writhes and twists atop his steed, shielding his face with a Japanese mask to echo Schubert's Erlkönig song, about a child swept away by death, which is first recited by an actress floating in space behind a scrim and then mouthed to a German recording by a grotesque old woman clutching a live little dog. Behind the woman on the scrim, remarkable color film footage of an eagle is projected, the proud bird swooping and soaring."

The production divided the critics of MIT's newspaper, The Tech. Michiel Bos wrote, "Tension is built up, maintained and relaxed with supreme skill. Timing is crucial and perfect: every move, every pause, every sound, every silence has its just measure." But Eric Ristad saw the piece as being hermetic to the point of opacity, of being "private theater with a vengeance; it is without content, and immune from criticism. [...] The piece just exists, and we react to it individually, in much the same way we might react to a drop of water."

== Rome section ==
The Rome section includes all of Act V. It is a full operatic setting by Philip Glass, and Wilson collaborated with Maita di Niscemi on the text, which is in Latin, Italian, and English. The Rome section premiered in March 1984 at the Teatro dell'Opera di Roma, conducted by Marcello Panni, with Luigi Petroni as Garibaldi.

The act is divided into a prologue and two scenes. In the prologue, the Earth Mother and a Snow Owl duet before being joined by Abraham Lincoln in a prayer for peace. In Scene A, Giuseppe Garibaldi (who fought for the unification of Italy) sings while his soldiers face off against a group of Hopi dancers. Scene B is dominated by two spoken narrations: the first by Robert E. Lee (who spins weightlessly as if in outer space as he speaks), and the second by the grieving, mentally ill Mary Todd Lincoln. Throughout, an octet of characters from Greek mythology comments with excerpts from Hercules Furens and Hercules Oetaeus by Seneca the Younger.

Philip Glass began composing the music for the Rome section late in the creative process, after Robert Wilson had already planned and videotaped a complete silent version of the drama. Glass's role was similar to that of a film composer, tailoring his music to the rhythm of the action rather than imposing his own tempo. Glass would later repeat this process with La Belle et la Bête, an opera intended to be performed as a synchronized soundtrack to showings of Jean Cocteau's classic film.

The Rome section was documented by the American Composers Orchestra in 1999 under the influence of Dennis Russell Davies. The cast was as follows: Robert Wilson as General Lee, Giuseppe Sabbatini as Garibaldi, Laurie Anderson as the Young Mrs. Lincoln, Denyce Graves as the older Mrs. Lincoln and the Earth Mother, Zheng Zhou as Abraham Lincoln, Sondra Radvanovsky as the Snow Owl and Alcmene, and Stephen Morscheck as Hercules. The Morgan State University Choir sang under the direction of Dr. Nathan Carter.

== Rotterdam section ==
This section's music was composed by Nicolas Economou, and it premiered in 1983. The production's design echoed the look of landscapes of The Netherlands, and Robert Wilson's text, a Dutch-language adaptation of “Jack and the Beanstalk”, contained such characters and images as Mata Hari, Queen Wilhelmina, William the Silent, cabbages, tulips, and a solitary Union Army soldier in a nonspeaking part. The original Rotterdam production featured video art by Jaap Drupsteen.

== Tokyo section ==
The score of the Tokyo section, for tape and chamber ensemble, was by Jō Kondō and was to star David Bowie as Abraham Lincoln reciting the Gettysburg Address in Japanese. The section consisted of three (originally four) scenes loosely inspired by Noh and Kabuki theatre, with sets designed by Setsu Asakura. Funding was provided by Pierre Cardin, with a premiere scheduled for February 23, 1984. Although the work was workshopped, it did not premiere.

== Marseille section ==
Gavin Bryars was a principal composer for this section, and a principal writer was Lebanese poet Etel Adnan, though the collage-like libretto incorporated a diverse collection of texts. Bryars set a speech by Marie Curie, "I am among those who believe that science has a great beauty", a poem by Pope Leo XIII on the then-new art of photography, and a speech by an imaginary scientist in Jules Verne's 1870 novel Twenty Thousand Leagues Under the Seas.

The work was not completed or publicly performed, but Bryars incorporated a number of its arias into the later works Effarene and On Photography.
