= Catherine Filloux =

American dramatist

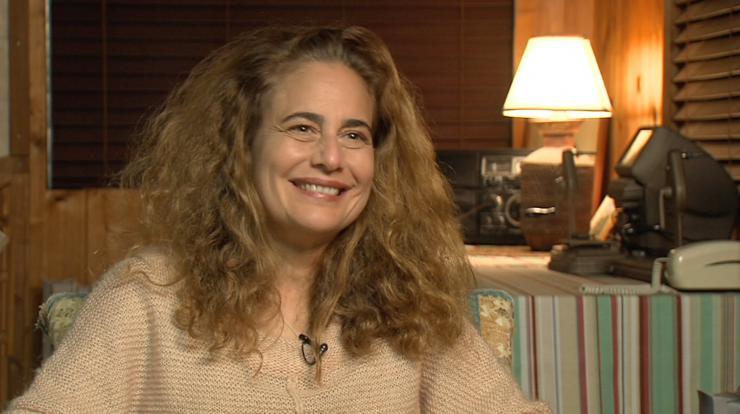
- Education: Tisch School of the Arts at New York University
- Occupation: Playwright/Librettist
- Website: http://catherinefilloux.com/

Catherine Filloux is an American playwright and librettist of French and Algerian descent. Her work has addressed human rights, social justice, political violence, migration, war, genocide, and environmental issues. She has written plays, opera libretti, musicals, and other dramatic works that have been produced in the United States and internationally. Her plays include Eyes of the Heart, Lemkin's House, Killing the Boss, Dog and Wolf, Kidnap Road, Selma '65, whatdoesfreemean?, White Savior, How to Eat an Orange, and Third Person. She has also written libretti for operas including The Floating Box, Where Elephants Weep, New Arrivals, and Orlando. Her libretto for Orlando, written with composer Olga Neuwirth and based on the novel by Virginia Woolf, received the 2022 Grawemeyer Award.

== Biography ==
Filloux's mother is from Oran, Algeria and her father from Guéret, France. Of her parents, Filloux says, "My dad was born in the center of France, and he became an adventurer," who sailed from France to New York in a catamaran. "My mom was a very literate person who loved literature" and wrote poetry in both French and English. As a child, Filloux moved with her family to San Diego, where she grew up. She says, "We grew up... in this kind of schism of Algeria, France, and San Diego. So it made for a background of not really knowing where one belongs..."

Filloux received her MFA in dramatic writing from Tisch School of the Arts at New York University (NYU) and her French baccalaureate with honors in Toulon, France.

== Career ==
Filloux began her career in theatre as an actor before concentrating on playwriting. Her work has developed around historical events, human-rights issues, migration, political conflict, and the experiences of people affected by violence and displacement. She has written about Cambodia, Bosnia, Colombia, Argentina, the United States civil-rights movement, immigration, mass incarceration, and other subjects. Her plays have been produced in New York and elsewhere in the United States, as well as internationally.

=== Cambodia and human-rights theatre ===
Cambodia has been a recurring subject in Filloux's work. She became interested in the aftermath of the Khmer Rouge period after learning about Cambodian women who experienced psychosomatic blindness after witnessing massacres. Her research contributed to Eyes of the Heart, which was first developed through the Bay Area Playwrights Festival and subsequently produced by the National Asian American Theatre Company.

Filloux also developed A Circle of Grace, an oral-history project with the Cambodian Women's Group at St. Rita's Refugee Center in the Bronx. The project involved collecting and presenting accounts connected to Cambodian survivors and their experiences. She subsequently wrote several other works connected to Cambodia, including Silence of God and Photographs From S-21. Her work on Cambodia has also included travel, workshops, readings, and collaborations with artists and organizations in the country.

=== Historical and political subjects ===
Several of Filloux's plays have used historical figures and events as the basis for dramatic exploration. Lemkin's House, first produced in the mid-2000s, concerns Raphael Lemkin, the Polish-Jewish lawyer who coined the term "genocide" and campaigned for its recognition in international law. The play was produced in the United States and Europe, including Sarajevo and Brussels.

Killing the Boss was produced at the Cherry Lane Theatre in New York in 2008. Dog and Wolf, which premiered in New York in 2010, centers on a Bosnian refugee and an American asylum lawyer and addresses questions of identity, immigration, sexuality, and displacement.

Selma '65, which premiered at La MaMa in New York in 2014, deals with the civil-rights movement and the Ku Klux Klan.The play was subsequently presented at venues in the United States. Luz, also produced at La MaMa, addressed immigration, citizenship, and deportation. Kidnap Road, which premiered at La MaMa in 2017, was inspired by the captivity of Colombian politician Ingrid Betancourt.

Her play whatdoesfreemean?, which premiered at Nora's Playhouse in 2018, explored women and mass incarceration in the United States. Her work has also included turning your body into a compass, a livestream theatre project developed with CultureHub.

=== How to Eat an Orange ===
In 2024, Filloux's How to Eat an Orange premiered at La MaMa in New York. The play was commissioned by INTAR and was based on the writings and experiences of Argentine visual artist and activist Claudia Bernardi. The production examined Bernardi's childhood during Argentina's military dictatorship and her later work dealing with memory, forensic investigation, and the aftermath of political violence.

The play was subsequently published by Next Stage Press. A scholarly discussion of the work, involving Filloux and Bernardi, was published in Literature and Arts of the Americas in 2026.

=== White Savior and Third Person ===
Filloux's White Savior was nominated for the inaugural 2023–25 Venturous List and was included in the Theater555 reading series. The play was presented in 2025 at Soapbox Gallery in Brooklyn.

In September 2025, her play Third Person premiered at CultureHub in New York. An epistolary work told through letters, emails, and dictated messages, the play centers on a teenager, his mother and teacher, and a parent who is the chief executive of a defense company. The production was directed by Elena Araoz.

=== Musical theatre ===
Filloux collaborated with composer Jimmy Roberts and writer John Daggett on the musical Welcome to the Big Dipper, based on her earlier play All Dressed Up and Nowhere to Go. The musical premiered Off-Broadway at the York Theatre in November 2024, with Filloux and Daggett credited as book writers and Roberts as composer and lyricist.

The musical was a finalist for the National Alliance for Musical Theatre and had previously received a workshop at the Redhouse Arts Center in Syracuse. An original cast recording was released in October 2025.

=== Opera ===
Filloux has worked as a librettist. Her opera collaborations include The Floating Box: A Story in Chinatown, with composer Jason Kao Hwang; Where Elephants Weep, with Cambodian composer Him Sophy; and New Arrivals, with composer John Glover for Houston Grand Opera. The Floating Box was selected as an Opera News Critics' Choice and was later released by New World Records. Where Elephants Weep was produced in Phnom Penh and broadcast on Cambodian television.

Her most prominent opera collaboration has been Orlando, composed by Olga Neuwirth and based on Virginia Woolf's novel. Filloux and Neuwirth jointly wrote the libretto. The opera premiered at the Vienna State Opera in 2019 and received the 2022 Grawemeyer Award. In 2026, Orlando received its Berlin premiere at the Komische Oper Berlin.

Filloux has also developed other opera projects, including L'Orient, created with composer Kamala Sankaram and choreographer Preeti Vasudevan, and Blued Trees, with composer Julia Schwartz and eco-artist Aviva Rahmani.

=== Recent work ===
In 2026, Filloux began developing the Olivia Project, a trilogy of plays addressing environmental issues. The first work, Olivia, is a two-woman play concerning fossil-fuel dependence, climate activism, and conflict between generations. It received a staged reading in New York in February 2026.

The second play in the trilogy, Medusa, received its first public reading in New York in July 2026. It focuses on a young caregiver whose relationship with the ocean and environmental preservation becomes intertwined with her employment and personal circumstances.

The third play, Deep Time, received a xxx reading in New York in October 2026. It continues the environmental themes of the trilogy and addresses the environmental crisis and the human choices surrounding it.

Filloux also conceived the story and is the librettist xxx of Allegra & the Cello, in Movements, a new opera with music by Julia Schwartz. The world premiere is scheduled for December 10–20, 2026, at La MaMa Experimental Theatre Club in New York. The opera centers on a woman doctor facing a high-stakes trial and uses a soprano and cello as its two performers. Xxx not sure why this is in bold.

=== International and community work ===
Filloux's theatrical work has taken her to countries and regions affected by political conflict and social upheaval, including Bosnia and Herzegovina, Cambodia, Guatemala, Haiti, Iraq, Morocco, Northern Ireland, Sudan, and South Sudan. She participated in an overseas reading tour to Sudan and South Sudan through the University of Iowa's International Writing Program and was a Fulbright Senior Specialist in Cambodia and Morocco.

She is a co-founder and co-director of Theatre Without Borders, a volunteer organization connecting theatre artists across national and cultural boundaries. She has also been involved with CultureHub and has served as its board president.

Filloux was featured in the documentary and interdisciplinary project Acting Together on the World Stage: Performance and the Creative Transformation of Conflict, which examines the use of performance in peacebuilding and conflict transformation.

In addition to theatre, she has contributed essays and chapters on theatre, activism, human rights, and artistic practice. Her chapter "Calls to Action: Collaboration across Difference" appeared in the 2024 Routledge volume Theatre Responds to Social Trauma: Chasing the Demons.

She has also worked with Rehabilitation Through the Arts on the development of films for the Reimagining Myself prison reentry program.

Filloux has been interviewed for podcasts concerning theatre, human rights, and her work as a playwright and librettist, including Not to Forgive but to Understand and StoryBeat.

== Works ==
=== Plays (selected productions) ===
- How to Eat an Orange
  - "How to Eat an Orange" is a world premiere play by Filloux produced at La MaMa Theatre, New York City, Spring 2024 about Argentinian visual artist/activist Claudia Bernardi surviving under Argentina's military junta; her artwork excavating genocide; and fighting for international justice. With community outreach programming. (Commissioned by INTAR, for a virtual workshop.)
- Under the Skin
  - 2021 Based on the writing of Claudia Bernardi; Created for and developed with Mercedes Herrero; Commissioned by INTAR; Virtual Workshop, Lou Moreno, artistic director, and Paul Slee Rodriguez, executive director, New York, NY
- White Savior
  - 2020 Pygmalion Productions, Rose Wagner Performing Arts Center, Salt Lake City, UT
- turning your body into a compass
  - 2019 A Live Stream Web Story, Culture Hub and Chaotic Sequence Productions; Directed by Daria Sommers; Produced by Daria Sommers and Arthur Vincie; Theatre Director DeMone Seraphin; Livestreaming and video production by CultureHub, New York, NY
- whatdoesfreemean
  - 2018 Premiere, Nora's Playhouse, (New York, NY)
  - 2016 Readings at John Jay College of Criminal Justice, and College and Community Fellowship, (New York, NY)
- Kidnap Road
  - 2017 Premiere at La MaMa, 55th Season, (New York, NY)
  - 2016 Presented by Anna Deavere Smith, NYU's Institute on the Arts and Civic Dialogue, (New York, NY)
  - 2015 Presented by Joan B. Kroc Institute for Peace and Justice (IPJ) & School of Peace Studies, University of San Diego, The Art of Peace symposium
  - 2015 Headline for Planet Connections Staged Reading Series, Paradise Factory, New York, NY
- Selma '65
  - 2014-2015 premiere at La Mama 53rd season, (commissioned by Marietta Hedges), New York, NY; US tour to venues around the US
- Mock Court (Play Commission)
  - 2014 Book Wings Iraq, a collaborative bilingual theatre initiative produced in partnership with The University of Iowa's International Writing Program and the Bureau of Educational and Cultural Affairs at the U.S. Department of State. Iowa City, Iowa, and Baghdad, Iraq.
- Luz
  - 2012 La MaMa, 51st Season, New York, New York
- Dog and Wolf
  - 2010 59E59 Theaters, New York, New York
  - (Developed at The Playwrights' Center, Minneapolis, Minnesota& New York Theatre Workshop, New York, New York)
- 2010 Dog and Wolf Community Outreach Project (Watson Arts): Bronx, Brooklyn, Manhattan and Queens, New York
- Killing the Boss
  - 2008 Cherry Lane Theatre, New York, New York
- Lemkin's House
  - 2007 Season, Rideau de Bruxelles, Brussels, Belgium
  - 2006 McGinn-Cazale Theatre, New York, New York; Producers: Vital Theatre Co. & Body Politic Theater
  - 2006 Season, 78th Street Theatre Lab, New York, New York
  - 2005 Season, Kamerni Teatar 55, Sarajevo, Bosnia; & Roxy Art House, Edinburgh, Scotland
  - 2005 U.S. Holocaust Memorial Museum, Washington, DC, (Reading co-sponsored by Theater J)
- The Breach (with Tarell McCraney and Joe Sutton)
  - 2008 Season, Seattle Repertory Theatre, Seattle, Washington
  - 2007 Season, Southern Rep, New Orleans, Louisiana (Premiere/Commission)
- The Beauty Inside
  - 2005 Season, New Georges, New York, New York (co-produced with InterAct Theatre Co., Philadelphia, Pennsylvania)
- Eyes of the Heart
  - 2004 Season, National Asian American Theatre Company (NAATCO), New York, New York
  - 2002 25th Bay Area Playwrights Festival, San Francisco, California
- Escuela del Mundo
  - 2006/2005 Seasons, The Ohio State University Theatre Department, Columbus, Ohio, with the Office of International Affairs; Toured high schools in Ohio (Premiere/Commission)
- Silence of God
  - 2002 Season, Contemporary American Theater Festival, Shepherdstown, West Virginia (Premiere/Commission)
- Mary and Myra
  - 2002 Season, Todd Mountain Theater Project, Roxbury, New York
  - 2000 Season, Contemporary American Theater Festival, Shepherdstown, West Virginia
  - (Videorecording of CATF Production in New York Public Library for Performing Arts, Lincoln Center)
- Arthur's War
  - 2002 Theatreworks/USA, New York, New York (commission) (Music by Jenny Giering)
- Price of Madness
  - 1996 Season, Emerging Artists Theatre Company, INTAR, New York, New York
- All Dressed Up and Nowhere to Go
  - Ongoing development for musical with composer Jimmy Roberts (I Love You, You're Perfect, Now Change) and John Daggett
  - 2009 Lyman Center for the Performing Arts, Southern Connecticut State University, New Haven, Connecticut
  - 1994 Season, Playwrights Theatre of Baltimore, Baltimore, Maryland
- Venus in the Birdbath
  - 1990 Season, Alleyway Theatre, Buffalo, New York
- Cut To: The Deal
  - 2002 Season, Theatre XX, Milwaukee, Wisconsin
  - 1988 Season, Brooklyn Playworks, Brooklyn, New York
- Three Continents
  - 1998 InterAct Theatre Co., Philadelphia, Pennsylvania (Reading)
  - 1997 New Georges, New York, New York (Reading)
- Photos from S-21 (A Short Play)
  - Produced in the U.S. and around the world, including Cambodia (in Khmer), Singapore, Thailand, India, Denmark, England and France.
- BPV, Passion.com, Marriage À Trois, The G Word, Lessons Of My Father, Storks, The Sun Always Rose, The Russian Doll, White Trash, Visiting Hours
  - These short plays were produced at Play2C Studio Berlin, Germany; HB Playwrights Theatre, New York, New York; Immigrants' Theatre Project/Women Without Borders, New York, New York; New Georges, "Watch This Space: A New Georges Anthology", HERE, New York, New York; Lincoln Center Theater Directors Lab & Culture Project's "Brothers Karamazov", New York, New York; Women's Project, New York, New York; Yale Cabaret, Yale University, New Haven, Connecticut; University of California, San Diego Theatre Festival, San Diego, California

=== Opera Libretti (selected productions) ===
- Orlando
  - 2021 Grawemeyer Award; ORLANDO at the Wiener Staatsoper, Vienna State Opera, based on the novel by Virginia Woolf, Catherine Filloux is the librettist with Olga Neuwirth. The premiere was December 2019.
- New Arrivals
  - 2012 Season, Houston Grand Opera, Song of Houston: East + West, Houston, Texas, Composer John Glover (Premiere/Commission)

(Librettist)

- Where Elephants Weep
  - 2008 Chenla Theater, Phnom Penh, Cambodia and CTN TV Broadcast, Composer Him Sophy (Commissioned by Cambodian Living Arts)

(Librettist)

- The Floating Box: A Story in Chinatown
  - 2001 Season, Asia Society, New York, New York, Composer Jason Kao Hwang (Premiere/Commission); New World Records CD Release (Aaron Copland Fund) (Librettist)

=== Opera Libretti ===
- 2021-20 Thresh's L'Orient, a multidisciplinary production co-created with choreographer Preeti Vasudevan and composer Kamala Sankaram, 2021 Guggenheim Works & Process, Lincoln Center, New York, NY, (Librettist)
- 2021-20 Mary Shelley, a new chamber opera, music by Gerald Cohen, dramaturg, Cori Ellison, Black Tea Music (Librettist)

=== Musical (Co-Bookwriter) ===
- Welcome to the Big Dipper with Composer Jimmy Roberts (I Love You, You're Perfect, Now Change) and Bookwriter/ Additional Lyrics John Daggett (Lemkin's House), based on Filloux's play
- 2019 Workshop, Redhouse Arts Center, Syracuse, NY, (artistic director, Hunter Foster); 2018 NAMT Finalist, New York, NY

=== Screenplays ===
- 2000 Play Eyes of the Heart: Developed for Lifetime Television
- 1999 Priscilla's Story: Screenplay treatment, Malvina Douglas Productions, New York, New York
- 1990 Alter Ego: Based on the novel, Vestments, by Alfred Alcorn
- 1988 Prodigal Son: Optioned by Justine Bateman, Bateman Co., Los Angeles, California

== Acting together on the world stage ==
Filloux is featured in Acting Together on the World Stage: Performance and the Creative Transformation of Conflict, a multi-part initiative exploring the role of artists in peacebuilding and conflict transformation. The project includes a documentary film and a book series.

- Acting Together on the World Stage: Performance and the Creative Transformation of Conflict – Filloux's profile is available on the project's website.
- Acting Together on the World Stage (Documentary film) – A documentary film accompanying the project.
- Acting Together I: Performance and the Creative Transformation of Conflict: Resistance and Reconciliation in Regions of Violence – This book includes Filloux's contributions.

== Essays, books, plays, and publications ==
- Hall of Mirrors – Mémoire(s) en jeu
- Writing Disorder – Essays
- Eyes of the Heart: Selected Plays – University of Hawai‘i Press
- Silence of God – Oberon Books
- The Wolf and the Killing of the Boss – Amazon
- Kidnap Road – Playscripts
- Luz – Amazon
- Dog and Wolf – University of Wisconsin Press
- Red Wigs and Lettuce – Brooklyn Rail
