= Theatre Camões =

- Teatro Camões
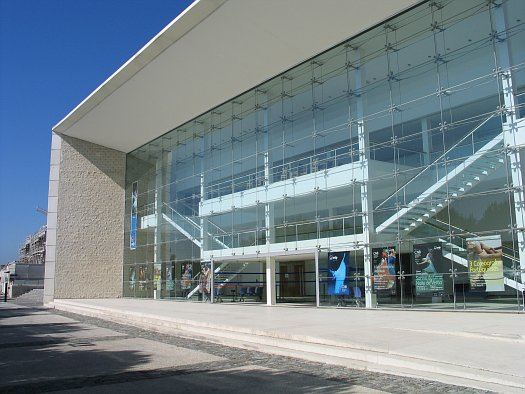
- The front facade of the Theatre Camoes central atrium

- Location of the theatre within the municipality of Lisbon

General information
- Type: Theatre
- Location: Parque das Nações, Portugal
- Coordinates: 38°45′39.6″N 9°5′36″W
- Opened: 1997
- Owner: Portuguese Republic

Design and construction
- Architect: Manuel Salgado

Theatre Camões (Portuguese: Teatro Camões) is a concert hall situated in the civil parish of Parque das Nações, municipality of Lisbon.

== History ==
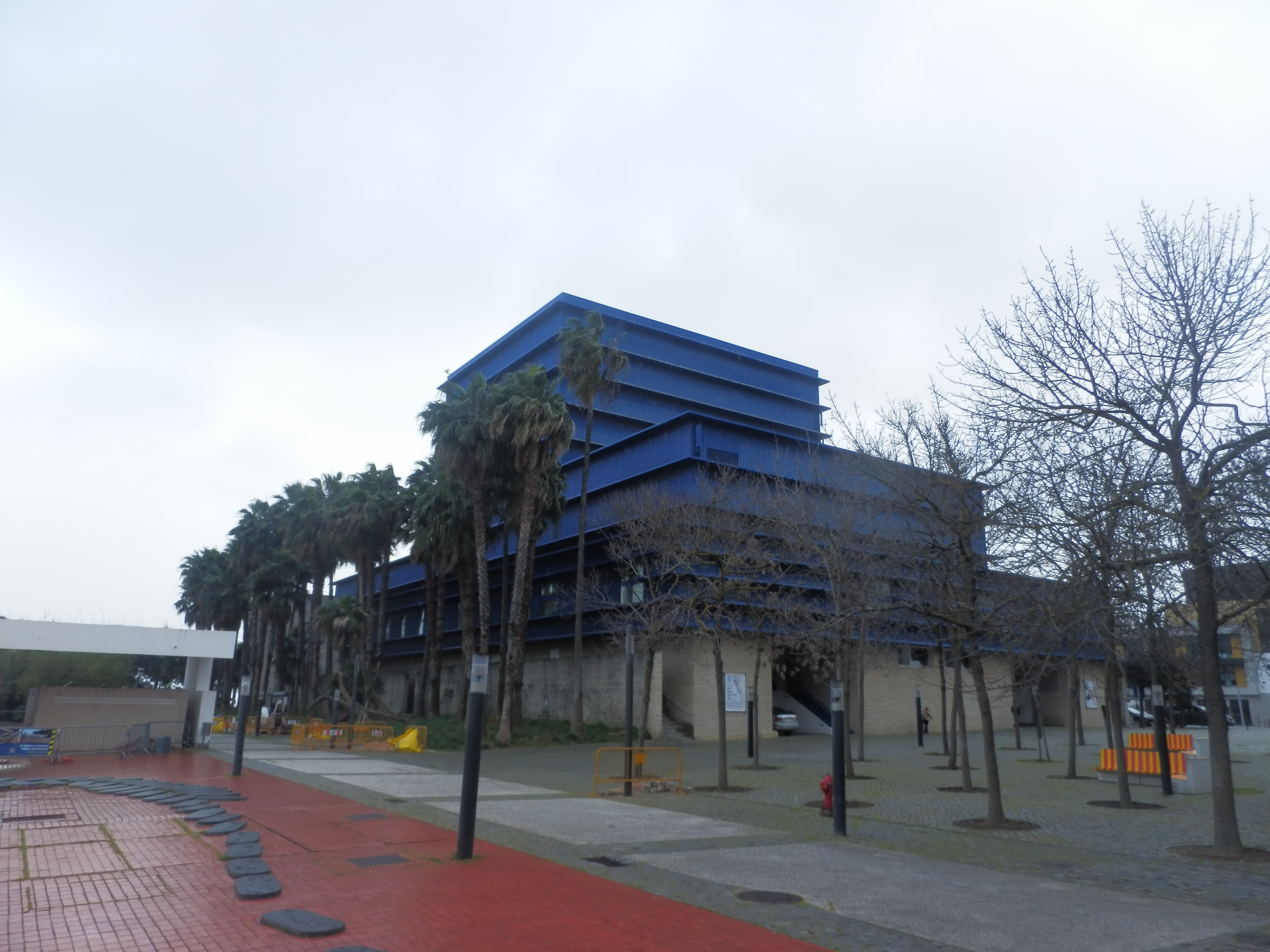
The oblique profile of the two-storey building along the Tagus River

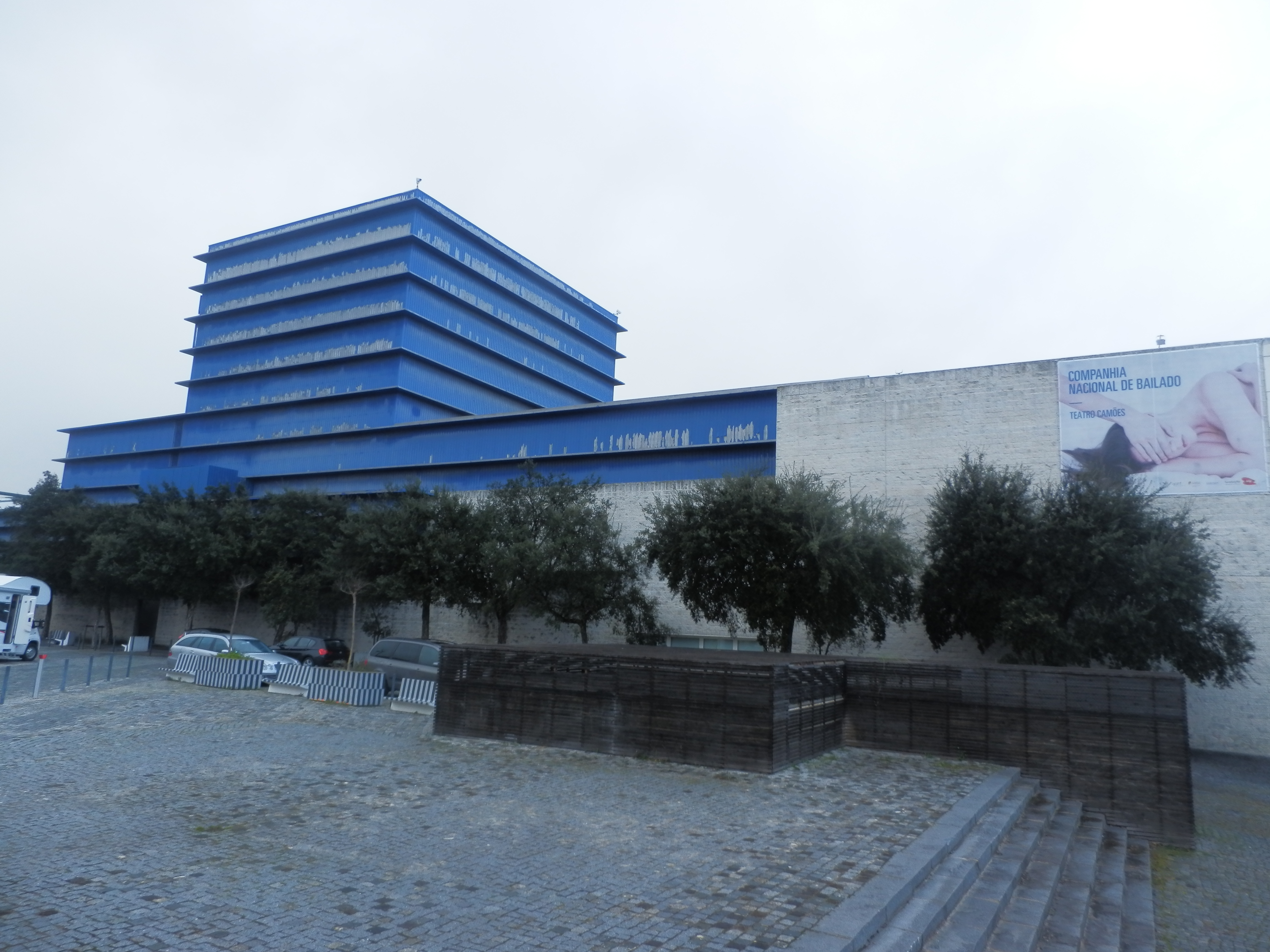
The deteriorated facade of the Theatre Camões

Originally conceived by the Gabinete de Arquitectura Risco, the building was constructed in 1997 during the International World Exhibition Expo 98, following the design laid down by Manuel Salgado. An acclaimed Portuguese architect, Manuel Salgado, was also responsible for the design of the Centro Cultural de Belem (a multi-purpose cultural centre in Lisbon) and the Estádio do Dragão (the FCP football stadium in Oporto). It was inaugurated in 1998 and has been used by the Lisbon Symphony Orchestra and the National Ballet of Portugal.

The theatre was situated in a privileged location between the southern international area and Oceans Pavilion, and was conceived with specific acoustic characteristics and auxiliary spaces in order to present opera, theatre spectacles and various musical events. At the time of its inauguration the opera O Corvo Branco, with music by Philip Glass, musical director Robert Wilson and libreto Luísa Costa Gomes, in addition to the events to celebrate national days.

Following Expo’98, the first project to expand the theatre was initiated, in order to install the headquarters for the Portuguese Symphonic Orchestra; the theatre, initially integrated into the Instituto Português das Artes e Espectáculo (IPAE) (Portuguese Institute of Arts and Spectacle) was transferred to the São Carlos National Theatre (Decree 354/99, 3 September 1998). It was defined as an extension for "cultural production and artistic character that produced, realized or welcome spectacles of theatrical, musical or dance, and that programmed complementary activities in art and culture".

In 2002, the Companhia Nacional de Bailado (National Dance Company) assumed the programming and management of the theatre; by dispatch 7721/2002 (13 March 2002), the minister for culture, Dr. Augusto Santos Silva, initiated the transition of legal and financial responsibilities of the Theatre Camões, from the National Theatre to the National Dance Company. They were ultimately authorized to assume, the programming at Theatre Camões. The theatre company took-up its management in 2003.

== Architecture ==
Integrated into the former Expo 98 grounds, today known as Parque das Nações, the theatre was built near the Pavilhão do Conhecimento and Lisbon Oceanarium. It is a simple composition that integrates with the public spaces, but visible along the pedestrian passageways along the riverbank, that includes the Passeio do Neptuno and the gardens of Jardim da Água.

The entrance to the hall is across an atrium, with a large glazed window (Mar da Palha), which is open to two floors. With three foyers, the atrium includes 304 square metres (3,270 ft^{2}) on the first floor and 233 square metres (2,510 ft^{2}) on the second floor, with support bars.

The auditorium has space for 873 visitors.

The main hall consists of a 19 by 24 metres (62 ft × 79 ft) space and stage area of approximately 19 by 22.7 metres (62 ft × 74 ft), while the orchestra pit encompasses an area 16 by 5.5 metres (52 ft × 18 ft).

== See also ==
- List of theatres and auditoriums in Lisbon
