= Portugal in the Eurovision Song Contest 2010 =

- Eurovision Song Contest 2010
- Participating broadcaster: Rádio e Televisão de Portugal (RTP)
- Country: Portugal
- Selection process: Festival da Canção 2010
- Selection date: 6 March 2010

Competing entry
- Song: "Há dias assim"
- Artist: Filipa Azevedo
- Songwriters: Augusto Madureira

Placement
- Semi-final result: Qualified (4th, 89 points)
- Final result: 18th, 43 points

Participation chronology

Portugal was represented at the Eurovision Song Contest 2010 with the song "Há dias assim" written by Augusto Madureira, and performed by Filipa Azevedo. The Portuguese participating broadcaster, Rádio e Televisão de Portugal (RTP), organised the national final Festival da Canção 2010 in order to select its entry for the contest. After two semi-finals and a final which took place in March 2010, "Há dias assim" performed by Filipa Azevedo emerged as the winner after achieving the highest score following the combination of votes from twenty regional juries and a public televote.

Portugal was drawn to compete in the first semi-final of the Eurovision Song Contest which took place on 25 May 2010. Performing during the show in position 14, "Há dias assim" was announced among the top 10 entries of the first semi-final and therefore qualified to compete in the final on 29 May. It was later revealed that Portugal placed fourth out of the 17 participating countries in the semi-final with 89 points. In the final, Portugal performed in position 23 and placed eighteenth out of the 25 participating countries with 43 points.

== Background ==
Prior to the 2010 contest, Radiotelevisão Portuguesa (RTP) until 2003, and Rádio e Televisão de Portugal (RTP) since 2004, had participated in the Eurovision Song Contest representing Portugal forty-three times since their first entry in 1964. Their highest placing in the contest was sixth, achieved in 1996 with the song "O meu coração não tem cor" performed by Lúcia Moniz. Following the introduction of semi-finals for the 2004, Portugal had featured in only two finals. Their least successful result has been last place, achieved on three occasions, most recently in 1997 with the song "Antes do adeus" performed by Célia Lawson. They have also received nul points on two occasions: in 1964 and 1997. The nation qualified to the final in 2009 and placed fifteenth with the song "Todas as ruas do amor" performed by Flor-de-Lis.

As part of its duties as participating broadcaster, RTP organises the selection of its entry in the Eurovision Song Contest and broadcasts the event in the country. The broadcaster confirmed its participation in the 2010 contest on 21 September 2009. RTP has traditionally selected its entry for the contest via the music competition Festival da Canção, with exceptions in 1988 and in 2005 when the entries were internally selected. Along with its participation confirmation, RTP revealed details regarding its selection procedure and announced the organization of Festival da Canção 2010 in order to select the 2010 Portuguese entry.

== Before Eurovision ==
=== Festival da Canção 2010 ===
The logo of Festival da Canção 2010

Festival da Canção 2010 was the 46th edition of Festival da Canção that selected Portugal's entry for the Eurovision Song Contest 2010. Twenty-four entries competed in the competition that consisted of two semi-finals held on 2 and 4 March 2010 leading to a twelve-song final on 6 March 2010. All three shows of the competition took place at the Campo Pequeno in Lisbon, hosted by Sílvia Alberto and were broadcast on RTP1, RTP1 HD, RTP África and RTP Internacional as well as online via the broadcaster's official website rtp.pt.

==== Format ====
The format of the competition consisted of three shows: two semi-finals on 2 and 4 March 2010 and the final on 6 March 2010. Each semi-final featured twelve competing entries, selected by an online vote in January 2010, from which six advanced from each show to complete the twelve song lineup in the final. Results during the semi-finals were determined exclusively by a public televote, while results during the final were determined by the 50/50 combination of votes from twenty regional juries and public televoting, which was opened following the second semi-final and closed during the final show. Both the public televote and the juries assigned points from 1–8, 10 and 12 based on the ranking developed by both streams of voting.

==== Competing entries ====
Artists and composers were able to submit their entries for the competition between 24 November 2009 and 15 January 2010. Composers of any nationality were allowed to submit entries, however artists were required to possess Portuguese citizenship and songs were required to be submitted in Portuguese. A jury panel consisting of Head of Delegation for Portugal at the Eurovision Song Contest José Poiares, singer-songwriter Tozé Brito, and music producers Fernando Martins and Ramón Galarza selected thirty entries for an online vote from 420 submissions received, which were revealed on 20 January 2010. Among the competing artists was former Eurovision Song Contest entrant Nucha, who represented Portugal in the 1990 contest. On 22 January 2010, "Luta assim não dá", written by Vasco Duarte and Jel and to have been performed by Homens da Luta, was disqualified from the competition due to the song having been performed prior to the competition.

90-second excerpts of the twenty-nine competing entries were released online via rtp.pt on 20 January 2010 and users were able to vote for their favourite songs each day between 21 and 27 January 2010. 42,998 valid votes were received at the conclusion of the voting period and the top twenty-four entries that advanced to the semi-finals were revealed on 28 January 2010. Following the online vote, the semi-finalists worked with music producers Fernando Martins and Ramón Galarza on the final versions of their entries.

Results of the online vote – 21–27 January 2010
R/O	Artist	Song	Songwriter(s)	Votes	Place
1	Nina Pinto	"Meu coração não é meu"	Marios Gligoris, Augusto Madureira	2,385	3
2	Nucha	"Chuva"	Marios Gligoris, Nuno Valério	2,361	4
3	Jorge Guerreiro	"Ai Lisboa (meu encanto)"	José Félix, Catarina Martins	1,276	15
4	Banda Trocopasso	"O mundo de pernas p'ro ar"	Jorge Oliveira	2,130	5
5	Terra D'Água	"Amanhã no mar"	Davide Zaccariahá, Tiago Espírito Santo	1,161	21
6	Seis Po' Meia Dúzia	"Pássaro saudade"	Ricardo Rodrigues, Irene Lúcia Andrade	1,701	10
7	Nuno and Fábia	"Amar (vieste para me salvar)"	Pedro Britohá, Pedro Vaz	2,905	2
8	Filipa Azevedo	"Há dias assim"	Augusto Madureira	2,992	1
9	David Navarro	"Quem é que será?"	J. M., Jorge Moreira, Jorge do Carmo, Tó Andrade	1,233	16
10	Dennisa	"Meu mundo de sonhos"	Rui Barreto, João Sanguinheira, João Novo	1,219	19
11	Paulo João Sousa	"Pintado a carvão"	Paulo João Sousa	411	27
12	Nuno Pinto	"Fogo lento"	Américo Faria	1,345	13
13	Ricardo Levi	"Minha alma lusitana"	Nuno Pires, Tó Andrade	268	29
14	Filipe Delgado	"Serei eu"	Ernesto Leite	1,474	11
15	Rui Nova	"Uma canção à Cid (o sol e as estrelas)"	Rui Nova, Noé Gavina	1,226	17
16	Filipa Galvão Telles	"O amor não sabe"	José Campos Sousa, António Tinoco	2,119	6
17	Ricardo Martins	"Caminheiro de mim"	Ricardo Martins	1,143	23
18	João Pedreira	"Destino qualquer"	João Pedreira	951	26
19	Gonçalo Tavares	"Rios"	Gonçalo Tavares	1,380	12
20	Gonçalo Madruga	"Cores de um mundo"	Gonçalo Madruga	1,225	18
21	V-Boy	"Quando eu penso em ti"	Mauro Guerreiro, Vítor dos Santos	1,156	22
22	Vanessa	"Alvorada"	Nuno Feist, Nuno Marques da Silva	1,142	24
23	Ouro	"Arco-íris dentro de mim"	José Castanheira, Jan van Dijck, Paulo Abreu de Lima	1,336	14
24	Evelyne Filipe	"A tua voz"	Joachim Vermeulen Windsant, Maarten ten Hove, Evelyne Filipe	1,834	9
25	Catarina Pereira	"Canta por mim"	Andrej Babić, Carlos Coelho	2,036	7
26	Claudisabel	"Contra tudo e todos"	Jordi Cubino, Luis André Florindo	1,975	8
27	The Agency	"É assim que as coisas são"	The Agency	1,178	20
28	Davi Duarte	"Serei alguém p'ra ti"	Davi Duarte	311	28
29	Joana Lobo Anta	"Há dias"	Rita Vasconcellos, Ana Zanatti	1,125	25

==== Semi-finals ====
The two semi-finals took place on 2 and 4 March 2010. In each semi-final twelve entries competed and six advanced to the final based solely on a public televote. In addition to the performances of the competing entries, Batoto Yeto, 12 Macacos and Jukebox Project performed as the interval acts in the first semi-final, while St. Dominic's Gospel Choir, Raquel Ferreira, Teresa Radamanto, Portuguese Eurovision 1980 and 1998 entrant José Cid and member of Portuguese Eurovision 2005 entrant 2B Rui Drumond performed as the interval acts in the second semi-final.

Semi-final 1 – 2 March 2010
R/O	Artist	Song	Televote	Place
1	Nucha	"Chuva"	278	12
2	Ouro	"Arco-íris dentro de mim"	757	7
3	Claudisabel	"Contra tudo e todos"	316	10
4	Filipa Azevedo	"Há dias assim"	1,472	4
5	Jorge Guerreiro	"Ai Lisboa (meu encanto)"	794	6
6	Dennisa	"Meu mundo de sonhos"	699	8
7	Nuno Pinto	"Fogo lento"	2,080	1
8	Filipa Galvão Telles	"O amor não sabe"	1,194	5
9	The Agency	"É assim que as coisas são"	1,614	3
10	Gonçalo Madruga	"Cores de um mundo"	290	11
11	Evelyne Filipe	"A tua voz"	527	9
12	Vanessa	"Alvorada"	1,635	2

Semi-final 2 – 4 March 2010
R/O	Artist	Song	Televote	Place
1	Rui Nova	"Uma canção à Cid (o sol e as estrelas)"	1,689	6
2	Ricardo Martins	"Caminheiro de mim"	4,226	2
3	Nuno and Fábia	"Amar (vieste para me salvar)"	854	9
4	David Navarro	"Quem é que será?"	835	10
5	Catarina Pereira	"Canta por mim"	4,614	1
6	Filipe Delgado	"Serei eu"	946	8
7	V-Boy	"Quando eu penso em ti"	464	12
8	Terra D'Água	"Amanhã no mar"	828	11
9	Nina Pinto	"Meu coração não é meu"	972	7
10	Gonçalo Tavares	"Rios"	1,783	5
11	Banda Trocopasso	"O mundo de pernas p'ro ar"	3,978	3
12	Seis Po' Meia Dúzia	"Pássaro saudade"	2,689	4

==== Final ====
The final took place on 6 March 2010. The twelve entries that qualified from the two preceding semi-finals competed and the winner, "Há dias assim" performed by Filipa Azevedo, was selected based on the 50/50 combination of votes of twenty regional juries and a public televote. Voca People, Portuguese Eurovision 1973 entrant Fernando Tordo and Portuguese Eurovision 2009 entrants Flor-de-Lis performed as the interval acts.

Final – 6 March 2010
R/O	Artist	Song	Jury		Televote		Total	Place
R/O	Artist	Song	Votes	Points	Votes	Points	Total	Place
1	Filipa Galvão Telles	"O amor não sabe"	38	0	1,238	0	0	12
2	Banda Trocopasso	"O mundo de pernas p'ro ar"	93	5	4,608	8	13	4
3	Jorge Guerreiro	"Ai Lisboa (meu encanto)"	50	1	794	0	1	10
4	Ricardo Martins	"Caminheiro de mim"	61	2	8,167	10	12	7
5	The Agency	"É assim que as coisas são"	137	10	1,850	2	12	5
6	Seis Po' Meia Dúzia	"Pássaro saudade"	88	3	2,282	4	7	8
7	Nuno Pinto	"Fogo lento"	130	7	2,539	5	12	6
8	Catarina Pereira	"Canta por mim"	128	6	10,920	12	18	2
9	Filipa Azevedo	"Há dias assim"	193	12	3,237	7	19	1
10	Gonçalo Tavares	"Rios"	89	4	2,278	3	7	9
11	Vanessa	"Alvorada"	130	8	3,182	6	14	3
12	Rui Nova	"Uma canção à Cid (o sol e as estrelas)"	23	0	1,673	1	1	11

Detailed Regional Jury Votes
R/O	Song	Aveiro	Beja	Braga	Bragança	Castelo Branco	Coimbra	Évora	Faro	Madeira	Guarda	Leiria	Lisbon	Azores	Portalegre	Porto	Santarém	Setúbal	Viana do Castelo	Vila Real	Viseu	Total score
1	"O amor não sabe"	5	1	4			1	1			1		4	4	2		7	1	5	2		38
2	"O mundo de pernas p'ro ar"	12	7		2	6	7		3	5		5	2	8	5	4	12	2	3	4	6	93
3	"Ai Lisboa (meu encanto)"	4		1	8	5	3	4	7	2		4			3				6	1	2	50
4	"Caminheiro de mim"	3	2	6	1	1	4	8	2	3	8	2	5	1	4	3	1	4			3	61
5	"É assim que as coisas são"	5	8	7		3	5	10		1	12	8	8	12	10	7	10	7	7	8	8	137
6	"Pássaro saudade"	1	6	5	4			7	5	8	6	6	7	2		2	6	5	1	5	12	88
7	"Fogo lento"	8	4	8	5	4		12	10	10	7	7	3	7	6	10	5	3	10	6	5	130
8	"Canta por mim"	7	3		12	8	12	3	12	7	4	1	6		7	8	8	12	2	12	4	128
9	"Há dias assim"	10	12	12	10	10	10	5	8	12	10	12	10	10	12	12	2	8	8	10	10	193
10	"Rios"	2	5	10	7	7	6	6	1	4	2	3	1	5	1	5	4	6	4	3	7	89
11	"Alvorada"		10	2	6	12	8	2	6	6	3	10	12	6	8	6	3	10	12	7	1	130
12	"Uma canção à Cid (o sol e as estrelas)"			3	3	2	2		4		5			3		1						23

=== Controversy ===
The outcome of Festival da Canção 2010 caused much controversy as the public televote winner, Catarina Pereira, only placed second due to the jury only placing her fifth. The announcement of Filipa Azevedo's victory during the competition were met with booing from the audience, with several petitions (one of them which received over 2,000 signatures) being later created in favour of Pereira's Eurovision participation. Criticism was also made towards RTP's selection of the composition of the regional juries, including revelations that the jury members, some of them which were not music professionals, were affiliated with several of the finalists (a former professor of Azevedo was part of the Porto jury that awarded her top marks) in opposition to the competition rules. RTP subsequently released a statement indicating that no competition rules had been violated and that Azevedo would represent Portugal at the 2010 contest.

== Song ==
"Há dias assim"

Single by Filipa Azevedo
- Language: Portuguese
- Released: 2010
- Recorded: 2010
- Genre: Sentimental ballad
- Length: 2:57
- Songwriter: Augusto Madureira

"Há dias assim" (Portuguese pronunciation: [a ˈdiɐz ɐˈsĩ], translation:There are days like this, English title: It's One of Those Days) is the Portuguese entry to the Eurovision Song Contest 2010, performed by Portuguese singer Filipa Azevedo. The song was written by Augusto Madureira.

Lyrically, Azevedo sings about the separation of a lover from her, though it is unclear how they were separated, whether by conflict ("There are no words left, because we silenced them so much") or by the death of her lover ("Who took you from me, tore our lives"). She laments that this was destined to happen eventually ("Who put us on this path?"), and tells her lover to realise "that there is only one life and no way back".

== At Eurovision ==
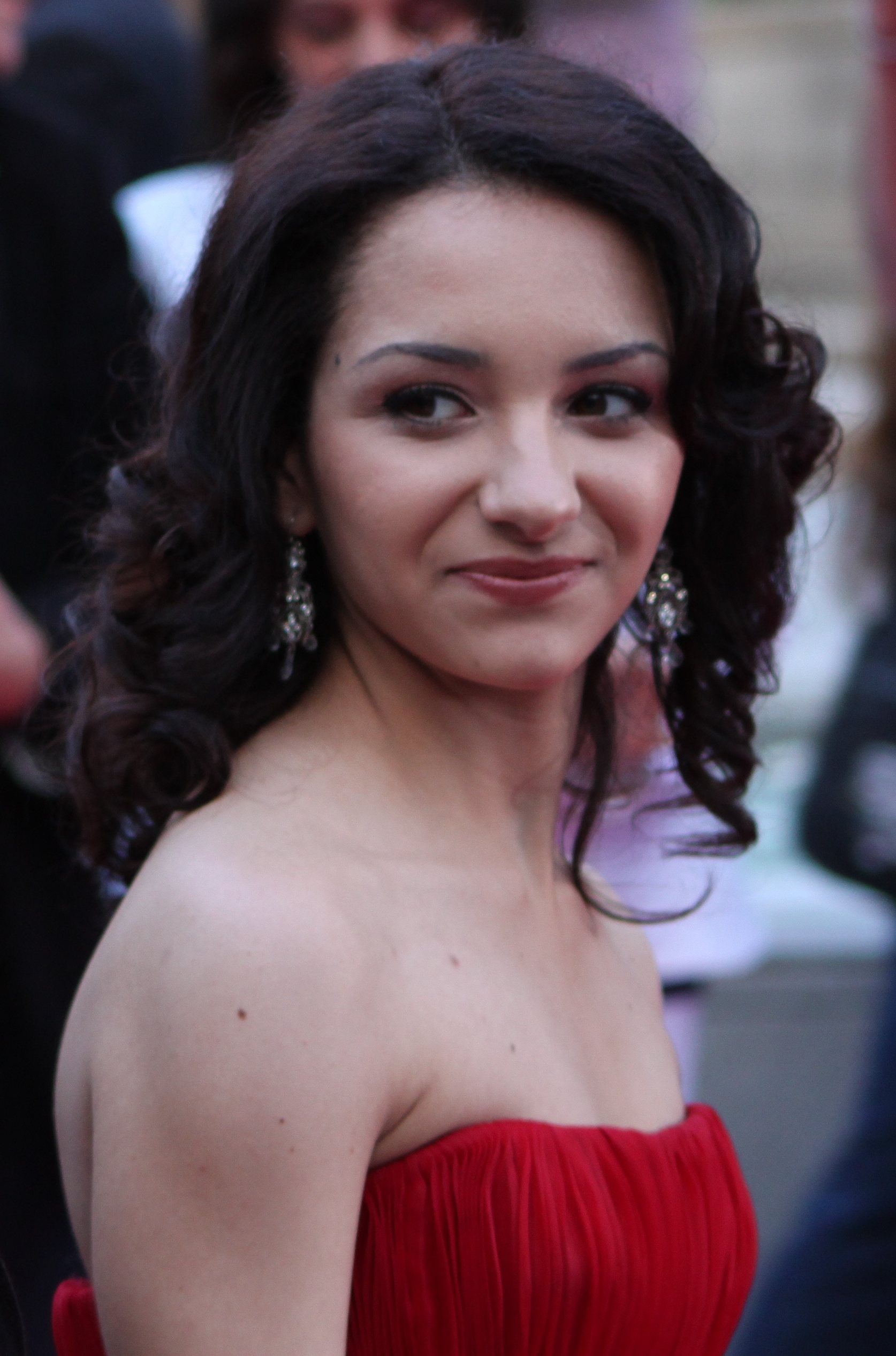
Filipa Azevedo at the Eurovision Opening Party in Oslo

According to Eurovision rules, all nations with the exceptions of the host country and the "Big Four" (France, Germany, Spain and the United Kingdom) are required to qualify from one of two semi-finals in order to compete for the final; the top ten countries from each semi-final progress to the final. The European Broadcasting Union (EBU) split up the competing countries into six different pots based on voting patterns from previous contests, with countries with favourable voting histories put into the same pot. On 7 February 2010, a special allocation draw was held which placed each country into one of the two semi-finals, as well as which half of the show they would perform in. Portugal was placed into the first semi-final, to be held on 25 May 2010, and was scheduled to perform in the second half of the show. The running order for the semi-finals was decided through another draw on 23 March 2010 and Portugal was set to perform in position 14, following the entry from Greece and before the entry from Macedonia.

In Portugal, the three shows were broadcast on RTP1, RTP1 HD and RTP Internacional with commentary by Sérgio Mateus. The first semi-final and the final were broadcast live, while the second semi-final was broadcast on delay. The Portuguese spokesperson, who announced the Portuguese votes during the final, was Ana Galvão.

=== Semi-final ===
Filipa Azevedo took part in technical rehearsals on 17 and 21 May, followed by dress rehearsals on 24 and 25 May. This included the jury final where professional juries of each country watched and voted on the competing entries.

The Portuguese performance featured Filipa Azevedo wearing a white dress with a black belt and black bracelet on her arm performing with three backing vocalists were lined up on Azevedo's left side dressed in white and black: Patrícia Antunes, Patricia Silveira and Pedro Mimoso, and a pianist on the singer's right side whose piano had a large lit candle on it: the composer of "Há dias assim" Augusto Madureira. The stage backdrop displayed white, pink and purple colours which transition to sky blue at the end of the performance, with long chains of light bulbs draping from the ceiling to the stage floor.

At the end of the show, Portugal was announced as having finished in the top 10 and subsequently qualifying for the grand final. It was later revealed that Portugal placed fourth in the semi-final, receiving a total of 89 points.

=== Final ===
Shortly after the first semi-final, a winners' press conference was held for the ten qualifying countries. As part of this press conference, the qualifying artists took part in a draw to determine the running order for the final. This draw was done in the order the countries were announced during the semi-final. Portugal was drawn to perform in position 23, following the entry from Germany and before the entry from Israel.

Filipa Azevedo once again took part in dress rehearsals on 28 and 29 May before the final, including the jury final where the professional juries cast their final votes before the live show. Filipa Azevedo performed a repeat of her semi-final performance during the final on 29 May. Portugal placed eighteenth in the final, scoring 43 points.

=== Voting ===
Voting during the three shows involved each country awarding points from 1–8, 10 and 12 as determined by a combination of 50% national jury and 50% televoting. Each nation's jury consisted of five music industry professionals who are citizens of the country they represent. This jury judged each entry based on: vocal capacity; the stage performance; the song's composition and originality; and the overall impression by the act. In addition, no member of a national jury was permitted to be related in any way to any of the competing acts in such a way that they cannot vote impartially and independently.

Following the release of the full split voting by the EBU after the conclusion of the competition, it was revealed that Portugal had placed twentieth with the public televote and thirteenth with the jury vote in the final. In the public vote, Portugal scored 24 points, while with the jury vote, Portugal scored 69 points. In the first semi-final, Portugal placed ninth with the public televote with 58 points and second with the jury vote, scoring 107 points.

Below is a breakdown of points awarded to Portugal and awarded by Portugal in the first semi-final and grand final of the contest. The nation awarded its 12 points to Belgium in the semi-final and to Spain in the final of the contest.

==== Points awarded to Portugal ====
Points awarded to Portugal (Semi- final 1)
Score	Country
12 points	Spain
10 points	Germany
8 points	France
7 points	Iceland; Latvia
6 points	Finland
5 points	Albania; Estonia; Moldova; Serbia
4 points	Belgium; Malta; Slovakia
3 points	Bosnia and Herzegovina
2 points	Macedonia; Poland
1 point	

Points awarded to Portugal (Final)
Score	Country
12 points	
10 points	
8 points	France
7 points	
6 points	Germany; Latvia; Spain
5 points	Switzerland
4 points	Armenia; Denmark
3 points	
2 points	Serbia
1 point	Iceland; Malta

==== Points awarded by Portugal ====
Points awarded by Portugal (Semi-final 1)
Score	Country
12 points	Belgium
10 points	Greece
8 points	Moldova
7 points	Belarus
6 points	Iceland
5 points	Slovakia
4 points	Estonia
3 points	Malta
2 points	Serbia
1 point	Russia

Points awarded by Portugal (Final)
Score	Country
12 points	Spain
10 points	Romania
8 points	Greece
7 points	France
6 points	Moldova
5 points	Belgium
4 points	Denmark
3 points	Norway
2 points	Russia
1 point	Germany
