= Slovenia in the Eurovision Song Contest 2010 =

- Eurovision Song Contest 2010
- Participating broadcaster: Radiotelevizija Slovenija (RTVSLO)
- Country: Slovenia
- Selection process: Evrovizijska Melodija 2010
- Selection date: 21 February 2010

Competing entry
- Song: "Narodnozabavni rock"
- Artist: Ansambel Žlindra and Kalamari
- Songwriters: Marino Legovič; Leon Oblak

Placement
- Semi-final result: Failed to qualify (16th)

Participation chronology

Slovenia was represented at the Eurovision Song Contest 2010 with the song "Narodnozabavni rock", written by Marino Legovič and Leon Oblak, and performed by the bands Ansambel Žlindra and Kalamari. The Slovene participating broadcaster, Radiotelevizija Slovenija (RTVSLO), organised the national final Evrovizijska Melodija 2010 in order to select its entry for the contest. 21 entries competed in the national final which consisted of two shows: a semi-final and a final. Fourteen of the entries competed in the semi-final and the top seven entries were selected to advance alongside seven pre-qualified songs based on a public televote. Fourteen entries qualified to compete in the final where "Narodnozabavni rock" performed by Ansambel Žlindra and Kalamari was selected as the winner entirely by a public televote.

Slovenia was drawn to compete in the second semi-final of the Eurovision Song Contest which took place on 27 May 2010. Performing during the show in position 11, "Narodnozabavni rock" was not announced among the top 10 entries of the second semi-final and therefore did not qualify to compete in the final. It was later revealed that Slovenia placed sixteenth out of the 17 participating countries in the semi-final with 6 points.

== Background ==
Prior to the 2010 contest, Radiotelevizija Slovenija (RTVSLO) had participated in the Eurovision Song Contest representing Slovenia fifteen times since its first entry in 1993. Its highest placing in the contest, to this point, has been seventh place, achieved on two occasions: in 1995 with the song "Prisluhni mi" performed by Darja Švajger and in 2001 with the song "Energy" performed by Nuša Derenda. The country's only other top ten result was achieved in 1997 when Tanja Ribič performing "Zbudi se" placed tenth. Since the introduction of semi-finals to the format of the contest in 2004, Slovenia had thus far only managed to qualify to the final on one occasion. In 2009, "Love Symphony" performed by Quartissimo feat. Martina failed to qualify to the final.

As part of its duties as participating broadcaster, RTVSLO organises the selection of its entry in the Eurovision Song Contest and broadcasts the event in the country. The broadcaster confirmed its participation in the 2010 contest on 18 October 2009. RTVSLO has traditionally selected its entry through a national final entitled Evrovizijska Melodija (EMA), which has been produced with variable formats. For 2010, the broadcaster opted to organise Evrovizijska Melodija 2010 (EMA 2010) to select its entry.

== Before Eurovision ==
=== EMA 2010 ===
The logo of EMA 2010

EMA 2010 was the 15th edition of the Slovenian national final format Evrovizijska Melodija (EMA). The competition was used by RTV Slovenija to select Slovenia's entry for the Eurovision Song Contest 2010, and consisted of two shows that took place on 20 and 21 February 2010. Both shows of the competition took place at the Gospodarsko razstavišče in Ljubljana and were broadcast on TV SLO 1 and online via the broadcaster's website rtvslo.si.

==== Format ====
The format of the competition consisted of two televised shows: a semi-final held on 20 February 2010 and a final held on 21 February 2010. Fourteen songs competed in the semi-final and public televoting exclusively determined seven finalists to proceed to the final alongside an additional seven pre-qualified finalists. Fourteen songs competed in the final where public televoting exclusively determined the winner.

==== Competing entries ====
Artists and composers were able to submit their entries to the broadcaster between 17 October 2009 and 14 December 2009. All songs were required to be submitted in Slovene due to certain legal restrictions made on RTV Slovenija to promote the language. 111 entries were received by the broadcaster during the submission period. An expert committee consisting of Mojca Menart (Head of ZKP RTV Slovenija), Urška Čop (music editor for Radio Maribor), Andrea Flego (radio host, musician and producer), Miha Vardjan (arranger and songwriter) and Drago Mislej Mef (musician and songwriter) selected fourteen artists and songs for the semi-final of the competition from the received submissions, while the seven pre-qualifying songs for the final were written by composers nominated by an alternate committee consisting of Eurovision and music experts and directly invited by the broadcaster for the competition: Gal Gjurin, Marino Legovič, Miran Juvan, Neisha, Patrik Greblo, Raay and Zvone Tomac. The composers also selected the performer for their entry. The competing artists in the semi-final and final were announced on 18 December 2009 and 8 January 2010, respectively. Among the competing artists was former Slovenian Eurovision contestant Nuša Derenda who represented Slovenia in 2001.

Artist	Song	Songwriter(s)	Selection
Anastazija Juvan	"Nežna"	Miran Juvan, Anastazija Juvan	Invited by RTVSLO
Ansambel Roka Žlindre and Kalamari	"Narodnozabavni rock"	Marino Legovič, Leon Oblak	Open submission
Brigita Šuler	"Para me"	Miha Hercog, Saša Lendero	Open submission
Hamo and Gal	"Črni konji čez nebo"	Gal Gjurin	Invited by RTVSLO
Langa	"Roko mi daj"	Miha Hercog, Mišo Kontrec, Saša Lendero	Open submission
Lea Sirk	"Vampir je moj poet"	Patrik Greblo, Juliette Justine	Invited by RTVSLO
Manca Špik	"Tukaj sem doma"	Andrej Babić, Feri Lainšček	Open submission
Marko Vozelj	"Moj si zrak"	Marko Vozelj	Open submission
Martina Feri and Tomaž Nedoh	"Le en dan"	Tom Nedoh, Nik Papič, Polona Oblak	Open submission
Martina Šraj	"Dovolj ljubezni"	Simon Skalar, Martina Šraj	Open submission
Nina Pušlar	"Dež"	Martin Štibernik, Dejan Radičevič	Open submission
Nuša Derenda	"Sanjajva"	Neisha	Invited by RTVSLO
Petra Pečovnik	"Iz navade"	Domen Kumer, Petra Pečovnik	Open submission
Sara Kobold	"Od tod do večnosti"	Martin Štibernik	Open submission
Saša Zamernik	"Živim za zdaj"	Raay, Dantaya	Open submission
Stereotipi	"Daj mi en znak"	Zvone Tomac, Janez Rupnik, Vatroslav Tomac	Invited by RTVSLO
Tangels	"Kaj in kam"	Raay, P. Charles	Invited by RTVSLO
Vaso and D Plejbeks	"Gremo na Emo"	Tadej Vasle	Open submission
Vlado Pilja	"Tudi fantje jočejo"	Marino Legovič, Igor Pirkovič	Invited by RTVSLO
Ylenia Zobec	"Priznam"	Tadej Mihelič, Ylenia Zobec	Open submission
Zadnji taxi	"Franjo"	Roman Zupančič	Open submission

==== Semi-final ====
The semi-final of EMA 2010 took place on 20 February 2010, hosted by Ivo Kores and Bernarda Žarn. In addition to the performances of the competing entries, Natalija Verboten, Eva Černe, 2008 Slovenian Eurovision entrant Rebeka Dremelj and 2009 Bosnian Eurovision entrant Regina performed as guests. A public televote selected seven entries to proceed to the final.

Semi-final – 20 February 2010
R/O	Artist	Song	Televote	Place
1	Sara Kobold	"Od tod do večnosti"	549	8
2	Brigita Šuler	"Para me"	618	7
3	Nina Pušlar	"Dež"	966	4
4	Langa	"Roko mi daj"	2,034	2
5	Saša Zamernik	"Živim za zdaj"	454	11
6	Ylenia Zobec	"Priznam"	477	10
7	Vaso and D Plejbeks	"Gremo na Emo"	208	13
8	Martina Šraj	"Dovolj ljubezni"	773	6
9	Marko Vozelj	"Moj si zrak"	924	5
10	Petra Pečovnik	"Iz navade"	179	14
11	Martina Feri and Tomaž Nedoh	"Le en dan"	275	12
12	Zadnji taxi	"Franjo"	515	9
13	Manca Špik	"Tukaj sem doma"	1,446	3
14	Ansambel Roka Žlindre and Kalamari	"Narodnozabavni rock"	6,745	1

==== Final ====
The final of EMA 2010 took place on 21 February 2010, hosted by Lorella and Andrea Flego. The seven entries that qualified from the semi-final alongside the seven pre-qualified entries competed. In addition to the performances of the competing entries, Saša Lendero, Tinkara Kovač, 2005 Slovenian Eurovision entrant Omar Naber, 2009 Slovenian Eurovision entrant Quartissimo and 2009 Eurovision winner Alexander Rybak performed as guests. A public televote selected "Narodnozabavni rock" performed by Ansambel Roka Žlindre and Kalamari as the winner.

Final – 21 February 2010
R/O	Artist	Song	Televote	Place
1	Marko Vozelj	"Moj si zrak"	1,597	6
2	Nuša Derenda	"Sanjajva"	1,040	9
3	Langa	"Roko mi daj"	3,462	3
4	Tangels	"Kaj in kam"	444	12
5	Brigita Šuler	"Para me"	1,244	8
6	Anastazija Juvan	"Nežna"	273	14
7	Manca Špik	"Tukaj sem doma"	2,264	4
8	Hamo and Gal	"Črni konji čez nebo"	1,918	5
9	Martina Šraj	"Dovolj ljubezni"	1,479	7
10	Stereotipi	"Daj mi en znak"	298	13
11	Nina Pušlar	"Dež"	3,527	2
12	Vlado Pilja	"Tudi fantje jočejo"	513	11
13	Ansambel Roka Žlindre and Kalamari	"Narodnozabavni rock"	15,907	1
14	Lea Sirk	"Vampir je moj poet"	751	10

==== Ratings ====
Viewing figures by show
Show	Air date	Viewing figures		Ref.
Show	Air date	Nominal	Share	Ref.
Semi-final	20 February 2010	193,000	10.5%	
Final	21 February 2010	328,000	17.8%	

=== Promotion ===
Ansambel Žlindra and Kalamari specifically promote "Narodnozabavni rock" as the Slovenian Eurovision entry on 24 April 2010 by performing during the Eurovision in Concert event which was held at the Lexion venue in Zaanstad, Netherlands and hosted by Cornald Maas and Marga Bult.

== At Eurovision ==
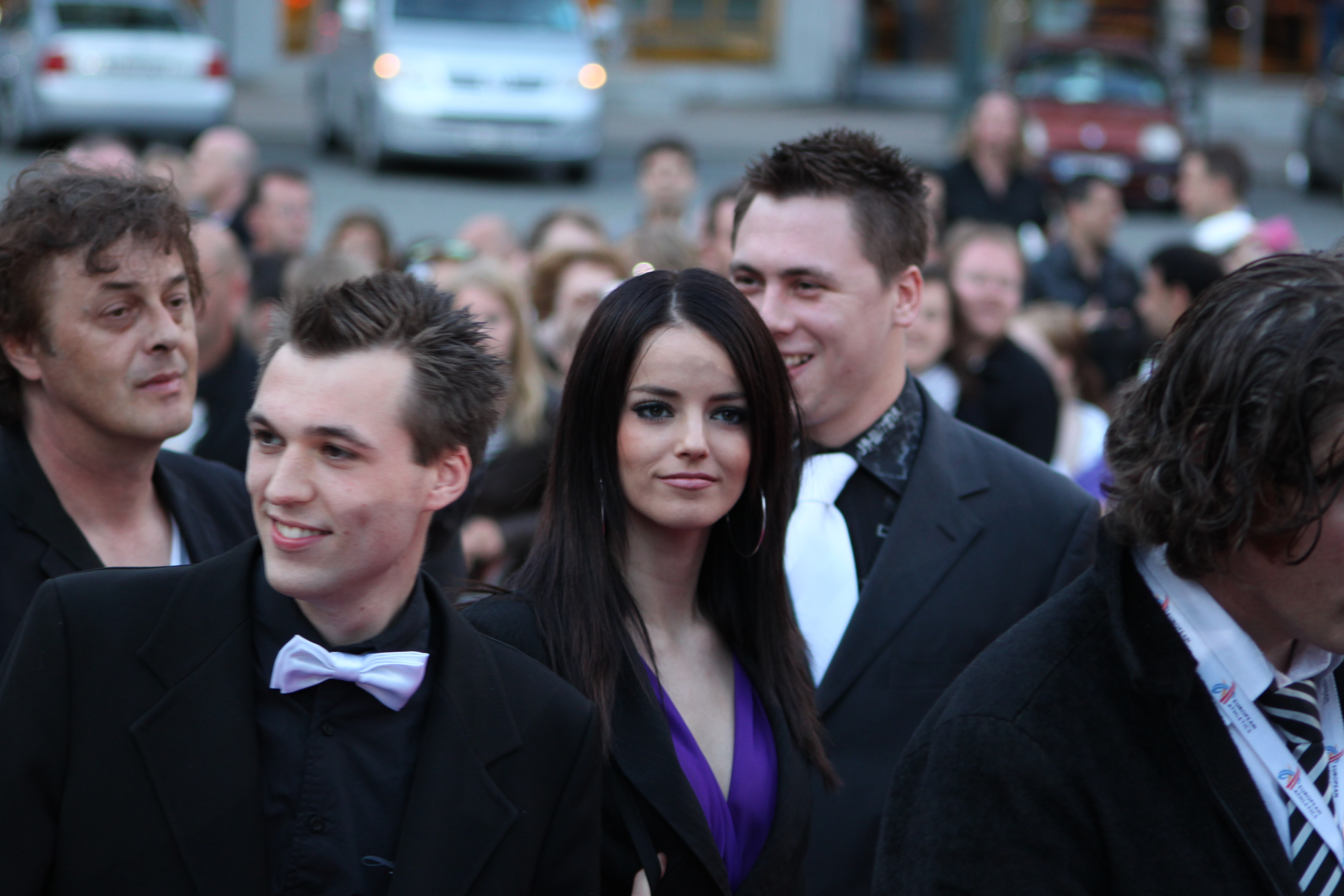
Ansambel Žlindra and Kalamari at the Eurovision Opening Party in Oslo

According to Eurovision rules, all nations with the exceptions of the host country and the "Big Four" (France, Germany, Spain and the United Kingdom) are required to qualify from one of two semi-finals in order to compete for the final; the top ten countries from each semi-final progress to the final. The European Broadcasting Union (EBU) split up the competing countries into six different pots based on voting patterns from previous contests, with countries with favourable voting histories put into the same pot. On 7 February 2010, an allocation draw was held which placed each country into one of the two semi-finals, as well as which half of the show they would perform in. Slovenia was placed into the second semi-final, to be held on 27 May 2010, and was scheduled to perform in the second half of the show. The running order for the semi-finals was decided through another draw on 23 March 2010 and Slovenia was set to perform in position 11, following the entry from Romania and before the entry from Ireland.

In Slovenia, the semi-finals were televised on TV SLO 2 and the final was televised on TV SLO 1. Both shows featured commentary by Andrej Hofer. The Slovenian spokesperson, who announced the Slovenian votes during the final, was Andrea F.

=== Semi-final ===
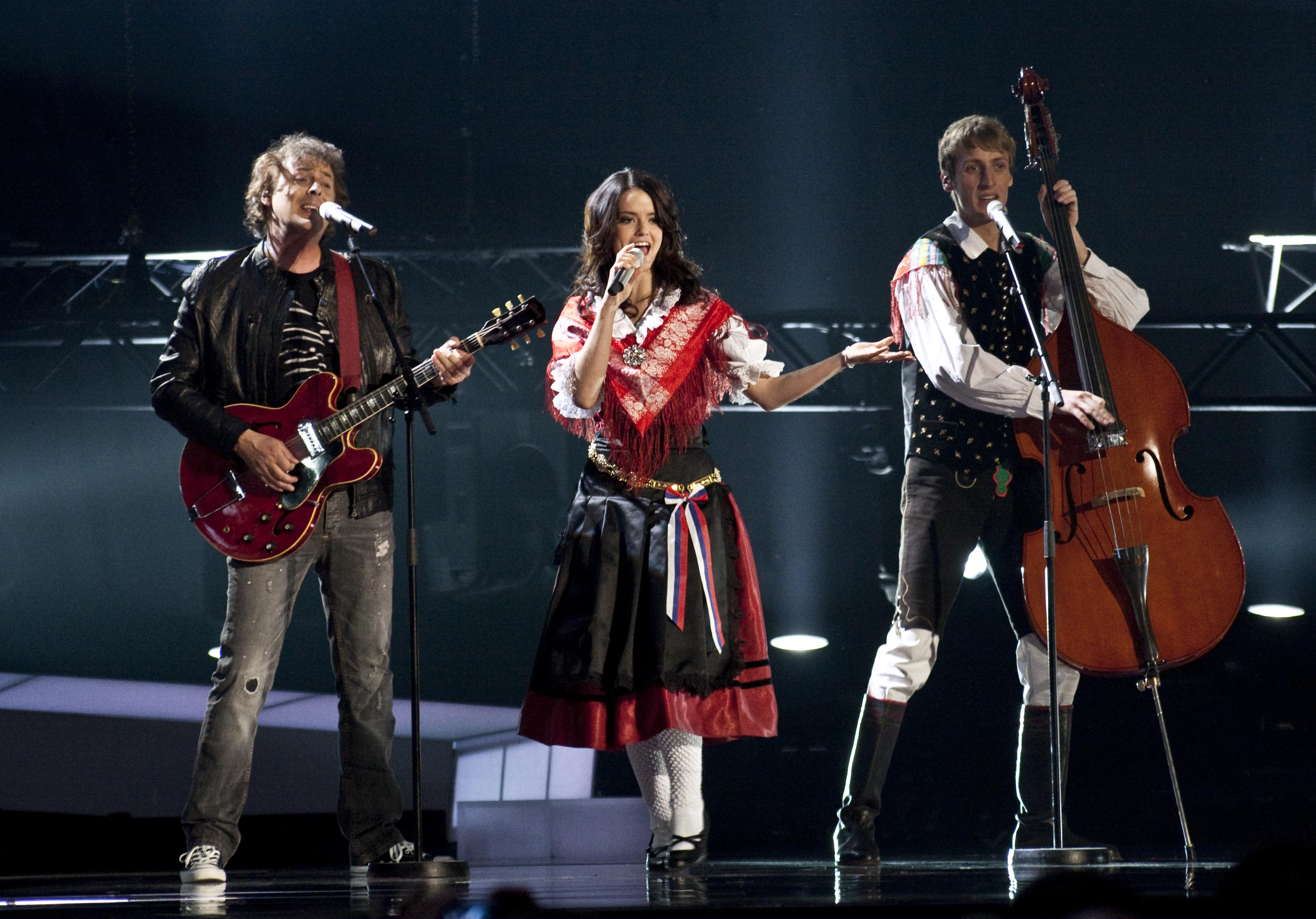
Ansambel Žlindra and Kalamari during a rehearsal before the second semi-final

Ansambel Žlindra and Kalamari took in technical rehearsals on 19 and 22 May, followed by dress rehearsals on 26 and 27 May. This included the jury show on 26 May where the professional juries of each country watched and voted on the competing entries.

The Slovenian performance featured the members of Ansambel Žlindra performing in black, white and red traditional folk costumes and the members of Kalamari performing in casual clothes, jeans and t-shirts. The performance also featured interactions between the two lead vocalists of Ansambel Žlindra and Kalamari who both hid behind the other members at the beginning and jumping out as the music began. The stage backdrop was dark and the lights varied from white to red as the song progressed.

At the end of the show, Slovenia was not announced among the top 10 entries in the second semi-final and therefore failed to qualify to compete in the final. It was later revealed that Slovenia placed sixteenth in the semi-final, receiving a total of 6 points.

=== Voting ===
Voting during the three shows involved each country awarding points from 1-8, 10 and 12 as determined by a combination of 50% national jury and 50% televoting. Each nation's jury consisted of five music industry professionals who are citizens of the country they represent. This jury judged each entry based on: vocal capacity; the stage performance; the song's composition and originality; and the overall impression by the act. In addition, no member of a national jury was permitted to be related in any way to any of the competing acts in such a way that they cannot vote impartially and independently. The members that comprised the Slovenian jury were: Urša Vlašič (lyricist, writer of the 1998, 2005 and 2006 Slovene contest entries), Sandra Feketija (singer), Miroslav Akrapovič (music editor and critic), Matjaž Bogataj (violinist, represented Slovenia in the 2009 contest as part of the group Quartissimo) and Dušan Hren (director).

Below is a breakdown of points awarded to Slovenia and awarded by Slovenia in the second semi-final and grand final of the contest. The nation awarded its 12 points to Croatia in the semi-final and to Denmark in the final of the contest.

==== Points awarded to Slovenia ====
Points awarded to Slovenia (Semi-final 2)
Score	Country
12 points	
10 points	
8 points	
7 points	
6 points	
5 points	Croatia
4 points	
3 points	
2 points	
1 point	Israel

==== Points awarded by Slovenia ====
Points awarded by Slovenia (Semi-final 2)
Score	Country
12 points	Croatia
10 points	Denmark
8 points	Azerbaijan
7 points	Georgia
6 points	Netherlands
5 points	Israel
4 points	Romania
3 points	Turkey
2 points	Ireland
1 point	Ukraine

Points awarded by Slovenia (Final)
Score	Country
12 points	Denmark
10 points	Germany
8 points	Serbia
7 points	Romania
6 points	Israel
5 points	Spain
4 points	Bosnia and Herzegovina
3 points	France
2 points	Turkey
1 point	Georgia
