= Bosnia and Herzegovina in the Eurovision Song Contest 2009 =

- Eurovision Song Contest 2009
- Participating broadcaster: Radio and Television of Bosnia and Herzegovina (BHRT)
- Country: Bosnia and Herzegovina
- Selection process: Internal selection
- Announcement date: Artist: 12 January 2009; Song: 1 March 2009

Competing entry
- Song: "Bistra voda"
- Artist: Regina
- Songwriters: Aleksandar Čović

Placement
- Semi-final result: Qualified (3rd, 125 points)
- Final result: 9th, 106 points

Participation chronology

Bosnia and Herzegovina was represented at the Eurovision Song Contest 2009 with the song "Bistra voda" (in English "Clear water"), written by Aleksandar Čović, and performed by the band Regina. The Bosnian-Herzegovinian participating broadcaster, Radio and Television of Bosnia and Herzegovina (BHRT), revealed on 12 January 2009 that it had internally selected Regina to compete at the 2009 contest. Their song, "Bistra voda", was presented to the public during a show entitled BH Eurosong Show 2009 on 1 March 2009.

Bosnia and Herzegovina was drawn to compete in the first semi-final of the Eurovision Song Contest which took place on 12 May 2009. Performing as the closing entry during the show in position 18, "Bistra voda" was announced among the 10 qualifying entries of the first semi-final and therefore qualified to compete in the final on 16 May. It was later revealed that Bosnia and Herzegovina placed third out of the 18 participating countries in the semi-final with 125 points. In the final, Bosnia and Herzegovina performed in position 12 and placed ninth out of the 25 participating countries, scoring 106 points.

== Background ==
Prior to the 2009 contest, Radio and Television of Bosnia and Herzegovina (BHRT) and its predecessor national broadcasters, had participated in the Eurovision Song Contest representing Bosnia and Herzegovina fourteen times since its first entry in 1993. Their best placing in the contest was third, which it achieved in 2006 with the song "Lejla" performed by Hari Mata Hari. Following the introduction of semi-finals for the 2004 contest, Bosnia and Herzegovina has, up to this year, managed to qualify on each occasion it participated and compete in the final. Its least successful result has been 22nd place, achieved in 1996.

As part of its duties as participating broadcaster, BHRT organises the selection of its entry in the Eurovision Song Contest and broadcasts the event in the country. The broadcaster confirmed its intentions to participate at the 2009 contest on 18 November 2008. The broadcaster had selected the Bosnian-Herzegovinian entry through an internal selection process since 2006, a selection procedure that was continued for its 2009 entry.

== Before Eurovision ==
=== Internal selection ===
On 15 November 2008, the broadcaster opened the submission period for artists and composers to submit their entries up until 20 December 2008. Artists were required to be citizens of Bosnia and Herzegovina, while songwriters could be of any nationality. 79 submissions were received at the closing of the deadline, including an entry from 2006 Bosnian Eurovision entrant Hari Mata Hari. On 12 January 2009, BHRT announced that they had internally selected the band Regina to represent Bosnia and Herzegovina in Moscow with the song "Bistra voda" which was written by band member Aleksandar Čović. Band member Davor Ebner previously attempted to represent Bosnia and Herzegovina in the Eurovision Song Contest 2001, performed together with Grunti Bugli in the national final and placing joint seventh with the song "Ko mi te uze". The seven-member selection committee that determined Regina and the song to be performed at the contest consisted of Dejan Kukrić (Bosnian Head of Delegation at the Eurovision Song Contest), Jasmin Ferović (music editor at BH Radio 1), Adnan Mušanović (music producer of MP BHRT), Goran Kovačić (musician), Miroslav Maraus (composer and arranger), Damir Imamović (musician) and Mahir Sarihodžić (producer).

"Bistra voda" was presented during a television special entitled BH Eurosong Show 2009 on 1 March 2009, which was held at the BHRT Studio A in Sarajevo and hosted by Dejan Kukrić, Maja Čengić and Aida Halilović. The show was broadcast on BHT 1 and BH Radio 1 as well as streamed online via the broadcaster's website bhrt.ba and the official Eurovision Song Contest website eurovision.tv. In addition to the presentation of the song, the show featured guest performances by 1964 Yugoslav Eurovision entrant Sabahudin Kurt, 1998, 2005 and 2009 Maltese Eurovision entrant Chiara, 2004 and 2009 Greek Eurovision entrant Sakis Rouvas, 2006 Macedonian Eurovision entrant Elena Risteska, 2008 Bosnian Eurovision entrant Laka, 2009 Macedonian Eurovision entrant Next Time, 2009 Montenegrin Eurovision entrant Andrea Demirović, 2009 Slovenian Eurovision entrants Quartissimo and Martina Majerle, 2009 Turkish Eurovision entrant Hadise and 2009 British Eurovision entrant Jade Ewen. A Bosnian language version, English language version and Russian language version of the song were prepared, with the song being performed in Bosnian at the Eurovision Song Contest.

=== Promotion ===
Regina made several appearances across Europe to specifically promote "Bistra voda" as the Bosnian Eurovision entry. The band appeared during the final of the Macedonian Eurovision national final Skopje Fest 2009 on 21 February and performed "Bistra voda" during the semi-final of the Serbian Eurovision national final Beovizija 2009 on 7 March. Between 10 and 12 April, the band performed as a special guest for 1999 Bosnian Eurovision entrant Dino Merlin's concerts that were held in Gothenburg and Malmö, Sweden as well as in Horsens, Denmark. On 18 April, Regina performed during the Eurovision in Concert event, which was held at the Amsterdam Marcanti venue in Amsterdam, Netherlands and hosted by Marga Bult and Maggie MacNeal. The band also took part in promotional activities in Albania, Croatia, Montenegro, Slovenia and Turkey which included several television and radio appearances.

== At Eurovision ==
According to Eurovision rules, all nations with the exceptions of the host country and the "Big Four" (France, Germany, Spain and the United Kingdom) are required to qualify from one of two semi-finals in order to compete for the final; the top nine songs from each semi-final as determined by televoting progress to the final, and a tenth was determined by back-up juries. The European Broadcasting Union (EBU) split up the competing countries into six different pots based on voting patterns from previous contests, with countries with favourable voting histories put into the same pot. On 30 January 2009, a special allocation draw was held which placed each country into one of the two semi-finals. Bosnia and Herzegovina was placed into the first semi-final, to be held on 12 May 2009. The running order for the semi-finals was decided through another draw on 16 March 2009 and Bosnia and Herzegovina was set to perform last in position 18, following the entry from Malta.

The two semi-finals and the final were broadcast in Bosnia and Herzegovina on BHT 1 and BH Radio 1 with commentary by Dejan Kukrić. Additionally, a public screening of the final was organized at the Children of Sarajevo Square in Sarajevo. The Bosnian spokesperson, who announced the Bosnian votes during the final, was Laka who represented Bosnia and Herzegovina in the Eurovision Song Contest 2008.

=== Semi-final ===
Regina took part in technical rehearsals on 4 and 8 May, followed by dress rehearsals on 11 and 12 May. The Bosnian performance featured the members of Regina being joined on stage by two drummers. During the climax of the song, all performers moved to the front of the stage with one of the drummers displaying a red flag in the air using a wind machine. According to the band, the performers' white costumes emphasized Russian aristocracy, while the predominantly red staging symbolised Russia and the message of "Bistra voda" being a love revolution. The creative director for the Bosnian performance was Boris Miljković. The two drummers that joined Regina were: Danijela Večerinović and Elma Selimović.

At the end of the show, Bosnia and Herzegovina was announced as having finished in the top 10 and subsequently qualifying for the grand final. It was later revealed that Bosnia and Herzegovina placed third in the semi-final, receiving a total of 125 points.

=== Final ===
Shortly after the first semi-final, a winners' press conference was held for the ten qualifying countries. As part of this press conference, the qualifying artists took part in a draw to determine the running order for the final. This draw was done in the order the countries appeared in the semi-final running order. Bosnia and Herzegovina was drawn to perform in position 12, following the entry from Azerbaijan and before the entry from Moldova.

Regina once again took part in dress rehearsals on 15 and 16 May before the final, including the jury final where the professional juries cast their final votes before the live show. The band performed a repeat of their semi-final performance during the final on 16 May. At the conclusion of the voting, Bosnia and Herzegovina finished in ninth place with 106 points.

=== Voting ===
The voting system for 2009 involved each country awarding points from 1–8, 10 and 12, with the points in the final being decided by a combination of 50% national jury and 50% televoting. Each nation's jury consisted of five music industry professionals who are citizens of the country they represent. This jury judged each entry based on: vocal capacity; the stage performance; the song's composition and originality; and the overall impression by the act. In addition, no member of a national jury was permitted to be related in any way to any of the competing acts in such a way that they cannot vote impartially and independently.

Following the release of the full split voting by the EBU after the conclusion of the competition, it was revealed that Bosnia and Herzegovina had placed seventh with the public televote and twelfth with the jury vote in the final. In the public vote, Bosnia and Herzegovina scored 124 points, while with the jury vote, Bosnia and Herzegovina scored 90 points.

Below is a breakdown of points awarded to Bosnia and Herzegovina and awarded by Bosnia and Herzegovina in the first semi-final and grand final of the contest. The nation awarded its 12 points to Turkey in the semi-final and to Croatia in the final of the contest.

==== Points awarded to Bosnia and Herzegovina ====
Points awarded to Bosnia and Herzegovina (Semi-final 1)
| Score | Country |
|---|---|
| 12 points | Montenegro; Turkey |
| 10 points | Macedonia |
| 8 points | Czech Republic; Finland; Germany; Sweden; Switzerland |
| 7 points | Bulgaria; Malta; Portugal |
| 6 points | Armenia |
| 5 points | Belarus; Belgium; Romania |
| 4 points | |
| 3 points | Iceland; Israel; United Kingdom |
| 2 points | |
| 1 point | |

Points awarded to Bosnia and Herzegovina (Final)
| Score | Country |
|---|---|
| 12 points | Croatia; Montenegro; Serbia |
| 10 points | Macedonia; Slovenia |
| 8 points | Slovakia; Turkey |
| 7 points | |
| 6 points | Finland |
| 5 points | Albania; Sweden |
| 4 points | Bulgaria; Netherlands; Switzerland |
| 3 points | |
| 2 points | Azerbaijan; Germany; Iceland |
| 1 point | |

==== Points awarded by Bosnia and Herzegovina ====
Points awarded by Bosnia and Herzegovina (Semi-final 1)
| Score | Country |
|---|---|
| 12 points | Turkey |
| 10 points | Montenegro |
| 8 points | Macedonia |
| 7 points | Iceland |
| 6 points | Romania |
| 5 points | Malta |
| 4 points | Sweden |
| 3 points | Portugal |
| 2 points | Switzerland |
| 1 point | Armenia |

Points awarded by Bosnia and Herzegovina (Final)
| Score | Country |
|---|---|
| 12 points | Croatia |
| 10 points | Norway |
| 8 points | Israel |
| 7 points | Turkey |
| 6 points | France |
| 5 points | Greece |
| 4 points | United Kingdom |
| 3 points | Azerbaijan |
| 2 points | Germany |
| 1 point | Portugal |

==== Detailed voting results ====
The following members comprised the Bosnian jury:

- Vesna Andree-Zaimović – musicologist
- Adi Mulahalilović – producer
- Maja Tatić – singer, represented Bosnia and Herzegovina in the 2002 contest
- Damir Šehanović – journalist
- Miroslav Maraus – musician

Detailed voting results from Bosnia and Herzegovina (Final)
| R/O | Country | Results | | | Points |
| R/O | Country | Jury | Televoting | Combined | Points |
|---|---|---|---|---|---|
| 01 | Lithuania | | | | |
| 02 | Israel | 12 | | 12 | 8 |
| 03 | France | 10 | | 10 | 6 |
| 04 | Sweden | 2 | | 2 | |
| 05 | Croatia | 8 | 12 | 20 | 12 |
| 06 | Portugal | 6 | | 6 | 1 |
| 07 | Iceland | | 4 | 4 | |
| 08 | Greece | | 7 | 7 | 5 |
| 09 | Armenia | 3 | | 3 | |
| 10 | Russia | | | | |
| 11 | Azerbaijan | | 6 | 6 | 3 |
| 12 | Bosnia and Herzegovina | | | | |
| 13 | Moldova | | | | |
| 14 | Malta | | | | |
| 15 | Estonia | | 3 | 3 | |
| 16 | Denmark | | | | |
| 17 | Germany | 4 | 2 | 6 | 2 |
| 18 | Turkey | 1 | 10 | 11 | 7 |
| 19 | Albania | | 5 | 5 | |
| 20 | Norway | 5 | 8 | 13 | 10 |
| 21 | Ukraine | | | | |
| 22 | Romania | | 1 | 1 | |
| 23 | United Kingdom | 7 | | 7 | 4 |
| 24 | Finland | | | | |
| 25 | Spain | | | | |
