= Netherlands in the Eurovision Song Contest 2009 =

- Eurovision Song Contest 2009
- Participating broadcaster: Nederlandse Omroep Stichting (NOS)
- Country: Netherlands
- Selection process: Artist: Internal selection Song: Nationaal Songfestival 2009
- Selection date: Artist: 19 September 2008; Song: 1 February 2009

Competing entry
- Song: "Shine"
- Artist: De Toppers
- Songwriters: Bas van den Heuvel; Gordon Heuckeroth

Placement
- Semi-final result: Failed to qualify (17th)

Participation chronology

The Netherlands was represented at the Eurovision Song Contest 2009 with the song "Shine", written by Bas van den Heuvel and Gordon Heuckeroth, and performed by the group De Toppers. The Dutch participating broadcaster, Nederlandse Omroep Stichting (NOS), announced De Toppers as its representatives on 19 September 2008, while the national final Nationaal Songfestival 2009 was organised in order to select the song. Six songs competed in the national final on 1 February 2009 where "Shine" was selected as the winning song following the combination of votes from a five-member jury panel and a public vote.

The Netherlands was drawn to compete in the first semi-final of the Eurovision Song Contest which took place on 14 May 2009. Performing as the closing entry during the show in position 19, "Shine" was not among the 10 qualifying entries of the second semi-final and therefore did not qualify to compete in the final. It was later revealed that the Netherlands placed seventeenth out of the 19 participating countries in the semi-final with 11 points.

== Background ==
Prior to the 2009 contest, Nederlandse Televisie Stichting (NTS) until 1969, and Nederlandse Omroep Stichting (NOS) since 1970, had participated in the Eurovision Song Contest representing the Netherlands forty-nine times since NTS début in 1956. They have won the contest four times: in 1957 with the song "Net als toen" performed by Corry Brokken; in 1959 with the song "'n Beetje" performed by Teddy Scholten; in 1969 as one of four countries to tie for first place with "De troubadour" performed by Lenny Kuhr; and finally in 1975 with "Ding-a-dong" performed by the group Teach-In. Following the introduction of semi-finals for the 2004 contest, the Netherlands had featured in only one final. The Dutch least successful result has been last place, which they have achieved on four occasions, most recently in 1968. The Netherlands has also received nul points on two occasions; in 1962 and in 1963.

As part of its duties as participating broadcaster, NOS organises the selection of its entry in the Eurovision Song Contest and broadcasts the event in the country. The Dutch broadcaster has used various methods to select its entry in the past, such as the Nationaal Songfestival, a live televised national final to choose the performer, song or both to compete at Eurovision. However, internal selections have also been held on occasion. Since 2007, the broadcaster has internally selected the entry. For 2009, the broadcaster opted to select the artist through an internal selection, while Nationaal Songfestival was organised to select the song.

== Before Eurovision ==
=== Artist selection ===
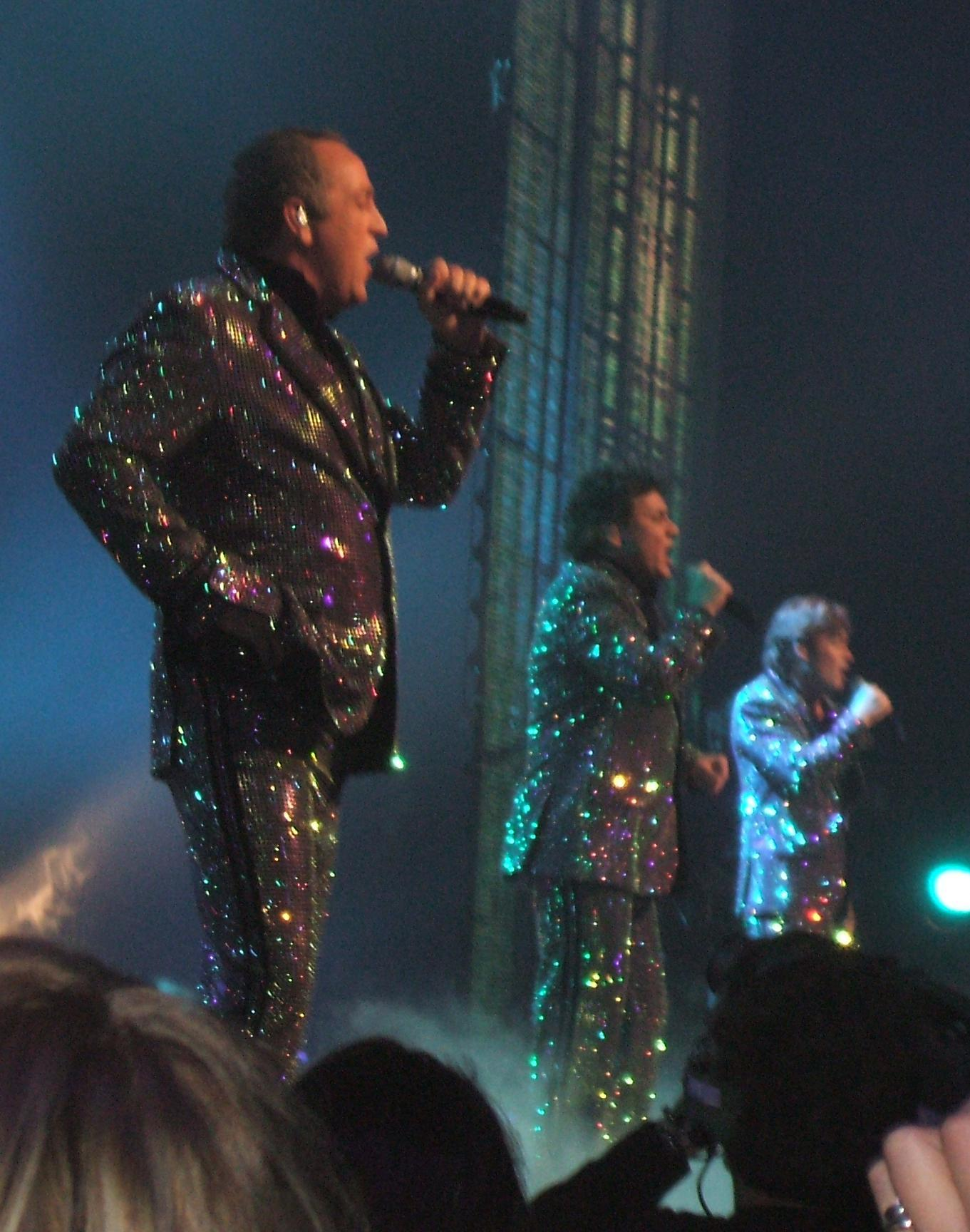
De Toppers was internally selected to represent the Netherlands in the Eurovision Song Contest 2009

Following Hind's failure to qualify to the final in 2008 with the song "Your Heart Belongs to Me", the Dutch broadcaster internally selected the artist for the Eurovision Song Contest 2009. An Internet poll conducted by Dutch social networking site Hyves in July 2008 was won by singer Anouk. On 19 September 2008, NOS announced that they had selected the group De Toppers to represent the Netherlands at the 2009 contest. Among the members of the group were Gerard Joling who previously represented the Netherlands at the Eurovision Song Contest 1988, placing ninth with the song "Shangri-La", and Gordon Heuckeroth who had previously attempted to represent the Netherlands in the Eurovision Song Contest in 2003, placing second in the national final with the song "I'll Be Your Voice". On 30 September 2008, it was revealed that their Eurovision song would be selected through the national final Nationaal Songfestival 2009.

On 5 November 2008, it was revealed that complications within Joling and Gordon as well as TROS and NOS, mainly of disagreements over the planned docusoap Op weg naar Moskou, have resulted in the Dutch participation coming under threat. De Toppers' manager Benno de Leeuw was hospitalised for a week during the incident and therefore no agreement could be made. Joling left the group on 9 November 2008, and singer Jeroen van der Boom was confirmed as the replacement member on 11 November 2008 despite reports that NOS would select another artist for the contest.

=== Nationaal Songfestival 2009 ===
A submission period was opened by the Dutch broadcaster on 30 September 2008 where composers were able to submit their songs until 23 November 2008. More than 565 submissions were received by the broadcaster at the closing of the deadline, of which 365 were complete songs. De Toppers shortlisted 20 songs before ultimately selecting six songs for the competition. The six selected competing songs were announced on 18 December 2008.

The national final took place on 1 February 2009 at the Studio 22 in Hilversum, hosted by Jack van Gelder and was broadcast on Nederland 1 as well as streamed online via the official Eurovision Song Contest website eurovision.tv. All six competing songs were performed by De Toppers and the winning song, "Shine", was selected by the combination of a public televote (2/3) and the votes of a five-member jury (1/3). The viewers had a total of 420 points to award, while the juries had a total of 210 points to award. Each juror assigned their points as follows: 2, 4, 6, 8, 10 and 12 points. The viewer vote was based on the percentage of votes each song achieved through the following voting methods: telephone and SMS voting. For example, if a song gained 10% of the vote, then that entry would be awarded 10% of 420 points rounded to the nearest integer: 42 points. The jury panel consisted of co-owner of 8Ball Music/Talpa Music Tony Berk, singer and actress Tatjana Šimić, radio DJ Daniël Dekker, lead-singer of Dutch 1975 Eurovision winner Teach-In Getty Kaspers, and lyricist and producer Emile Hartkamp. In addition to the performances of the competing songs, past Dutch Eurovision entrants Saskia and Serge (1971), Ben Cramer (1973), Heddy Lester (1977), Bill van Dijk (1982), Laura Vlasblom (1986), Rosina Brochard (1978) and Marga Bult (1987) were also present during the show. The first part of the national final was watched by 1.835 million viewers in the Netherlands with a market share of 24.4%, while the second part was watched by 1.848 million viewers with a market share of 30.3%.

Final – 1 February 2009
R/O	Song	Songwriter(s)	Jury	Televote	Total	Place
1	"Our Night"	Rutger Kanis, Robert Dorn	28	13	41	6
2	"Angel of the Night"	Edwin de Groot, Edwin van Hoevelaak, Bruce R.F. Smith	60	130	190	2
3	"Everybody Can Be a Star"	Ferdi Bolland	22	21	43	5
4	"Three Is the Magic Number"	Kees Tel, Christiaan Hulsebos	16	34	50	4
5	"No One Loves Me Like You"	Rob le Cardinale	36	21	57	3
6	"Shine"	Bas van den Heuvel, Ger van de Westelaken	48	201	249	1

Detailed Jury Votes
R/O	Song	T. Berk	T. Simić	D. Dekker	G. Kaspers	E. Hartkamp	Total
1	"Our Night"	4	10	2	8	4	28
2	"Angel of the Night"	12	12	12	12	12	60
3	"Everybody Can Be a Star"	6	4	4	2	6	22
4	"Three Is the Magic Number"	2	2	6	4	2	16
5	"No One Loves Me Like You"	8	6	8	6	8	36
6	"Shine"	10	8	10	10	10	48

=== Promotion ===
In the lead up to the Eurovision Song Contest, De Toppers' promotional activities occurred entirely within the Netherlands where they performed at live events, radio shows and talk shows. On 18 April, De Toppers performed during the Eurovision in Concert event which was held at the Amsterdam Marcanti venue and hosted by Marga Bult and Maggie MacNeal. Between 19 March and 7 May, the seven-episode docusoap Toppers op weg naar Moskou was broadcast on Nederland 1 which covered the group's promotional activities and preparations for the contest.

A Dutch-language version of "Angel of the Night" was covered by former Eurovision participant Gerard Joling (competed with "Shangri-La" in 1988), titled "Engel van mijn hart." The song was officially released on 4 September 2009.

== At Eurovision ==
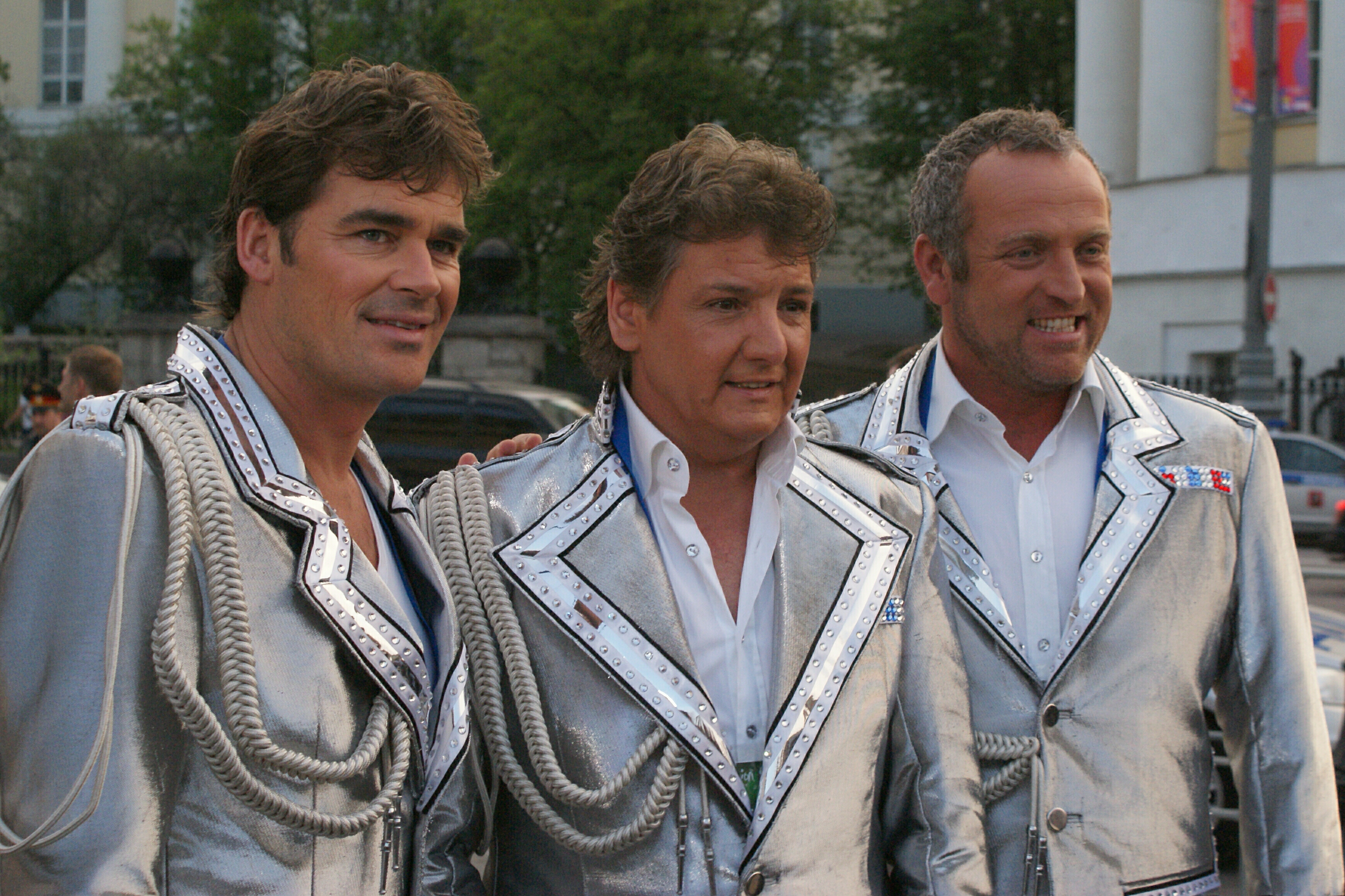
De Toppers at the Eurovision Opening Party in Moscow

According to Eurovision rules, all nations with the exceptions of the host country and the "Big Four" (France, Germany, Spain and the United Kingdom) are required to qualify from one of two semi-finals in order to compete for the final; the top nine songs from each semi-final as determined by televoting progress to the final, and a tenth was determined by back-up juries. The European Broadcasting Union (EBU) split up the competing countries into six different pots based on voting patterns from previous contests, with countries with favourable voting histories put into the same pot. On 30 January 2009, a special allocation draw was held which placed each country into one of the two semi-finals. The Netherlands was placed into the second semi-final, to be held on 14 May 2009. The running order for the semi-finals was decided through another draw on 16 March 2009. As one of the six wildcard countries, the Netherlands chose to perform last in position 19, following the entry from Estonia.

The two semi-finals and the final was broadcast in the Netherlands on Nederland 1 with commentary by Cornald Maas. The Dutch spokesperson, who announced the Dutch votes during the final, was Yolanthe Cabau van Kasbergen.

=== Semi-final ===
De Toppers took part in technical rehearsals on 6 and 10 May, followed by dress rehearsals on 13 and 14 May. The Dutch performance featured De Toppers wearing glittery suits and performing together with three backing vocalists, one of them carrying a DJ set. The performers also held lights in their palms. The predominantly dark stage with deep blue colours on a black background at first transitioned to flashing bright lights with the LED screens displaying shapes in blue, silver and white colours as well as the word "Shine". Several effects including fireworks, coloured bolts and silver fountains were used at the end of the performance. The three backing vocalists that joined De Toppers were: Dedre Twiss, Ingrid Simons and Sarina Voorn.

At the end of the show, the Netherlands was not announced among the top 10 entries in the second semi-final and therefore failed to qualify to compete in the final. It was later revealed that the Netherlands placed seventeenth in the semi-final, receiving a total of 11 points.

=== Voting ===
The voting system for 2009 involved each country awarding points from 1–8, 10 and 12, with the points in the final being decided by a combination of 50% national jury and 50% televoting. Each nation's jury consisted of five music industry professionals who are citizens of the country they represent. This jury judged each entry based on: vocal capacity; the stage performance; the song's composition and originality; and the overall impression by the act. In addition, no member of a national jury was permitted to be related in any way to any of the competing acts in such a way that they cannot vote impartially and independently.

Below is a breakdown of points awarded to the Netherlands and awarded by the Netherlands in the second semi-final and grand final of the contest. The nation awarded its 12 points to Norway in the semi-final and the final of the contest.

==== Points awarded to the Netherlands ====
Points awarded to the Netherlands (Semi-final 2)
Score	Country
12 points	
10 points	Albania
8 points	
7 points	
6 points	
5 points	
4 points	
3 points	
2 points	
1 point	Denmark

==== Points awarded by the Netherlands ====
Points awarded by the Netherlands (Semi-final 2)
Score	Country
12 points	Norway
10 points	Greece
8 points	Azerbaijan
7 points	Denmark
6 points	Serbia
5 points	Estonia
4 points	Moldova
3 points	Ireland
2 points	Poland
1 point	Albania

Points awarded by the Netherlands (Final)
Score	Country
12 points	Norway
10 points	Azerbaijan
8 points	Turkey
7 points	Iceland
6 points	France
5 points	Armenia
4 points	Bosnia and Herzegovina
3 points	United Kingdom
2 points	Germany
1 point	Greece

==== Detailed voting results ====
The following members comprised the Dutch jury:

- Noordje Kandt – former Dutch Head of Delegation for the Eurovision Song Contest
- Martin Gijzemijter – songwriter
- Setske Mostaert – vocal coach, singer
- Aron van der Ploeg – creative producer
- Henk Schepers – manager of the Dutch Metropole Orchestra

Detailed voting results from the Netherlands (Final)
R/O	Country	Results			Points
R/O	Country	Jury	Televoting	Combined	Points
01	Lithuania				
02	Israel	2		2	
03	France	10	2	12	6
04	Sweden				
05	Croatia				
06	Portugal				
07	Iceland	8	4	12	7
08	Greece		5	5	1
09	Armenia		10	10	5
10	Russia				
11	Azerbaijan	7	6	13	10
12	Bosnia and Herzegovina		7	7	4
13	Moldova				
14	Malta	1		1	
15	Estonia		1	1	
16	Denmark	5		5	
17	Germany	6		6	2
18	Turkey		12	12	8
19	Albania	3		3	
20	Norway	12	8	20	12
21	Ukraine				
22	Romania				
23	United Kingdom	4	3	7	3
24	Finland				
25	Spain				
