= Ansambel Roka Žlindre =

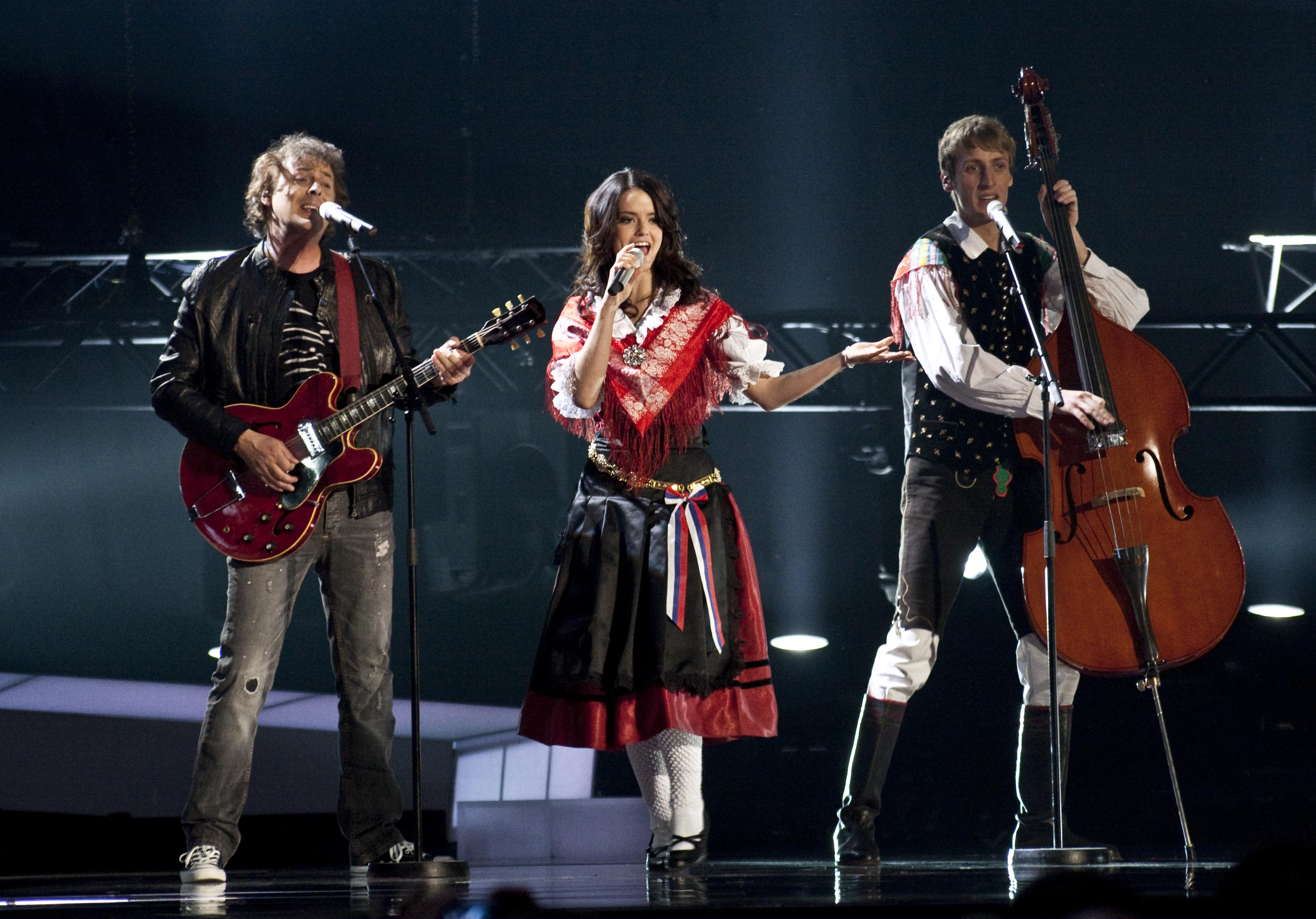
- Barbara Ogrinc (middle) and Rok Modic (right) of Ansambel Roka Žlindre performing with Matjaž Švagelj of Kalamari at Eurovision Song Contest 2010

Ansambel Roka Žlindre is a Slovenian musical group named after accordion player Rok Žlindra. The other members of the group are Barbara Ogrinc (born 4 February 1990) (vocals), Nejc Drobnič (acoustic guitar) and Rok Modic (double bass).

== Eurovision 2010 ==
Together with Kalamari, Ansambel Roka Žlindre represented Slovenia in the Eurovision Song Contest 2010 with the song "Narodnozabavni rock".

They did not qualify for the Eurovision Song Contest 2010 final from the second semifinal, reaching 16th place out of 17 with 6 points.

Preceded by Quartissimo feat. Martina with Love Symphony	Slovenia in the Eurovision Song Contest; 2010 (with Kalamari)	Succeeded by Maja Keuc with No One
