= Iceland in the Eurovision Song Contest 2009 =

- Eurovision Song Contest 2009
- Participating broadcaster: Ríkisútvarpið (RÚV)
- Country: Iceland
- Selection process: Söngvakeppni Sjónvarpsins 2009
- Selection date: 14 February 2009

Competing entry
- Song: "Is It True?"
- Artist: Yohanna
- Songwriters: Óskar Páll Sveinsson; Tinatin Japaridze; Christopher Neil

Placement
- Semi-final result: Qualified (1st, 174 points)
- Final result: 2nd, 218 points

Participation chronology

Iceland was represented at the Eurovision Song Contest 2009 with the song "Is It True?", written by Óskar Páll Sveinsson, Tinatin Japaridze, and Christopher Neil, and performed by Jóhanna Guðrún Jónsdóttir under her artistic name Yohanna. The Icelandic participating broadcaster, Ríkisútvarpið (RÚV), selected its entry through the national final Söngvakeppni Sjónvarpsins 2009. The selection consisted of four semi-finals and a final, held on 10 January, 17 January, 24 January, 31 January and 14 February 2009, respectively. Four songs competed in each semi-final with the top two as selected by a public televote advancing to the final. In the final, "Is It True?" performed by Yohanna emerged as the winner exclusively through public televoting.

Iceland was drawn to compete in the first semi-final of the Eurovision Song Contest which took place on 12 May 2009. Performing during the show in position 12, "Is It True?" was announced among the 10 qualifying entries of the first semi-final and therefore qualified to compete in the final on 16 May. It was later revealed that the Iceland placed first out of the 18 participating countries in the semi-final with 174 points. In the final, Iceland performed in position 7 and placed second out of the 25 participating countries, scoring 218 points.

== Background ==
Prior to the 2009 contest, Ríkisútvarpið (RÚV) had participated in the Eurovision Song Contest representing Iceland twenty-one times since its first entry in 1986. Its best placing in the contest to this point was second, achieved in 1999 with the song "All Out of Luck" performed by Selma. Since the introduction of a semi-final to the format of the Eurovision Song Contest in 2004, Iceland has, to this point, only failed to qualify to the final three times.

As part of its duties as participating broadcaster, RÚV organises the selection of its entry in the Eurovision Song Contest and broadcasts the event in the country. The broadcaster confirmed its intentions to participate at the 2009 contest on 14 September 2008. Since 2006, RÚV has used a national final to select their entry for the Eurovision Song Contest, a method that continued for its 2009 participation.

== Before Eurovision ==
=== Söngvakeppni Sjónvarpsins 2009 ===
The logo of Söngvakeppni Sjónvarpsins 2009

Söngvakeppni Sjónvarpsins 2009 was the national final format developed by RÚV in order to select Iceland's entry for the Eurovision Song Contest 2009. The five shows in the competition were hosted by Ragnhildur Steinunn Jónsdóttir and Eva María Jónsdóttir and all took place at the RÚV studios in Reykjavík. The semi-finals and final were broadcast on RÚV and online at the broadcaster's official website ruv.is.

==== Format ====
Sixteen songs in total competed in Söngvakeppni Sjónvarpsins 2009 where the winner was determined after four semi-finals and a final. Four songs competed in each semi-final on 10, 17, 24 and 31 January 2009. The top two songs from each semi-final qualified to the final which took place on 14 February 2009. The results of the semi-finals and final were determined by 100% public televoting.

==== Competing entries ====
On 14 September 2008, RÚV opened the submission period for interested songwriters to submit their entries until the deadline on 13 October 2008, which was later extended by one week to 20 October 2008. Songwriters were required to be Icelandic or possess Icelandic citizenship, and had the right to submit up to three entries. At the close of the submission deadline, 217 entries were received. A selection committee was formed in order to select the top fifteen entries, while an additional entry came from the winning composer of the 2008 competition Örlygur Smári, who was invited by RÚV for the competition. RÚV presented the sixteen competing artists and songs on 6, 13, 21 and 28 January 2009 via radio on Rás 2.

Artist	Song	Songwriter(s)
Arnar, Edgar, Sverrir and Ólafur	"Easy to Fool"	Torfi Ólafsson, Þorkell Olgeirsson
Edgar Smári	"The Kiss We Never Kissed"	Heimir Sindrason, Ari Harðarson
Elektra	"Got No Love"	Örlygur Smári, Sigurður Örn Jónsson
Erna Hrönn Ólafsdóttir	"Glópagull"	Einar Oddsson
Halla Vilhjálmsdóttir	"Roses"	Trausti Bjarnason, Halla Vilhjálmsdóttir
Heiða Ólafs	"Dagur nýr"	Halldór Guðjónsson, Íris Kristinsdóttir
Hreindís Ylva Garðarsdóttir Holm	"Vornótt"	Erla Gígja Þorvaldsdóttir, Hilmir Jóhannesson
Ingó	"Undir regnbogann"	Hallgrímur Óskarsson, Eiríkur Hauksson
Jógvan Hansen	"I Think the World of You"	Hallgrímur Óskarsson
Jóhanna Guðrún Jónsdóttir	"Is It True?"	Óskar Páll Sveinsson
Kaja Halldórsdóttir	"Lygin ein"	Albert G. Jónsson
Kristín Ósk Wium	"Close to You"	Grétar Sigurbergsson
Ólöf Jara Skagfjörð	"Hugur minn fylgir þér"	Valgeir Skagfjörð
Páll Rósinkrans	"Fósturjörð"	Einar Scheving
Seth Sharp	"Family"	Óskar Páll Sveinsson
Unnur Birna Björnsdóttir	"Cobwebs"	Heimir Sindrason, Ari Harðarson

==== Semi-finals ====
The four semi-finals took place on 10, 17, 24 and 31 January 2009. In each semi-final four acts presented their entries, and the top two entries voted upon solely by public televoting proceeded to the final.

Semi-final 1 – 10 January 2009
R/O	Artist	Song	Result
1	Heiða Ólafs	"Dagur nýr"	—N/a
2	Ólöf Jara Skagfjörð	"Hugur minn fylgir þér"	—N/a
3	Edgar Smári	"The Kiss We Never Kissed"	Qualifed
4	Jóhanna Guðrún Jónsdóttir	"Is It True?"	Qualifed

Semi-final 2 – 17 January 2009
R/O	Artist	Song	Result
1	Páll Rósinkrans	"Fósturjörð"	—N/a
2	Ingó	"Undir regnbogann"	Qualifed
3	Hreindís Ylva Garðarsdóttir Holm	"Vornótt"	Qualifed
4	Erna Hrönn Ólafsdóttir	"Glópagull"	—N/a

Semi-final 3 – 24 January 2009
R/O	Artist	Song	Result
1	Seth Sharp	"Family"	—N/a
2	Arnar, Edgar, Sverrir and Ólafur	"Easy to Fool"	Qualifed
3	Kristín Ósk Wium	"Close to You"	—N/a
4	Kaja Halldórsdóttir	"Lygin ein"	Qualifed

Semi-final 4 – 31 January 2009
R/O	Artist	Song	Result
1	Unnur Birna Björnsdóttir	"Cobwebs"	—N/a
2	Jógvan Hansen	"I Think the World of You"	Qualifed
3	Elektra	"Got No Love"	Qualifed
4	Halla Vilhjálmsdóttir	"Roses"	—N/a

==== Final ====
The final took place on 14 February 2009 where the eight entries that qualified from the preceding three semi-finals competed. The winner, "Is It True?" performed by Jóhanna Guðrún Jónsdóttir, was determined solely by televoting. In addition to the performances of the competing artists, the show was opened by a medley featuring 2008 Icelandic Eurovision entrant Euroband covering past Eurovision entries which included their song "This Is My Life", while the interval act featured guest performances by 1997 Icelandic Eurovision entrant Páll Óskar.

Final – 14 February 2009
R/O	Artist	Song	Televote	Place
1	Arnar, Edgar, Sverrir and Ólafur	"Easy to Fool"	—	—
2	Jógvan Hansen	"I Think the World of You"	9,693	4
3	Kaja Halldórsdottir	"Lygin ein"	—	—
4	Hreindís Ylva Garðarsdóttir Holm	"Vornótt"	—	—
5	Elektra	"Got No Love"	10,214	3
6	Edgar Smári	"The Kiss We Never Kissed"	—	—
7	Ingó	"Undir regnbogann"	10,696	2
8	Jóhanna Guðrún Jónsdóttir	"Is It True?"	19,076	1

=== Promotion ===
Yohanna made several appearances across Europe to specifically promote "Is It True?" as the Icelandic Eurovision entry. On 17 April, Yohanna performed during the UKeurovision Preview Party, which was held at the La Scala venue in London, United Kingdom and hosted by Nicki French and Paddy O'Connell. On 18 April, Yohanna performed during the Eurovision Promo Concert, which was held at the Marcanti venue in Amsterdam, Netherlands and hosted by Marga Bult and Maggie MacNeal.

== At Eurovision ==
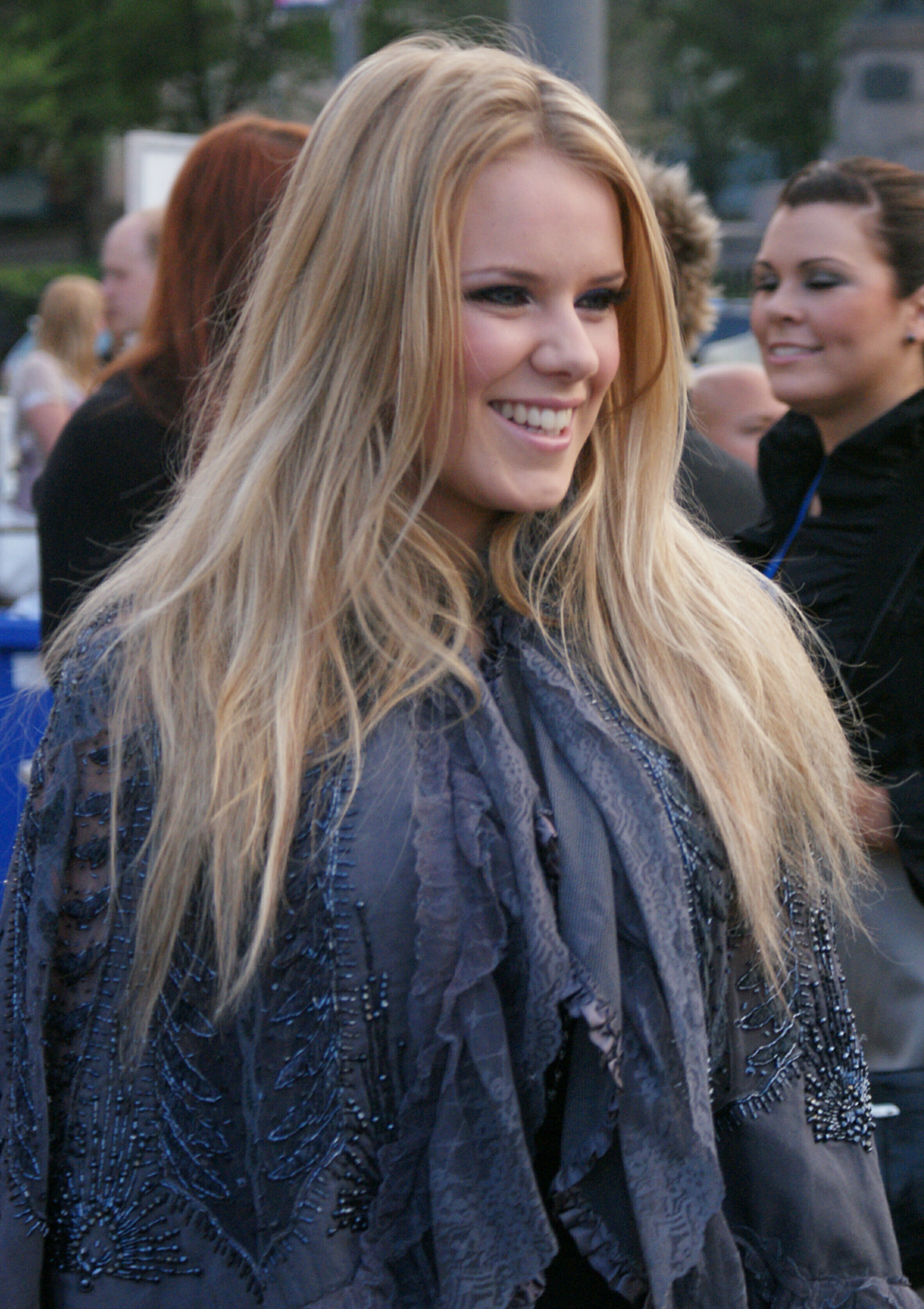
Yohanna at the Eurovision Opening Party in Moscow

According to Eurovision rules, all nations with the exceptions of the host country and the "Big Four" (France, Germany, Spain and the United Kingdom) are required to qualify from one of two semi-finals in order to compete for the final; the top nine songs from each semi-final as determined by televoting progress to the final, and a tenth was determined by back-up juries. The European Broadcasting Union (EBU) split up the competing countries into six different pots based on voting patterns from previous contests, with countries with favourable voting histories put into the same pot. On 30 January 2009, a special allocation draw was held which placed each country into one of the two semi-finals. Iceland was placed into the first semi-final, to be held on 12 May 2009. The running order for the semi-finals was decided through another draw on 16 March 2009 and Iceland was set to perform in position 12, following the entry from Bulgaria and before the entry from Macedonia.

The two semi-finals and the final were broadcast in Iceland on RÚV with commentary by Sigmar Guðmundsson. The Icelandic spokesperson, who announced the Icelandic votes during the final, was Þóra Tómasdóttir.

=== Semi-final ===
Yohanna took part in technical rehearsals on 4 and 7 May, followed by dress rehearsals on 11 and 12 May. This included the jury show on 11 May where the professional juries of each country watched and voted on the competing entries.

The Icelandic performance featured Yohanna in a pale blue dress decorated with dark blue feathers, joined on stage by a guitarist and cellist sitting on a white chair as well as three backing vocalists dressed in dark blue and grey outfits. The LED screens displayed a blue background with clouds and a full moon, which transitioned to a dawning scene at the end of the song. The performance also featured smoke effects and the use of a wind machine. The guitarist and cellist that joined Yohanna were Börkur Birgisson and Hallgrímur Jensson, respectively, while the backing vocalists were: Erna Hrönn Ólafsdóttir, Friðrik Ómar Hjörleifsson and Hera Björk Þórhallsdóttir. Friðrik Ómar Hjörleifsson previously represented Iceland in 2008 as part of Euroband; Hera Björk Þórhallsdóttir would go on to represent Iceland twice at Eurovision, in both the following year 2010 and 2024

At the end of the show, Iceland was announced as having finished in the top 10 and subsequently qualifying for the grand final. It was later revealed that Iceland placed first in the semi-final, receiving a total of 174 points.

=== Final ===
Shortly after the first semi-final, a winners' press conference was held for the ten qualifying countries. As part of this press conference, the qualifying artists took part in a draw to determine the running order for the final. This draw was done in the order the countries appeared in the semi-final running order. Iceland was drawn to perform in position 7, following the entry from Portugal and before the entry from Greece.

Yohanna once again took part in dress rehearsals on 15 and 16 May before the final, including the jury final where the professional juries cast their final votes before the live show. Yohanna performed a repeat of her semi-final performance during the final on 16 May. At the conclusion of the voting, Iceland finished in second place with 218 points.

=== Voting ===
The voting system for 2009 involved each country awarding points from 1-8, 10 and 12, with the points in the final being decided by a combination of 50% national jury and 50% televoting. Each nation's jury consisted of five music industry professionals who are citizens of the country they represent. This jury judged each entry based on: vocal capacity; the stage performance; the song's composition and originality; and the overall impression by the act. In addition, no member of a national jury was permitted to be related in any way to any of the competing acts in such a way that they cannot vote impartially and independently.

Following the release of the full split voting by the EBU after the conclusion of the competition, it was revealed that Iceland had placed fourth with the public televote and second with the jury vote in the final. In the public vote, Iceland scored 173 points, while with the jury vote, Iceland scored 260 points.

Below is a breakdown of points awarded to and by Iceland in the first semi-final and grand final of the contest. The nation awarded its 12 points to Finland in the semi-final and to Norway in the final of the contest.

==== Points awarded to Iceland ====
Points awarded to Iceland (Semi-final 1)
Score	Country
12 points	Armenia; Belarus; Finland; Israel; Malta; Portugal; Sweden
10 points	Andorra; Czech Republic; Romania
8 points	Turkey; United Kingdom
7 points	Belgium; Bosnia and Herzegovina; Montenegro; Switzerland
6 points	Bulgaria; Germany
5 points	
4 points	Macedonia
3 points	
2 points	
1 point	

Points awarded to Iceland (Final)
Score	Country
12 points	Ireland; Malta; Norway
10 points	Denmark; Finland; Israel; Romania; Sweden
8 points	Andorra; Estonia; Latvia; Lithuania; Portugal; United Kingdom
7 points	Germany; Hungary; Netherlands
6 points	Albania; Slovakia
5 points	Armenia; Bulgaria; Cyprus; Montenegro; Slovenia; Switzerland
4 points	Greece
3 points	Moldova; Russia
2 points	Belarus; Croatia; Czech Republic; Macedonia; Turkey
1 point	Poland

==== Points awarded by Iceland ====
Points awarded by Iceland (Semi-final 1)
Score	Country
12 points	Finland
10 points	Sweden
8 points	Portugal
7 points	Turkey
6 points	Israel
5 points	Malta
4 points	Romania
3 points	Bosnia and Herzegovina
2 points	Armenia
1 point	Belarus

Points awarded by Iceland (Final)
Score	Country
12 points	Norway
10 points	Estonia
8 points	Finland
7 points	Portugal
6 points	France
5 points	Armenia
4 points	Denmark
3 points	Sweden
2 points	Bosnia and Herzegovina
1 point	Croatia

==== Detailed voting results ====
Detailed voting results from Iceland (Final)
R/O	Country	Results			Points
R/O	Country	Jury	Televoting	Combined	Points
01	Lithuania				
02	Israel				
03	France	10		10	6
04	Sweden	1	5	6	3
05	Croatia	5		5	1
06	Portugal	3	7	10	7
07	Iceland				
08	Greece		1	1	
09	Armenia	8		8	5
10	Russia				
11	Azerbaijan		4	4	
12	Bosnia and Herzegovina	6		6	2
13	Moldova	2		2	
14	Malta				
15	Estonia	7	8	15	10
16	Denmark		6	6	4
17	Germany				
18	Turkey		2	2	
19	Albania		3	3	
20	Norway	12	12	24	12
21	Ukraine				
22	Romania				
23	United Kingdom	4		4	
24	Finland		10	10	8
25	Spain				
