= Germany in the Eurovision Song Contest 2009 =

- Eurovision Song Contest 2009
- Participating broadcaster: ARD (Note: Arbeitsgemeinschaft der öffentlich-rechtlichen Rundfunkanstalten der Bundesrepublik Deutschland) – Norddeutscher Rundfunk (NDR)
- Country: Germany
- Selection process: Internal selection
- Announcement date: Artist: 9 February 2009; Song: 21 February 2009

Competing entry
- Song: "Miss Kiss Kiss Bang"
- Artist: Alex Swings Oscar Sings!
- Songwriters: Alex Christensen; Steffen Häfelinger

Placement
- Final result: 20th, 35 points

Participation chronology

Germany was represented at the Eurovision Song Contest 2009 with the song "Miss Kiss Kiss Bang", written by Alex Christensen and Steffen Häfelinger, and performed by Alex Swings Oscar Sings!, consisting of producer Alex Christensen and singer Oscar Loya. The German participating broadcaster on behalf of ARD, Norddeutscher Rundfunk (NDR), internally selected its entry for the contest. The announcement of "Miss Kiss Kiss Bang" as the German entry occurred on 9 February 2009 and the presentation of the song occurred during the Echo Music Prize awards show on 21 February 2009.

As a member of the "Big Four", Germany automatically qualified to compete in the final of the Eurovision Song Contest. Performing in position 17, Germany placed twentieth out of the 25 participating countries with 35 points.

== Background ==
Prior to the 2009 contest, ARD had participated in the Eurovision Song Contest representing Germany fifty-two times since its debut in 1956. It has won the contest on one occasion: in 1982 with the song "Ein bißchen Frieden" performed by Nicole. Germany, to this point, has been noted for having competed in the contest more than any other country; they have competed in every contest since the first edition in 1956 except for 1996 when it was eliminated in a pre-contest elimination round. In 2008, the German entry "Disappear" performed by No Angels placed twenty-third out of twenty-five competing songs scoring 14 points.

As part of its duties as participating broadcaster, ARD organises the selection of its entry in the Eurovision Song Contest and broadcasts the event in the country. Since 1996, ARD had delegated the participation in the contest to its member Norddeutscher Rundfunk (NDR). NDR confirmed that it would participate in the 2009 contest on 9 June 2008. Since 1996, NDR had set up national finals with several artists to choose both the song and performer. Following the resignation of Thomas Hermanns as the national final host, there were rumours that the 2009 national final would feature changes. Instead, ARD's entertainment coordinator Thomas Schreiber announced on 16 December 2008 that they would be "taking a break from the usual procedure" and organise an internal selection to select their entry.

== Before Eurovision ==
=== Internal selection ===
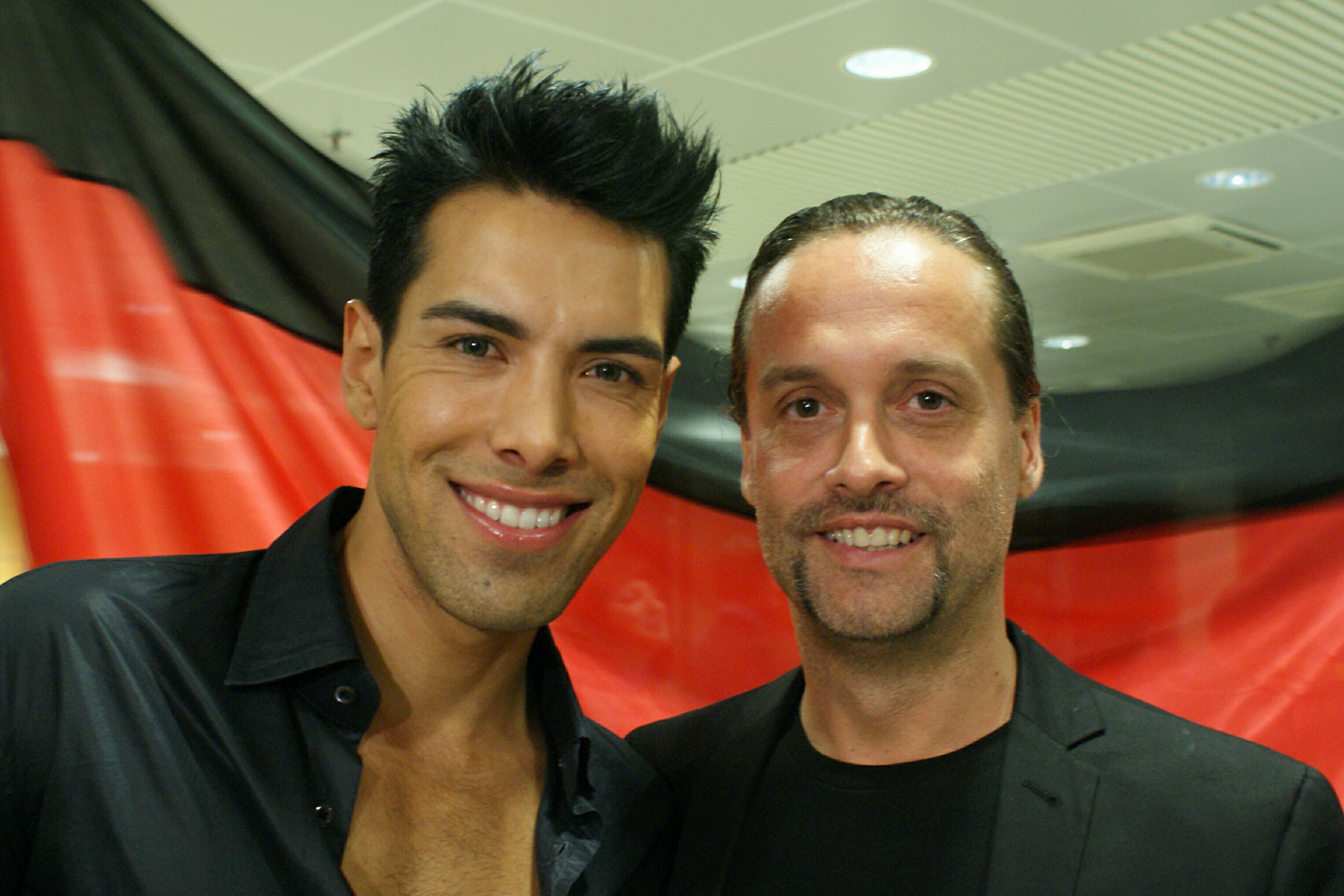
Alex Swings Oscar Sings! were internally selected to represent Germany in the Eurovision Song Contest 2009

NDR announced on 16 December 2008 that the German entry for the Eurovision Song Contest 2009 would be selected internally. A submission period was opened on the same day where composers and lyricists that hold membership of GEMA or a music society in their home country since 1 December 2007 and have achieved chart success were able to submit their entries until 22 January 2009. NDR also invited record companies and producers to submit proposals. Approximately 100 entries were received at the closing of the deadline.

On 9 February 2009. "Miss Kiss Kiss Bang" performed by Alex Christensen and American singer Oscar Loya, under the stage name Alex Swings Oscar Sings!, was announced by NDR as the German entry for the 2009 Eurovision Song Contest. The song was written by Alex Christensen together with Steffen Häfelinger, and was selected by a five-member panel consisting of Heinz Canibol (105music managing director), Guildo Horn (singer, 1998 German Eurovision entrant), Sylvia Kollek (music consultant), Ralf Quibeldey (head of the talk and entertainment department for NDR) and Peter Urban (musician and radio host, 12-times German commentator for the Eurovision Song Contest). "Miss Kiss Kiss Bang" was presented to the public during the Echo 2009 music awards show which took place on 21 February 2009 at the O2 World Arena in Berlin, hosted by Barbara Schöneberger and Oliver Pocher and broadcast on Das Erste.

=== Promotion ===
Alex Swings Oscar Sings! made several appearances across Europe to specifically promote "Miss Kiss Kiss Bang" as the German Eurovision entry. On 18 April, Alex Swings Oscar Sings! performed during the Eurovision Promo Concert, which was held at the Amsterdam Marcanti venue in Amsterdam, Netherlands and hosted by Marga Bult and Maggie MacNeal. On 5 May, the duo performed in Spain during the La 1 programme Los mejores años de nuestra vida. The duo also appeared and performed during the Oprah Winfrey Show in the United States on 14 May.

== At Eurovision ==
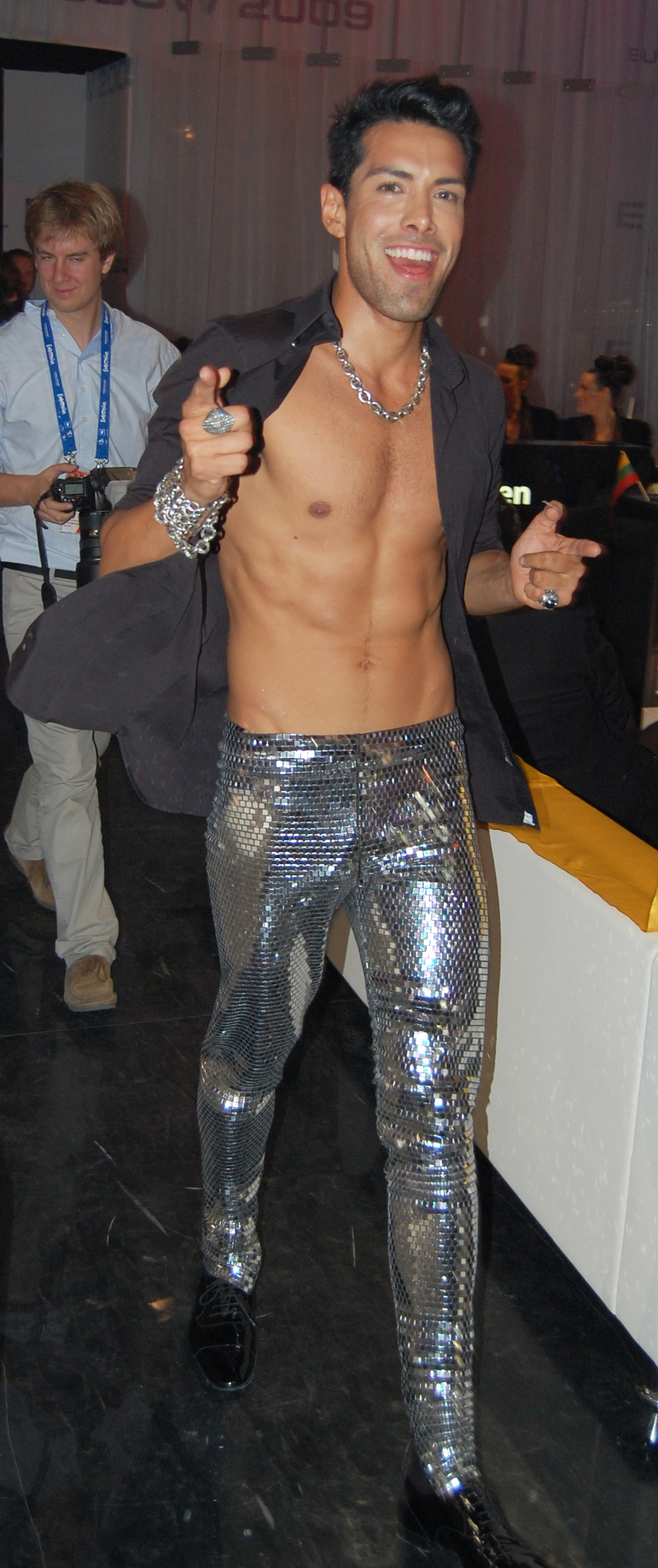
Oscar Loya at the Eurovision Song Contest

According to Eurovision rules, all nations with the exceptions of the host country and the "Big Four" (France, Germany, Spain and the United Kingdom) are required to qualify from the semi-final in order to compete for the final; the top ten countries from the semi-final progress to the final. As a member of the "Big Four", Germany automatically qualified to compete in the final on 16 May 2009. In addition to their participation in the final, Germany is also required to broadcast and vote in one of the two semi-finals. During the semi-final allocation draw on 24 January 2008, Germany was assigned to broadcast and vote in the first semi-final on 12 May 2009.

In Germany, the first semi-final was broadcast on Phoenix, the second semi-final was broadcast on NDR Fernsehen with a two-hour delay and the final was broadcast on Das Erste. All broadcasts featured commentary by Tim Frühling who replaced Peter Urban due to illness. The final was watched by 7.33 million viewers in Germany, which meant a market share of 31 per cent. The German spokesperson, who announced the top 12-point score awarded by the German vote during the final, was Thomas Anders.

=== Final ===
Alex Swings Oscar Sings! took part in technical rehearsals on 9 and 10 May, followed by dress rehearsals on 15 and 16 May. This included the jury show on 15 May where the professional juries of each country watched and voted on the competing entries. During the running order draw for the semi-finals and the final on 16 March 2009, Germany was placed to perform in position 17 in the final, following the entry from Denmark and before the entry from Turkey.

The German performance featured Alex Swings Oscar Sings! performing on stage with two dancers and a backing vocalist. Alex Christensen was on the left of the stage playing the piano and Oscar Loya was in front of a platform situated on the right of the stage with a gigantic pierced black lips placed on it. At the end of the performance, the lips moved revealing American burlesque model Dita von Teese sitting on them. The LED screens displayed the words "Miss Kiss Kiss" and a moving doll, and von Teese's name was also displayed on the LED screens on top of the stage. The German performance was created by Florian Wieder and Volker Weicker, while the artistic director was Jane Comerford who previously represented Germany at the 2006 contest as part of the band Texas Lightning. Germany placed twentieth in the final, scoring 35 points.

=== Voting ===
The voting system for 2009 involved each country awarding points from 1-8, 10 and 12, with the points in the final being decided by a combination of 50% national jury and 50% televoting. Each nation's jury consisted of five music industry professionals who are citizens of the country they represent. This jury judged each entry based on: vocal capacity; the stage performance; the song's composition and originality; and the overall impression by the act. In addition, no member of a national jury was permitted to be related in any way to any of the competing acts in such a way that they cannot vote impartially and independently.

Following the release of the full split voting by the EBU after the conclusion of the competition, it was revealed that Germany had placed twenty-third with the public televote and fourteenth with the jury vote in the final. In the public vote, Germany 18 points, while with the jury vote, Germany scored 73 points.

Below is a breakdown of points awarded to Germany and awarded by Germany in the first semi-final and grand final of the contest, and the breakdown of the voting conducted during the two shows. Germany awarded its 12 points to Turkey in the first semi-final and to Norway in the grand final of the contest.

==== Points awarded to Germany ====
Points awarded to Germany (Final)
Score	Country
12 points	
10 points	
8 points	
7 points	Denmark; United Kingdom
6 points	Norway
5 points	
4 points	
3 points	Albania; France
2 points	Belgium; Bosnia and Herzegovina; Netherlands
1 point	Ireland; Portugal; Turkey

==== Points awarded by Germany ====
Points awarded by Germany (Semi-final 1)
Score	Country
12 points	Turkey
10 points	Armenia
8 points	Bosnia and Herzegovina
7 points	Portugal
6 points	Iceland
5 points	Israel
4 points	Sweden
3 points	Malta
2 points	Montenegro
1 point	Romania

Points awarded by Germany (Final)
Score	Country
12 points	Norway
10 points	Turkey
8 points	United Kingdom
7 points	Iceland
6 points	Greece
5 points	Russia
4 points	Malta
3 points	France
2 points	Bosnia and Herzegovina
1 point	Estonia

==== Detailed voting results ====
The following members comprised the German jury:

- H. P. Baxxter – singer and producer of the band Scooter
- Jeanette Biedermann – singer
- Guildo Horn – singer, represented Germany in the 1998 contest
- Sylvia Kollek Künzel – artist manager
- Tobias Künzel – singer

Detailed voting results from Germany (Final)
R/O	Country	Results			Points
R/O	Country	Jury	Televoting	Combined	Points
01	Lithuania				
02	Israel	3		3	
03	France	7		7	3
04	Sweden				
05	Croatia				
06	Portugal	2		2	
07	Iceland	12	1	13	7
08	Greece		10	10	6
09	Armenia		3	3	
10	Russia	4	6	10	5
11	Azerbaijan		4	4	
12	Bosnia and Herzegovina		5	5	2
13	Moldova				
14	Malta	10		10	4
15	Estonia	5		5	1
16	Denmark		2	2	
17	Germany				
18	Turkey	1	12	13	10
19	Albania				
20	Norway	8	8	16	12
21	Ukraine				
22	Romania				
23	United Kingdom	6	7	13	8
24	Finland				
25	Spain				
