= Croatia in the Eurovision Song Contest 2009 =

- Eurovision Song Contest 2009
- Participating broadcaster: Hrvatska radiotelevizija (HRT)
- Country: Croatia
- Selection process: Dora 2009
- Selection date: 28 February 2009

Competing entry
- Song: "Lijepa Tena"
- Artist: Igor Cukrov feat. Andrea
- Songwriters: Tonči Huljić; Vjekoslava Huljić

Placement
- Semi-final result: Qualified (13th, 33 points)
- Final result: 18th, 45 points

Participation chronology

Croatia was represented at the Eurovision Song Contest 2009 with the song "Lijepa Tena", written by Tonči Huljić and Vjekoslava Huljić, and performed by Igor Cukrov featuring Andrea. The Croatian participating broadcaster, Hrvatska radiotelevizija (HRT), organised the national final Dora 2009 to select its entry for the contest. A total of twenty-four entries competed in the national final which consisted of two shows: a semi-final and a final. In the semi-final on 27 February 2009, six entries qualified to compete in the final on 28 February 2009 alongside ten pre-qualified songs. In the final, "Lijepa Tena" performed by Igor Cukrov was selected as the winner following the combination of votes from a six-member jury panel and a public televote.

Croatia was drawn to compete in the second semi-final of the Eurovision Song Contest which took place on 14 May 2009. Performing as the opening entry for the show in position 1, "Lijepa Tena" was announced among the ten qualifying entries of the second semi-final and therefore qualified to compete in the final on 16 May. It was later revealed that Croatia had been selected by back-up juries to qualify after placing thirteenth out of the 19 participating countries in the semi-final with 33 points. In the final, Croatia performed in position 5 and placed eighteenth out of the 25 participating countries, scoring 45 points.

== Background ==
Prior to the 2009 contest, Hrvatska radiotelevizija (HRT) had participated in the Eurovision Song Contest representing Croatia sixteen times since its first entry in 1993. Its best result in the contest was fourth, achieved on two occasions: in 1996 with the song "Sveta ljubav" performed by Maja Blagdan and in 1999 with the song "Marija Magdalena" performed by Doris Dragović. Following the introduction of semi-finals for the 2004, Croatia had thus far featured in four finals. In 2008, Kraljevi ulice and 75 Cents and the song "Romanca" managed to qualify to the final.

As part of its duties as participating broadcaster, HRT organises the selection of its entry in the Eurovision Song Contest and broadcasts the event in the country. The broadcaster confirmed its participation in the 2009 contest on 20 October 2008. Since 1993, HRT organised the national final Dora in order to select its entry for the Eurovision Song Contest, a method that was continued for its 2009 participation.

== Before Eurovision ==
=== Dora 2009 ===
Dora 2009 was the seventeenth edition of the Croatian national selection Dora which selected Croatia's entry for the Eurovision Song Contest 2009. The competition consisted of a semi-final and a final on 27 and 28 February 2009 both taking place at the Hotel Kvarner in Opatija. The semi-final was broadcast on HRT 2, while the final was broadcast on HRT 1. Both shows were also broadcast via radio on HR 2 and online via the broadcaster's website hrt.hr.

==== Format ====
A total of twenty-four songs competed in Dora 2009 which consisted of two shows: a semi-final and a final. Fourteen of the songs were selected from open submissions and competed in the semi-final with public televoting selecting the top six to proceed to the final. In the final, the six qualifying songs in the semi-final alongside an additional ten pre-qualified songs competed and the winner was selected by votes from the public and a jury panel. Ties in the final were decided in favour of the entry that received the most points from the jury.

==== Competing entries ====
On 26 October 2008, HRT opened a submission period where artists and composers were able to submit their entries to the broadcaster with the deadline on 12 December 2008. 199 entries were received by the broadcaster during the submission period. A six-member expert committee consisting of Silvije Glojnarić (HRT), Robert Urlić (HR), Mirko Fodor (HTV), Željen Klašterka (HTV), Aleksandar Kostadinov (HTV) and Đurđica Ivanković (HR) reviewed the received submissions and selected fourteen artists and songs for the semi-final of the competition, while the ten pre-qualifying songs for the final were written by composers invited by HRT in consultation with the Croatian Composers' Society (HDS). The composers also selected the performer for their entry. The invited composers were announced on 15 December 2008 and were:

- Ante Pecotić
- Boris Đurđević
- Bruno Kovačić
- Denis Dumančić
- Hari Rončević
- Miroslav Rus
- Nenad Ninčević and Miro Buljan
- Rajko Dujmić
- Tonči Huljić
- Zrinko Tutić

HRT announced the entries competing in the semi-final on 28 January 2009 during the radio programme Turki party broadcast on HR 2 and hosted by Zlatko Turkalj Turki. Among the artists were Goran Karan who represented Croatia in the Eurovision Song Contest 2000 and Feminnem which represented Bosnia and Herzegovina in the Eurovision Song Contest 2005. The pre-qualified entries competing in the final were announced on 28 January 2009. On 15 January 2009, the song "Raduj se", written by Boris Novković who represented Croatia in the Eurovision Song Contest 2005, was withdrawn from the semi-final and replaced with "Kao jedno" performed by Sandra Bagarić. On 2 February 2009, Goran Karan withdrew his song "Adam i Eva" from the semi-final and replaced with "Ma gdje bila" performed by Mario Battifiaca.

| Artist | Song | Songwriter(s) | Selection |
|---|---|---|---|
| Alen Vitasović and Lela Kaplowitz | "Tamo gdje ljubav počinje" | Emilija Kokić, Haris Brković, Antonija Šola | Open submission |
| Ana Bebić | "Mrzim spore stvari" | Nenad Ninčević, Miro Buljan | Invited by HRT |
| Aria | "Istina je" | Ante Pecotić | Open submission |
| Čager Zoc and Papak Dance Company | "Ritam da se ritam" | Miran Hadži Veljković, Zlatko Petrović | Open submission |
| Danijela Pintarić | "Zlatna rijeka" | Zrinko Tutić | Invited by HRT |
| Denis Dumančić | "Srce moram seliti" | Denis Dumančić, Fayo, Zorica Dumančić | Invited by HRT |
| Dražen Žanko | "Samo ti" | Dražen Žanko, Matija Fuček | Open submission |
| Feminnem | "Poljupci u boji" | Branimir Mihaljević, Neda Parmać | Open submission |
| Franka Batelić | "Pjesma za kraj" | Boris Đurđević, Miro Buljan, Nenad Ninčević | Invited by HRT |
| Hari Rončević and Kvartet Bravo | "Još uvik" | Hari Rončević | Invited by HRT |
| Igor Cukrov | "Lijepa Tena" | Tonči Huljić, Vjekoslava Huljić | Invited by HRT |
| Ivo Gamulin Gianni | "Daj mi jedan razlog" | Alka Vuica, Darko Dimitrov | Open submission |
| Jelena Radan | "Voljet ću te sutra" | Meri Jaman, Anita Valo, Ines Prajo, Arjana Kunstek | Open submission |
| Maja Vučić | "Tebe imam ja" | Duško Rapotec-Ute, Robert Pilepić | Open submission |
| Mario Battifiaca | "Ma gdje bila" | Robert Grubišić, Marina Valković | Open submission |
| Marko Tolja | "Stranci" | Olja Dešić | Open submission |
| Marta Kuliš | "Makni se" | Srđan Sekulović-Skansi, Gojko Tomljanović | Open submission |
| Mijo Lešina | "To nisam ja" | Bruno Kovačić | Invited by HRT |
| Ricardo Luque and Maja Vasilj | "Ljubav ima njeno lice" | Duško Rapotec-Ute, Robert Pilepić | Open submission |
| Ruswaj | "Što će mi ljubav" | Miroslav Rus | Invited by HRT |
| Sandra Bagarić | "Kao jedno" | Inge Privora, Dražen Scholz | Invited by HRT |
| Sane | "Dečko" | Nikola Marjanović, Thomas Balaž, Stjepan Krznarić | Open submission |
| Tomislav Bralić and Klapa Intrade | "Ne damo te pismo naša" | Ivica Badurina, Branko Slivar | Open submission |
| Viva | "Opet" | Miro Buljan, Nenad Ninčević | Invited by HRT |

==== Semi-final ====
The semi-final took place on 27 February 2009, hosted by Duško Ćurlić and Nevena Rendeli with Ida Prester and Iva Šulentić hosting segments from the green room. The six qualifiers for the final were determined exclusively by a public televote. In addition to the performances of the competing entries, the show was opened by the National Folk Dance Ensemble of Croatia LADO, while British Eurovision Song Contest 1976 winner Brotherhood of Man performed as the interval act.

Semi-final – 27 February 2009
| R/O | Artist | Song | Televote | Place |
|---|---|---|---|---|
| 1 | Sandra Bagarić | "Kao jedno" | 560 | 12 |
| 2 | Maja Vučić | "Tebe imam ja" | 489 | 13 |
| 3 | Ricardo Luque and Maja Vasilj | "Ljubav ima njeno lice" | 616 | 10 |
| 4 | Alen Vitasović and Lela Kaplowitz | "Tamo gdje ljubav počinje" | 648 | 9 |
| 5 | Sane | "Dečko" | 837 | 8 |
| 6 | Tomislav Bralić and Klapa Intrade | "Ne damo te pismo naša" | 3,957 | 1 |
| 7 | Dražen Žanko | "Samo ti" | 1,202 | 5 |
| 8 | Marta Kuliš | "Makni se" | 432 | 14 |
| 9 | Jelena Radan | "Voljet ću te sutra" | 573 | 11 |
| 10 | Mario Battifiaca | "Ma gdje bila" | 2,380 | 3 |
| 11 | Čager Zoc and Papak Dance Company | "Ritam da se ritam" | 1,116 | 6 |
| 12 | Marko Tolja | "Stranci" | 855 | 7 |
| 13 | Ivo Gamulin Gianni | "Daj mi jedan razlog" | 2,488 | 2 |
| 14 | Feminnem | "Poljupci u boji" | 1,941 | 4 |

==== Final ====
The final took place on 28 February 2009, hosted by Duško Ćurlić and Danijela Trbović with Ida Prester and Iva Šulentić hosting segments from the green room. The six entries that qualified from the semi-final alongside the ten pre-qualified entries competed and the winner, "Lijepa Tena" performed by Igor Cukrov, was determined by a 50/50 combination of votes from a six-member jury panel and a public televote. The jury that voted in the final consisted of Đurđica Ivanković (HR), Silvije Glojnarić (HRT), Mirko Fodor (HTV), Aleksandar Kostadinov (HTV), Željen Klašterka (HTV) and Robert Urlić (HR). In addition to the performances of the competing entries, the show was opened by 2008 Croatian Eurovision entrant Kraljevi ulice, while Paul Young performed as the interval act.

Final – 28 February 2009
| R/O | Artist | Song | Jury | Televote | | Total | Place |
| R/O | Artist | Song | Jury | Votes | Points | Total | Place |
|---|---|---|---|---|---|---|---|
| 1 | Ana Bebić | "Mrzim spore stvari" | 2 | 1,916 | 11 | 13 | 12 |
| 2 | Hari Rončević and Kvartet Bravo | "Još uvik" | 7 | 229 | 1 | 8 | 14 |
| 3 | Ruswaj | "Što će mi ljubav" | 3 | 566 | 4 | 7 | 15 |
| 4 | Mijo Lešina | "To nisam ja" | 12 | 278 | 2 | 14 | 10 |
| 5 | Dražen Žanko | "Samo ti" | 10 | 651 | 7 | 17 | 8 |
| 6 | Franka Batelić | "Pjesma za kraj" | 4 | 2,808 | 14 | 18 | 7 |
| 7 | Mario Battifiaca | "Ma gdje bila" | 7 | 1,814 | 10 | 17 | 9 |
| 8 | Viva | "Opet" | 1 | 602 | 6 | 7 | 16 |
| 9 | Ivo Gamulin Gianni | "Daj mi jedan razlog" | 14 | 2,572 | 13 | 27 | 4 |
| 10 | Feminnem | "Poljupci u boji" | 16 | 2,147 | 12 | 28 | 3 |
| 11 | Denis Dumančić | "Srce moram seliti" | 5 | 585 | 5 | 10 | 13 |
| 12 | Danijela Pintarić | "Zlatna rijeka" | 10 | 557 | 3 | 13 | 11 |
| 13 | Čager Zoc and Papak Dance Company | "Ritam da se ritam" | 10 | 1,319 | 9 | 19 | 6 |
| 14 | Tomislav Bralić and Klapa Intrade | "Ne damo te pismo naša" | 13 | 7,140 | 16 | 29 | 2 |
| 15 | Igor Cukrov (Note: Featured uncredited vocals from Andrea Šušnjara.) | "Lijepa Tena" | 15 | 3,520 | 15 | 30 | 1 |
| 16 | Aria | "Istina je" | 11 | 940 | 8 | 19 | 5 |

Detailed Jury Votes
| R/O | Song | Juror | | | | | | Total | Points |
| R/O | Song | 1 | 2 | 3 | 4 | 5 | 6 | Total | Points |
|---|---|---|---|---|---|---|---|---|---|
| 1 | "Mrzim spore stvari" | 6 | 6 | 7 | 6 | 7 | 7 | 39 | 2 |
| 2 | "Još uvik" | 8 | 7 | 8 | 7 | 8 | 8 | 46 | 7 |
| 3 | "Što će mi ljubav" | 8 | 6 | 7 | 7 | 6 | 6 | 40 | 3 |
| 4 | "To nisam ja" | 9 | 8 | 9 | 8 | 9 | 8 | 51 | 12 |
| 5 | "Samo ti" | 7 | 7 | 8 | 8 | 9 | 8 | 47 | 10 |
| 6 | "Pjesma za kraj" | 6 | 6 | 7 | 8 | 8 | 7 | 42 | 4 |
| 7 | "Ma gdje bila" | 8 | 8 | 8 | 8 | 7 | 7 | 46 | 7 |
| 8 | "Opet" | 6 | 6 | 6 | 7 | 6 | 6 | 37 | 1 |
| 9 | "Daj mi jedan razlog" | 10 | 8 | 9 | 8 | 10 | 9 | 54 | 14 |
| 10 | "Poljupci u boji" | 10 | 10 | 9 | 9 | 10 | 9 | 57 | 16 |
| 11 | "Srce moram seliti" | 8 | 6 | 8 | 8 | 7 | 7 | 44 | 5 |
| 12 | "Zlatna rijeka" | 7 | 8 | 7 | 8 | 9 | 8 | 47 | 10 |
| 13 | "Ritam da se ritam" | 8 | 7 | 8 | 8 | 8 | 8 | 47 | 10 |
| 14 | "Ne damo te pismo naša" | 8 | 8 | 9 | 9 | 9 | 9 | 52 | 13 |
| 15 | "Lijepa Tena" | 9 | 10 | 9 | 10 | 8 | 9 | 55 | 15 |
| 16 | "Istina je" | 9 | 8 | 8 | 8 | 9 | 8 | 50 | 11 |

=== Promotion ===
Igor Cukrov and Andrea made several appearances across Europe to specifically promote "Lijepa Tena" as the Croatian Eurovision entry. On 7 March, Igor Cukrov and Andrea performed "Lijepa Tena" during the semi-final of the Serbian Eurovision national final Beovizija 2009. On 19 April, the duo appeared in and performed during the TV SLO1 programme Spet doma in Slovenia. On 24 April, Igor Cukrov and Andrea performed during the BHT 1 show Konačno petak in Bosnia and Herzegovina.

== At Eurovision ==
According to Eurovision rules, all nations with the exceptions of the host country and the "Big Four" (France, Germany, Spain and the United Kingdom) are required to qualify from one of two semi-finals in order to compete for the final; the top nine songs from each semi-final as determined by televoting progress to the final, and a tenth was determined by back-up juries. The European Broadcasting Union (EBU) split up the competing countries into six different pots based on voting patterns from previous contests, with countries with favourable voting histories put into the same pot. On 30 January 2009, a special allocation draw was held which placed each country into one of the two semi-finals. Croatia was placed into the second semi-final, to be held on 14 May 2009. The running order for the semi-finals was decided through another draw on 16 March 2009 and Croatia was set to open the show and perform in position 1, before the entry from Ireland.

The two semi-finals and the final were broadcast in Croatia on HRT with commentary by Duško Ćurlić. The Croatian spokesperson, who announced the Croatian votes during the final, was Mila Horvat.

=== Semi-final ===
Igor Cukrov and Andrea took part in technical rehearsals on 6 and 9 May, followed by dress rehearsals on 13 and 14 May. The Croatian performance featured Igor Cukrov dressed in a black suit and Andrea in a white dress. Cukrov's outfit was designed by the fashion brand Estare Culto, while Andrea's dress was designed by the fashion brand ELFS. The stage was dark with the LED screens projecting expanding blue flowers and a dancing couple. The performance also featured the use of a wind machine. Cukrov and Andrea were joined on stage by four backing vocalists dressed in black: Ivana Čabraja, Jelena Majić, Karmen Matković and Sanja Jukić.

At the end of the show, Croatia was announced as having qualified for the grand final. It was later revealed that Croatia was selected as the back-up jury qualifier after placing thirteenth in the semi-final, receiving a total of 33 points.

=== Final ===
Shortly after the second semi-final, a winners' press conference was held for the ten qualifying countries. As part of this press conference, the qualifying artists took part in a draw to determine the running order for the final. This draw was done in the order the countries appeared in the semi-final running order. Croatia was drawn to perform in position 5, following the entry from Sweden and before the entry from Portugal.

Igor Cukrov and Andrea once again took part in dress rehearsals on 15 and 16 May before the final, including the jury final where the professional juries cast their final votes before the live show. The duo performed a repeat of their semi-final performance during the final on 16 May. At the conclusion of the voting, Croatia finished in eighteenth place with 45 points.

=== Voting ===
The voting system for 2009 involved each country awarding points from 1–8, 10 and 12, with the points in the final being decided by a combination of 50% national jury and 50% televoting. Each nation's jury consisted of five music industry professionals who are citizens of the country they represent. This jury judged each entry based on: vocal capacity; the stage performance; the song's composition and originality; and the overall impression by the act. In addition, no member of a national jury was permitted to be related in any way to any of the competing acts in such a way that they cannot vote impartially and independently.

Following the release of the full split voting by the EBU after the conclusion of the competition, it was revealed that Croatia had placed sixteenth with the public televote and nineteenth with the jury vote in the final. In the public vote, Croatia scored 55 points, while with the jury vote, Croatia scored 58 points.

Below is a breakdown of points awarded to Croatia and awarded by Croatia in the second semi-final and grand final of the contest. The nation awarded its 12 points to Serbia in the semi-final and to Bosnia and Herzegovina in the final of the contest.

==== Points awarded to Croatia ====
Points awarded to Croatia (Semi-final 2)
| Score | Country |
|---|---|
| 12 points | Serbia |
| 10 points | Slovenia |
| 8 points | |
| 7 points | |
| 6 points | |
| 5 points | |
| 4 points | |
| 3 points | Moldova; Russia |
| 2 points | Cyprus |
| 1 point | Albania; Hungary; Ukraine |

Points awarded to Croatia (Final)
| Score | Country |
|---|---|
| 12 points | Bosnia and Herzegovina |
| 10 points | |
| 8 points | Montenegro |
| 7 points | |
| 6 points | Slovenia |
| 5 points | Azerbaijan; Serbia |
| 4 points | Macedonia |
| 3 points | |
| 2 points | Greece; Moldova |
| 1 point | Iceland |

==== Points awarded by Croatia ====
Points awarded by Croatia (Semi-final 2)
| Score | Country |
|---|---|
| 12 points | Serbia |
| 10 points | Albania |
| 8 points | Norway |
| 7 points | Slovenia |
| 6 points | Azerbaijan |
| 5 points | Moldova |
| 4 points | Estonia |
| 3 points | Greece |
| 2 points | Denmark |
| 1 point | Ireland |

Points awarded by Croatia (Final)
| Score | Country |
|---|---|
| 12 points | Bosnia and Herzegovina |
| 10 points | Azerbaijan |
| 8 points | Norway |
| 7 points | Greece |
| 6 points | Estonia |
| 5 points | Albania |
| 4 points | United Kingdom |
| 3 points | Moldova |
| 2 points | Iceland |
| 1 point | Turkey |

==== Detailed voting results ====
The following members comprised the Croatian jury:

- Tina Vukov – singer
- Silvije Glojnarić – conductor
- Doris Karamatić – academic musician, harpist
- Denis Vasilj – professor of music theory
- Darko Domitrović – composer

Detailed voting results from Croatia (Final)
| R/O | Country | Results | | | Points |
| R/O | Country | Jury | Televoting | Combined | Points |
|---|---|---|---|---|---|
| 01 | Lithuania | | | | |
| 02 | Israel | | | | |
| 03 | France | 2 | | 2 | |
| 04 | Sweden | | | | |
| 05 | Croatia | | | | |
| 06 | Portugal | | | | |
| 07 | Iceland | | 6 | 6 | 2 |
| 08 | Greece | 8 | 5 | 13 | 7 |
| 09 | Armenia | | | | |
| 10 | Russia | | | | |
| 11 | Azerbaijan | 10 | 7 | 17 | 10 |
| 12 | Bosnia and Herzegovina | 12 | 12 | 24 | 12 |
| 13 | Moldova | 4 | 3 | 7 | 3 |
| 14 | Malta | 1 | | 1 | |
| 15 | Estonia | 5 | 4 | 9 | 6 |
| 16 | Denmark | | | | |
| 17 | Germany | | | | |
| 18 | Turkey | 3 | 2 | 5 | 1 |
| 19 | Albania | | 8 | 8 | 5 |
| 20 | Norway | 6 | 10 | 16 | 8 |
| 21 | Ukraine | | | | |
| 22 | Romania | | | | |
| 23 | United Kingdom | 7 | 1 | 8 | 4 |
| 24 | Finland | | | | |
| 25 | Spain | | | | |
