= Martina Majerle =

Croatian singer (born 1980)

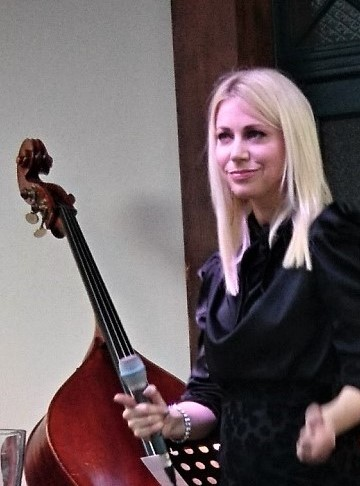
- Martina in 2020

Background information
- Born: 2 May 1980 (age 46); Rijeka, SR Croatia, SFR Yugoslavia
- Genres: Pop
- Occupation: Singer
- Instrument: Vocals
- Years active: 1997 - present
- Label: Majerle Music
- Member of: Quartissimo ∙ Atmospheric

Martina Majerle (born 2 May 1980) is a Croatian singer of Croatian descent but her grandfather was from Slovenia. Majerle represented Slovenia at the Eurovision Song Contest 2009 in Moscow, Russia with the string quartet Quartissimo with the song "Love Symphony". It competed in the second semi-final but failed to reach the final. Martina has also been a backing vocalist for several countries in various editions of the contest.

== Career in Croatia ==
She made her first serious steps into the world of music as the lead singer of the Rijeka band Putokazi. She continued her musical career as a soloist in the ambient-electro-pop band Atmospheric. Majerle made her debut at the Splitski Festival in 2011 with the song Neka se dogodi čudo. In 2013 Martina Majerle released a cover of Tony Esposito's song, Kalimba de Luna, together with Mr. B and Chrisma Project, as she was collaborating with them already on a song Caravan of Love. In 2017, at the Melodije Istre i Kvarnera Festival, she won third place by the audience, with a song Teče teče Rečina, while a year later, at the same festival, she performed the song Na Trsatu, which won the second audience award. She won the award for the best interpretation in 2018 for the song Međimurska voda sveta performed at the MEF - Međimurski Festival, respectively.

At the Čansonfest in Kastav, Croatia, in 2018, she performed a song More j' z morun, which won third place, according to the professional jury. In 2019 she was awarded for the best interpretation, with a song Leja le lej, at the same festival. Martina is a member of the Croatian RTV orchestra and is involved in all the big projects regarding the Croatian national broadcaster, just as The Voice, A strana, Singing with the Stars, Dora and Porin.

In 2020, Majerle performed at the prestigious Croatian festival Večeri dalmatinske šansone, in Šibenik, Croatia, where she performed her new single Volin Kad Si Tu, where she achieved an honourable third place, by the professional jury. Her single 'Volin Kad Si Tu' was officially released on September 20, 2020. Her recent single Dajen ti besedu was released on the digital platforms, on September 30, but performed for the first time at the Melodije Istre i Kvarnera Festival 2020, together with Klapa Tić, winning third place by the audience. Both her singles, released in 2020, were released through her own record label, Majerle Music.

In May 2021, Majerle represented Croatia at the annual Albanian music competition Kënga Magjike, she performed her song Vrijeme je na našoj strani.

As a backing vocalist Martina performed at many concerts at home and abroad. She accompanied many famous musicians, amongst them were Oliver Dragojević in Royal Albert Hall (London), Tereza Kesovija in Olympia (Paris), Zdravko Čolić in Olympia (Paris), US tour, Australian tour, Severina, Massimo Savić, Nina Badrić, Toni Cetinski, Doris Dragović, Radojka Šverko, Maja Blagdan, as well as bands Novi Fosili, Parni Valjak etc.

== Eurovision Song Contest ==
Martina has performed at the Eurovision Song Contest eight times: in 2003 with the Croatian representative Claudia Beni, in 2007 with the Slovene representative Alenka Gotar, in 2008 with the Montenegrin representative Stefan Filipović, in 2009 as a lead singer with the string quartet Quartissimo with the song "Love Symphony", in 2011 with the Slovene representative Maja Keuc, in 2012 with the Slovene representative Eva Boto, in 2014 with the Montenegrin representative Sergej Ćetković, and in 2016 with the Croatian representative Nina Kraljić.

== Career in Slovenia ==
In 2009, Martina Majerle, in collaboration with Quartissimo, emerged victorious in the Slovenian national selection for Eurovision Song Contest, EMA 2009, triumphing with their composition titled "Love Symphony," consequently securing the honor of representing Slovenia at the Eurovision 2009 held in Moscow, Russia.

In 2013 Martina Majerle successfully collaborated with Slovene songwriter Dare Kaurič, with whom she released several songs in Slovenian, just as Čokolada in vanilija, Luna nad obalo and Rain In The Desert (Mr. Darwin Chill). In 2015, she competed at the Slovenian preselection EMA 2015, for the Eurovision Song Contest, with a song Alive.

In 2018, Majerle collaborated with POP TV on the Slovenian edition of Strictly Come Dancing, as a singer.

In 2022, Martina Majerle announced that she will be a part of Slovenian edition of Your Face Sounds Familiar.

In 2023, Martina Majerle collaborated with Dare Kaurič on his album "Muzika za ples," contributing her vocals alongside Dare in the track titled "Koliba iz bambusa."

== Singles ==
Title	Year	Album
"Love Symphony (feat. Quartissimo)"	2009	non-album song
"Kalimba de Luna (feat. Chrisma Project, Mr. B)"	2010	non-album song
"Caravan of Love (feat. Chrisma Project, Mr. B)"	2010	non-album song
"Neka se dogodi čudo"	2011	non-album song
"Čokolada in Vanilija (feat. Dare Kaurič)"	2012	non-album song
"Luna nad obalo"	2013	non-album song
"Alive"	2015	non-album song
"Teče, teče rečina"	2017	non-album song
"Na Trsatu"	2018	non-album song
"Međimurska voda sveta"	2018	non-album song
"More j' z morun"	2018	non-album song
"Leja le lej"	2019	non-album song
"Rain In The Desert"	2019	non-album song
"Volin kad si tu"	2020	non-album song
"Dajen ti besedu (feat. Klapa Tić)"	2020	non-album song
"Vrijeme je na našoj strani"	2021	non-album song
"Sebi dovoljan (feat. Matija Dedić)"	2021	non-album song
"Stori malo mesta za me"	2023	non-album song
"Oblak (feat. Sandro Bastiančić)"	2024	non-album song

Awards and achievements
Preceded by Rebeka Dremelj with "Vrag naj vzame"	Slovenia in the Eurovision Song Contest; 2009 (with Quartissimo)	Succeeded by Ansambel Roka Žlindre and Kalamari with "Narodnozabavni rock"
