= Kalamari (band) =

Slovenian musical group

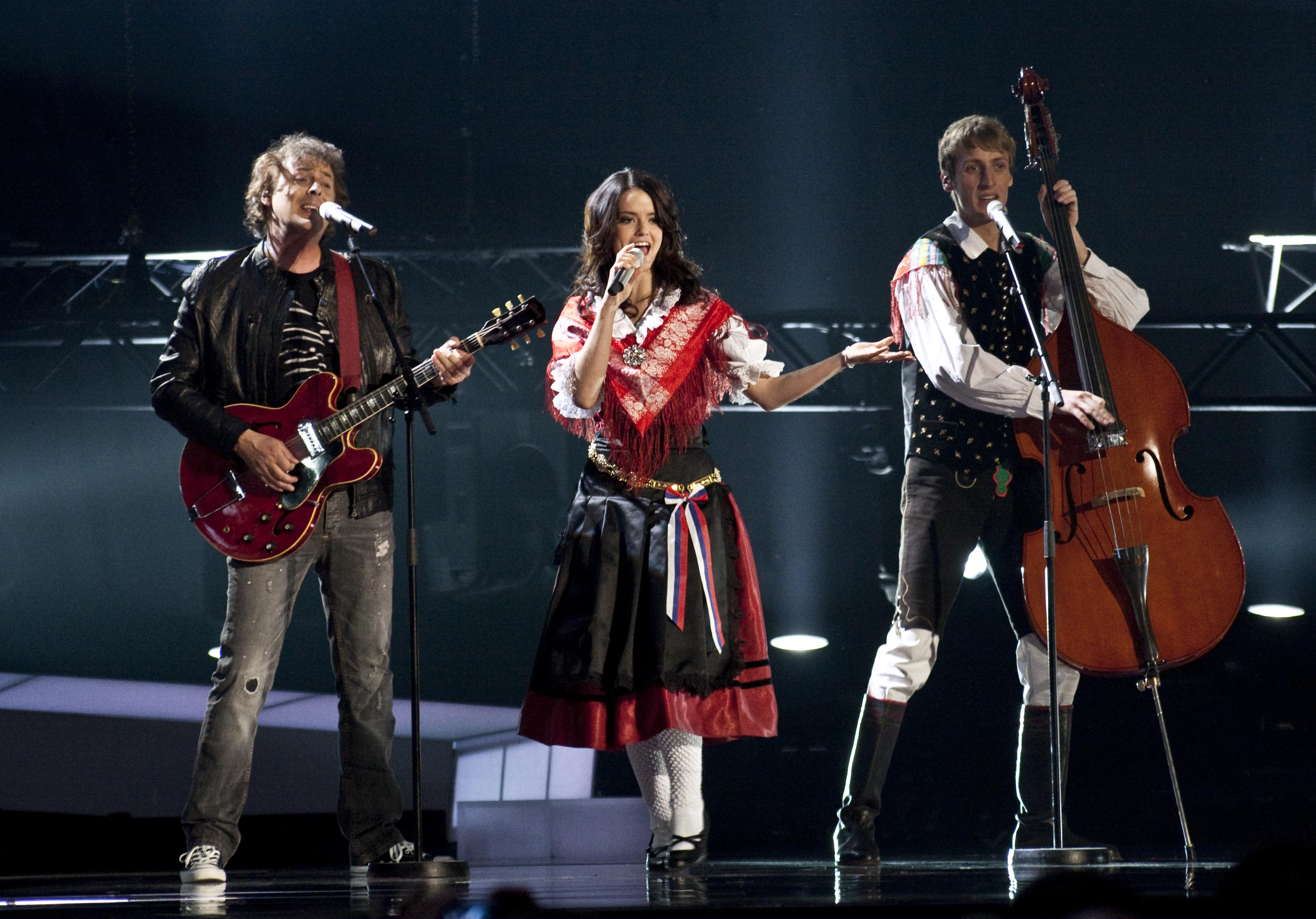
- Matjaž Švagelj (left) of Kalamari performing with Barbara Ogrinc and Rok Modic of Roka Žlindre at Eurovision Song Contest 2010.

Kalamari is a Slovene musical group consisting of Jože Jež Pepi, Matjaž Švagelj, Boštjan Tršar, and Egon Prinčič.

== Eurovision 2010 ==
Together with Roka Žlindre, Kalamari represented Slovenia in the Eurovision Song Contest 2010 with the song "Narodnozabavni rock". Of Kalamari's four members, only Jože Jež Pepi and Matjaž Švagelj performed at Eurovision.

They failed to qualify for the final of the 2010 Eurovision Song Contest, as they reached 16th place (out of 17).

Preceded by Quartissimo feat. Martina with "Love Symphony"	Slovenia in the Eurovision Song Contest; 2010 (with Roka Žlindre)	Succeeded by Maja Keuc with "No One"
