= Elektra (band) =

Icelandic pop rock band

Elektra is a pop rock band from Iceland formed in 2009.

== History ==
Elektra is an all-female band from Reykjavík. The lead singer is Nana Alfreds. Their manager is Valgeir Magnússon.

In February 2009, with the song "Got No Love", they finished third in the national selection for Eurovision Song Contest. This single was number 1 in Iceland.

== Members ==
- Nana: guitar, vocals
- Brynhildur: guitar, vocals
- Eva: bass guitar, vocals
- Linda: keyboards, vocals
- Dísa: drums

== Discography ==
=== Albums ===
- Sísí (2009)
- Cobra on Heels (2010)

=== Singles ===
- "Got no Love"
- "Sísí (Fríkar út)"
- "I Don't Do Boys"
- "Komdu Aftur"
- "Cobra on Heels"
