= Maja Keuc =

Slovenian singer

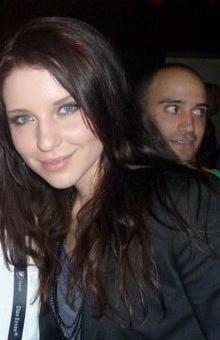
- Maja Keuc

Background information
- Also known as: Amaya
- Born: 16 January 1992 (age 34); Maribor, Slovenia
- Genres: Pop; soul; R&B; electronic
- Occupation: Singer
- Instrument: Vocals
- Years active: 2010–present

Maja Keuc (born 16 January 1992), also known as Amaya, is a Slovenian singer. She represented Slovenia in the Eurovision Song Contest 2011.

== Career ==
Keuc was born on 16 January 1992 in Maribor, Slovenia. During her childhood, she joined the "English student theatre" where she got a lot of stage experience including singing, dancing and playing instruments. In 2010, Maja competed in the talent show Slovenija ima talent (Slovenia's Got Talent) and finished as runner-up behind then-seven-year-old singer Lina Kuduzović.

She represented Slovenia at the Eurovision Song Contest 2011 with the song "No One" eventually finishing 13th in the grand final. She finished 3rd in the second semi-final with 113 points. Had jury votes only been used, she would have finished 1st (ranked 3rd in the televote) in semi-final and 4th in the final (22nd in the televote).

She released her second studio album Fairytales in September 2016, under the name Amaya.

== Personal life ==
Keuc was engaged to Swedish band Dirty Loops vocalist Jonah Nilsson, but they later separated. She lives in Stockholm, Sweden.

== Discography ==
=== Studio albums ===
- Indigo (2011)
- Fairytales (2016)

=== Singles ===
- No One (2011)
- Zmorem (2011)
- You're a Tree and I'm a Balloon (2011)
- Get The Party Started (2011)
- Go with the Flow (2011)
- Ta planet (2011)
- Na pol poti (2011)
- Krog (2011)
- Ta čas (2012)
- Tako lepo mi je (2012)
- Close to You (2014)
- Statements (2017)
- Concrete (2018)
- Trust Issues (2020)
- Sleep Alone (2021)

Preceded by Ansambel Roka Žlindre and Kalamari with "Narodnozabavni rock"	Slovenia in the Eurovision Song Contest; 2011	Succeeded by Eva Boto with "Verjamem"
