= Quartissimo =

- Origin: Slovenia
- Genres: Classical music, Pop & Rock
- Years active: 2009-2011
- Website: Official website

Quartissimo was a Slovenian string quartet featuring Žiga Cerar on first violin, Matjaž Bogataj on second violin, Luka Dukarić on viola, and Samo Dervišić on cello. The group's name is a portmanteau of quartet and the Italian suffix -issimo, which means extremely (e.g., fortissimo, prestissimo).

The young but established musicians have experience as soloists and members of chamber orchestras, including the Slovene Philharmonic Orchestra. All have had formal training in violin.

== Career ==
The group represented Slovenia at the Eurovision Song Contest in 2009 with the song Love Symphony, but failed to qualify for the final. The composer and lyricist of the song is Andrej Babić, whose songs have represented four countries at Eurovision: Croatia in 2003, Bosnia-Herzegovina in 2005, Slovenia in 2007, and Portugal in 2008. Originally, the crossover song "Love Symphony" was written as an instrumental, but because Eurovision rules require all entries to have lyrics, a guest female vocal was added to the song. The lead vocalist, Martina Majerle, was backing vocalist for Croatia in 2003, Slovenia in 2007, and Montenegro in 2008.

== Group members ==
Žiga Cerar

Žiga Cerar was born on 27 April 1978 in Ljubljana, Slovenia. He started to learn violin at the age of eight, at the Franc Šturm Musical School in Ljubljana. He continued his musical studies at a secondary musical school in Ljubljana. After graduating from secondary school, he was accepted to the Mozarteum University of Salzburg, Austria. After receiving his college degree, Cerar also completed a master's degree.

Cerar won numerous awards at national and international competitions. During his studies, he regularly attended various summer schools and seminars with numerous distinguished professors.

Between 2002 and 2004, Cerar was a member of the Cologne Chamber Orchestra and toured several European cities.

Cerar is a member of a multiple chamber orchestras. He was the founder of the Octissimo String Octet, which had many successful concerts in Slovenia and abroad.

Since 2004, Cerar has been employed in the Slovene Philharmonic Orchestra. For the last two years, he has been a member of the Slovene Philharmonics chamber string orchestra.

Matjaž Bogataj

Matjaž Bogataj, born 1987, is a student at the University of Music and Performing Arts, Graz. He has performed at more than 200 concerts, either as a soloist or as a member of chamber groups and orchestras.

Bogataj has studied in master classes with famous names from throughout the world of classical music.

Bogataj won awards at seven international and two national musical competitions. He achieved his latest success at the First World Violin Competition for Young Violinists in Honour of Stefan Milenkovich, where he was the runner-up.

In June and July 2008, he was one of the scholarship holders at the International Santanader Music Festival (Spain), where he performed soloist recitals and toured Spain and Paris with chamber groups and orchestras. At the conclusion of the event, Bogataj was invited for a second consecutive master class with the Vienna Philharmonic, which takes place every summer in Trenta, Slovenia. After finishing the course, Bogataj was chosen as one of the soloists who showcased his musical abilities at the famous Musikverein in Vienna.

Luka Dukarić

Luka Dukarić was born on 9 September 1986 in Ljubljana, Slovenia. He started his musical education at the age of eight, at Ljubljana's Moste-Polje Musical School. After finishing this school, he continued studying, first at the Secondary Musical and Ballet School in Ljubljana and later at the Academy of Music.

Dukarić won a gold medal in 2000 and 2003 in regional competitions, a bronze plaque in 2000, and a gold plaque in 2003 (when he was also the runner-up) at the national violin competition. At the international competition for young violinists in Gorica, Slovenia, in 2001, he won an award. At the Vladimir Lovec-Ivan Šček chamber group competition, Dukarić won a third place award and two special awards.

For three years, Dukarić was a member of the Young Musicians International Symphony Orchestra and performed in many European countries. In 2006, he became a member of the international orchestra Animato Academy. Dukarić performed at the 51st Summer Festival held at Ljubljana Castle in 2003.

Samo Dervišić

Samo Dervišić was born on 12 December 1981 in Ljubljana, Slovenia. He started playing violoncello at the age of five, at the Franc Šturm Musical School. He continued his musical education at the Secondary Musical and Ballet School in Ljubljana. After graduating, he successfully passed his entrance examination to the Academy of Music of the University of Ljubljana.

From 2002 to 2007, Dervišić taught violoncello at various musical schools in Slovenia.

Awards and achievements
| Preceded by Rebeka Dremelj with "Vrag naj vzame" | Slovenia in the Eurovision Song Contest; 2009 (with Martina Majerle) | Succeeded by Ansambel Roka Žlindre and Kalamari with "Narodnozabavni rock" |
