= ZKP RTVS =

Založba kaset in plošč RTV Slovenija company logo

Založba kaset in plošč RTV Slovenija or Založba kaset in plošč Radiotelevizije Slovenija (acronym ZKP RTVS, meaning "Publishing and Record Label RTV Slovenia" in Slovene) is a major Slovenian record label, based in Ljubljana. It was founded under the name Založba kaset in plošč RTV Ljubljana and renamed in 1990. It is the music production branch of the national broadcaster Radiotelevizija Slovenija.

== Production and distribution ==
After RTV Ljubljana officially became DO RTV Slovenija on April 24, 1990, the label began branding their cassette tapes and vinyl record products with ZKP, RTV Slovenija while retaining the old ZKP RTVL logo. The new ZKP RTVS label logo was introduced in the second half of 1990, often appearing together with the old RTVL logo on cassettes until the end of 1990. On vinyl releases pressed by Jugoton, the RTVL logo was used until early 1991.

== Artists ==
Some of the artist that are signed to ZKP RTVS include:

- Janez Bončina Benč
- Jernej Jung
- Nude (Slovenian band)
- Dan D
- Niet
- Elevators (Slovenian band)
- Avtomobili
- Skalp
- Eva Boto
- Mi2
- Same Babe
- Aynee
- Društvo Mrtvih Pesnikov
- Panda
- Orlek
- Pankrti
- Kalamari
- Monika Pučelj
- Hiša
- Faraoni
