= Slovenia in the Eurovision Song Contest 2009 =

- Eurovision Song Contest 2009
- Participating broadcaster: Radiotelevizija Slovenija (RTVSLO)
- Country: Slovenia
- Selection process: Evrovizijska Melodija 2009
- Selection date: 1 February 2009

Competing entry
- Song: "Love Symphony"
- Artist: Quartissimo feat. Martina
- Songwriters: Andrej Babić; Aleksandar Valenčić

Placement
- Semi-final result: Failed to qualify (16th)

Participation chronology

Slovenia was represented at the Eurovision Song Contest 2009 with the song "Love Symphony" written by Andrej Babić and Aleksandar Valenčić, and performed by the group Quartissimo featuring Martina. The Slovene participating broadcaster, Radiotelevizija Slovenija (RTVSLO), organised the national final Evrovizijska Melodija 2009 in order to select its entry for the contest. 20 entries competed in the national final which consisted of two shows: a semi-final and a final. Fourteen of the entries competed in the semi-final and the top eight entries were selected to advance alongside six pre-qualified songs following the combination of votes from a three-member jury panel and a public televote. Fourteen entries qualified to compete in the final where "Love Symphony" performed by Quartissimo and Martina Majerle was selected as the winner following the combination of votes from a three-member jury panel and a public televote.

Slovenia was drawn to compete in the second semi-final of the Eurovision Song Contest which took place on 14 May 2009. Performing during the show in position 10, "Love Symphony" was not announced among the 10 qualifying entries of the second semi-final and therefore did not qualify to compete in the final. It was later revealed that Slovenia placed sixteenth out of the 19 participating countries in the semi-final with 14 points.

== Background ==
Prior to the 2009 contest, Radiotelevizija Slovenija (RTVSLO) had participated in the Eurovision Song Contest representing Slovenia fourteen times since its first entry in 1993. Its highest placing in the contest, to this point, has been seventh place, achieved on two occasions: in 1995 with the song "Prisluhni mi" performed by Darja Švajger and in 2001 with the song "Energy" performed by Nuša Derenda. The country's only other top ten result was achieved in 1997 when Tanja Ribič performing "Zbudi se" placed tenth. Since the introduction of semi-finals to the format of the contest in 2004, Slovenia had thus far only managed to qualify to the final on one occasion. In 2008, "Vrag naj vzame" performed by Rebeka Dremelj failed to qualify to the final.

As part of its duties as participating broadcaster, RTVSLO organises the selection of its entry in the Eurovision Song Contest and broadcasts the event in the country. The broadcaster confirmed its participation in the 2009 contest on 14 September 2008. RTVSLO has traditionally selected its entry through a national final entitled Evrovizijska Melodija (EMA), which has been produced with variable formats. For 2009, the broadcaster opted to organise Evrovizijska Melodija 2009 (EMA 2009) to select its entry.

== Before Eurovision ==
=== EMA 2009 ===
The logo of EMA 2009

EMA 2009 was the 14th edition of the Slovenian national final format Evrovizijska Melodija (EMA). The competition was used by RTV Slovenija to select Slovenia's entry for the Eurovision Song Contest 2009, and consisted of two shows that took place on 31 January 2009 and 1 February 2009. Both shows of the competition took place at the RTV Slovenija Studio 1 in Ljubljana, hosted by Peter Poles and Maja Martina Merljak and were broadcast on TV SLO 1 and online via the broadcaster's website rtvslo.si.

==== Format ====
The format of the competition consisted of two televised shows: a semi-final held on 31 January 2009 and a final held on 1 February 2009. Fourteen songs competed in the semi-final and the 50/50 combination of points from a three-member expert jury and a public televote selected eight finalists to proceed to the final alongside an additional six pre-qualified finalists. Fourteen songs competed in the final where the 50/50 combination of points from a three-member expert jury and a public televote determined the winner. During both shows, each member of the expert jury assigned a score of 1 (lowest score) to 10 (highest score) to each song with the combination of the jury votes creating an overall ranking from which points were converted and assigned as follows: 1-8, 10 and 12. The televote also assigned points as follows: 1-8, 10 and 12, with the results being determined when the votes were combined.

The jury that voted during the two shows consisted of:

- Urška Čop Šmajgert (Slovenia) – music editor for Radio Maribor
- Andrea Zuppini (Italy) – composer and arranger
- Anja Rogljić (Serbia) – Head of the Serbian delegation at the Eurovision Song Contest

==== Competing entries ====
Artists and composers were able to submit their entries to the broadcaster between 11 October 2008 and 28 November 2008. 113 entries were received by the broadcaster during the submission period. An expert committee consisting of Darja Švajger (1995 and 1999 Slovenian Eurovision entrant), Jernej Vene (music editor for Radio Val 202) and Mojca Menart (Head of ZKP RTV Slovenija) selected fourteen artists and songs for the semi-final of the competition from the received submissions, while the six pre-qualifying songs for the final were written by composers nominated by the entertainment programme of RTV Slovenija based on their success on EMA in recent years and Slovenian charts and directly invited by the broadcaster for the competition: Aleš Klinar, Boštjan Grabnar, Jan Plestenjak, Jože Potrebuješ, Matjaž Vlašič and former Slovenian Eurovision contestant Omar Naber who represented Slovenia in 2005. The composers also selected the performer for their entry. The competing artists were announced on 3 December 2008. Among the competing artists were former Slovenian Eurovision contestants Karmen Stavec who represented Slovenia in 2003 and Omar Naber.

Artist	Song	Songwriter(s)	Selection
Alya and Rudi	"Zadnji dan"	Jan Plestenjak	Invited by RTVSLO
Aynee	"Zdaj vem"	Simona Černetič, Miha Gorše	Open submission
Bjonde	"Blond Power"	Gorazd Sedmak, Gaber Radojevič	Open submission
Brigita Šuler	"Druga liga"	Boštjan Groznik, Werner Brozovič	Open submission
Čuki	"Mal' naprej pa mal' nazaj"	Jože Potrebuješ, Marino Marcela	Invited by RTVSLO
Eva Černe	"Vse"	Boštjan Grabnar, Damjana Kenda Hussu	Invited by RTVSLO
Gianni Rijavec	"Gloria"	Leon Oblak, Gianni Rijavec	Open submission
Karmen Stavec	"A si želiš"	Rafael Artesero, Gregor Bezenšek	Open submission
Krema	"Ob meni si"	Janko Marinč, Roman Milavec, Dejan Markič	Open submission
Langa and Manca Špik	"Zaigraj muzikant"	Urša Vlašič, Matjaž Vlašič, Boštjan Grabnar	Invited by RTVSLO
Lea Sirk	"Znamenje iz sanj"	Patrik Greblo, Damjana Kenda Hussu, Sašo Fajon	Open submission
Mitja	"Mission"	Aleš Berkopec, Primož Velikonja, Damjan Berkopec, Mitja Šedlbauer, Nejc Viher	Open submission
Ne me jugat and Slavko Ivančič	"Kaj me briga"	Enkrat Se Živi, Mitja Kodarin, Gaber Radojevič	Open submission
Nexys	"Vsaj za en dan"	Anton Valenčak, Ines Mohorko, Anton Valenčak	Open submission
Nuška Drašček	"Kako lepo"	Duško Rapotec, Rok Terkaj, Ivan Popeskič	Open submission
Omar Naber	"I Still Carry On"	Omar Naber, Miha Gorše, Rok Golob	Invited by RTVSLO
Petra Slapar	"Skrivnost"	Daniela Bervar, Žiga Pirnat	Open submission
Quartissimo (Note: Features uncredited vocals by Martina Majerle)	"Love Symphony"	Andrej Babić, Aleksandar Valenčić	Open submission
Samuel Lucas	"Vse bi zate dal"	Anja Rupel, Aleš Klinar, Franci Zabukovec	Invited by RTVSLO
Tadeja Molan and Retro Beat	"Sanje"	Tadeja Molan, Retro Beat	Open submission

==== Semi-final ====
The semi-final of EMA 2009 took place on 31 January 2009. In addition to the performances of the competing entries, 1995 and 1999 Slovenian Eurovision entrant Darja Švajger and 2007 Slovenian Eurovision entrant Alenka Gotar performed as guests. Eight entries were selected to proceed to the final based on the combination of points from a three-member jury panel and a public televote.

Semi-final – 31 January 2009
R/O	Artist	Song	Jury	Televote		Total	Place
R/O	Artist	Song	Jury	Votes	Points	Total	Place
1	Nexys	"Vsaj za en dan"	3	1,566	5	8	8
2	Petra Slapar	"Skrivnost"	0	1,054	1	1	13
3	Lea Sirk	"Znamenje iz sanj"	10	835	0	10	5
4	Brigita Šuler	"Druga liga"	0	3,074	10	10	6
5	Ne me jugat and Slavko Ivančič	"Kaj me briga"	5	2,922	8	13	4
6	Gianni Rijavec	"Gloria"	0	1,333	4	4	11
7	Aynee	"Zdaj vem"	0	896	0	0	14
8	Krema	"Ob meni si"	4	1,023	0	4	9
9	Quartissimo	"Love Symphony"	12	3,372	12	24	1
10	Tadeja Molan and Retro Beat	"Sanje"	1	893	0	1	12
11	Bjonde	"Blond Power"	6	1,312	3	9	7
12	Karmen Stavec	"A si želiš"	7	2,466	7	14	3
13	Nuška Drašček	"Kako lepo"	8	2,023	6	14	2
14	Mitja	"Mission"	2	1,144	2	4	10

==== Final ====
The final of EMA 2009 took place on 1 February 2009. The eight entries that qualified from the semi-final alongside the six pre-qualified entries competed. In addition to the performances of the competing entries, 2008 Slovenian Eurovision entrant Rebeka Dremelj, 2008 Eurovision winner Dima Bilan, Natalija Verboten, Helena Blagne and 4 tenor performed as guests. The combination of points from a three-member jury panel and a public televote selected "Love Symphony" performed by Quartissimo as the winner.

Final – 1 February 2009
R/O	Artist	Song	Jury	Televote		Total	Place
R/O	Artist	Song	Jury	Votes	Points	Total	Place
1	Lea Sirk	"Znamenje iz sanj"	5	1,048	0	5	9
2	Čuki	"Mal' naprej pa mal' nazaj"	0	8,411	10	10	7
3	Quartissimo	"Love Symphony"	12	5,089	7	19	1
4	Omar Naber	"I Still Carry On"	8	7,400	8	16	2
5	Brigita Šuler	"Druga liga"	0	2,301	0	0	13
6	Ne me jugat and Slavko Ivančič	"Kaj me briga"	6	3,240	4	10	6
7	Eva Černe	"Vse"	1	2,996	2	3	11
8	Karmen Stavec	"A si želiš"	4	2,815	1	5	10
9	Alya and Rudi	"Zadnji dan"	7	4,366	6	13	4
10	Bjonde	"Blond Power"	2	1,762	0	2	12
11	Samuel Lucas	"Vse bi zate dal"	10	3,037	3	13	3
12	Nexys	"Vsaj za en dan"	0	2,448	0	0	13
13	Langa and Manca Špik	"Zaigraj muzikant"	0	22,294	12	12	5
14	Nuška Drašček	"Kako lepo"	3	3,551	5	8	8

==== Ratings ====
Viewing figures by show
Show	Air date	Viewing figures		Ref.
Show	Air date	Nominal	Share	Ref.
Semi-final	31 January 2009	313,000	17.2%	
Final	1 February 2009	450,000	24.6%	

=== Promotion ===
Quartissimo and Martina made several appearances across Europe to specifically promote "Love Symphony" as the Slovenian Eurovision entry. On 1 March, Quartissimo and Martina appeared during the Bosnian song presentation show BH Eurosong 2009 where they performed the Slovene version of "Love Symphony", entitled "Simfonija". On 7 March, the artists performed "Love Symphony" during the semi-final of the Serbian Eurovision national final Beovizija 2009. On 18 April, Quartissimo and Martina performed during the Eurovision Promo Concert event which was held at the Amsterdam Marcanti venue in Amsterdam, Netherlands and hosted by Marcha and Maggie MacNeal.

== At Eurovision ==
According to Eurovision rules, all nations with the exceptions of the host country and the "Big Four" (France, Germany, Spain and the United Kingdom) are required to qualify from one of two semi-finals in order to compete for the final; the top nine songs from each semi-final as determined by televoting progress to the final, and a tenth was determined by back-up juries. The European Broadcasting Union (EBU) split up the competing countries into six different pots based on voting patterns from previous contests, with countries with favourable voting histories put into the same pot. On 30 January 2009, an allocation draw was held which placed each country into one of the two semi-finals. Slovenia was placed into the second semi-final, to be held on 14 May 2009. The running order for the semi-finals was decided through another draw on 16 March 2009 and Slovenia was set to perform in position 10, following the entry from Denmark and before the entry from Hungary.

In Slovenia, the semi-finals and the final were televised on RTV Slovenija with commentary by Andrej Hofer. The Slovenian spokesperson, who announced the Slovenian votes during the final, was Peter Poles.

=== Semi-final ===
Quartissimo and Martina took in technical rehearsals on 6 and 9 May, followed by dress rehearsals on 13 and 14 May. The Slovenian performance began with Quartissimo and Martina behind white decorated canvases showing their shades followed by the members of Quartissimo tearing down their canvases from the frames, appearing on the stage in black suits playing string instruments. Martina, who wore a long white dress, remained behind the white canvas and performed the first verse of the song in Slovene. In the second part of the performance, Martina tore down her canvas and stepped forward to the stage. The LED screens displayed images of musical notes and strings of a violin on a black background. The creative director for the Slovenian performance was Miha Alujevič. The backing vocalist that joined Quartissimo and Martina on stage was Sandra Feketija.

At the end of the show, Slovenia was not announced among the top 10 entries in the second semi-final and therefore failed to qualify to compete in the final. It was later revealed that Slovenia placed sixteenth in the semi-final, receiving a total of 14 points.

=== Voting ===
The voting system for 2009 involved each country awarding points from 1-8, 10 and 12, with the points in the final being decided by a combination of 50% national jury and 50% televoting. Each nation's jury consisted of five music industry professionals who are citizens of the country they represent. This jury judged each entry based on: vocal capacity; the stage performance; the song's composition and originality; and the overall impression by the act. In addition, no member of a national jury was permitted to be related in any way to any of the competing acts in such a way that they cannot vote impartially and independently.

Below is a breakdown of points awarded to Slovenia and awarded by Slovenia in the second semi-final and grand final of the contest. The nation awarded its 12 points to Serbia in the semi-final and to Norway in the final of the contest.

==== Points awarded to Slovenia ====
Points awarded to Slovenia (Semi-final 2)
Score	Country
12 points	
10 points	
8 points	
7 points	Croatia
6 points	
5 points	Serbia
4 points	
3 points	
2 points	Albania
1 point	

==== Points awarded by Slovenia ====
Points awarded by Slovenia (Semi-final 2)
Score	Country
12 points	Serbia
10 points	Croatia
8 points	Norway
7 points	Albania
6 points	Azerbaijan
5 points	Denmark
4 points	Greece
3 points	Moldova
2 points	Ireland
1 point	Estonia

Points awarded by Slovenia (Final)
Score	Country
12 points	Norway
10 points	Bosnia and Herzegovina
8 points	Denmark
7 points	France
6 points	Croatia
5 points	Iceland
4 points	Greece
3 points	United Kingdom
2 points	Albania
1 point	Azerbaijan

==== Detailed voting results ====
The following members comprised the Slovene jury:

- Anžej Dežan – singer, represented Slovenia in the 2006 contest
- Nuša Derenda – singer, represented Slovenia in the 2001 contest
- Matjaž Vlašič – composer of the 1998, 2005 and 2006 Slovene contest entries
- Aida Kurtović – producer
- Dušan Hren – director

Detailed voting results from Slovenia (Final)
R/O	Country	Results			Points
R/O	Country	Jury	Televoting	Combined	Points
01	Lithuania				
02	Israel				
03	France	10		10	7
04	Sweden	2		2	
05	Croatia		8	8	6
06	Portugal				
07	Iceland	4	4	8	5
08	Greece	5	3	8	4
09	Armenia	1		1	
10	Russia				
11	Azerbaijan		6	6	1
12	Bosnia and Herzegovina	8	12	20	10
13	Moldova	3		3	
14	Malta				
15	Estonia		2	2	
16	Denmark	6	5	11	8
17	Germany				
18	Turkey				
19	Albania		7	7	2
20	Norway	12	10	22	12
21	Ukraine				
22	Romania				
23	United Kingdom	7	1	8	3
24	Finland				
25	Spain				
