= Televoting =

Decision-making and opinion polling conducted by telephone

Televoting (also telephone voting, phone voting, and call-in voting) is a method of decision making and opinion polling conducted by telephone. Televoting can also extend to voting by SMS text message via a mobile cell phone.

== Broadcast contest televoting ==
Televoting involves broadcasters providing an audience with different telephone numbers associated with contestants participating; the outcome is decided by the number of calls to each line. Televotes are most commonly used to determine weekly results in reality competitions, such as Big Brother, Dancing with the Stars / Strictly Come Dancing, The Voice, Idol, and The X Factor franchises.

In 1997, the Eurovision Song Contest began to phase in public televoting to determine its winner, with a mass rollout beginning in 1998. Initially, televotes completely replaced the previous system, in which entries were scored by regional juries. These changes led to the increased prominence of "bloc voting"—in which a country's voting pattern would commonly favour neighbouring nations (such as Scandinavian, Baltic, Balkan, and CIS countries), and countries with similar cultures (UK and Ireland). From 2009 to 2015, most countries used a 50/50 split between a jury and televoting results. Since 2016, most countries still use a televoting process and a jury to determine the results, the votes are no longer combined and instead treated separately.

== Deliberative democracy televoting ==
A televote is initiated by random sampling of a population by means of random digit dialling. Those contacted are requested to volunteer to receive written background briefing materials regarding a particular issue, that have been prepared by a panel of representatives of different stakeholder groups affected by that issue, and incorporating various views or perspectives. Volunteers are requested to discuss the issue amongst their families and friends until they have reached a decision. At the conclusion of this period they are polled again by telephone in order to determine their views.

=== Advantages of televoting ===
Televoting is a more cost-effective method of democratic deliberation than many alternatives such as deliberative polling, as it does not require the participants to meet in person.

Common to other deliberative democratic techniques, it also tends to produce more reasoned decisions than "raw" opinion polling, because participants are exposed to various perspectives other than their own in the briefing materials that they receive.

=== Disadvantages of televoting ===
Televoting may be less effective than other methods of democratic deliberation in which a trained moderator or facilitator is available in person to ensure that groups seriously deliberate on the issue before them.

== See also ==
- Deliberative democracy
- Online deliberation
