= Slovakia in the Eurovision Song Contest 2012 =

- Eurovision Song Contest 2012
- Participating broadcaster: Rozhlas a televízia Slovenska (RTVS)
- Country: Slovakia
- Selection process: Internal selection
- Announcement date: 7 March 2012

Competing entry
- Song: "Don't Close Your Eyes"
- Artist: Max Jason Mai
- Songwriters: Miroslav Šmajda

Placement
- Semi-final result: Failed to qualify (18th)

Participation chronology

Slovakia was represented at the Eurovision Song Contest 2012 with the song "Don't Close Your Eyes" written and performed by Max Jason Mai. The Slovak participating broadcaster, Rozhlas a televízia Slovenska (RTVS), internally selected its entry for the contest. The song and Max Jason Mai were announced and presented to the public on 7 March 2012.

Slovakia was drawn to compete in the second semi-final of the Eurovision Song Contest which took place on 12 May 2012. Performing during the show in position 5, "Don't Close Your Eyes" was not announced among the top 10 entries of the second semi-final and therefore did not qualify to compete in the final. It was later revealed that Slovakia placed eighteenth (last) out of the 18 participating countries in the semi-final with 22 points.

As of 2026, this was Slovakia's last entry in the contest, before the country withdrew the following year. The absence has continued in every edition since.

== Background ==
Prior to the 2012 contest, Slovenská televízia (STV) until 2010 and Rozhlas a televízia Slovenska (RTVS) in 2011 had participated in the Eurovision Song Contest representing Slovakia six times since STV's first entry in 1994. Their best placing in the contest was eighteenth, achieved in 1996 with the song "Kým nás máš" performed by Marcel Palonder. Following the introduction of semi-finals in 2004, Slovakia had yet to feature in a final. It achieved its least successful result in 2009, where it returned to the contest and failed to qualify to the final with the song "Leť tmou" performed by Kamil Mikulčík and Nela Pocisková. In 2011, "I'm Still Alive" performed by Twiins failed to qualify to the final.

As part of its duties as participating broadcaster, RTVS organises the selection of its entry in the Eurovision Song Contest and broadcasts the event in the country. STV had used both national finals and internal selections to select its Eurovision entries. RTVS confirmed its intentions to participate in the 2012 contest on 20 December 2011 following rumours that it would not be participating due to financial reasons and in order to focus on other shows. In January 2012, the broadcaster announced it would select its entry internally.

== Before Eurovision ==
=== Internal selection ===
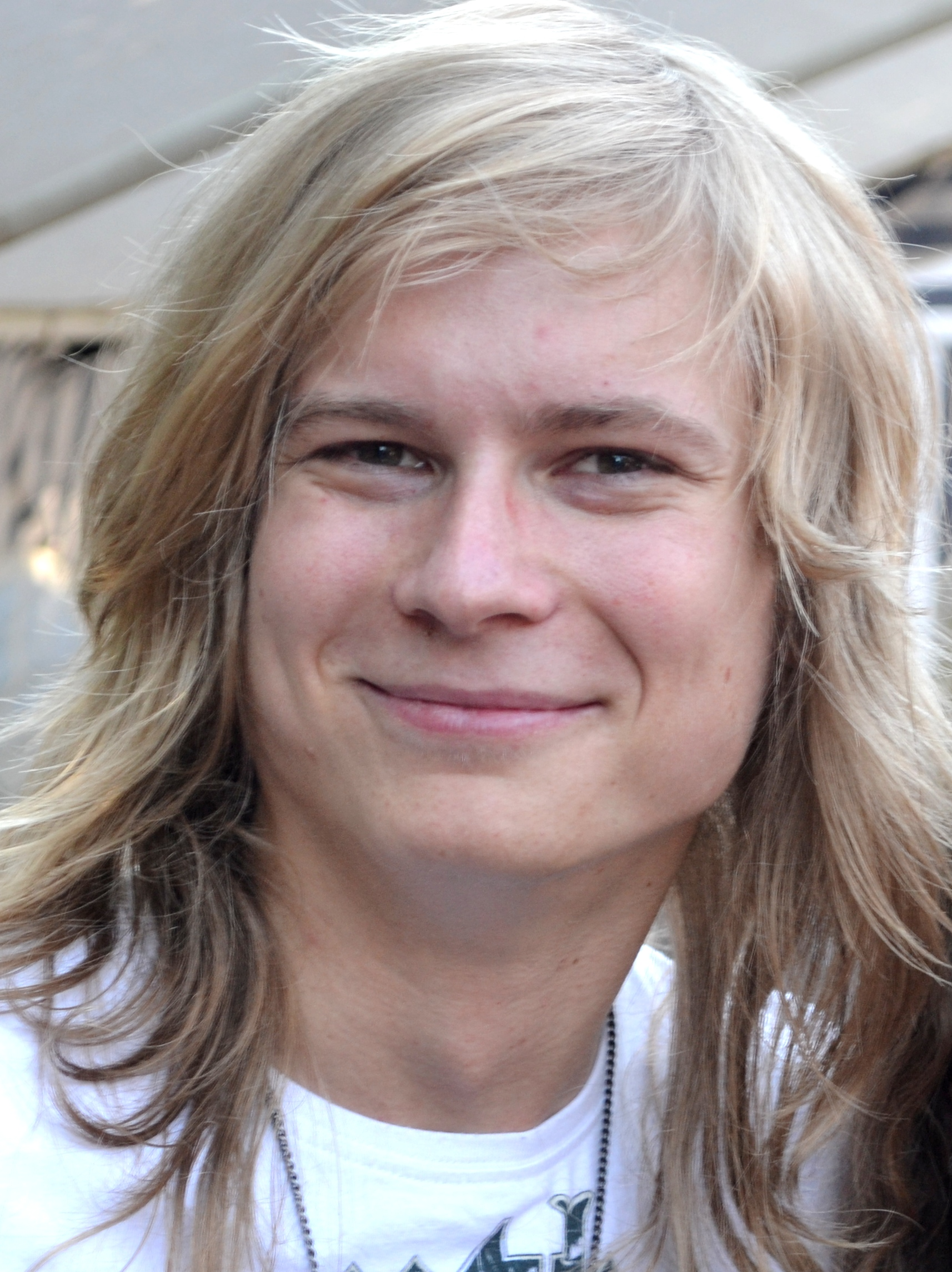
Max Jason Mai was internally selected to represent Slovakia in the Eurovision Song Contest 2012.

RTVS announced in January 2012 that it would select internally its entry for the Eurovision Song Contest 2012. On 7 March 2012, "Don't Close Your Eyes" composed and performed by Miro Šmajda under the stage name Max Jason Mai was announced by the broadcaster as its entry during a press conference. Miro Šmajda previously participated in the Czechoslovak casting show SuperStar in 2009 and placed second. The selection of Max Jason Mai as the Slovak entrant was previously confirmed by RTVS on 16 November 2011 but denied by his management two days later claiming that it was "misunderstood".

== At Eurovision ==
According to Eurovision rules, all nations with the exceptions of the host country and the "Big Five" (France, Germany, Italy, Spain and the United Kingdom) are required to qualify from one of two semi-finals in order to compete for the final; the top ten countries from each semi-final progress to the final. The European Broadcasting Union (EBU) split up the competing countries into six different pots based on voting patterns from previous contests, with countries with favourable voting histories put into the same pot. On 25 January 2012, a special allocation draw was held which placed each country into one of the two semi-finals. Slovakia was placed into the second semi-final, to be held on 24 May 2012.

The running order for the semi-finals was decided through another draw on 20 March 2012 and Slovakia was set to perform in position 15, following the entry from Estonia and before the entry from Norway. At the end of the second semi-final, Slovakia was not announced among the top 10 entries in the first semi-final and therefore failed to qualify to compete in the final. It was later revealed that Slovakia placed eighteenth (last) in the semi-final, receiving a total of 22 points. Slovakia was placed fifteenth by both the public and juries with 32 and 40 points, respectively.

The two semi-finals and the final were broadcast in Slovakia on Jednotka and via radio on Rádio Slovensko with commentary by Roman Bomboš, while the final was also broadcast on via radio on Rádio FM with commentary by Daniel Baláž and Pavol Hubinák. RTVS appointed Mária Pietrová as its spokesperson to announce the top 12-point score awarded by Slovakia during the final.

=== Voting ===
Voting during the three shows involved each country awarding points from 1–8, 10 and 12 as determined by a combination of 50% national jury and 50% televoting. Each nation's jury consisted of five music industry professionals who are citizens of the country they represent. This jury judged each entry based on: vocal capacity; the stage performance; the song's composition and originality; and the overall impression by the act. In addition, no member of a national jury was permitted to be related in any way to any of the competing acts in such a way that they cannot vote impartially and independently.

Below is a breakdown of points awarded to Slovakia and awarded by Slovakia in the second semi-final and grand final of the contest. The nation awarded its 12 points to Sweden in both the semi-final and final of the contest.

==== Points awarded to Slovakia ====
Points awarded to Slovakia (Semi-final 2)
Score	Country
12 points	
10 points	
8 points	
7 points	Malta
6 points	Estonia
5 points	
4 points	Portugal
3 points	Sweden
2 points	
1 point	France; Serbia

==== Points awarded by Slovakia ====
Points awarded by Slovakia (Semi-final 2)
Score	Country
12 points	Sweden
10 points	Estonia
8 points	Serbia
7 points	Lithuania
6 points	Bosnia and Herzegovina
5 points	Portugal
4 points	Norway
3 points	Turkey
2 points	Malta
1 point	Ukraine

Points awarded by Slovakia (Final)
Score	Country
12 points	Sweden
10 points	Estonia
8 points	Hungary
7 points	Serbia
6 points	Azerbaijan
5 points	Italy
4 points	Iceland
3 points	Russia
2 points	Bosnia and Herzegovina
1 point	Macedonia
