= Slovakia in the Eurovision Song Contest 2011 =

- Eurovision Song Contest 2011
- Participating broadcaster: Rozhlas a televízia Slovenska (RTVS)
- Country: Slovakia
- Selection process: Internal selection
- Announcement date: Artist: 18 February 2011; Song: 3 March 2011

Competing entry
- Song: "I'm Still Alive"
- Artist: Twiins
- Songwriters: Bryan Todd; Sandra Nordstrom; Branislav Jančich

Placement
- Semi-final result: Failed to qualify (13th)

Participation chronology

Slovakia was represented at the Eurovision Song Contest 2011 with the song "I'm Still Alive", written by Bryan Todd, Sandra Nordstrom, and Branislav Jančich, and was performed by the duo Twiins. The Slovak participating broadcaster, Rozhlas a televízia Slovenska (RTVS), internally selected its entry for the contest. "I'm Still Alive" performed by Twiins was announced as the Slovak entry on 18 February 2011. The song was presented to the public on 3 March 2011.

Slovakia was drawn to compete in the second semi-final of the Eurovision Song Contest which took place on 12 May 2011. Performing during the show in position 5, "I'm Still Alive" was not announced among the top 10 entries of the second semi-final and therefore did not qualify to compete in the final. It was later revealed that Slovakia placed thirteenth out of the 19 participating countries in the semi-final with 48 points.

== Background ==
Prior to the 2011 contest, Slovenská televízia (STV) had participated in the Eurovision Song Contest representing Slovakia five times since its first entry in 1994. Its best placing in the contest was eighteenth, achieved in 1996 with the song "Kým nás máš" performed by Marcel Palonder. Following the introduction of semi-finals in 2004, Slovakia had yet to feature in a final. They achieved their least successful result in 2009, where they returned to the contest and failed to qualify to the final with the song "Leť tmou" performed by Kamil Mikulčík and Nela Pocisková. In 2010, "Horehronie" performed by Kristina failed to qualify to the final.

After a restructuring that led to the incorporation of STV into Rozhlas a televízia Slovenska (RTVS) on 1 January 2011, it was the latter who participated in the 2011 contest. STV had used both national finals and internal selections to select its Eurovision entries. Despite initially stating that it would not participate due to financial reasons, STV confirmed its intentions to participate at the 2011 contest on 31 December 2010 in order to avoid paying a fine. A public poll on the broadcaster's website on its Eurovision participation, which received an 87.5% positive vote, also reflected the popularity of the contest in the country. In January 2011, RTVS announced that it would internally select its entry for the 2011 contest.

== Before Eurovision ==
=== Internal selection ===
RTVS spokesperson Alexandra Štullerová-Korenová announced in January 2011 that the Slovak entry for the Eurovision Song Contest 2011 would be selected internally. On 18 February 2011, "I'm Still Alive" performed by the duo Twiins was announced by the broadcaster as its entry for the 2011 contest during a press conference. Both Twiins, which consists of identical twin sisters Daniela Jančichová and Veronika Nízlová, and the song were selected by a five-member expert committee consisting of two representatives of STV, two representatives of Slovenský rozhlas (SRo), and an independent member. "Vendetta" performed by 2010 Slovak national final runner-up Mista was also confirmed as the backup entry in the event of the duo being unable to participate. Among other artists that were reportedly under consideration included Miro Šmajda and 2009 Slovak national final runner-up Mukatado.

"I'm Still Alive" was composed by Bryan Todd, Sandra Nordstrom and Branislav Jančich. The release of the song occurred on 3 March 2011, while the official presentation of the song occurred on 5 March during the 2011 Miss Slovak Republic competition which took place at the Sibamac Arena in Bratislava and broadcast on Jednotka.

== At Eurovision ==
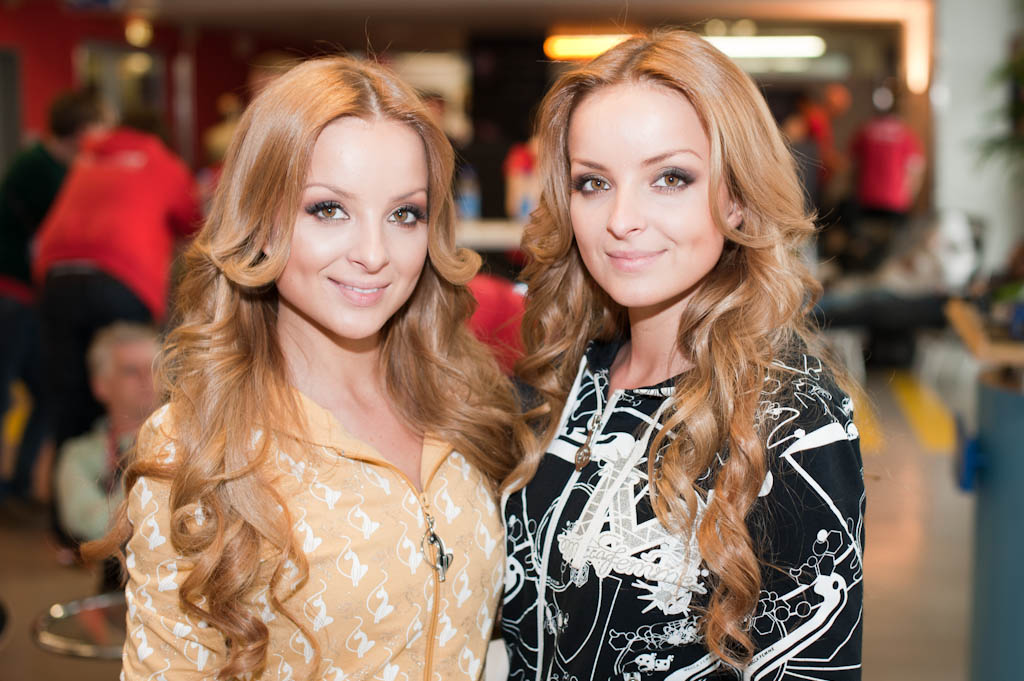
Twiins at the Eurovision Song Contest 2011

According to Eurovision rules, all nations with the exceptions of the host country and the "Big Five" (France, Germany, Italy, Spain, and the United Kingdom) are required to qualify from one of two semi-finals in order to compete for the final; the top ten countries from each semi-final progress to the final. The European Broadcasting Union (EBU) split up the competing countries into six different pots based on voting patterns from previous contests, with countries with favourable voting histories put into the same pot. On 16 January 2011, a special allocation draw was held which placed each country into one of the two semi-finals. Slovakia was placed into the second semi-final, to be held on 12 May 2011.

The running order for the semi-finals was decided through another draw on 15 March 2011 and Slovakia was set to perform in position 5, following the entry from Belgium and before the entry from Ukraine. At the end of the second semi-final, Slovakia was not announced among the top 10 entries in the first second-final and therefore failed to qualify to compete in the final. It was later revealed that Slovakia placed thirteenth in the semi-final, receiving a total of 48 points. Slovakia was placed sixteenth by the public with 40 points and ninth by the juries with 71 points.

The two semi-finals were broadcast in Slovakia on Jednotka and Dvojka, while the final was broadcast on Jednotka and via radio on Rádio FM. All broadcasts featured commentary by Roman Bomboš. RTVS appointed Mária Pietrová as its spokesperson to announce the top 12-point score awarded by Slovakia during the final.

=== Voting ===
Voting during the three shows involved each country awarding points from 1-8, 10 and 12 as determined by a combination of 50% national jury and 50% televoting. Each participating broadcaster assembled a jury of five music industry professionals who are citizens of the country they represent. This jury judged each entry based on: vocal capacity; the stage performance; the song's composition and originality; and the overall impression by the act. In addition, no member of a national jury was permitted to be related in any way to any of the competing acts in such a way that they cannot vote impartially and independently.

Below is a breakdown of points awarded to Slovakia and awarded by Slovakia in the second semi-final and grand final of the contest. The nation awarded its 12 points to Bosnia and Herzegovina in the semi-final and to Ukraine in the final of the contest.

==== Points awarded to Slovakia ====
Points awarded to Slovakia (Semi-final 2)
| Score | Country |
|---|---|
| 12 points | Ukraine |
| 10 points | |
| 8 points | |
| 7 points | Moldova |
| 6 points | Bosnia and Herzegovina |
| 5 points | Ireland |
| 4 points | |
| 3 points | Austria; Belarus; Belgium; Macedonia; Romania; Slovenia |
| 2 points | |
| 1 point | |

==== Points awarded by Slovakia ====
Points awarded by Slovakia (Semi-final 2)
| Score | Country |
|---|---|
| 12 points | Bosnia and Herzegovina |
| 10 points | Ukraine |
| 8 points | Slovenia |
| 7 points | Sweden |
| 6 points | Romania |
| 5 points | Austria |
| 4 points | Moldova |
| 3 points | Denmark |
| 2 points | Ireland |
| 1 point | Belarus |

Points awarded by Slovakia (Final)
| Score | Country |
|---|---|
| 12 points | Ukraine |
| 10 points | Sweden |
| 8 points | Ireland |
| 7 points | Azerbaijan |
| 6 points | Denmark |
| 5 points | Moldova |
| 4 points | Switzerland |
| 3 points | Austria |
| 2 points | Spain |
| 1 point | Slovenia |
