= Twiins =

Slovak pop duo

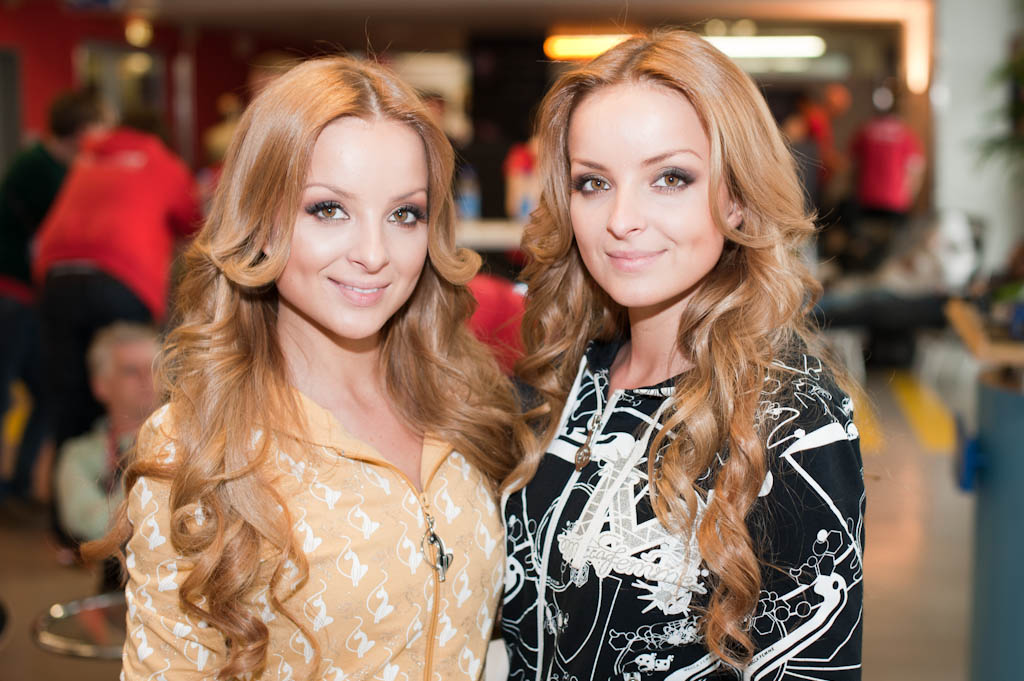
- Twiins at Eurovision Song Contest 2011

Background information
- Born: 15 May 1986 (age 40); Hronský Beňadik, Czechoslovakia
- Genres: Pop, dance-pop
- Years active: 1996–2019; 2021–present
- Members: Daniela Nízlová; Veronika Nízlová
- Website: www.twiinsmusic.com

Twiins (stylized as TWiiNS) is a Slovak pop duo consisting of twin sisters Daniela and Veronika Nízlová. They were born on 15 May 1986 in Hronský Beňadik. They represented Slovakia in the Eurovision Song Contest 2011 with the song "I'm Still Alive".

== Career ==
The twins' music career started in 1996, when the 10 years old girls competed in the children singing competition "Hviezdička", under the name Tweens suggested by the poet and songwriter Daniel Hevier. In 2008, the duo changed its name to Twiins.

Twiins were background singers and dancers for Tereza Kerndlová, the Czech entry in the Eurovision Song Contest 2008. In January 2010, the duo covered "Boys (Summertime Love)" under the title Boys, Boys, Boys featuring Carlprit, originally by Sabrina Salerno.

Twiins represented Slovakia at the Eurovision Song Contest 2011 with their song, "I'm Still Alive", which failed to qualify for the final. They gave Slovakia their best result since entering the competition again in 2009. The song was co-written and produced by Bryan Todd. The song peaked at number 18 in Slovakia.

Twiins released "One Night Stand" featuring Flo Rida in 2012. They performed during his shows in Germany and Miami, Florida.

In 2014 Twiins posed for the Slovak edition of the Playboy magazine. In 2018 they appeared in the reality show Farma on Markíza network.

== Personal life ==
Each of the twins has a daughter. Daniela gave birth to Linda in 2020 with the footballer Stanislav Lobotka, while Veronika's daughter Nea, whose father is the actor Matúš Kolárovský was born in 2022. Until 2024 they lived together in the Tlmače village, but due to the conflicts between their daughters, Daniela moved to Trenčín.

== Discography ==
=== Albums ===
- Tweens (2000)
- Máme čas... (2001)
- Škrtni zápalkou (2003)
- Láska chce viac (2005)
- Compromise (2009)
- Zlatá brána dokorán (2021)

=== Singles ===
Title	Year	Peak chart positions		Album
Title	Year	SK	JP	Album
"Compromise"	2009	4	-	Compromise
"Slip of the Tongue"	2009	18	-	Compromise
"Boys Boys Boys"	2011	30	-	Compromise
"I'm Still Alive"	2011	14	-	Non-album single
"One Night Stand" (ft. Flo Rida)	2014	-	-	Non-album single
"Sagapo"	2015	-	-	Non-album single
"Hey Boy (Montage feat. Twiins)"	2015	-	-	Non-album single
"Latino Love"	2016	-	-	Non-album single

Preceded by Kristina with Horehronie	Slovakia in the Eurovision Song Contest; 2011	Succeeded by Max Jason Mai with Don't Close Your Eyes
