= Horehronie =

Region in Slovakia

Coordinates: 48.811272°N 19.437561°E

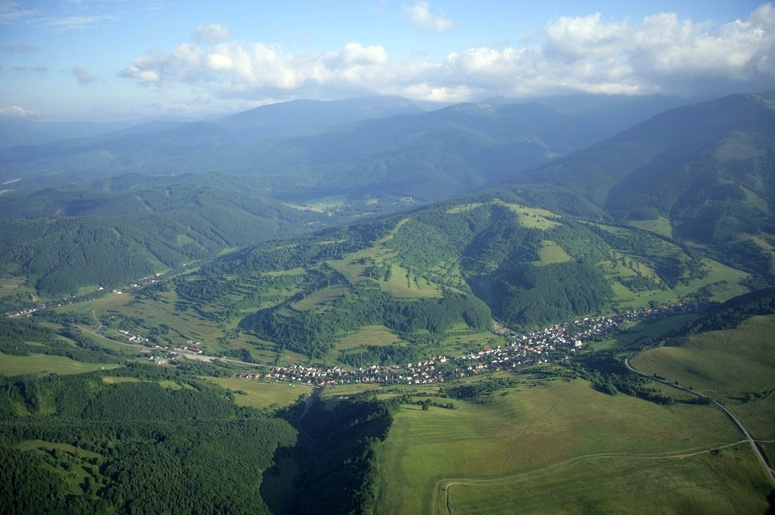
Mýto pod Ďumbierom, a village in Horehronie

Horehronie (also Upper Hron River region or Horné Pohronie or Felső-Garammente) is a tourism and geographic region of Slovakia. It is situated in the Banská Bystrica and Brezno districts and encompasses the upper Hron River valley and the surrounding Low Tatra mountain ranges. The most famous local outlaw was Jakub Surovec. The Slovak entry for the Eurovision Song Contest 2010 was "Horehronie", an ode to the region, performed by singer Kristína.

== See also ==
- Horehronie (song)
