= Slovakia in the Eurovision Song Contest =

- Eurovision Song Contest
- Former participating broadcaster: Slovenská televízia (STV; 1994–2010); Radio and Television of Slovakia (RTVS; 2011–2012)

Participation summary
- Appearances: 7 (3 finals)
- First appearance: 1994
- Last appearance: 2012
- Highest placement: 18th: 1996
- Participation history: ~~1993~~; 1994; 1995; 1996; 1997; 1998; 1999 – 2008; 2009; 2010; 2011; 2012; 2013 – 2026
- Slovakia's page at Eurovision.com
- For the most recent participation see Slovakia in the Eurovision Song Contest 2012

Slovakia has been represented at the Eurovision Song Contest seven times, debuting in 1994. It had attempted to debut in 1993, but did not pass through the qualifying round. In the first three finals that Slovakia participated in, it placed no better than 18th, which it achieved in 1996. Due to poor results, Slovakia was relegated in 1995, 1997 and 1999, and declined to return to the contest in 2000. The country returned in 2009, although it withdrew again within four years, having failed to qualify for the final every year since its return.

== History ==
=== Before participation ===
During the time of Czechoslovakia, Czechoslovak Television (ČST) is known to have broadcast a number of editions of the contest in Czechoslovakia during the 1960s to the early 1990s. Karel Gott, one of the most popular Czechoslovak artists, represented Austria in the 1968 contest, held in London, United Kingdom. Furthermore, the Prague Theatre of Illuminated Drawings from the Czech capital performed as interval act in the 1984 contest, held in Luxembourg, Luxembourg. Czechoslovakia was a member of EBU for a short time from 1991 until its dissolution in 1992.

=== Debut and first span of participation (1993–1998) ===
Slovakia had planned on entering the contest at the 1993 contest, but with the introduction of many new countries, a preliminary round was held to trim down the number of new entries. Kvalifikacija za Millstreet took place on 3 April 1993 and was hosted by Radiotelevizija Slovenija in Ljubljana, Slovenia. The competition featured seven countries competing for only three places in the final. Slovakia was represented by internally selected band Elán with "Amnestia na neveru" and came fourth in the contest, just one point away from qualification behind Croatia, and therefore had to wait another year before entering again. Despite the non-qualification for the event, STV did send a commentary team to Millstreet, Ireland and broadcast coverage of the contest on the broadcaster's main channel.

Slovakia made its first official appearance at the Eurovision Song Contest 1994 in Dublin, where the country was represented for the first time by Tublatanka with "Nekonečná pieseň". Slovakia's first attempt proved reasonably unsuccessful, with the band receiving points from just two countries; three points from Greece and a surprising twelve points from Malta placing the country nineteenth on the leaderboard. This was unfortunately not enough to guarantee a spot for Slovakia in the Eurovision Song Contest 1995, with the then EBU rules specifying that the bottom seven countries would be relegated the following year. STV then decided to not even broadcast the 1995 contest.

In 1996, Slovakia returned to the Eurovision Song Contest, with STV deciding to internally select their representative for the third time in a row. Ultimately, Marcel Palonder was internally selected to represent Slovakia in Eurovision Song Contest 1996 with the song "Kým nás máš". Due to the rising number of countries wishing to participate, in 1996 the EBU introduced an audio-only qualification round. Slovakia managed to qualify in seventeenth place in a field of twenty-nine and progressed to the final. Here, Slovakia achieved their best result to date, placing eighteenth with nineteen points. However, it was not enough to guarantee participation in the 1997 contest and Slovakia was, once again, relegated.

For the 1998 contest, which was held in Birmingham in the United Kingdom, STV selected their artist through the national final Bratislavská Lýra 1998 - a contest which held previously been held during the existence of Czechoslovakia but revived for the purpose of selecting Slovakia's artist for the Eurovision Song Contest. The event took place on 7 June 1997, in which Katarína Hasprová took victory and was hence selected by STV to represent the country at the 1998 contest. The broadcaster internally selected "Modlitba" to be sung by Hasprová. At the contest, Slovakia only managed to receive eight points - all of which came from Croatia. This was the country's last participation for a number of years.

=== First withdrawal (1999–2008) ===
Due to a poor average score, Slovakia was automatically excluded from the Eurovision Song Contest 1999 and would therefore not be eligible to participate until 2000. However, after being due to return, STV withdrew due to financial concerns. Throughout the early 2000s, the Eurovision project was mainly ignored by STV. After the first appearance of Slovakia's neighbour: the Czech Republic in 2007, the program director of Slovenská Televízia (STV), Peter Lipták, stated on 11 May 2007 that STV would like to participate in the 2008 contest, but due to a lack of financial funds Slovakia did not make a return.

=== Second span of participation (2009–2012) ===
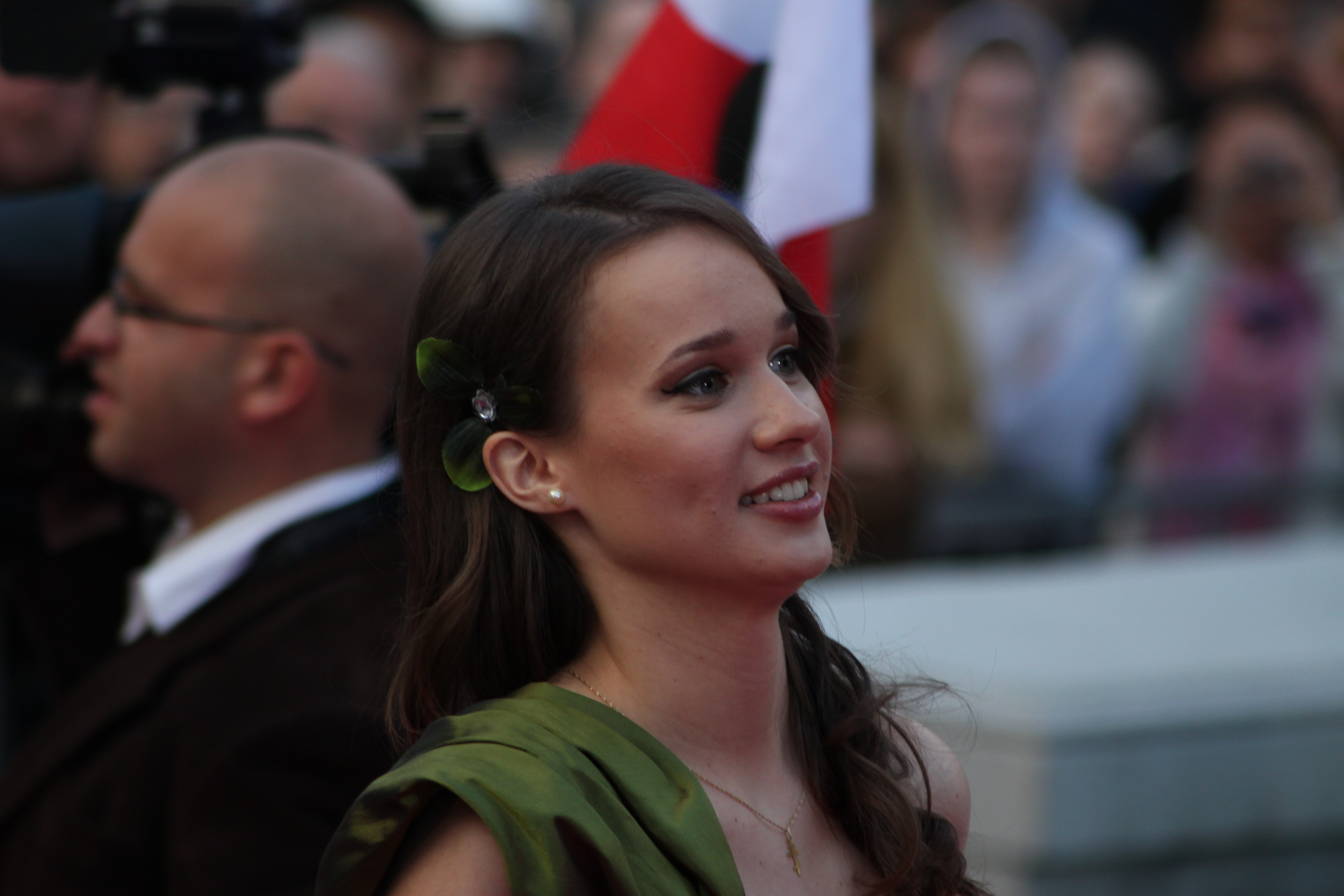
Kristína represented Slovakia in 2010 and failed to qualify from the semi-final despite being a bookmakers and fan favourite to win the contest.

On 24 September 2008, STV announced their return to the Eurovision Song Contest in 2009 after an eleven-year absence. The program director of STV Roman Lipták stated that the pressure from local artists was the driving force behind the country's return. Upon their return, STV organised a large-scale national final to select their entry. Eurosong 2009 consisted of six shows which commenced on 15 February 2009 and concluded with a final on 8 March 2009. The competition resulted in the selection of Slovak duo Kamil Mikulčík and Nela Pocisková with "Leť tmou". At the contest, the entry only received eight points, finishing eighteenth (second-last) in their semi-final and failed to qualify for the final of the competition. For the 2010 contest, STV held the same national selection method, which resulted in the selection of Kristína with "Horehronie". Despite being a bookies and fan favourite, the song failed to qualify to the final - finishing in sixteenth place (also second-last) with twenty-four points.

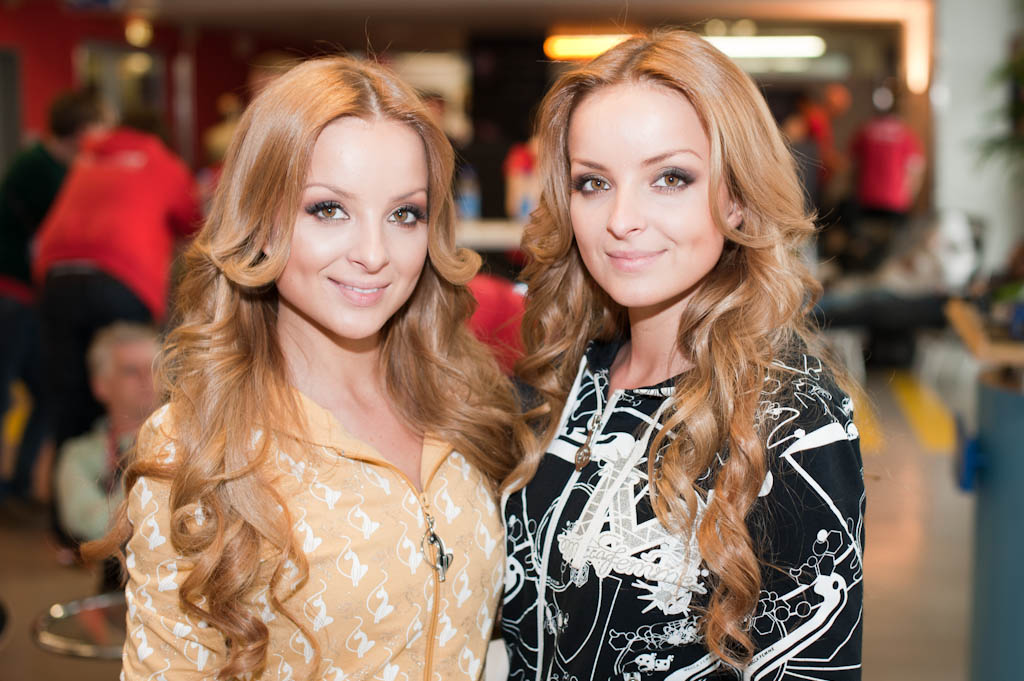
Twiins represented Slovakia in 2011.

Though STV originally stated that Slovakia would not take part in the Eurovision Song Contest in 2011, it eventually did appear in Düsseldorf represented by the new national public broadcaster Radio and Television of Slovakia (RTVS), which had been created on 1 January 2011. On 18 February 2011, RTVS revealed their choice for Slovakia's 2011 entry. The song was "I'm Still Alive" and was performed by twin sisters Daniela and Veronika Nízlová, known as the pop duo TWiiNS. The sisters had prior experience at Eurovision as backing singers and dancers for Tereza Kerndlová, the Czech entry in the Eurovision Song Contest 2008. The 2011 entry was the first Slovak entry performed in English. TWiiNS eventually also failed to qualify for the final, finishing 13th in their semi-final and scoring 48 points, just six points away from qualification. RTVS sent an entry to the contest in 2012, with a song that was selected internally. At a press conference on 7 March 2012, the Slovak entry for the 2012 Eurovision Song Contest was announced as Max Jason Mai with the song "Don't Close Your Eyes". It was performed in the second semi-final, held on 24 May 2012 and did not qualify in the final, placing last with 22 points.

=== Second withdrawal (2013–present) ===
On 4 December 2012, RTVS announced its withdrawal from the 2013 contest, beginning an absence that has continued in every edition since. However, RTVS returned to Eurovision Young Dancers in 2015, with RTVS explaining that their return to Eurovision Young Dancers was in support of domestic production and promoted national culture at a European level. RTVS' PR manager, Juraj Kadáš, explained in April 2016 that Slovakia's absence from the contest since 2012 was not due to poor results, but rather the costs associated with participation. This was reiterated in May 2023 by Filip Púchovský from the PR department of RTVS, adding that if Slovakia were to return to the contest, their artist would likely have to fund themselves rather than by the broadcaster.

On 8 August 2023, the head of marketing communication at RTVS, Zuzana Vicelová, stated that the broadcaster was considering a return to the contest in 2025, following a restructuring of the broadcaster's financing model by the Slovak government, with the support of general director Ľuboš Machaj. The following month, Machaj declared that the broadcaster was actively working to secure the funding needed to participate in 2025. On 8 April 2024, RTVS announced that it would not return to the contest in 2025 due to budget cuts, putting any potential return in jeopardy.

On 29 May 2025, Filip Púchovský, a press representative for the newly reconstituted Slovak public broadcaster Slovak Television and Radio (STVR), stated that Slovakia plans to reassess its participation in the contest and may return under "favourable budgetary and artistic conditions". However, on 23 July 2025, Púchovský confirmed that Slovakia will not return to the contest, stating that "the costs of full participation, including licensing fees, production and logistics, are disproportionately high compared to the revenues and societal impact", thus hindering chances of a Slovak return to the contest in the future. In May 2026, Jindřich Bardan, director of Rádio Slovensko, reported that STVR attempted to return to the 2026 contest in Vienna with participation possibilities being explored until the "very last minute", adding that plans were eventually scrapped due to high cost of licensing fees and production. Bardan stated that the broadcaster remained committed to returning to the contest in the future. On 2 August 2026, STVR ruled out a return for 2027.

== Participation overview ==
Table key
| ◁ | Last place |
| ◇ | Entry selected but did not compete |

| Year | Artist | Song | Language | Final | Points | Semi | Points |
|---|---|---|---|---|---|---|---|
| 1993 | Elán ◇ | "Amnestia na neveru" ◇ | Slovak ◇ | Failed to qualify (Note: A qualifying round was held for new countries looking to make their debut at the 1993 contest. Slovakia failed to progress from this round; entries which failed to progress have subsequently been discounted by the EBU and do not feature as part of the countries' list of appearances.) | | 4 | 50 |
| 1994 | Martin Ďurinda and Tublatanka | "Nekonečná pieseň" | Slovak | 19 | 15 | No semi-finals | |
| 1996 | Marcel Palonder | "Kým nás máš" | Slovak | 18 | 19 | 17 | 38 |
| 1998 | Katarína Hasprová | "Modlitba" | Slovak | 21 | 8 | No semi-finals | |
| 2009 | Kamil Mikulčík and Nela Pocisková | "Leť tmou" | Slovak | Failed to qualify | | 18 | 8 |
| 2010 | Kristina | "Horehronie" | Slovak | Failed to qualify | | 16 | 24 |
| 2011 | Twiins | "I'm Still Alive" | English | Failed to qualify | | 13 | 48 |
| 2012 | Max Jason Mai | "Don't Close Your Eyes" | English | Failed to qualify | | 18 ◁ | 22 |

== Trivia ==
=== Songs by language ===
1. English (25.0%)
2. Slovak (75.0%)

| Songs | Language | Years |
|---|---|---|
| 6 | Slovak | 1993, 1994, 1996, 1998, 2009, 2010 |
| 2 | English | 2011, 2012 |

=== Selection process ===
| Year | Selection process |
|---|---|
| 1993 | Internal selection |
| 1994 | Internal selection |
| 1996 | Internal selection |
| 1998 | Bratislavská lýra for artist; internal selection for song |
| 2009 | Eurosong with 50 participants |
| 2010 | Eurosong with 60 participants |
| 2011 | Internal selection |
| 2012 | Internal selection |

== Related involvement ==
=== Delegation members ===
The public broadcaster of each participating country in the Eurovision Song Contest assigns a head of delegation as the EBU's contact person and the leader of their delegation at the event. The delegation, whose size can greatly vary, includes a head of press, the contestants, songwriters, composers and backing vocalists, among others.

==== Heads of delegation ====
| Year | Head of delegation | Ref. |
|---|---|---|
| 2011–2012 | Jana Majorava | |

==== Heads of press ====
| Year | Head of press | Ref. |
|---|---|---|
| 2011–2012 | Alon Amir | |

=== Costume designers ===
| Year | Costume designers | Ref. |
|---|---|---|
| 2011 | Lucia Senášiová | |

=== Conductors ===
Between 1993 and 1998, Slovakia sent a native conductor to the contest every year the country took part until the orchestra was dropped by the EBU in 1999.

| Year | Conductor (Note: All conductors are of Slovak nationality unless otherwise noted.) | Ref. |
|---|---|---|
| Kvalifikacija za Millstreet | Vladimir Valovič | |
| 1994 | Vladimir Valovič | |
| 1996 | Juraj Burian | |
| 1998 | Vladimír Valovič | |

=== Commentators and spokespersons ===
For the show's broadcast on STV and RTVS, various commentators have provided commentary on the contest in the Slovak language. At the Eurovision Song Contest after all points are calculated, the presenters of the show call upon each voting country to invite each respective spokesperson to announce the results of their vote on-screen. In 2011, Rádio FM began broadcasting the final of the contest, a broadcast which has continued every year (with the exception of 2022) from Slovakia's withdrawal in 2012 until the creation of Slovak Television and Radio in 2025. Though the EBU initially announced that STVR would be broadcasting the final of the 2025 contest on radio, the broadcast never appeared on STVR radio scheduling.

| Year | Television | | Radio | | Spokesperson | Ref. |
| Year | Channel | Commentator | Channel | Commentator | Spokesperson | Ref. |
|---|---|---|---|---|---|---|
| 1965 | ČST | Unknown | No broadcast | | Did not participate | |
| 1966 | ČST | Vladimír Dvořák | No broadcast | | Did not participate | |
| 1967 | ČST | Vladimír Dvořák | No broadcast | | Did not participate | |
| 1968 | ČST | Miroslav Horníček | No broadcast | | Did not participate | |
| 1969 | ČST | Unknown | No broadcast | | Did not participate | |
| 1970 | ČST1 | Vladimír Dvořák and Ivan Úradníček | No broadcast | | Did not participate | |
| 1971 | ČST1 | Ivan Úradníček | No broadcast | | Did not participate | |
| 1972 | ČST2 | Blažena Kočtúchová | No broadcast | | Did not participate | |
| 1973 | ČST2 | J. Šrámek | No broadcast | | Did not participate | |
| 1974–1975 | Unknown | | No broadcast | | Did not participate | |
| 1976 | ČST2 | Unknown | No broadcast | | Did not participate | |
| 1977 | ČST2 | Unknown | No broadcast | | Did not participate | |
| 1978–1980 | Unknown | | No broadcast | | Did not participate | |
| 1981 | ČST2 | Unknown | No broadcast | | Did not participate | |
| 1982 | ČST1 | Unknown | No broadcast | | Did not participate | |
| 1983 | ČST2 | Unknown | No broadcast | | Did not participate | |
| 1984 | ČST2 | Unknown | No broadcast | | Did not participate | |
| 1985 | ČST2 | Unknown | No broadcast | | Did not participate | |
| 1986 | ČST2 | Unknown | No broadcast | | Did not participate | |
| 1987 | ČST2 | Unknown | No broadcast | | Did not participate | |
| 1988 | ČST2 | Unknown | No broadcast | | Did not participate | |
| 1989 | ČST1 | Unknown | No broadcast | | Did not participate | |
| 1990 | ČST2 | Unknown | No broadcast | | Did not participate | |
| 1991 | S1 | Unknown | No broadcast | | Did not participate | |
| 1992 | F1 | Unknown | No broadcast | | Did not participate | |
| 1993 | STV2 | Unknown | No broadcast | | Did not participate | |
| 1994 | STV2 | Unknown | No broadcast | | Juraj Čurný | |
| 1995 | No broadcast | | No broadcast | | Did not participate | N/A |
| 1996 | STV2 | Unknown | No broadcast | | Alena Heribanová | |
| 1997 | STV2 | Unknown | No broadcast | | Did not participate | |
| 1998 | STV2 | Unknown | No broadcast | | Alena Heribanová | |
| 1999–2008 | No broadcast | | No broadcast | | Did not participate | N/A |
| 2009 | Dvojka | Roman Bomboš | No broadcast | | Ľubomír Bajaník | |
| 2010 | Dvojka | Roman Bomboš | No broadcast | | Ľubomír Bajaník | |
| 2011 | Jednotka (SF1 & Final); Dvojka (SF2) | Roman Bomboš | Rádio FM | Roman Bomboš | Mária Pietrová | |
| 2012 | Jednotka | Roman Bomboš | Rádio Slovensko; Rádio FM | Roman Bomboš (Rádio Slovensko); Daniel Baláž and Pavol Hubinák (Rádio FM) | Mária Pietrová | |
| 2013 | No broadcast | | Rádio FM | Daniel Baláž and Pavol Hubinák | Did not participate | |
| 2014 | No broadcast | | Rádio FM | Daniel Baláž, Pavol Hubinák and Juraj Kemka | Did not participate | |
| 2015 | No broadcast | | Rádio FM | Daniel Baláž, Pavol Hubinák and Juraj Kemka | Did not participate | |
| 2016 | No broadcast | | Rádio FM | Daniel Baláž, Pavol Hubinák and Juraj Kemka | Did not participate | |
| 2017 | No broadcast | | Rádio FM | Daniel Baláž, Pavol Hubinák and Juraj Kemka | Did not participate | |
| 2018 | No broadcast | | Rádio FM | Daniel Baláž, Pavol Hubinák, Juraj Malíček, Ela Tolstová and Celeste Buckingham | Did not participate | |
| 2019 | No broadcast | | Rádio FM | Daniel Baláž and Pavol Hubinák | Did not participate | |
| 2021 | No broadcast | | Rádio FM | Daniel Baláž, Lucia Haverlík, Pavol Hubinák and Juraj Malíček | Did not participate | |
| 2022 | No broadcast | | No broadcast (Note: Rádio FM had initially planned to broadcast the contest, but cancelled the day before the final due to health issues with one of the commentators.) | | Did not participate | |
| 2023 | No broadcast | | Rádio FM | Daniel Baláž, Lucia Haverlík, Pavol Hubinák and Juraj Malíček | Did not participate | |
| 2024 | No broadcast | | Rádio FM | Daniel Baláž, Lucia Haverlík, Pavol Hubinák and Juraj Malíček | Did not participate | |
| 2025–2026 | No broadcast | | No broadcast | | Did not participate | |

== Photo gallery ==
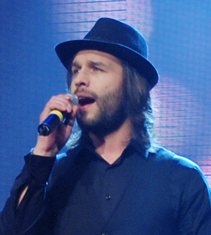
Kamil Mikulčík in Moscow (2009)

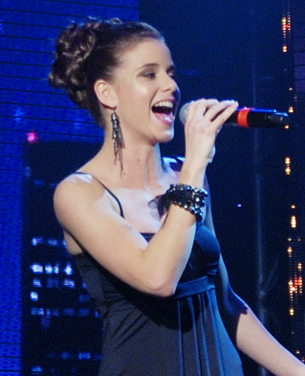
Nela Pocisková in Moscow (2009)

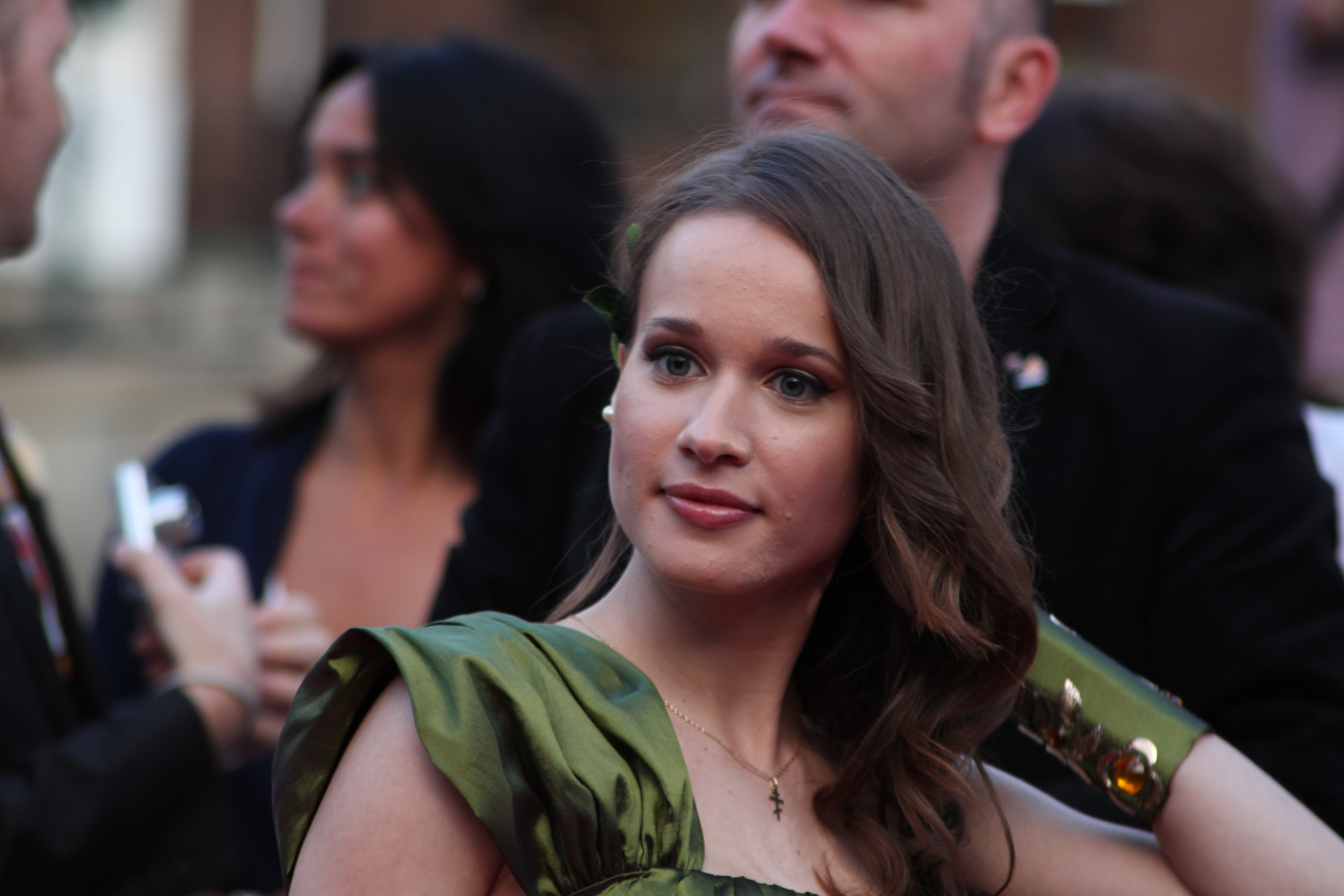
Kristina in Oslo (2010)

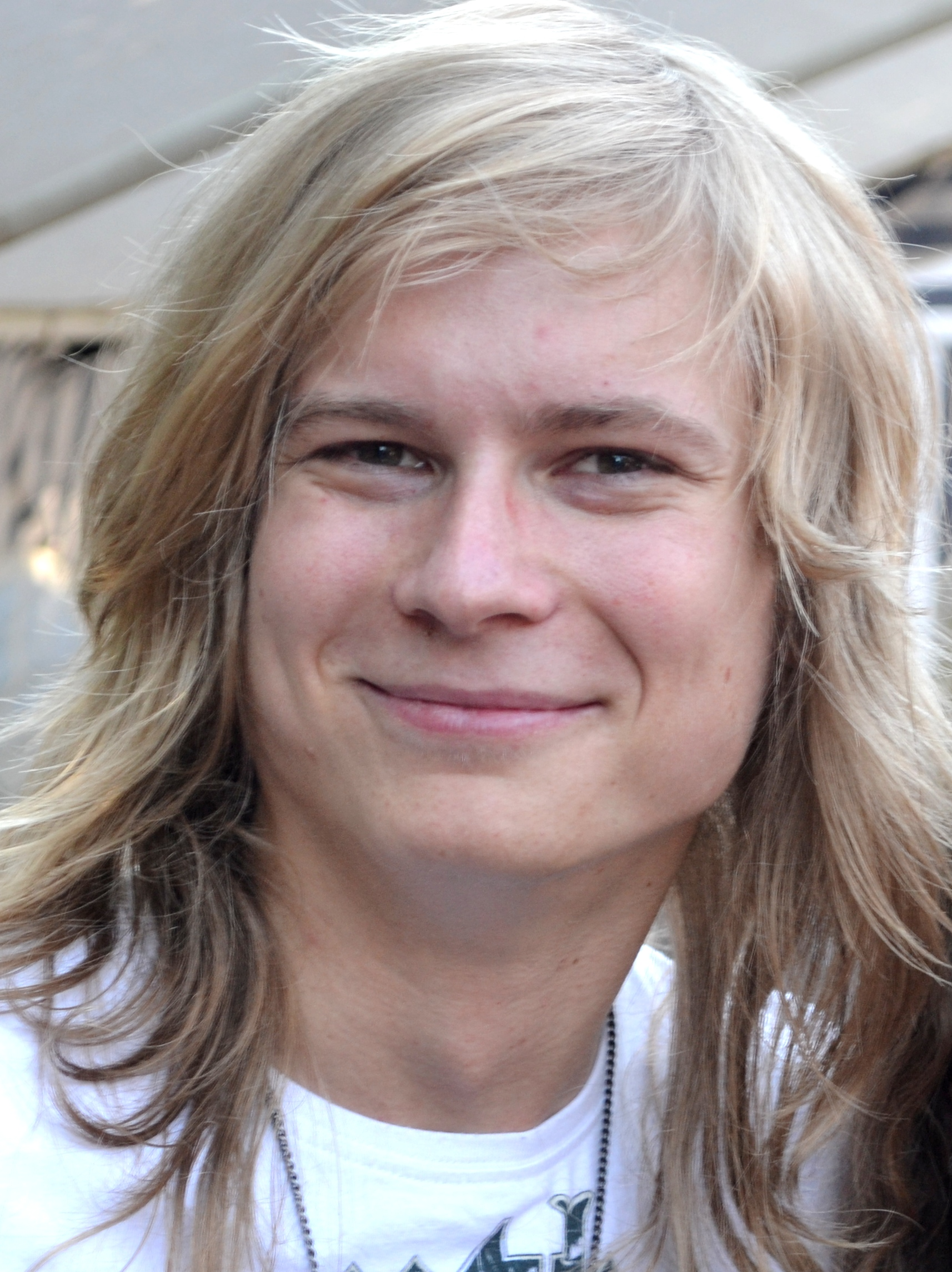
Max Jason Mai in Baku (2012)
