= Slovakia in the Eurovision Song Contest 2010 =

- Eurovision Song Contest 2010
- Participating broadcaster: Slovenská televízia (STV)
- Country: Slovakia
- Selection process: Eurosong 2010
- Selection date: 27 February 2010

Competing entry
- Song: "Horehronie"
- Artist: Kristina
- Songwriters: Kamil Peteraj; Martin Kavulič

Placement
- Semi-final result: Failed to qualify (16th)

Participation chronology

Slovakia was represented at the Eurovision Song Contest 2010 with the song "Horehronie", written by Kamil Peteraj and Martin Kavulič, and performed by Kristina. The Slovak participating broadcaster, Slovenská televízia (STV), selected its entry for the contest through the national final Eurosong 2010. 60 entries competed in the national final which consisted of nine shows: six quarter-finals, two semi-finals and a final. In the quarter-finals, four entries were selected by a public vote to advance from each show. Twenty-four entries qualified to compete in the semi-finals where six entries were selected to advance from each show based on the combination of votes from a three-member jury panel and a public vote. Twelve entries ultimately qualified to compete in the final on 27 February 2010 where "Horehronie" performed by Kristina was selected as the winner after scoring the most points from the jury and public vote.

Slovakia was drawn to compete in the first semi-final of the Eurovision Song Contest which took place on 25 May 2010. Performing during the show in position 4, "Horehronie" was not announced among the top 10 entries of the second semi-final and therefore did not qualify to compete in the final. It was later revealed that Slovakia placed sixteenth out of the 17 participating countries in the semi-final with 24 points.

== Background ==
Prior to the 2010 contest, Slovenská televízia (STV) had participated in the Eurovision Song Contest representing Slovakia four times since its first entry in 1994. Its best placing in the contest was eighteenth, achieved in 1996 with the song "Kým nás máš" performed by Marcel Palonder. Following the introduction of semi-finals in 2004, Slovakia had yet to feature in a final. Slovakia achieved their least successful result in 2009, where they returned to the contest and failed to qualify to the final with the song "Leť tmou" performed by Kamil Mikulčík and Nela Pocisková.

As part of its duties as participating broadcaster, STV organises the selection of its entry in the Eurovision Song Contest and broadcasts the event in the country. The broadcaster had used both national finals and internal selections to select its Eurovision entries. STV confirmed its intentions to participate at the 2010 contest on 28 March 2009. In 2009, STV selected its entry via a national final, a procedure that was continued for its 2010 participation.

== Before Eurovision ==
=== Eurosong 2010 ===
The logo of Eurosong 2010

Eurosong 2010 was the national final format developed by STV in order to select its entry for the Eurovision Song Contest 2010. The competition consisted of nine shows which commenced on 22 January 2010 and concluded with a final on 27 February 2010. The nine shows took place at the STV studios in Bratislava and hosted by Martin Rausch with Martin Kontúr hosting segments from the green room. All shows in the competition were broadcast on Jednotka as well as online at the broadcaster's official website stv.sk. The final was also broadcast online at the official Eurovision Song Contest website eurovision.tv.

==== Format ====
The format of the competition consisted of nine shows: six quarter-finals on 22 January 2010, 24 January 2010, 29 January 2010, 31 January 2010, 5 February 2010 and 7 February 2010, two semi-finals on 14 and 21 February 2010, and a final on 27 February 2010. The quarter-finals each featured ten competing entries from which a public televote exclusively determined the top four entries to qualify to the semi-finals. The two semi-finals each featured twelve entries from which the 50/50 combination of votes from a public televote and a jury panel determined the top six entries to qualify to the final. Both the public and the jury assigned scores ranging from 1 (lowest) to 12 (highest) and the six entries that had the highest number of points following the combination of these scores advanced to the final. The final featured the remaining twelve entries and the winner was determined by the 50/50 combination of votes from a public televote and a jury panel. Both the public and the jury assigned scores ranging from 1 to 12 and the entry that had the highest number of points following the combination of these scores was declared the winner. Viewers were able to vote via SMS and the proceeds from the public voting were donated towards those affected by the 2010 Haiti earthquake. In the event of a tie during the semi-finals and final, the tie was decided in favour of the entry that received the highest score from the public vote.

==== Competing entries ====
Artists and composers were able to submit their entries between 14 July 2009 and 30 October 2009. Artists were required to hold Slovak citizenship. Songwriters were able to submit more than one song, however each artist could only perform one song in the competition. Songs were required to be performed in Slovak with an exception being made for the chorus which could be in English. The broadcaster received 239 submissions at the closing of the deadline and an expert committee selected sixty entries for the competition. The competing entries were announced on 15 December 2009 and among the artists was Marcel Palonder who represented Slovakia in 1996. On 26 January 2010, "Chýrna zem" performed by Gionno and Ján Mitaľ and "Sevilla" performed by Golden Storm were withdrawn from the competition and replaced with the songs "Príčina" performed by Guru Brothers and "Dolina, dolina" performed by Lekra.

Artist	Song	Songwriter(s)
Alek Malo and Dolly Booster	"Zmysel života"	Alek Malo
Alone	"Strašne mi chýbaš"	Michal Cabala
Andrea Súlovská	"Život"	Andrea Súlovská
Arzén	"Keď som išiel za ránky"	Pavol Cabadaj, Jaroslav Gažo
Aya	"Do neba volám"	Boris Lettrich
Barbora Šulíková	"Čelný náraz"	Ada Žigová, Jaroslav Žigo
Bystrík	"Slnko nespáli"	Bystrik
Dáška Kostovčik and Peter Bič Project	"Dážď"	Peter Bič, Stanislav Lauro
Dominika Mirgová	"Cesta snov"	Dominika Mirgová, Lukey
Dreamtouch	"Je to OK"	Anna Bajcurová, M. Lukáč, L. Liba, Martin Hybben
Družina	"Koniec sveta"	Izabela Bérešová, Martin Sabov, Juraj Haško
Exponent	"Zveste lásku z kríža"	Tomáš Kmet
Free Voices	"Z osnov"	Robert Bendik
Funny Fellows	"Obrázok"	Zuzana Haasová, Roman Féder
Get Explode	"Blue Sun"	Marián Čurko, Laco Kováč
Guru Brothers	"Príčina"	Pavel Botoš, Štefan Tomolya
Happyband	"Mafiánska"	Vašo Michalčik
Horská chata	"Myslíš, že vieš kto som"	Peter Cingel, Horská Chata
Hrdza	"Taká sa mi páči"	Slavomir Gibarti
Hudba z Marsu	"Final Song"	Michal Štofej
Ivana Poláčková	"So mnou všetko smieš"	Jimi Cimbala, Zoltán Tóth
Kristina	"Horehronie"	Kamil Peteraj, Martin Kavulič
Lekra	"Dolina, dolina"	Lekra
Lucia Olešová	"Rok a pol"	Dušan Giertl, Tibor Laurinčik
Marcel and Tomáš Palonder feat. Street Dance Academy	"Slová slov"	Václav Šuplata, Marcel Palonder
Marcel Berky	"Kým sa dá"	Miroslav Jurika, Marián Brezáni, Jimi Cimbala, Zoltán Tóth
Margot	"Tak ma hrej"	Andrea Zimániová, Daniel Urbán
Marián Bango	"Ty tu ticho spíš"	Tibor Jediný
Martin Konrád	"Ja viem"	Martin Konrád
Martina Schindlerová	"Môžeš ísť"	Peter Lehotský, Juraj Zaujec
Matej Koreň	"Kocka pána Rubika"	Matej Koreň
Matka Guráž	"Listobranie"	Robert Ruman
Mayo	"Tón"	Marián Varhaník
Metalinda	"Keď strácam dych"	Peter Sámel
Michaella	"O nás"	Silvia Kaščáková, Vladimir Gnepa
Michal Chrenko	"Kto vlastne som"	Miroslav Jurika, Marián Brezáni, Michal Chrenko
Miro Jaroš	"Bez siedmeho neba"	Miro Jaroš, Vladimir Gnepa
Mista	"Emotions"	Soňa Šimorová
Otto Weiter and Makar Čudra	"Vrtká"	Viktov Mikláš, Ivan Kutný
Palo Drapák Band	"Pocit vášne"	Juraj Žák, Palo Drapák
Pavol Kusý and No Frost	"Slzy v daždi"	Pavol Kusý
Pavol Remenár, Klára and Liquid Error	"Figaro"	Pavol Jursa, Peter Farnbauer
Peter Bažík	"Paradise vs Babylon"	Peter Bažik
Petra Humeňanská	"Rosa rosí"	Jana Humeňanská
Renáta Čonková and Martina Polievková	"Dúha"	Pavol Kubica, Emil Čonka
Reverz Park	"Po kvapkách"	Peter Klema, Števo Faltin, Peter Fotta
Richard Čanaky and FBI	"Zlomené krídla"	Richard Čanaky
Róbert Mikla	"Voda a oheň"	Róbert Mikla, Milan Herstek,
Robo Opatovský	"Niečo máš"	Peter Konečny, Robo Opatovský
Robo Šimko and MassRiot	"Podľa vlastnej hlavy"	Marián Brezáni, Miroslav Jurika, MassRiot
Save the Cookie	"My World"	Igor Baar, Save the Cookie
Six and Kristy	"Priestor pre dvoch"	Mário Karas
Smola a hrušky	"Pridaj si ma"	Jozef Kramár
Soňa	"Skús ma viesť"	Peter Sámel
Stereo	"Niekde medzi tým"	Andy Ďurica
Stopa	"Nightsong"	Marcel Jurčensková, Stopa
Sunlips	"Správy v splne"	Pavol Vozár
Tomáš Bezdeda	"Na strechách domov"	Monika Hajšová, Tomáš Bezdeda
Vierka Ayisi	"Je čas zabávať sa"	Vierka Ayisi, Jozef Šebo, Baddogzz Production
Viki Matušovová	"Uhol pohľadu"	Miroslav Jurika, Marián Brezáni, Brunno Oravec

==== Quarter-finals ====
The six quarter-finals took place between 22 January and 7 February 2010. Four entries as determined by a public televote qualified to the semi-final from each quarter-final. On 28 January 2010, "Taká sa mi páči" performed by Hrdza which qualified from the first quarter-final was disqualified from the competition due to the song having been performed before 1 October 2009; the song "Myslíš, že vieš kto som" performed by Horská chata which placed fifth was selected as a replacement qualifier.

Quarter-final 1 – 22 January 2010
R/O	Artist	Song	Televote	Place
1	Tomáš Bezdeda	"Na strechách domov"	16.9%	3
2	Dreamtouch	"Je to OK"	3.1%	9
3	Horská chata	"Myslíš, že vieš kto som"	8.7%	5
4	Michaella	"O nás"	15.9%	4
5	~~Hrdza~~	~~"Taká sa mi páči"~~	~~19.5%~~	~~1~~
6	Six and Kristy	"Priestor pre dvoch"	5.9%	6
7	Richard Čanaky and FBI	"Zlomené krídla"	18.5%	2
8	Margot	"Tak ma hrej"	2.5%	10
9	Michal Chrenko	"Kto vlastne som"	3.9%	8
10	Lucia Olešová	"Rok a pol"	5.0%	7

Quarter-final 2 – 24 January 2010
R/O	Artist	Song	Televote	Place
1	Matka Guráž	"Listobranie"	10.11%	5
2	Dominika Mirgová	"Cesta snov"	4.90%	9
3	Get Explode	"Blue Sun"	12.70%	4
4	Mista	"Emotions"	16.05%	1
5	Matej Koreň	"Kocka pána Rubika"	6.57%	7
6	Pavol Remenár, Klára and Liquid Error	"Figaro"	15.97%	2
7	Peter Bažík	"Paradise vs Babylon"	15.09%	3
8	Viki Matušovová	"Uhol pohľadu"	5.81%	8
9	Metalinda	"Keď strácam dych"	9.85%	6
10	Funny Fellows	"Obrázok"	2.94%	10

Quarter-final 3 – 29 January 2010
R/O	Artist	Song	Televote	Place
1	Robo Šimko and MassRiot	"Podľa vlastnej hlavy"	8.1%	7
2	Renáta Čonková and Martina Polievková	"Dúha"	13.6%	3
3	Reverz Park	"Po kvapkách"	11.9%	6
4	Andrea Súlovská	"Život"	1.2%	10
5	Lekra	"Dolina, dolina"	5.7%	8
6	Martin Konrád	"Ja viem"	13.5%	4
7	Free Voices	"Z osnov"	14.2%	2
8	Hudba z Marsu	"Final Song"	12.0%	5
9	Robo Opatovský	"Niečo máš"	15.9%	1
10	Guru Brothers	"Príčina"	4.0%	9

Quarter-final 4 – 31 January 2010
R/O	Artist	Song	Televote	Place
1	Mayo	"Tón"	12.9%	2
2	Stereo	"Niekde medzi tým"	7.9%	7
3	Barbora Šulíková	"Čelný náraz"	9.9%	6
4	Alek Malo and Dolly Booster	"Zmysel života"	4.6%	9
5	Save the Cookie	"My World"	7.0%	8
6	Pavol Kusý and No Frost	"Slzy v daždi"	10.2%	5
7	Petra Humeňanská	"Rosa rosí"	11.6%	4
8	Palo Drapák Band	"Pocit vášne"	3.9%	10
9	Alone	"Strašne mi chýbaš"	12.0%	3
10	Martina Schindlerová	"Môžeš ísť"	20.0%	1

Quarter-final 5 – 5 February 2010
R/O	Artist	Song	Televote	Place
1	Smola a hrušky	"Pridaj si ma"	12.1%	2
2	Vierka Ayisi	"Je čas zabávať sa"	2.2%	9
3	Bystrík	"Slnko nespáli"	2.7%	8
4	Arzén	"Keď som išiel za ránky"	5.7%	6
5	Sunlips	"Správy v splne"	11.5%	5
6	Marcel Berky	"Kým sa dá"	1.1%	10
7	Dáška Kostovčik and Peter Bič Project	"Dážď"	11.6%	4
8	Róbert Mikla	"Voda a oheň"	12.0%	3
9	Kristina	"Horehronie"	36.7%	1
10	Exponent	"Zveste lásku z kríža"	4.5%	7

Quarter-final 6 – 7 February 2010
R/O	Artist	Song	Televote	Place
1	Ivana Poláčková	"So mnou všetko smieš"	3.7%	7
2	Marián Bango	"Ty tu ticho spíš"	14.8%	4
3	Stopa	"Nightsong"	8.5%	6
4	Družina	"Koniec sveta"	14.7%	5
5	Soňa	"Skús ma viesť"	17.7%	1
6	Marcel and Tomáš Palonder feat. Street Dance Academy	"Slová slov"	3.4%	8
7	Otto Weiter and Makar Čudra	"Vrtká"	2.3%	10
8	Miro Jaroš	"Bez siedmeho neba"	16.3%	2
9	Happyband	"Mafiánska"	2.9%	9
10	Aya	"Do neba volám"	15.7%	3

==== Semi-finals ====
The two semi-finals took place on 14 and 21 February 2010. The top six entries as determined by the combination of votes from a public televote and a jury panel advanced to the final. The jury that voted in the two semi-finals consisted of Ľubica Čekovská (composer), Janko Lehotský (singer) and Martin Sarvaš (lyricist, manager of the band Tublatanka which represented Slovakia in 1994).

Semi-final 1 – 14 February 2010
R/O	Artist	Song	Jury	Televote		Total	Place
R/O	Artist	Song	Jury	Percentage	Points	Total	Place
1	Marián Bango	"Ty tu ticho spíš"	4	6.8%	8	12	6
2	Mayo	"Tón"	9	4.8%	5	14	4
3	Kristina	"Horehronie"	12	31.2%	12	24	1
4	Petra Humeňanská	"Rosa rosí"	5	1.9%	1	6	11
5	Róbert Mikla	"Voda a oheň"	1	11.1%	10	11	9
6	Pavol Remenár, Klára and Liquid Error	"Figaro"	7	6.6%	7	14	3
7	Renáta Čonková and Martina Polievková	"Dúha"	8	4.7%	4	12	8
8	Michaella	"O nás"	3	3.1%	2	5	12
9	Richard Čanaky and FBI	"Zlomené krídla"	2	7.0%	9	11	10
10	Robo Opatovský	"Niečo máš"	10	4.5%	3	13	5
11	Get Explode	"Blue Sun"	6	6.5%	6	12	7
12	Miro Jaroš	"Bez siedmeho neba"	11	12.0%	11	22	2

Semi-final 2 – 21 February 2010
R/O	Artist	Song	Jury	Televote		Total	Place
R/O	Artist	Song	Jury	Percentage	Points	Total	Place
1	Soňa	"Skús ma viesť"	5	13.0%	11	16	4
2	Horská chata	"Myslíš, že vieš kto som"	6	3.7%	1	7	11
3	Martin Konrád	"Ja viem"	2	8.5%	7	9	9
4	Dáška Kostovčik and Peter Bič Project	"Dážď"	8	6.7%	4	12	7
5	Peter Bažík	"Paradise vs Babylon"	4	6.9%	5	9	10
6	Alone	"Strašne mi chýbaš"	1	5.8%	3	4	12
7	Smola a hrušky	"Pridaj si ma"	9	5.6%	2	11	8
8	Martina Schindlerová	"Môžeš ísť"	7	7.8%	6	13	5
9	Free Voices	"Z osnov"	3	9.1%	9	12	6
10	Tomáš Bezdeda	"Na strechách domov"	10	9.7%	10	20	2
11	Aya	"Do neba volám"	12	9.0%	8	20	3
12	Mista	"Emotions"	11	14.2%	12	23	1

==== Final ====
The final was set to take place on 28 February 2010, however it was rescheduled to 27 February 2010 instead following the recent success of the Slovak men's ice hockey team at the 2010 Winter Olympics. The twelve entries that qualified from the semi-finals competed and the combination of votes from a public vote and a jury panel selected "Horehronie" performed by Kristina as the winner. The jury that voted in the final consisted of Ľubica Čekovská (composer), Janko Lehotský (singer) and Martin Sarvaš (lyricist, manager of the band Tublatanka which represented Slovakia in 1994).

In addition to the performances of the competing entries, guest performers included Maltese singer Claudia Faniello performing "Samsara", and 2001 and 2006 Maltese entrant Fabrizio Faniello performing "No I Can Do". Kristina and Mista were tied at 23 points each but since Kristina received the most votes from the public she was declared the winner.

Final – 27 February 2010
R/O	Artist	Song	Jury	Televote		Total	Place
R/O	Artist	Song	Jury	Percentage	Points	Total	Place
1	Kristina	"Horehronie"	11	37.6%	12	23	1
2	Free Voices	"Z osnov"	1	2.6%	3	4	12
3	Robo Opatovský	"Niečo máš"	5	2.1%	2	7	10
4	Martina Schindlerová	"Môžeš ísť"	4	3.1%	4	8	8
5	Aya	"Do neba volám"	9	5.3%	8	17	4
6	Marián Bango	"Ty tu ticho spíš"	2	4.5%	5	7	9
7	Tomáš Bezdeda	"Na strechách domov"	8	7.4%	9	17	3
8	Mista	"Emotions"	12	16.5%	11	23	2
9	Miro Jaroš	"Bez siedmeho neba"	10	5.0%	6	16	5
10	Soňa	"Skús ma viesť"	3	9.8%	10	13	7
11	Mayo	"Tón"	6	0.8%	1	7	11
12	Pavol Remenár, Klára and Liquid Error	"Figaro"	7	5.2%	7	14	6

== At Eurovision ==
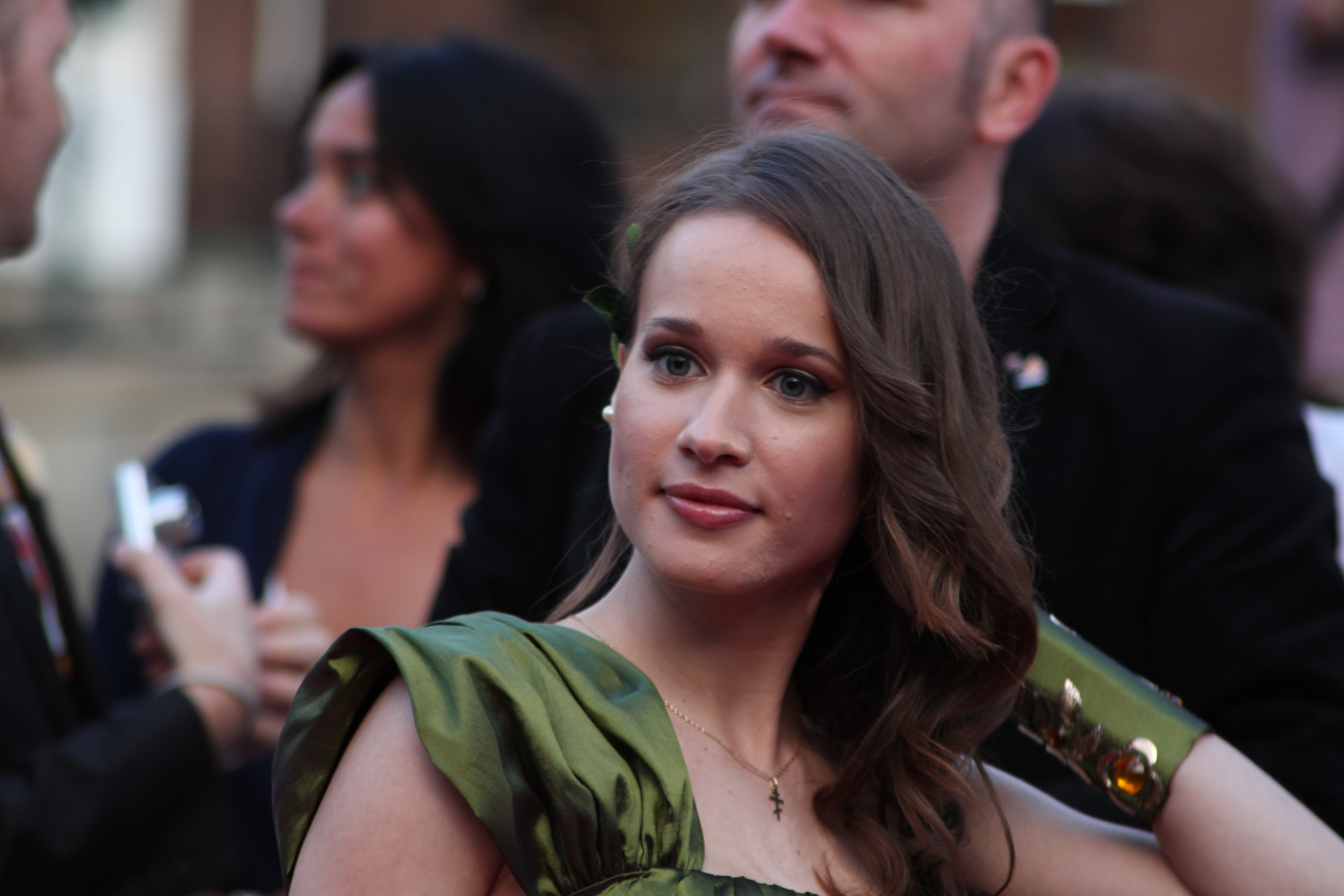
Kristina at the Eurovision Opening Party in Oslo

According to Eurovision rules, all nations with the exceptions of the host country and the "Big Four" (France, Germany, Spain and the United Kingdom) are required to qualify from one of two semi-finals in order to compete for the final; the top ten countries from each semi-final progress to the final. The European Broadcasting Union (EBU) split up the competing countries into six different pots based on voting patterns from previous contests, with countries with favourable voting histories put into the same pot. On 7 February 2010, a special allocation draw was held which placed each country into one of the two semi-finals. Slovakia was placed into the first semi-final, to be held on 25 May 2010.

The running order for the semi-finals was decided through another draw on 23 March 2010 and Slovakia was set to perform in position 4, following the entry from Estonia and before the entry from Finland. Despite being one of the pre-contest favourites, at the end of the first semi-final, Slovakia was not announced among the top 10 entries in the first semi-final and therefore failed to qualify to compete in the final. It was later revealed that Slovakia placed sixteenth in the semi-final, receiving a total of 24 points. Slovakia was placed fourteenth by the public with 34 points and sixteenth by the juries with 25 points.

The two semi-finals and the final were broadcast in Slovakia on Dvojka with commentary by Roman Bomboš. The Slovak spokesperson, who announced the top 12-point score awarded by Slovakia during the final, was Ľubomír Bajaník.

=== Voting ===
Voting during the three shows involved each country awarding points from 1-8, 10 and 12 as determined by a combination of 50% national jury and 50% televoting. Each nation's jury consisted of five music industry professionals who are citizens of the country they represent. This jury judged each entry based on: vocal capacity; the stage performance; the song's composition and originality; and the overall impression by the act. In addition, no member of a national jury was permitted to be related in any way to any of the competing acts in such a way that they cannot vote impartially and independently. The members that comprised the Slovak jury were: Juraj Čurný, Dezider Kukoľ, Ľubica Čekovská, Marcel Palonder and Mirka Brezovská.

Below is a breakdown of points awarded to Slovakia and awarded by Slovakia in the first semi-final and grand final of the contest. The nation awarded its 12 points to Malta in the semi-final and to Germany in the final of the contest.

==== Points awarded to Slovakia ====
Points awarded to Slovakia (Semi-final 1)
Score	Country
12 points	
10 points	
8 points	
7 points	
6 points	Serbia
5 points	Bosnia and Herzegovina; Iceland; Portugal
4 points	
3 points	
2 points	Finland
1 point	Belgium

==== Points awarded by Slovakia ====
Points awarded by Slovakia (Semi-final 1)
Score	Country
12 points	Malta
10 points	Belgium
8 points	Greece
7 points	Iceland
6 points	Serbia
5 points	Bosnia and Herzegovina
4 points	Portugal
3 points	Belarus
2 points	Finland
1 point	Macedonia

Points awarded by Slovakia (Final)
Score	Country
12 points	Germany
10 points	Belgium
8 points	Israel
7 points	Denmark
6 points	Russia
5 points	Greece
4 points	Armenia
3 points	Norway
2 points	Cyprus
1 point	Romania
