= Patriot (Tublatanka album) =

Studio album by Tublatanka
- Released: May 12, 2005
- Recorded: March 23 – April 26, 2005
- Genre: Soft rock
- Length: 52:09
- Label: EMI
- Producer: Juraj Kupec

Tublatanka chronology
Pánska jazda (2001)	Patriot (2005)	Vianočný deň (2006)

Patriot is a studio album by the Slovak rock band Tublatanka, released on 17 May 2010.

== Track listing ==
1. "Cítim sa fajn" (Maťo Ďurinda / Martin Sarvaš) - 4:02
2. "Život s tebou" (Maťo Ďurinda) - 3:41
3. "Cesta snov" (Maťo Ďurinda ) - 3:46
4. "Panika" (Maťo Ďurinda) - 3:21
5. "Mimozemský hlas" (Maťo Ďurinda) - 4:34
6. "Mesto nesplnených snov" (Maťo Ďurinda) - 4:19
7. "Neverná láska" (Maťo Ďurinda) - 4:14
8. "Snenie" (Juraj Kupec / Martin Sarvaš) - 3:48
9. "Ja sa mám" (Maťo Ďurinda / Miroslav Jurika, Marián Brezáni) - 3:11
10. "Veľký deň" (Juraj Topor / Martin Sarvaš) - 3:04
11. "Čierny dážď" (Maťo Ďurinda / Miroslav Jurika, Marián Brezáni) - 3:53
12. "Hej hej mama" (Maťo Ďurinda / Vlado Krausz) - 2:44
13. "Pieseň pre Doda" (Šlabikár VIII.)“ - (Maťo Ďurinda / Martin Sarvaš) - 3:58
14. "Zostaň aspoň chvíľu" (Maťo Ďurinda) - 3:36

== Credits ==
- Maťo Ďurinda – lead vocals, guitar
- Peter Schlosser – bass guitar
- Juraj Topor – drums
- Salko – keyboards
