= Skúsime to cez vesmír =

Studio album by Tublatanka
- Released: 1987
- Recorded: OPUS studios in Bratislava, Slovakia, SK
- Genre: Heavy metal
- Length: 47:12
- Label: Opus Records
- Producer: Milan Vašica

Tublatanka chronology
Tublatanka (1985)	Skúsime to cez vesmír (1987)	Žeravé znamenie osudu (1988)

Skúsime to cez vesmír (which translates to Flying through the Universe) is the second album by Slovak rock band Tublatanka released in 1987 by Opus Records. It contains the hit singles Skúsime to cez vesmír and Dnes.

== Track listing ==
1. "Vo veľkej škole dní"
2. "Šlabikár II"
3. "Neváham..."
4. "Dotyk rúžom na pohár"
5. "Skúsime to cez vesmír"
6. "Dnes"
7. "Mám byť iný"
8. "Veľké nádeje"
9. "Už som váš"
10. "Tuláčik s dobrou povesťou"
- Lyrics written by Martin Sarvaš
- Music written by Maťo Ďurinda

== Credits ==
BAND

- Maťo Ďurinda - lead vocals (except on "Neváham"), lead and rhythm guitars, piano
- Palo Horváth - bass guitar, backing vocals, lead vocals on "Neváham", co-lead vocals on tracks 1, 2, 5, 6, 8
- Ďuro Černý - drums, percussion

Guests

- Braňo Černák, Peter Uherčík, Paľo Sevský, Dušan Horecký, Peter Sámel, Jano Kuric, Peter Penthor, Robo Stanke, Ľubo Bočev, Tomáš Krnáč, Miro Binder, Peter Peteraj, Bohuš Dobál, Igor Skovay, Karol Vilček, Sergej Michalič, Maroš Hnidiak, Vlado Mrazko, Dušan Králik, Ilja Thurzo, Fedor Šrobár, Vít Fila, Jožo Hanák - backing vocals on "Vo veľkej škole dní"

== See also ==
- The 100 Greatest Slovak Albums of All Time
