= Žeravé znamenie osudu =

Studio album by Tublatanka
- Released: 1988
- Recorded: Bratislava, Slovakia, SK
- Genre: Hard rock, heavy metal
- Length: 47:33
- Label: Opus
- Producer: Július Kinček

Tublatanka chronology
Skúsime to cez vesmír (1987)	Žeravé znamenie osudu (1988)	Nebo - peklo - raj (1990)

Žeravé znamenie osudu (which translates to The Blazing Sign of Destiny) is the third studio album by Slovak rock band Tublatanka, which was released in 1988, by Opus Records. It contains the hit singles "Láska, drž ma nad hladinou" and "Pravda víťazí" (the latter which became the anthem for the Velvet Revolution). "Pravda víťazí" is featured in the 2005 horror film Hostel, directed by Eli Roth.

== Track listing ==
Source: Official website

All lyrics are written by Martin Sarvaš; all music is composed by Maťo Ďurinda.

No.	Title	Length
1.	"Prišiel môj čas (My time has come)"
2.	"Stojím, padám (I'm standing, I'm falling)"
3.	"Šlabikár III (Syllabary III)"
4.	"Pravda víťazí (The Truth Wins)"
5.	"Láska, drž ma nad hladinou (Love, hold me above the surface)"
6.	"Žeravé znamenie osudu (The Blazing Sign of Destiny)"
7.	"Prometeus (Prometheus)"
8.	"Rock do civilu (Rock to People)"
9.	"Stúpam (I Rise)"
10.	"Môj starý dobrý kabát (My Old Good Coat)"

== Credits ==
BAND

- Maťo Ďurinda – lead vocals, guitars, piano
- Palo Horváth – bass guitar, backing vocals, lead vocals on "Stojím, padám", "Prometeus" and pre-chorus of "Pravda víťazí"
- Ďuro Černý – drums, percussion
