= Nebo – Peklo – Raj =

Nebo - Peklo - Raj

Studio album by Tublatanka
- Released: 1990
- Recorded: Bratislava, Slovakia, SK
- Genre: Heavy metal
- Length: 44:36
- Label: Supraphon Records
- Producer: Alexander Soldán

Tublatanka chronology
Žeravé znamenie osudu (1988)	Nebo - Peklo - Raj (1990)	Volanie divočiny (1992)

Nebo – Peklo – Raj (which translates to Heaven - Hell - Paradise) is the fourth studio album by the Slovak rock band Tublatanka released in 1990 by Supraphon Records. It contains the hit singles Matka and Démon Pomsty. This was also their first album to contain songwriting input from another member of the band, whereas previous three albums were composed solely by Ďurinda.

== Track listing ==
All lyrics by Martin Sarvaš except "Ilúzia" by Palo Horváth. Music as noted.

1. "Démon pomsty" (Ďurinda)
2. "Viem kam ísť" (Horváth)
3. "Smrť a sláva" (Ďurinda)
4. "Šlabikár IV" (Ďurinda)
5. "Matka" (Ďurinda)
6. "Nebezpečie života" (Ďurinda)
7. "Dám ti viac" (Horváth)
8. "Emigrantská pieseň" (Ďurinda)
9. "Ilúzia" (Horváth)
10. "Bol som dlho preč" (Horváth)
11. "Nebo peklo raj" (Ďurinda)

== Credits ==
=== Band ===
- Maťo Ďurinda - vocals (1, 4–6, 8, 11) lead, rhythm and acoustic guitar, piano
- Palo Horváth - bass guitar, vocals (2, 3, 7, 9, 10)
- Ďuro Černý - drums, percussion

=== Other ===
- Andy Hryc - spoken word (1)
