= Tublatanka (album) =

Studio album by Tublatanka
- Released: 1985
- Recorded: Bratislava, Slovakia, SK
- Genre: Hard rock
- Length: 52:22
- Label: Opus
- Producer: Milan Vašica

Tublatanka chronology
Tublatanka (1985)	Skúsime to cez vesmír (1987)

Tublatanka is the self-titled debut album of the Slovak rock band Tublatanka released in 1985 by Opus Records. It contains the hit singles Šlabikár and O nás.

Up until 2005 album Patriot (and excluding their first Christmas album Poďme bratia do Betlema), this was the band's only album on which all lead vocals were performed by Ďurinda. All other releases between this record and Patriot have at least one song sung by either bass guitarist Pavol Horváth or guitarist Dodo Dubán, depending on which one was in the band at that time.

== Track listing ==
1. "Šlabikár" (Syllabary)
2. "Dajte mi na to liek" (Give me medicine for it)
3. "Máme to zrátané" (We have it all figured out)
4. "Som rád, že ťa stretnem len náhodou" (I'm glad to meet you just by chance)
5. "Rieka" (River)
6. "Kúpim si kilo lásky" (I'll buy a kilo of love)
7. "Mám rád veci nemožné" (I like impossible things)
8. "O nás" (About us)
9. "Priateľ" (Friend)
10. "Zajtra" (Tomorrow)
11. "Schody do seba" (Stairs into each other)
- Lyrics written by Martin Sarvaš
- Music written by Maťo Ďurinda

== Credits ==
BAND

- Maťo Ďurinda - Lead Vocals, Lead/Rhythm Guitar, Acoustic Guitar, Piano
- Palo Horváth - Bass Guitar, Backing vocals
- Ďuro Černý - Drums, Percussion
