= Svet v ohrození =

Studio album by Tublatanka
- Released: May 17, 2010
- Recorded: February 15–March 29, 2010
- Genre: Hard rock, soft rock
- Label: Monitor-EMI

Tublatanka chronology
Vianočný deň (2006)	Svet v ohrození (2010)

Svet v ohrození (which translates to The World in Danger) is the eleventh studio album by the Slovak rock band Tublatanka, released on 17 May 2010.

== Track listing ==
1. "Svet v ohrození" (Maťo Ďurinda, Mirka Ďurindová) - 6:02
2. "Revolúcia" (Maťo Ďurinda) - 4:48
3. "Pekelný vlak" (Maťo Ďurinda, Mirka Ďurindová) - 5:52
4. "Lietam vo výškach" (Maťo Ďurinda, Mirka Ďurindová) - 5:26
5. "Svätý Grál" (Maťo Ďurinda, Mirka Ďurindová) - 4:57
6. "Zmysel lásky" (Maťo Ďurinda, Mirka Ďurindová) - 4:35
7. "Malý blázon" (Maťo Ďurinda) - 3:56
8. "Stratený svet" (Maťo Ďurinda, Mirka Ďurindová) - 5:39
9. "Šlabikár IX" (Maťo Ďurinda, Martin Sarvaš) - 4:59
10. "Môj domov" (Mirka Ďurindová) - 4:52
11. "Dobrá správa" (Juraj Topor, Martin Sarvaš) - 3:52
12. "Nechaj to tak" (Maťo Ďurinda, Mirka Ďurindová) - 4:05
13. "Stres" (Maťo Ďurinda) - 4:16
14. "S tebou anjel môj" (Maťo Ďurinda, Mirka Ďurindová) - 4:34

== Credits ==
- Maťo Ďurinda - lead vocals, guitar, piano
- Juraj Topor - bass guitar
- Peter Schlosser - drums
