= Martin Ďurinda =

Slovak musician (born 1961)

Maťo Ďurinda
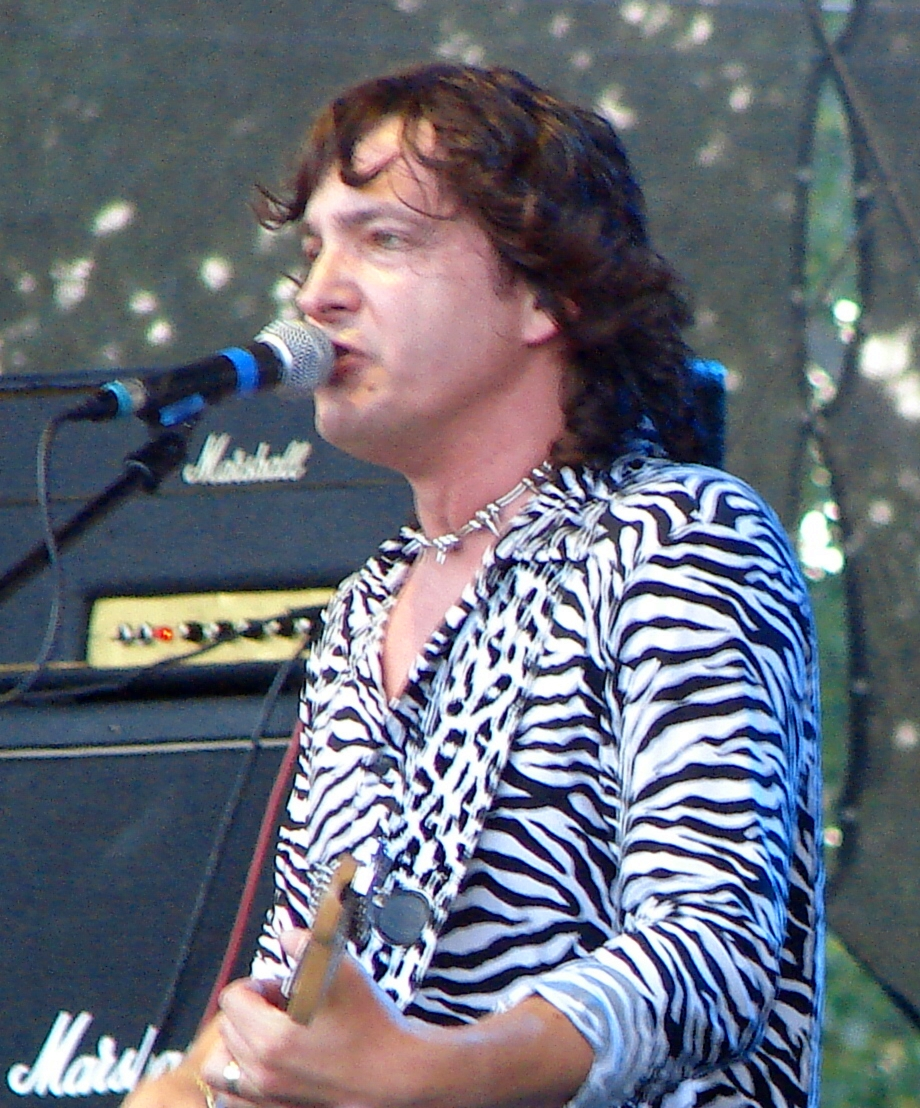
- Ďurinda performing in 2009

Background information
- Born: Martin Ďurinda; 8 November 1961 (age 64); Bratislava, Czechoslovakia
- Origin: Czechoslovakia
- Genres: Heavy metal; hard rock; alternative
- Occupations: Musician; songwriter
- Instruments: Vocals; piano; guitar; bass
- Years active: 1985–present
- Label: EMI Czech Republic
- Member of: Tublatanka
- Formerly of: Nervy
- Website: tublatanka.sk

Martin "Maťo" Ďurinda (born 8 November 1961) is the vocalist and guitarist of the Slovak hard rock/heavy metal band Tublatanka. His hometown is Bratislava, Slovakia.

== Biography ==
In his youth, Ďurinda had aspirations of becoming a hockey player while teaching himself to play guitar and piano. He learned to sing from his mother, who was a high school music teacher. Between 1977 and 1980, he was a member of the pop group Nervy. In 1982, he enrolled at Comenius University in Bratislava, where he majored in pharmacy. It was there that he met Juraj Černý and Pavol Horváth, and they formed the band Tublatanka. The group represented Slovakia at the Eurovision Song Contest 1994 in Dublin with the song "Nekonečná pieseň". In 1997, Ďurinda released the solo album Perfektný svet.

== Discography ==
=== with Tublatanka ===
Studio albums

- Tublatanka (1985)
- Skúsime to cez vesmír (1987)
- Žeravé znamenie osudu (1988)
- Nebo – peklo – raj (1990)
- Volanie divočiny (1992)
- Poďme bratia do Betlehema (1993)
- Znovuzrodenie (1994)
- Pánska jazda (2001)
- Patriot (2005)
- Vianočný deň (2006)
- Svet v ohrození (2010)
- Uprostred chaosu (2023)

Compilations

- Neverending Song (six-track rare CD composed of Czech and English mixes of the track "Neverending Song", issued on the occasion of the band's participation in the Eurovision contest) (1994)
- Najvačšie hity No.1 – Pravda víťazí (1996)
- Najvačšie hity No.2 – Ja sa vrátim! (1998)
- Láska útočí (credited as Maťo Ďurinda, Tublatanka) (2002)
- Zlatá Tublatanka – 20 rockov (2003)
- Gold (credited as Tublatanka, Maťo Ďurinda) (2006)
- Najvačšie hity No.3 – Cítim sa fajn (2012)

=== Solo ===
- Perfektný svet (1997)

== See also ==
- The 100 Greatest Slovak Albums of All Time
