= Pánska jazda =

Studio album by Tublatanka
- Released: November 5, 2001
- Recorded: September 22 – December 10, 2001
- Genre: Pop rock
- Length: 55:43
- Label: Monitor-EMI

Tublatanka chronology
| Znovuzrodenie (1995) | Pánska jazda (2001) | Patriot (2005) |

Pánska jazda (which translates to Stag Party) is the eighth studio album by the Slovak rock band Tublatanka, released in 2001. It was their second album with Juraj Topor and Dodo Dubán (for whom this was also the last album), and the only one with drummer Martin Uherčík and without any lyrical input from Martin Sarvaš.

== Track listing ==
1. Protipóly (Maťo Ďurinda / M. Jurika - M. Brezány) - 2:59
2. Zostaň so mnou (Maťo Ďurinda / Maťo Ďurinda) - 3:36
3. Láska útočí (Maťo Ďurinda / M. Jurika - M. Brezány) - 3:20
4. Slnko nad hlavou (Maťo Ďurinda / Maťo Ďurinda) - 4:13
5. Šikmooká (Maťo Ďurinda / M. Jurika - M. Brezány) - 3:37
6. Kráľ a kráľovná (Maťo Ďurinda / Maťo Ďurinda) - 3:22
7. Volám ťa (Maťo Ďurinda / Maťo Ďurinda) - 4:44
8. Kam mám ísť (Maťo Ďurinda / Maťo Ďurinda) - 4:08
9. Nechceš žiť opustený (Maťo Ďurinda / Maťo Ďurinda) - 3:14
10. Rána nocí prebdených (J. Dubán / M. Maček) - 3:19
11. Len dieťa ma naučí (Maťo Ďurinda / Maťo Ďurinda) - 3:13
12. Starý film (Maťo Ďurinda / M. Murga) - 3:27
13. Falošná bábika (Maťo Ďurinda / Maťo Ďurinda) - 4:06
14. Šlabikár VII. (Maťo Ďurinda / V. Balek ) - 4:48
15. Vráť ten deň (J. Topor - J. Dubán / J. Topor) - 3:37

== Lineup ==
- Maťo Ďurinda - lead vocals, lead guitar
- Dodo Dubán - guitar, lead vocals on "Rána nocí prebdených" and "Vráť ten deň"
- Juraj Topor - bass guitar
- Martin Uherčík - drums
