= Ľubica Čekovská =

Slovak composer and pianist

Ľubica Čekovská (Humenné) is a Slovak composer and pianist.

== Biography ==
Čekovská studied at the Academy of Performing Arts in Bratislava and the Royal Academy of Music in London. Her works have been featured at ISCM World Music Days festivals (2009, Sweden; 2013, Slovakia) and Prague Spring festivals (2006, 2013, 2015). She was awarded the Ján Levoslav Bella Prize for her piano concerto Two Portraits (2003), and the 2012 SOZA Award for international performances of Slovak music.

Čekovská works in a variety of genres, including composing for film, television, and theatre. She is represented by the German music publisher Bärenreiter.

Her latest opera, Impresario Dotcom, was commissioned for the Bregenzer Festspiele in 2020, but postponed due to the coronavirus outbreak. Čekovská then created a special abridged version for the restructured Festtage im Festspielhaus event in August 2020.

== Awards ==
- 1998 Royal Academy of Music - The Cuthbert Nunn Composition Prize
- 1998-2000 The Queen Elizabeth Scholarship Trust
- 2000 Royal Academu of Music -The Leverhulme Award
- 2004 Music Fund Slovakia - Ján Levoslav Bella Prize
- 2011-2012 SOZA Award
- 2013 Tatrabanka Fundation Award
- 2020 Krištáľové krídlo
- 2021 Slovakian Minister of Culture’s Prize for 2020
- 2023 Dosky prize for Impresario Dotcom
- 2023 Prešov Self-Governing Region prize
- 2024 Tatrabanka Fundation Award for opera Here I am, Orlando

== Works ==
Čekovská assigned opus numbers to early works, but stopped using them after Op. 12 in 2000.

=== Operas ===
- As Time Goes By (2005)
  - Collaborative work by Čekovská, Marius Baranauskas, Age Hirv, Marios Joannou Elia, and Sean Reed. Libretto by Xavier Zuber. Premiered 29 September 2005, Staatsoper Hannover
- Dorian Gray (2013)
  - Opera in 3 acts. Libretto by Kate Pullinger after the novel by Oscar Wilde. Premiered 8 November 2013, Bratislava. Slovak National Theatre, cond. Christopher Ward
- Impresario Dotcom (2020)
  - Opera buffa in 4 acts. Libretto by Laura Olivi after Carlo Goldoni’s L'impresario delle Smirne (1759). Commissioned for the Bregenzer Festspiele, premiered in abridged version 20 August 2020.

=== Orchestral ===
- Turbulence (Op. 11; 2000, rev. 2007)
- Shadow Scale (2006)
- Adorations (2006)
- Dorian Gray Suite (2011)
- Palingenia (2015)
- Etuda (2016)
- Cantus Simplicissimus (2018)

=== Large ensemble ===
- Fragment and Elegies (1997, rev. 2004) – String orchestra
- Piece for String Orchestra (Op. 7; 1999)
- Arctic Descent (Op. 8; 1999) – Woodwind ensemble
- Fractal (Op. 12; 2000) – Chamber orchestra
- Postludium (2005) – Chamber orchestra
- Interrupted Line (2006, rev. 2008) – chamber orchestra
- Theatre Music (2011) – String orchestra

=== Concertos ===
- Concerto Two Portraits (2003) – piano, orchestra
- Violin Concerto (2010)

=== Chamber music and solo instrumental ===
- Composition for Trumpet and Piano (Op. 2; 1997)
- Brown’s Motion (Op. 3; 1997) – flute, bassoon, piano
- Fragment and Elegies (Op. 4; 1997) – solo accordion
- Dark (Op. 5; 1997) – oboe, piano
- One Minute (1997) – solo trombone
- The Song (2002) – cello, piano
- Kuckucks Winterlied (2005) – 4 cellos
- In Conversation (2006) – cello, bayan
- Musica homonensis (2007) – solo organ
- Lux in tenebris (2007) – trumpet, organ
- Duo Concertante (2010) – violin, piano
- Evenodd (2013) – wind quintet
- Nachtigalls Frühlingslied (2014) – 4 cellos
- A Midsummer Quartet (2016) – string quartet
- Fathers Downbeat (2018) – 4 basses, percussion
- Esaje [Essays] (2019) – viola, piano

=== Choral ===
- Close Harmony (1997) – SATB
- On First Looking into Chapman's Homer (Op. 6; 1998) – SATB
- Three Fragments from Stabat Mater (2018) – SSAATTBB
- Liberte (2019) – Mezzo-soprano solo, SATB, orchestra

=== Voice and piano ===
- At Day-Close in November (Op. 9; 1997) – Mezzo-soprano – Text by Thomas Hardy
- Der Tod und das Mädchen (Op. 10; 1997) – Baritone – Text by Matthias Claudius
- Dialogues (2001) – Tenor
- Six Songs (2002) – Soprano

=== Solo piano ===
- Five Miniatures (Op. 1; 1996)
- LaSiFaDo (2007)
- famisi (2007)
- Sonata Tensiona (2009)
- Four Movements (2012)

=== Film and television ===
- Slečna Dušehojivá (2000) – TV movie
- Kruté radosti (2002)
- Kriminálka Staré Město (2010-13) – TV series
- Exponáty alebo príbehy z kaštieľa (2013) – Documentary
- Kolonáda (2013) – TV series
- 38 (2014) – Documentary
- Jak jsme hráli čáru (2014)
- Čakáreň (2014) – Documentary
- Dvojčata (2015) – TV series
- Pirko (2016)
- Dubček (2018)
- Niečo naviac (2018) – Documentary
- Vlci (2018) – TV series
- Nero a Seneca (2019) – TV movie
