= Horehronie (song) =

2010 song by Kristína Peláková

Single by Kristina

from the album V sieti ťa mám
- Released: 10 March 2010
- Recorded: 2010
- Genre: Folk-pop
- Length: 3:00
- Label: H.o.M.E. Production
- Songwriters: Martin Kavulič, Kamil Peteraj
- Producer: Martin Kavulič

Kristina singles chronology
| "Stonka" (2009) | "Horehronie" (2010) | "Tak si pustim svoj song" (2010) |

Eurovision Song Contest 2010 entry
- Country: Slovakia
- Artist: Kristina
- Language: Slovak
- Composer: Martin Kavulič
- Lyricist: Kamil Peteraj

Finals performance
- Semi-final result: 16th
- Semi-final points: 24

Entry chronology
- ◄ "Leť tmou" (2009)
- "I'm Still Alive" (2011) ►

"Horehronie" is a Slovak pop song, composed by Martin Kavulič with lyrics by poet Kamil Peteraj and performed by Kristina, and it was the Slovak entry at the Eurovision Song Contest 2010. It was performed together with backing vocalist Hana Servická and dancers Martin Mikulášek, Peter Živner, David Schwimmer & Slavomír Kolkovič. The song is an ode to the Horehronie tourism region. It became the winner of the Slovak national final Eurosong 2010 on 27 February, getting the largest share of the televote and coming second in the jury vote.

The song failed to qualify to the Eurovision Song Contest 2010 grand final from the first semifinal on 25 May, reaching 16th place out of 17. However, a large amount of Slovaks and the Eurovision community view this as the best entry Slovakia has sent to the contest.

== Track listing ==
Versions of the track were released as a CD single.

| No. | Title | Length |
|---|---|---|
| 1. | "Horehronie (Radio Edit)" | 3:00 |
| 2. | "Horehronie (Extended)" | 4:40 |
| 3. | "Horehronie (Acoustic Version)" | 4:01 |
| 4. | "Horehronie (KaMa Remix Radio Edit)" | 3:41 |
| 5. | "Horehronie (KaMa Remix Extended)" | 6:35 |
| 6. | "Horehronie (CJ Macintosh & MamboDJ Sirius Club Remix)" | 6:40 |
| 7. | "Horehronie (Karaoke)" | 3:00 |
| 8. | "Stonka (Radio Edit)" | 3:28 |
| 9. | "Stonka (Acoustic Version)" | 3:38 |
| 10. | "Stonka (KaMa Remix Radio Edit)" | 3:20 |
| 11. | "Stonka (KaMa Remix Extended)" | 6:31 |
| 12. | "Horehronie (Explicit)" |
| Total length: | | 48:31 |

== Covers ==
Reggae band from New Zealand, Cornerstone Roots, made a cover of Horehronie in 2010. The band played this song together with Slovak reggae group Medial Banana on Uprising Reggae Festival in Slovakia that year.

On 13 April 2025, at the London Eurovision pre-party, ADONXS, that year's Czech representative at Eurovision, performed a cover of the song due to his Slovak origins.

== Charts ==
| Chart (2010) | Peak position |
|---|---|
| Czech Airplay Chart | 30 |
| Slovak Airplay Chart | 1 |
