= Tublatanka =

Slovak rock band

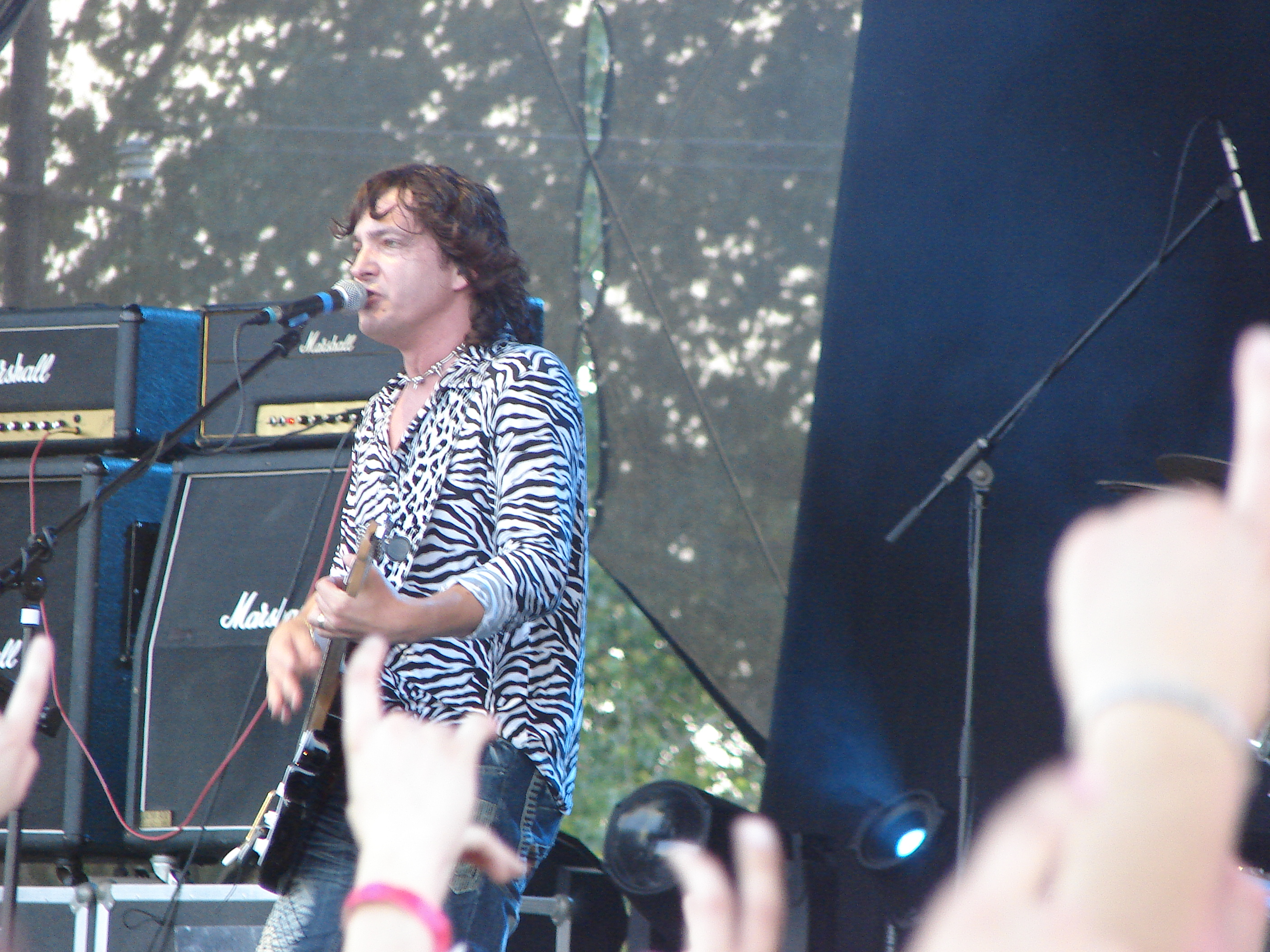
- Maťo Ďurinda performing with Tublatanka in 2009

Background information
- Origin: Bratislava, Slovakia
- Genres: Heavy metal; Alternative; Hard rock
- Years active: 1982–present
- Labels: OPUS (1985–1989); Supraphon (1990); Tommü (1991–1993); Monitor/EMI Czech Republic (1994–present)
- Members: Maťo Ďurinda; Juraj Topor; Peter Schlosser
- Past members: Juraj Černý; Palo Horváth; Jozef Dubán; Martin Uherčík
- Website: tublatanka.sk

Tublatanka is a Slovak rock band formed in the autumn of 1982 in Bratislava, best known for the hits "Pravda víťazí" and "Dnes". The band's classic lineup consisted of Maťo Ďurinda, Palo Horváth, and Juraj "Ďuro" Černý, from 1982 to 1992. In 1992, Horváth left the band. Ďuro left the band in 1995 due to complications with drugs. Currently, the band consists of Ďurinda, Juraj Topor, and Peter Schlosser.

== Biography ==
=== Early years ===
Tublatanka was formed in 1982 in Bratislava, Slovakia, by Martin "Maťo" Ďurinda, Palo Horváth, and Ďuro Černý. Ďurinda was a student at Comenius University in Bratislava at the time, where he met drummer Ďuro Černý in a wine bar called Veľkí Františkáni through a friend. The two talked about their favorite bands such as Led Zeppelin, Deep Purple, Thin Lizzy, Nazareth, the Who, Yes, Pink Floyd, etc. After much discussion, they decided to form a rock trio similar their heroes Cream, Jimi Hendrix, and ELP (Emerson, Lake, and Palmer). They knew they would need a very talented bassist.

Černý remembered seeing a talented and charismatic bassist named Palo Horváth playing in a band called Mentol, so they decided to visit him at his flat in a district of Bratislava called Dúbravka. The three hit it off and decided to jam together for the first time, and eventually, they formed a band together. The trio began practicing and writing songs on the fourth floor of Ďurinda's campus building until Ďurinda finished his schooling. With more and more songs being written, the band wanted to sing in a style that everyone could relate to so they approached Martin Sarvaš, who was a student of architecture and a good friend of Ďuro Černý, to help write lyrics. Sarvaš was a lyricist for a band Černý previously played in.

They began to perform in bars on most evenings around Bratislava and became quite popular with the crowds. Eventually, they made a demo tape, gave it to Sarvaš, and began shopping around for a record label. Sarvaš became their manager and created the band's image. While getting intoxicated in Veľkí Františkáni, Černý and Ďurinda thought of their band name. Černý wanted to call the band Tublat (which is the name of an evil ape in the Tarzan books), but this name was mocked by crowds while they played. They eventually decided on Tublatanka as a combination of Tublat and Moravanka (a former local band they admired). Another version, given by Ďuro Černý in an interview for the newspaper SME, is that a driver for the band suggested they call themselves Tublatanka, as a combination of Tublat and a parody of local wind ensembles, whose names invariably ended in -anka.

=== 1980s mainstream success ===
On 30 January 1983, there was a festival for amateur bands in PKO Bratislava (park of culture and relaxation) that was organized by Richard Müller under the title "Mladá vlna 82", where Tublatanka had an opportunity to appear as an opening act. The band had a notable unexpected success and the director of the Slovak Record Label OPUS, Milan Vašica, who was sitting in the audience, offered the boys to record their first big self-titled LP. The album sold over 100,000 copies in the first few months after it was released, so OPUS offered to record their second album, Skúsime to cez vesmír, which came out a year later. While recording that album, Ďurinda was called to do his basic military service, much to his dismay, since he wanted to finish recording the album. Skúsime to cez vesmír reached the number one spot on radio charts and the band started their "30-years tour", organized by Jožo Šebo (currently the manager for Jana Kirschner). The band was endowed by a wide range of fans in sold-out concerts in amphitheatres and sport halls. The boys won their first performance on the television program Triangel with their song "O nás" (About Us).

Tublatanka recorded their third album, Žeravé znamenie osudu (Glowing Sign of Fate), in 1988, in the new digital OPUS studio. The album sold 250,000 copies in the first few months and received the "Zlatý erb OPUS-u" (Golden Crest of Opus) award. Tublatanka then played concerts all over Czechoslovakia and the song "Láska, drž ma nad hladinou" was in first place on the Czechoslovak chart Formula Pop for several months. In November 1988, the band was invited to play in a music festival in Moscow that was held at a stadium in Luzhniki, where ten shows were held with an audience of 14,000-15,000 people.

On 16 September 1989, the band held a big concert at an amphitheatre in Bratislava, recorded by a professional film crew. In November 1989, when the Velvet Revolution broke out and the first demonstrations against the Communist Party of Czechoslovakia for democracy began to occur, Ďurinda provided his guitar equipment and installed a sound system in Hviezdoslavovo Square in Bratislava with four PAs and two amplifiers during the first three days of the revolution. The song "Pravda víťazí" became an unofficial anthem of the Velvet Revolution. The song was repeatedly in first place on the music chart of the television program Triangel, and even a videotape under the title "Pravda víťazí", representing the successful concert at the amphitheater in Bratislava, appeared on the market during Christmas. The concert tape was completely sold out.

=== 1990s and lineup change ===
In 1990, Tublatanka left for Jevany to a studio belonging to L. Steidl to record their fourth album, Nebo – peklo – raj. Andy Hryc, an actor who put together an intro to the song "Démon pomsty", gave the album its name at a major show where thousands of people were present. In 1992, the next album was released, entitled Volanie divočiny, which not only featured the lyrics of Sarvaš, but also of Whisky (a Slovak musician who was also a good friend of Ďurinda's).

In 1993, relations between Ďurinda and Horváth began to deteriorate due to creative differences. After a show in Karlsruhe, Germany, Horváth left Tublatanka. As Ďurinda couldn't find anybody to replace Horváth for a long time, he had to take over bass duties while he and Černý recorded their 1993 Christmas album Poďme bratia do Betlehema (Let's Go to Bethlehem, Brothers), which came out during Christmas and became extremely popular around that time. The album was given its name by Silvia Lakatošová, the last Miss Czechoslovakia (On 1 January 1993, Czechoslovakia formally split into two independent countries, the Czech Republic and the Slovak Republic). During this time, Ďuro Černý became addicted to drugs after trying them with his friends from a band he also played with, called Slobodná Európa. Černý was no longer able to play with Tublatanka and left the band in order to begin drug rehab.

Maťo remained the only original member of Tublatanka and had to look for new musicians. He placed an advertisement in the newspaper Nový čas, which proved useless; two interviews took place but nobody from more than 60 musicians was to his liking. Ďurinda finally discovered a guitarist and singer named Jozef "Dodo" Dubán, a graduate of law who became available after leaving the band Money Factor, as well as the bass guitarist Juraj Topor (a fashion show designer), who, as the band's guitar tech, helped Maťo set up for concerts; Topor had also previously played with the band If.

In 1994, Tublatanka began to prepare a new album under the fresh lineup, and they started practicing a new live set. A partly recovered Ďuro Černý rejoined the band and a new CD, Znovuzrodenie, was recorded. This album saw the band experimenting with a sound closer to pop music than their previous material. At the beginning of 1994, the band won a competition on STV and represented their country in the Eurovision Song Contest in Dublin, Ireland, with their song "Nekonečná pieseň". They placed 19th out of 25, so after their return to Slovakia, only negative press and bad reviews welcomed them.

Ďuro Černý left the band once again in 1995 due to his drug addiction, which led to severe health problems. Martin Uherčík replaced Černý in 1995. Shortly after this, the band took a very long break from recording and released two greatest hits CDs that contained a few English versions of songs which had originally been intended for English editions of their classic albums Skúsime to cez vesmír and Žeravé znamenie osudu. During this time, Ďurinda also released a solo album, titled Perfektný svet (Perfect World), which came out in 1997.

=== 2000s ===
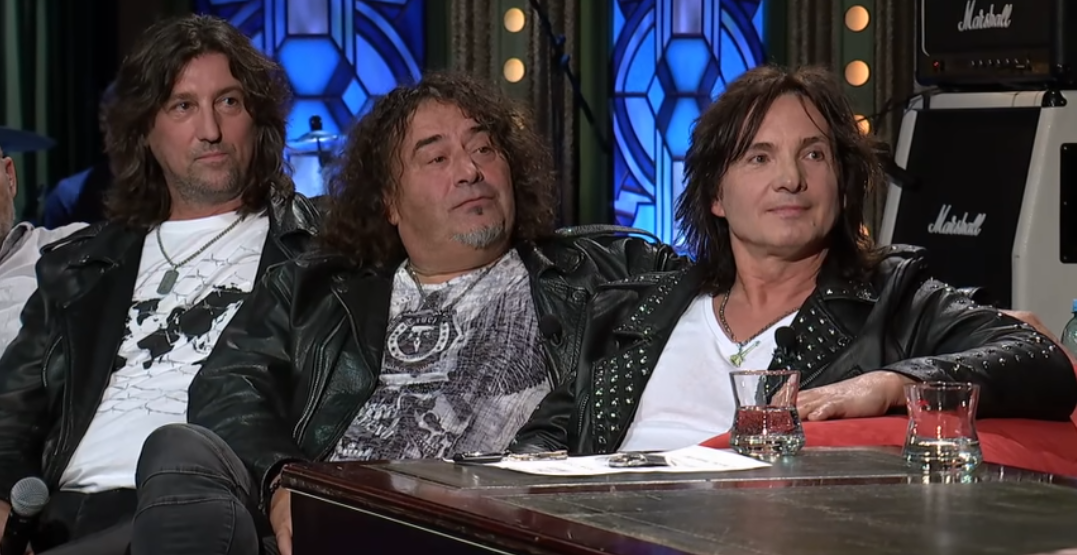
Tublatanka on Show Jana Krause in 2023

In 2001, the band finally recorded and released a new album entitled Pánska jazda (Stag Party). This album did not feature lyrics by their usual lyricist Martin Sarvaš; instead, Ďurinda took over that job. The album transitioned Tublatanka into a more mainstream sound compared to their earlier work.

Martin Uherčík quit the band after Pánska jazda and was replaced by Peter Schlosser. Jozef "Dodo" Dubán committed suicide in 2003. Ďurinda never replaced him but instead decided to continue on as a rock trio once again. After another long successful run of touring, Tublatanka released Patriot in 2005, an album containing 14 new songs and incorporating lyrics by Martin Sarvaš once again. The album also contained a long-awaited tribute to the tragically deceased Dodo Dubán on the track "Pieseň pre Doda" (Song for Dodo). A year after Patriot was released, Tublatanka issued their second Christmas album, Vianočný deň (Christmas Day), to much critical acclaim. The band's eleventh studio album, Svet v ohrození (The World in Danger), came out in May 2010.

Juraj "Ďuro" Černý, the band's original drummer, died in February 2016 at the age of 54 at his home in Hungary. The musician had struggled with health problems for close to twenty years.

== Band members ==
Current

- Maťo Ďurinda – lead vocals, lead/rhythm guitar, piano, bass guitar (1982–present)
- Juraj Topor – bass guitar, vocals (1994–present)
- Peter Schlosser – drums, percussion (2001–present)

Past

- Ďuro Černý – drums, percussion (1982–1994, 1994–1995)
- Palo Horváth – bass guitar, vocals (1982–1993)
- Dušan Giertl – drums, percussion (1994)
- Jozef Dubán – lead/rhythm guitar, vocals (1994–2003)
- Martin Uherčík – drums, percussion (1995–2001)

== Discography ==
Studio albums

- Tublatanka (1985)
- Skúsime to cez vesmír (1987)
- Žeravé znamenie osudu (1988)
- Nebo – peklo – raj (1990)
- Volanie divočiny (1992)
- Poďme bratia do Betlehema (1993)
- Znovuzrodenie (1994)
- Pánska jazda (2001)
- Patriot (2005)
- Vianočný deň (2006)
- Svet v ohrození (2010)
- Uprostred chaosu (2023)

Compilations

- Neverending Song (six-track rare CD composed of Czech and English mixes of the track "Neverending Song", issued on the occasion of the band's participation in the Eurovision Song Contest) (1994)
- Najvačšie hity No.1 – Pravda víťazí (1996)
- Najvačšie hity No.2 – Ja sa vrátim! (1998)
- Láska útočí (credited as Maťo Ďurinda, Tublatanka) (2002)
- Zlatá Tublatanka – 20 rockov (2003)
- Gold (credited as Tublatanka, Maťo Ďurinda) (2006)
- Najvačšie hity No.3 – Cítim sa fajn (2012)
- Najlepšie roky (2020)

DVD

- Live – 25 rockov (2010)
- 30 Rockov – Vo veľkej škole dní (2015)

== See also ==
- The 100 Greatest Slovak Albums of All Time

Awards and achievements
Preceded by None (first time entry)	Slovakia in the Eurovision Song Contest; 1994	Succeeded by Marcel Palonder with "Kým nás máš"
