= Kristína (singer) =

Slovak singer (born 1987)

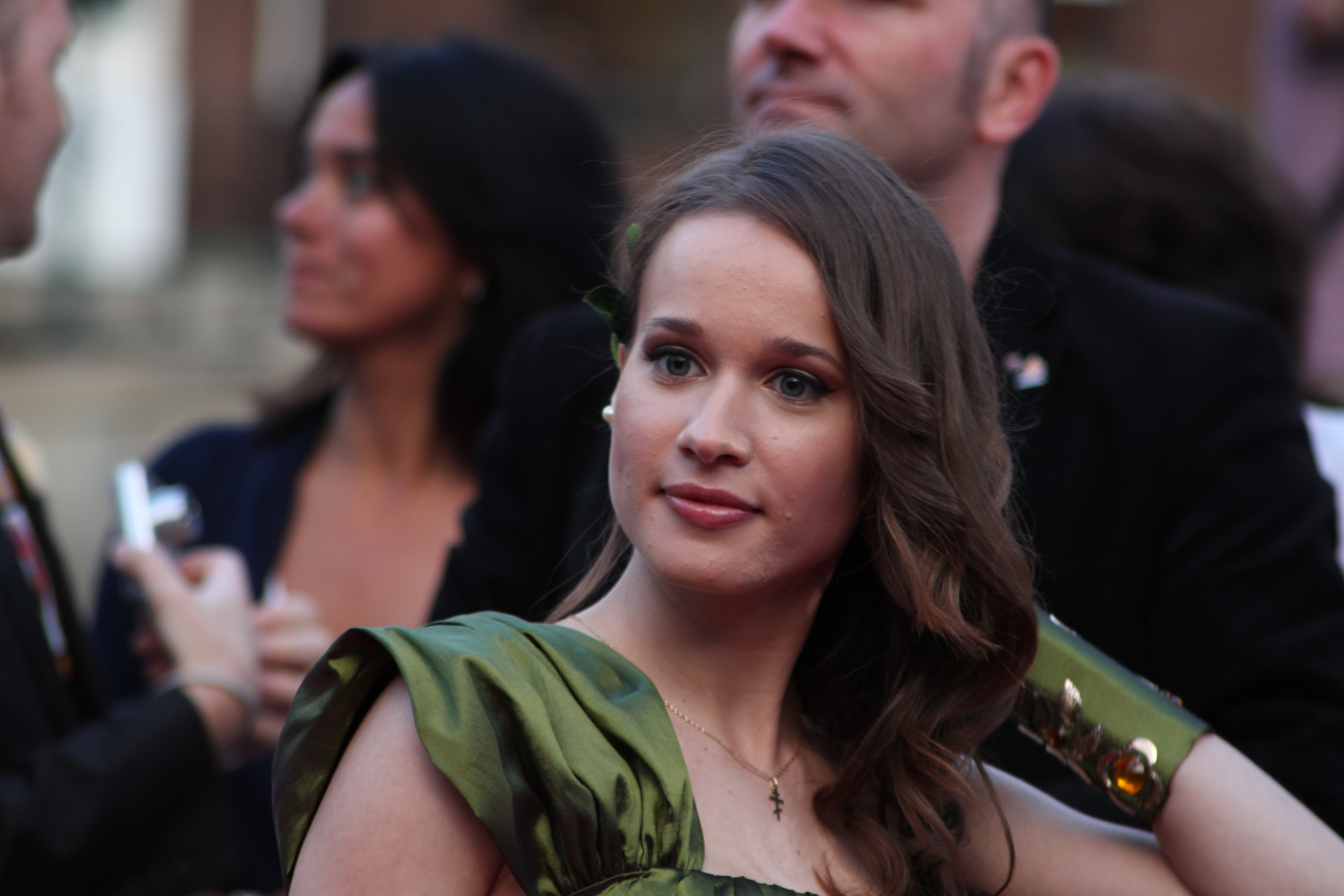
- Kristína in Oslo in 2010

Background information
- Also known as: Kristína
- Born: Kristína Peláková; 20 August 1987 (age 39); Svidník, Czechoslovakia
- Origin: Košice, Slovakia
- Genres: Pop
- Occupation: Singer
- Instruments: Vocals, Piano
- Years active: 2007–present
- Labels: H.o.M.E. Production, Brjan Music
- Website: http://kristinamusic.sk/

Kristína Peláková (born 20 August 1987), known professionally as Kristína, is a Slovak singer. She is best known for representing Slovakia in the Eurovision Song Contest 2010 with the song “Horehronie”. The song placed 16th in the semi-final with a total of 24 points. Kristína is one of the most popular female artists in Slovakia and the Czech Republic, and has toured both countries on multiple occasions.

Kristína started her career as a child singer, dancer and piano player in Svidník, Slovakia. Following the advice of her music teacher, she took singing as her major and attended the Conservatoire (Music School) in Košice. While studying, her favourite place in town was the Jazz Club, where she met Martin Kavulič. He became her producer and helped her to secure a contract with the record label H.o.M.E. Production.

Kristína’s debut single was "Som tvoja" featuring the rapper Opak, released in 2007. Her next single, named "Vráť mi tie hviezdy" became a hit in Slovakia the following year. Her début album "....ešte váham" was released in 2008.

In October 2010, her single "V sieti ťa mám" reached number one on the Slovak airplay chart, making it her third chart-topping single after "Horehronie" earlier that year and "Stonka" in 2009. In October 2010, she released her second studio album, also titled "V sieti ťa mám". It was well received by critics, who praised its contemporary production. Her single “Life Is A Game” was the official song of the 2011 IIHF World Championship, held in Slovakia.

Since appearing at Eurovision, Kristína has continued to release music, including the compilation album “Tie Naj” in 2014. The album included the hit singles "Rozchodový reggaeton" and "Ta ne" which became her first top ten single in Poland. “Tie Naj” was subsequently certified platinum in Slovakia.

In 2017, Kristína released her fifth album “Mať Srdce” which included the Slovak top-ten singles “Si pre mňa best” and “Láska bombová”. This was followed by her first children's album “Snívanky”, released in 2020.

== Career ==
=== 2010: Eurovision Song Contest ===
Kristína won the national selection to represent Slovakia in the Eurovision Song Contest 2010 with her song "Horehronie". She got the largest share of television votes and came second in the jury vote. The title of the song, "Horehronie", refers to a rural region in Slovakia. The lyrics of the song tell the story of a heartbroken girl who finds solace in nature. The song was composed by her long-time producer Martin Kavulič. The song peaked at number one on the Slovak airplay chart and became a very popular hit in Slovakia. Despite this, Kristína failed to qualify from the Eurovision Song Contest 2010 semi-final finishing in 16th place. The music video for the song is one of the most viewed on the Eurovision YouTube channel.

=== 2015: Tanec Snov ===
In 2015, she was part of Slovak dancing competition Tanec snov, where she was paired with dancer Karol Kotlár and finished as runner-up.

Week #	Dance/Song	Judges' score				Result
Week #	Dance/Song	Guest judge	Ďurovčík	Máziková	Modrovský	Result
1	Waltz/ "Unchained Melody"	6	4	6	4	No Elimination
2	Quickstep/ "You're the One That I Want"	8	6	7	6	Safe
3	Jive/"Marry You"	9	7	7	7	Safe
4	Samba/"Ai Se Eu Te Pego"	10	8	10	9	Safe
5	Slowfox/"The Pink Panther Theme"; Jive/"Let's Twist Again"	9; 10	6; 5	7; 8	7; 8	Safe
6	Salsa/"Conga"; Rumba/"Když muž se ženou snídá"	10; 10	8; 4	9; 7	9; 7	Safe
7 Semi-final	Cha-cha-cha/"Hey! Baby"; Folklore/Slovak traditional music	10; 10	8; 8	9; 10	9; 9	Safe
8 Final	Showdance/"A Little Less Conversation"; Samba/"Ai Se Eu Te Pego"; Sandungueo/"Crazy in Love"	10; 10; 10	9; 10; 9	9; 10; 10	9; 10; 10	Runner-up

== Discography ==
=== Albums ===
- ....ešte váham (2008)
- V sieti ťa mám (2010)
- Na slnečnej strane sveta (2012)
- Tie Naj (2014)
- Mať Srdce (2017)
- Snívanky (2020)

=== Singles ===
Year	Single	Peak chart positions					Album
Year	Single	CZ		SK		PL	Album
Year	Single	50	100	50	100	40	Album
2007	"Som tvoja"	—	—	13	34	—	....ešte váham
2008	"Vráť mi tie hviezdy"	—	—	4	6	—	....ešte váham
2008	"Ešte váham"	5	59	6	—	—	....ešte váham
2009	"Stonka"	5	28	1	4	—	V sieti ťa mám
2010	"Horehronie"	2	30	1	1	—	V sieti ťa mám
2010	"Tak si pustím svoj song"	—	—	4	27	—	V sieti ťa mám
2010	"V sieti ťa mám"	19	—	1	1	—	V sieti ťa mám
2010	"Vianočná nálada"	43	—	1	10	—	V sieti ťa mám
2011	"Pri oltári"	7	33	1	10	—	V sieti ťa mám
2011	"Tajná láska"	—	—	10	63	—	V sieti ťa mám
2011	"Life Is A Game"	—	—	2	13	—	non-album single
2012	"Jabĺčko"	6	24	13	—	—	Na slnečnej strane sveta
2012	"Viem lebo viem"	—	—	4	7	—	Na slnečnej strane sveta
2013	"Život je vždy fajn"	20	94	6	68	—	Tie Naj
2014	"Rozchodový reggaeton"	16	68	12	94	—	Tie Naj
2014	"Navždy"	—	—	8	69	12	Tie Naj
2014	"Ta ne"	—	—	4	32	3	Tie Naj
2015	"Na bieleho kona"	—	—	7	47	—	Mať Srdce
2016	"Si pre mňa best"	39	—	5	43	—	Mať Srdce
2016	"Láska bombová"	42	—	3	39	—	Mať Srdce
2016	"Vianočná jahoda"	43	—	—	—	—	Mať Srdce
2017	"Mať srdce"	—	—	12	72	—	Mať Srdce
2017	"Sympatie"	—	—	—	—	—	non-album singles
2019	"Ked nam dvom je do spevu"	—	—	—	—	—	non-album singles
2020	"Na dlani"	—	—	—	—	—	non-album singles
2022	"Oceán"	—	—	—	—	—	non-album singles
2023	"Pre Teba"	—	—	—	—	—	non-album singles

=== Other charted songs ===
Year	Single	Peak positions				Album
Year	Single	CZ		SK		Album
Year	Single	50	100	50	100	Album
2012	"Ovoňaj ma ako ružu"	—	—	16	—	Na slnečnej strane sveta
2012	"Ľudskosť"	—	—	28	—	Na slnečnej strane sveta
2014	"Letím v duši"	—	—	10	—	Tie Naj
2014	"Obyčajná žena"	39	—	12	—	non-album single

== Tours ==
- 2010-12: Horehronie Tour (Czech Republic and Slovakia)

Preceded by Kamil Mikulčík and Nela Pocisková with Leť tmou	Slovakia in the Eurovision Song Contest; 2010	Succeeded by TWiiNS with I'm Still Alive
