= Max Jason Mai =

Slovak singer (born 1988)

Miro Šmajda
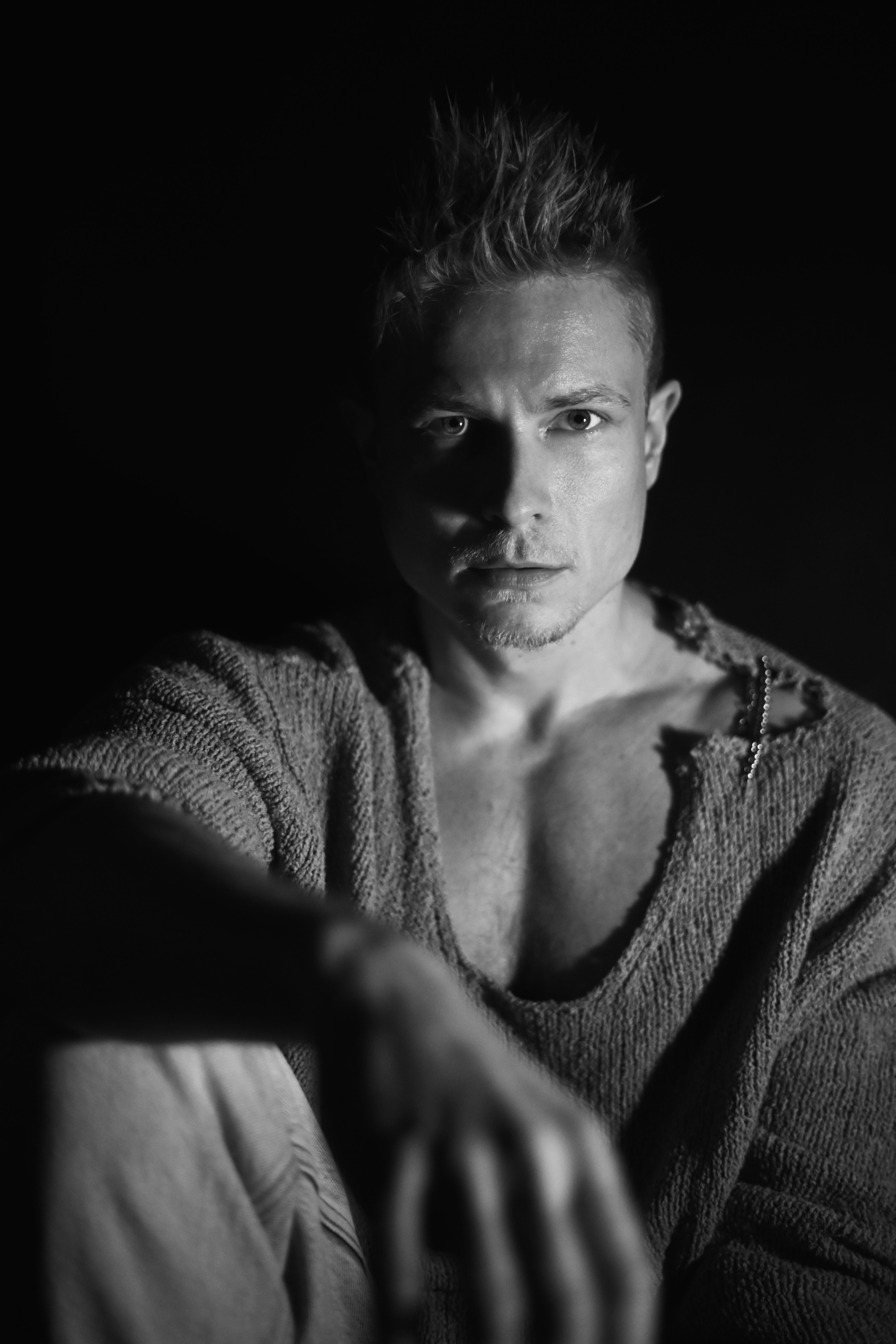
- Šmajda in 2024

Background information
- Also known as: MYO
- Born: Miroslav Šmajda; 27 November 1988 (age 37); Košice, Czechoslovakia
- Genres: Pop, rock
- Occupations: Singer-Songwriter, Photographer
- Instrument: Vocals
- Years active: 2009–present
- Website: http://www.mirosmajda.com

Miro Šmajda (also known as MYO and Max J Mai, born 27 November 1988) is a Slovak singer and photographer living in Prague. He represented Slovakia in the Eurovision Song Contest 2012 with the song "Don't Close Your Eyes".

== Life and career ==
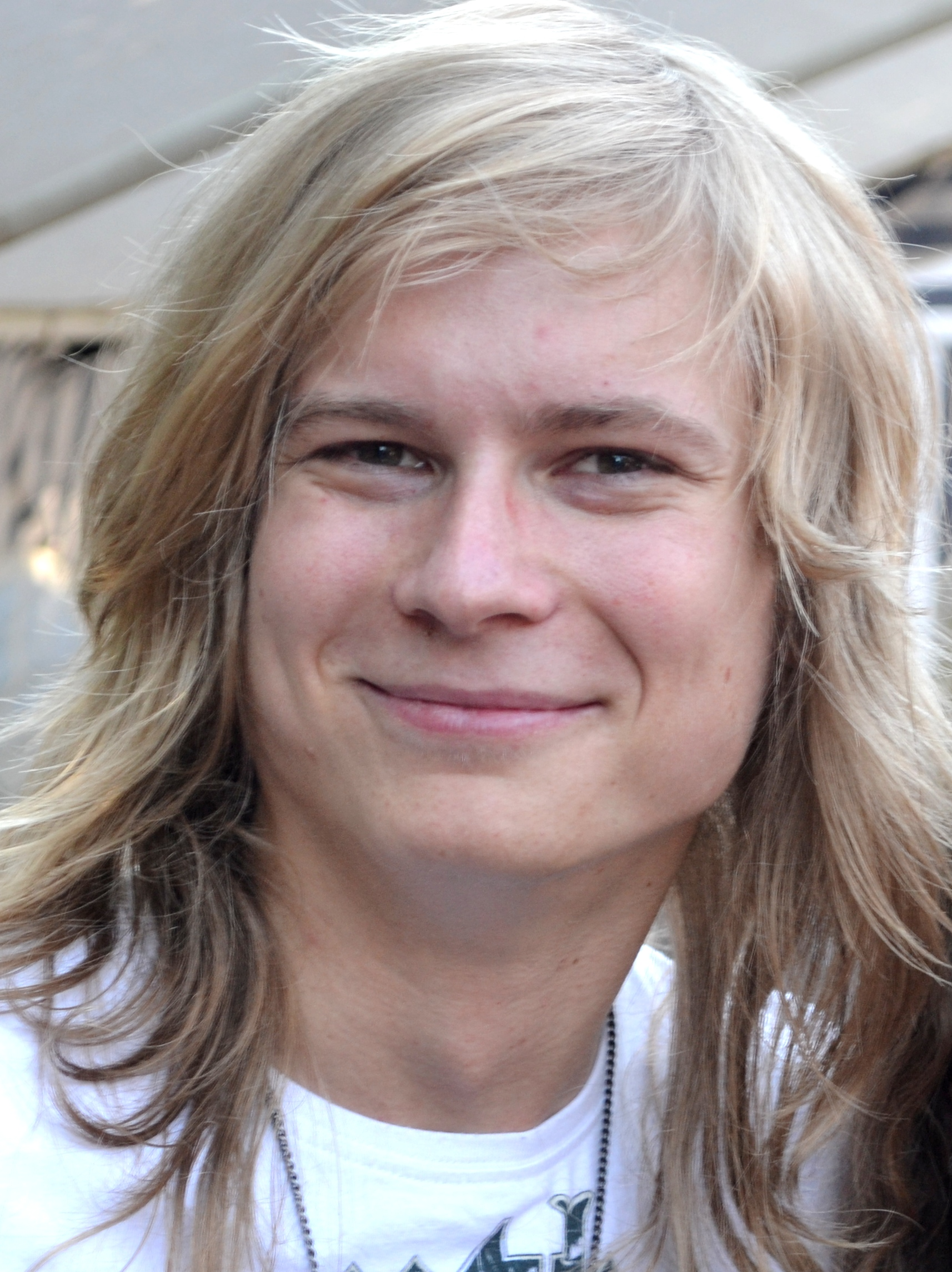
Šmajda in 2013

Šmajda grew up in eastern Slovakia with his mom, his father is Czech. Šmajda finished in second place in the Czech and Slovak casting show SuperStar in 2009. In November 2010, he released his first solo album Čo sa týka lásky (lit. 'Regarding Love') and in 2013 his second album Mirosmajda.com. With Terrapie, Mai released a titular debut album in 2015, after which he collaborated with Czech rock-band Walda Gang with the album Je Tu Léto.

In November 2011, RTVS announced that Mai was picked to represent his homeland in the Eurovision Song Contest 2012. He sang "Don't Close Your Eyes" under his stage name Max Jason Mai the same year in Baku and finished in 18th (last) place in the semi-final, thus failing to make the grand final. Additionally, he was the last representative of Slovakia at Eurovision, as the country withdrew from Eurovision the following year.

== Discography ==
=== Albums ===
Solo albums

- Čo sa týka lásky (2010)
- Mirosmajda.com (2013)

Albums with bands

- Terrapie (2015)
- Je tu Léto feat. Walda Gang (2018)
- Terrapie (2021)

=== Singles ===
Solo singles

- "Last Forever"
- "Baby"
- "Pod vodou"
- "Loneliness"
- "Nostalgie"
- "Každý Deň"
- "Miluj"
- "Don't Close Your Eyes" (as MAXJMAI)

Terrapie singles

- "Narkoman"
- "Do Pekla Jo"
- "Sněhurva"
- "Tam Život Je Fajn"
- "Pán Prctenů"
- "Až Roztaje Sníh"
