= Marcel Palonder =

Slovak singer (born 1964)

Marcel Palonder (born 3 February 1964 in Humenné, Czechoslovakia) is a Slovak singer. He represented his country in the Eurovision Song Contest 1996 with the song "Kým nás máš". His song qualified from the semifinal, and it placed 18th place with 19 points in the final, receiving points from four other countries: four points from Greece, eight points from Malta, five points from Poland and two points from Spain. As of 2026, this remains the best result Slovakia has ever achieved in Eurovision.

He attempted to represent his country once again at Eurovision in 2010, when he competed in the Slovak quarter-finals of Eurosong 2010 with the song "What About You", but failed reaching the semi-finals.

== See also ==
- The 100 Greatest Slovak Albums of All Time

Awards and achievements
Preceded by Tublatanka with "Nekonečná pieseň"	Slovakia in the Eurovision Song Contest; 1996	Succeeded by Katarína Hasprová with "Modlitba"
