= Slovakia in the Eurovision Song Contest 2009 =

- Eurovision Song Contest 2009
- Participating broadcaster: Slovenská televízia (STV)
- Country: Slovakia
- Selection process: Eurosong 2009
- Selection date: 8 March 2009

Competing entry
- Song: "Leť tmou"
- Artist: Kamil Mikulčík and Nela Pocisková
- Songwriters: Rastislav Dubovský; Petronela Kolevská; Anna Žigová

Placement
- Semi-final result: Failed to qualify (18th)

Participation chronology

Slovakia was represented at the Eurovision Song Contest 2009 with the song "Leť tmou", written by Rastislav Dubovský, Petronela Kolevská, and Anna Žigová, and performed by Kamil Mikulčík and Nela Pocisková. The Slovak participating broadcaster, Slovenská televízia (STV), announced in September 2008 that it would return to the contest after an eleven-year absence, and would select its entry through the national final Eurosong 2009. 50 entries competed in the national final which consisted of six shows: five semi-finals and a final. Entries were selected to advance from the semi-finals based on the votes of a seven-member jury panel as well as the votes from the public. Sixteen entries ultimately qualified to compete in the final on 8 March 2009 where a public televote selected three of the entries to proceed to a second round of voting. In the second round of voting, "Leť tmou" performed by Kamil Mikulčík and Nela Pocisková was selected as the winner after scoring the most points from the jury.

Slovakia was drawn to compete in the second semi-final of the Eurovision Song Contest which took place on 14 May 2009. Performing during the show in position 7, "Leť tmou" was not announced among the top 10 entries of the second semi-final and therefore did not qualify to compete in the final. It was later revealed that Slovakia placed eighteenth out of the 19 participating countries in the semi-final with 8 points.

== Background ==
Prior to the 2009 contest, Slovenská televízia (STV) had participated in the Eurovision Song Contest representing Slovakia three times since its first entry in 1994. Its best placing in the contest was eighteenth, achieved in 1996 with the song "Kým nás máš" performed by Marcel Palonder. Its least successful result has been 21st place, which they have achieved in 1998 with the song "Modlitba" performed by Katarína Hasprová.

As part of its duties as participating broadcaster, STV organises the selection of its entry in the Eurovision Song Contest and broadcasts the event in the country. The broadcaster had selected all of its Eurovision entries through an internal selection. In 1999, Slovakia was relegated as one of the seven countries with the lowest average scores over the previous five years, while in 2000, STV withdrew from the competition, citing financial reasons. On 24 September 2008, STV announced their return to the Eurovision Song Contest in 2009 after an eleven-year absence. The program director of STV Roman Lipták stated that the pressure from local artists was the driving force behind the broadcaster's return.

== Before Eurovision ==
=== Eurosong 2009 ===
The logo of Eurosong 2009

Eurosong 2009 was the national final format developed by STV in order to select its entry for the Eurovision Song Contest 2009. The competition consisted of six shows which commenced on 15 February 2009 and concluded with a final on 8 March 2009. The six shows took place at the STV studios in Bratislava and hosted by Martin Rausch. All shows in the competition were broadcast on Jednotka as well as online at the broadcaster's official website stv.sk.

==== Format ====
The format of the competition consisted of six shows: five semi-finals on 15 February 2009, 20 February 2009, 22 February 2009, 27 February 2009 and 1 March 2009, and a final on 8 March 2009. Results during each show were determined by a jury panel and votes from the public. The semi-finals each featured ten entries from which the songs first faced a public televote where the top two entries qualified to the final. The jury then selected an additional qualifier from the remaining entries to advance. The jury also selected a wildcard qualifier for the final out of the remaining non-qualifying acts from the semi-finals. In the final, the winner was determined over two rounds of voting. In the first round, the remaining sixteen entries faced a public televote where the top three entries qualified to the second round of voting. In the second round, the winner was determined exclusively by the jury. Viewers were able to vote via SMS.

The seven-member jury panel participated in each show and selected entries to advance in the competition. The jury consisted of:

- Laco Lučenič – musician
- Katarína Hasprová – singer, represented Slovakia in the Eurovision Song Contest 1998
- Marcel Palonder – singer, represented Slovakia in the Eurovision Song Contest 1996
- Anton Popovič – composer
- Mirka Brezovská – singer
- Dezider Kukoľ – music editor at the News Agency of the Slovak Republic (TASR)
- Lukáš Machala – representative of STV

==== Competing entries ====
Artists and composers were able to submit their entries between 20 November 2008 and 20 January 2009. Artists were required to hold Slovak citizenship and songs were required to be performed in Slovak. The broadcaster received 177 submissions at the closing of the deadline and an expert committee selected fifty entries for the competition. The competing entries were announced on 3 February 2009.

Artist	Song	Songwriter(s)
Alena Kortis	"Zbláznený za láskou"	Ján Kortis
Alone	"Nezistím"	Michel Cabala, Rasto Toman, Richard Labovský, Dodo Slíž
Anawi	"V predstavách"	Peter Sanchés, Ivana Novotna
Andrea Zimányiová	"Prines si ten kľúč"	Juraj Burian, Peter Konečný
Babenky a týpci	"Babenky a týpci"	Vašo Patejdl, Miro Jurika, Marián Brezáni
Barbora Balúchová and Red Rose	"Nakoniec"	Jimi Cimbala, Miroslav Jurika
Dáša Šarközyová	"Krídla"	Vašo Patejdl, Dáša Šarközyová
Desmod and Lucia Nováková	"Posledná minúta"	Desmod, Roman Slávik
Dolores	"Kto nám slabým odpustí"	Slavomír Repaský, Jaroslav Kuba, V. Mikláš
ENS	"Už je čas"	Ľuboš Korčok, Z. Majeská
Editor	"Pod parou"	Lubomir Šimo, Milan Jakubik
EmSoft	"Násilie"	Stanislav Valigura, Peter Tomi
G-Strinx	"Rytmus vášne"	Stano Herko, Karol Bertók
Golden Storm	"Daj mi len deň"	Stano Šimor, Daniel Mikletič
Golden Vein	"Chcem nevedieť"	Patrik Lago, Milan Eliáš
Hudba z Marsu	"Na hubách"	Michal Štofej
Ivana Kováčová	"Všetko"	Ján Kulich, Jozef Engerer
Jakub Petraník	"Nadomnou"	Brunno Oravec, Miro Jurika
Janais	"Taram ta rej"	Janais Kothajova
Kamil Mikulčík and Nela Pocisková	"Leť tmou"	Rastislav Dubovský, Petronela Kolevská, Anna Žigová
Katka Koščová	"Pri sebe"	Katarína Koščová, Daniel Špiner, Ján Štrasser
Komajota	"7 nocí"	Martin Husovský, Michal Baláž
Marek Kravjar	"Geniálny cvok"	Roman Slávik
Mária Čírová	"Búrka"	Mária Círová, Maroš Kachút
Martina Schindlerová	"Krídla"	Ján Štrasser, Janko Lehotský
Metalinda	"Chcem pre teba žiť"	Peter Sámel
Michal Chrenko	"Proti prúdom"	Jimmy Cimbala, Miroslav Jurika, Marián Brezáni
Miro Jaroš	"Miesto kam patríme"	Miro Jaroš
Milan Lieskovský feat. Peter Bulík and Janka Bajnoci	"Bliss"	Milan Lieskovský
Mukatado	"Ja sa mám"	Jana Kozáková, Peter Dobrik
Natália Hatalová	"Spím"	Milo Suchomel, Peter Konečný
Nocaden	"Na čo asi myslíš"	Robert Kopina
Palo Drapák	"Kričím na svätých"	Palo Drapák, Juraj Žák
PapaJam	"Nemusíš sa báť"	Jana Chochrumová, Marek Vozár
Peter Bažík and Andrea Súlovská	"Nebudem stáť"	Peter Bažik
Peter Cmorík Band	"Keď spíš"	Peter Cmorík
Peter Kotuľa	"Cesty sú stratené"	Peter Kotuľa, Karol Bertok
Petra Kepeňová	"Odkedy nie si"	Petra Kepeňová
Quasimondo	"16 barov"	Marián Jaslovský, Roland Kanik
Robo Opatovský	"Prší"	Juraj Žák, Robo Opatovský
Robo Papp	"Nádej máme"	Vlado Čulík
Robo Šimko and MassRiot	"Môj anjel spí"	Miroslav Jurika, Marian Brezáni
Roman Galvánek	"Láska z papiera"	Roman Galvánek
Samo Tomeček and Free Inna Cage	"To čo chceš"	Samuel Tomeček, Lukáš Duchovič, Ján Kmet
Smola a hrušky	"Na čom záleží"	Jozef Kramár
TH13TH	"Všetko je inak"	Rasťo Řezáč, Igor Hudcovský
Tomáš Bezdeda	"Každý z nás"	Tomáš Bezdeda
VIP	"Hviezdy"	Laco Jakubčiak
Zachariáš Hubáček	"Bolo bolo"	Miro Tásler, Zachariáš Hubáček
Zuzana Haasová and Funny Fellows	"V mojej zime"	Roman Féder, Zuzana Haasová

==== Semi-finals ====
The five semi-finals took place between 15 February and 1 March 2009. The third semi-final was originally scheduled to take place on 22 February 2009, however the show was postponed to 23 February due to a train accident in Bratislava on 21 February which led to a day of mourning in Slovakia. Desmod and Lucia Nováková were due to perform in the first semi-final, however they were later reallocated to perform in the fifth semi-final following an accident during the rehearsals. Three entries qualified to the final from each semi-final. The competing entries first faced a public televote where the top two songs advanced; an additional qualifier was then selected from the remaining entries by the jury.

Following the semi-finals, "To čo chceš" performed by Samo Tomeček and Free Inna Cage received the jury wildcard and also qualified for the final, while Desmod and Lucia Nováková withdrew from the final after qualifying from the fifth semi-final; the jury selected "Na čom záleží" performed by Smola a hrušky as a replacement qualifier.

Public vote qualifier Jury qualifier Wildcard qualifier

Semi-final 1 – 15 February 2009
R/O	Artist	Song	Televote	Place
1	Alone	"Nezistím"	6.5%	6
2	Petra Kepeňová	"Odkedy nie si"	19.0%	3
3	Robo Papp	"Nádej máme"	6.4%	7
4	EmSoft	"Násilie"	4.4%	8
5	Peter Kotuľa	"Cesty sú stratené"	6.6%	5
6	VIP	"Hviezdy"	3.5%	9
7	Andrea Zimányiová	"Prines si ten kľúč"	20.5%	1
8	Robo Šimko and MassRiot	"Môj anjel spí"	19.4%	2
9	Hudba z Marsu	"Na hubách"	13.7%	4

Semi-final 2 – 20 February 2009
R/O	Artist	Song	Televote	Place
1	Babenky a týpci	"Babenky a týpci"	17.01%	3
2	Mária Čírová	"Búrka"	17.07%	2
3	Jakub Petraník	"Nadomnou"	1.86%	10
4	Golden Storm	"Daj mi len deň"	11.27%	5
5	Samo Tomeček and Free Inna Cage	"To čo chceš"	15.22%	4
6	Editor	"Pod parou"	7.59%	6
7	Mukatado	"Ja sa mám"	5.00%	7
8	Marek Kravjar	"Geniálny cvok"	1.97%	9
9	Anawi	"V predstavách"	4.81%	8
10	Tomáš Bezdeda	"Každý z nás"	18.20%	1

Semi-final 3 – 23 February 2009
R/O	Artist	Song	Televote	Place
1	Komajota	"7 nocí"	6.1%	6
2	Katka Koščová	"Pri sebe"	7.7%	4
3	Milan Lieskovský feat. Peter Bulík and Janka Bajnoci	"Bliss"	7.6%	5
4	Peter Bažík and Andrea Súlovská	"Nebudem stáť"	20.8%	2
5	Roman Galvánek	"Láska z papiera"	2.4%	10
6	Ivana Kováčová	"Všetko"	4.7%	7
7	ENS	"Už je čas"	4.1%	8
8	Dáša Šarközyová	"Krídla"	3.1%	9
9	G-Strinx	"Rytmus vášne"	17.8%	3
10	Robo Opatovský	"Prší"	25.8%	1

Semi-final 4 – 27 February 2009
R/O	Artist	Song	Televote	Place
1	Barbora Balúchová and Red Rose	"Nakoniec"	5.03%	8
2	Nocaden	"Na čo asi myslíš"	2.59%	10
3	Golden Vein	"Chcem nevedieť"	5.78%	6
4	Quasimondo	"16 barov"	3.39%	9
5	Zachariáš Hubáček	"Bolo bolo"	5.75%	7
6	Zuzana Haasová and Funny Fellows	"V mojej zime"	11.61%	3
7	Palo Drapák	"Kričím na svätých"	7.23%	5
8	Janais	"Taram ta rej"	20.61%	2
9	Miro Jaroš	"Miesto kam patríme"	10.82%	4
10	Martina Schindlerová	"Krídla"	27.18%	1

Semi-final 5 – 1 March 2009
R/O	Artist	Song	Televote	Place
1	~~Desmod and Lucia Nováková~~	~~"Posledná minúta"~~	~~27.97%~~	~~2~~
2	PapaJam	"Nemusíš sa báť"	0.65%	11
3	Michal Chrenko	"Proti prúdom"	2.35%	7
4	TH13TH	"Všetko je inak"	1.60%	8
5	Natália Hatalová	"Spím"	1.02%	9
6	Metalinda	"Chcem pre teba žiť"	4.72%	4
7	Alena Kortis	"Zbláznený za láskou"	0.88%	10
8	Dolores	"Kto nám slabým odpustí"	3.99%	5
9	Smola a hrušky	"Na čom záleží"	2.39%	6
10	Kamil Mikulčík and Nela Pocisková	"Leť tmou"	28.25%	1
11	Peter Cmorík Band	"Keď spíš"	26.18%	3

==== Final ====
The final took place on 8 March 2009 where the sixteen entries that qualified from the semi-finals competed. The winner was selected over two rounds of voting. In the first round, the top three entries as determined by a public televote advanced to the second round, the superfinal. In the superfinal, the jury selected "Leť tmou" performed by Kamil Mikulčík and Nela Pocisková as the winner. In addition to the performances of the competing entries, guest performers included 2009 Azerbaijani Eurovision entrants Aysel and Arash performing "Always", and 2009 Czech Eurovision entrant Gipsy.cz performing "Aven Romale".

Final – 8 March 2009
R/O	Artist	Song	Televote	Place
1	VIP	"Hviezdy"	0.33%	16
2	Andrea Zimányiová	"Prines si ten kľúč"	1.51%	14
3	Robo Šimko and MassRiot	"Môj anjel spí"	1.54%	13
4	Zachariáš Hubáček	"Bolo bolo"	0.97%	15
5	Martina Schindlerová	"Krídla"	5.98%	5
6	Mukatado	"Ja sa mám"	14.73%	3
7	Tomáš Bezdeda	"Každý z nás"	15.10%	2
8	Robo Opatovský	"Prší"	5.13%	6
9	Smola a hrušky	"Na čom záleží"	4.46%	9
10	Peter Bažík and Andrea Súlovská	"Nebudem stáť"	2.20%	10
11	Janais	"Taram ta rej"	2.47%	8
12	Mária Čírová	"Búrka"	14.60%	4
13	Kamil Mikulčík and Nela Pocisková	"Leť tmou"	25.27%	1
14	Michal Chrenko	"Proti prúdom"	1.59%	12
15	Komajota	"7 nocí"	2.11%	11
16	Samo Tomeček and Free Inna Cage	"To čo chceš"	4.00%	7

Superfinal – 8 March 2009
R/O	Artist	Song	Place
1	Kamil Mikulčík and Nela Pocisková	"Leť tmou"	1
2	Tomáš Bezdeda	"Každý z nás"	3
3	Mukatado	"Ja sa mám"	2

== At Eurovision ==
According to Eurovision rules, all nations with the exceptions of the host country and the "Big Four" (France, Germany, Spain and the United Kingdom) are required to qualify from one of two semi-finals in order to compete for the final; the top ten countries from each semi-final progress to the final. The European Broadcasting Union (EBU) split up the competing countries into six different pots based on voting patterns from previous contests, with countries with favourable voting histories put into the same pot. On 30 January 2009, an allocation draw was held which placed each country into one of the two semi-finals. Slovakia was placed into the second semi-final, to be held on 14 May 2009.

The running order for the semi-finals was decided through another draw on 16 March 2009 and Slovakia was set to perform in position 8, following the entry from Cyprus and before the entry from Denmark. At the end of the second semi-final, Slovakia was not announced among the top 10 entries in the second semi-final and therefore failed to qualify to compete in the final. It was later revealed that Slovakia placed eighteenth in the semi-final, receiving a total of 8 points.

The two semi-finals and the final were broadcast in Slovakia on Dvojka with commentary by Roman Bomboš. The Slovak spokesperson, who announced the Slovak votes during the final, was Ľubomír Bajaník.

=== Voting ===
The voting system for 2009 involved each country awarding points from 1-8, 10 and 12, with the points in the final being decided by a combination of 50% national jury and 50% televoting. Each nation's jury consisted of five music industry professionals who are citizens of the country they represent. This jury judged each entry based on: vocal capacity; the stage performance; the song's composition and originality; and the overall impression by the act. In addition, no member of a national jury was permitted to be related in any way to any of the competing acts in such a way that they cannot vote impartially and independently.

Below is a breakdown of points awarded to Slovakia and awarded by Slovakia in the second semi-final and grand final of the contest. The nation awarded its 12 points to Azerbaijan in the semi-final and to Estonia in the final of the contest.

==== Points awarded to Slovakia ====
Points awarded to Slovakia (Semi-final 2)
Score	Country
12 points	
10 points	
8 points	
7 points	
6 points	
5 points	
4 points	Albania
3 points	
2 points	Ukraine
1 point	Ireland; Russia

==== Points awarded by Slovakia ====
Points awarded by Slovakia (Semi-final 2)
Score	Country
12 points	Azerbaijan
10 points	Norway
8 points	Estonia
7 points	Moldova
6 points	Ukraine
5 points	Greece
4 points	Albania
3 points	Poland
2 points	Hungary
1 point	Cyprus

Points awarded by Slovakia (Final)
Score	Country
12 points	Estonia
10 points	Norway
8 points	Bosnia and Herzegovina
7 points	United Kingdom
6 points	Iceland
5 points	Israel
4 points	Azerbaijan
3 points	Armenia
2 points	Portugal
1 point	Ukraine

==== Detailed voting results ====
Detailed voting results from Slovakia (Final)
R/O	Country	Results			Points
R/O	Country	Jury	Televoting	Combined	Points
01	Lithuania	3		3	
02	Israel	12		12	5
03	France	2		2	
04	Sweden				
05	Croatia				
06	Portugal	6		6	2
07	Iceland	8	4	12	6
08	Greece		3	3	
09	Armenia	7		7	3
10	Russia				
11	Azerbaijan		10	10	4
12	Bosnia and Herzegovina	4	8	12	8
13	Moldova		1	1	
14	Malta				
15	Estonia	10	6	16	12
16	Denmark				
17	Germany	1		1	
18	Turkey				
19	Albania		2	2	
20	Norway		12	12	10
21	Ukraine		5	5	1
22	Romania				
23	United Kingdom	5	7	12	7
24	Finland				
25	Spain				
