= Eurovision Song Contest 2009 =

International song competition

Coordinates: 55°46′N 37°40′E

Dates and venue
- Semi-final 1: 12 May 2009
- Semi-final 2: 14 May 2009
- Final: 16 May 2009
- Venue: Olimpiyskiy Arena; Moscow, Russia

Organisation
- Organiser: European Broadcasting Union (EBU)
- Executive supervisor: Svante Stockselius

Production
- Host broadcaster: Channel One (C1R)
- Director: Andrei Boltenko
- Executive producer: Yury Aksyuta
- Presenters: Semi-finals: Natalia Vodianova Andrey Malakhov; Final: Ivan Urgant Alsou Abramova

Participants
- Number of entries: 42
- Number of finalists: 25
- Returning countries: Slovakia
- Non-returning countries: Georgia; San Marino
- Participation map: Finalist countries Countries eliminated in the semi-finals Countries that participated in the past but not in 2009

Vote
- Voting system: Each country awarded 12, 10, 8–1 points to their 10 favourite songs.
- Winning song: Norway; "Fairytale"

The Eurovision Song Contest 2009 was the 54th edition of the Eurovision Song Contest. It consisted of two semi-finals on 12 and 14 May presented by Natalia Vodianova and Andrey Malakhov, and a final on 16 May 2009 presented by Ivan Urgant and Alsou Abramova, all held at the Olimpiyskiy Arena in Moscow, Russia. It was organised by the European Broadcasting Union (EBU) and host broadcaster Channel One (C1R), which staged the event after the All-Russia State Television and Radio Broadcasting Company (RTR) won the 2008 contest for Russia with the song "Believe" by Dima Bilan.

Broadcasters from forty-two countries participated in the contest, down one from the record forty-three the year before. Slovakia returned to the contest for the first time since 1998, while San Marino did not enter due to financial issues. Latvia and Georgia originally announced their intention not to participate, but it was later stated by the EBU that both countries would participate. The Georgian Public Broadcaster (GPB) ultimately decided to withdraw after the EBU rejected its selected song as being a breach of the contest's rules. For the first time since 2003, there were no debuting countries.

The winner was Norway with the song "Fairytale", performed and written by Alexander Rybak. The song won both the jury vote and televote and received 387 points out of a possible 492, at the time the highest total score in the history of the contest. Iceland, Azerbaijan, Turkey, and the United Kingdom rounded out the top five, with the latter achieving its best placing since 2002 and Iceland equalling their best result from 1999.

After criticism of the voting system in 2007, changes in the voting procedure were finally made prior to this contest, with the re-introduction of a national jury alongside televoting for the final, while the format of the semi-finals remained the same.

== Location ==
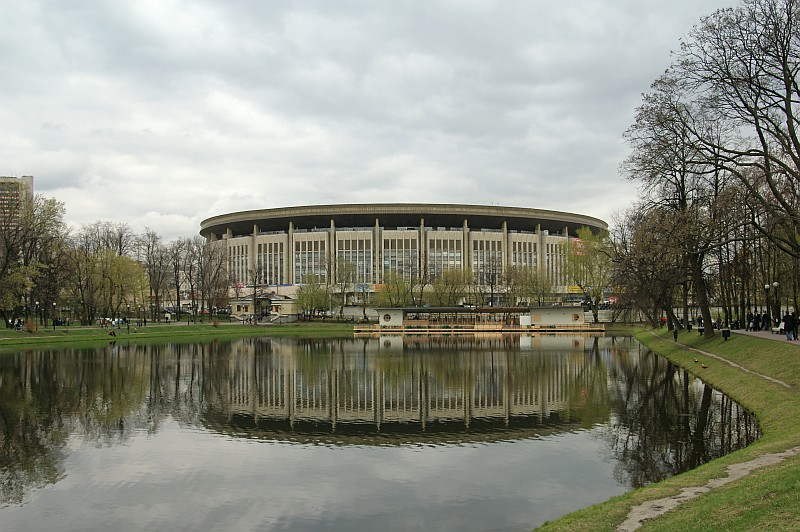
Olimpiyskiy Arena, Moscow – host venue of the 2009 contest.

The contest was held in Russia following its victory in the 2008 contest in Belgrade, Serbia, with "Believe" by Dima Bilan. Vladimir Putin, then-Prime Minister of Russia, stated that the contest would be held in Moscow.

It was proposed by Channel One that the contest be held in Moscow's Olimpiyskiy Arena, and this proposal was evaluated by the EBU and confirmed on 13 September 2008. The Director-General of the venue, Vladimir Churilin, refuted rumours of an emergency reconstruction of the building, saying: "It will not be required for the Eurovision Song Contest. We now can take up to 25 thousand spectators."

== Participants ==
Eurovision Song Contest 2009 – Participation summaries by country
- Albania; Andorra; Armenia; Azerbaijan; Belarus; Belgium; Bosnia and Herzegovina; Bulgaria; Croatia; Cyprus; Czech Republic; Denmark; Estonia; Finland; France; ~~Georgia~~; Germany; Greece; Hungary; Iceland; Ireland; Israel; Latvia; Lithuania; Macedonia; Malta; Moldova; Montenegro; Netherlands; Norway; Poland; Portugal; Romania; Russia; Serbia; Slovakia; Slovenia; Spain; Sweden; Switzerland; Turkey; Ukraine; United Kingdom

Following the release of the final participants list by the EBU, 42 countries confirmed their participation in the 2009 contest, including Slovakia, which returned to the contest after 11 years. Georgia originally announced that it was not to participate in the contest due to the Russo-Georgian War in protest of the foreign policies of Russia, but later reversed its decision after its win in the Junior Eurovision Song Contest 2008, where Russia awarded it the maximum score of 12 points. The country eventually withdrew from the contest due to its entry being deemed to contain political references, including in the title a play on words of Russia's prime minister's surname.

Rumours arose surrounding the participation and return of San Marino and Monaco. Télé Monte Carlo (TMC), the Monegasque broadcaster, confirmed that there were talks with the EBU over its return to the 2009 contest. At the same time, rumours spread that San Marino's broadcaster, Radiotelevisione della Repubblica di San Marino (SMRTV), would not participate due to poor placing at the 2008 contest. In the end, after originally confirming their intent to participate in Moscow, SMRTV was forced to withdraw from the event due to financial difficulties that prevented a second entry.

The Latvian broadcaster, Latvijas Televīzija (LTV), had reportedly withdrawn from the 2009 contest on 17 December 2008, three days after the final participation deadline. This came about due to budget cuts of over 2 million lati (2.8 million euros) from the LTV budget, hindering their ability to pay the participation fee. LTV confirmed that they had informed the EBU of their intent to withdraw based solely on financial difficulties. LTV then went into discussions with the EBU in an attempt to find a solution that would keep them in the contest. On 20 December 2008, LTV announced that it would be withdrawing, and that both the EBU and Channel One had agreed not to force a financial penalty on the late withdrawal of the broadcaster from the 2009 contest. LTV also announced its intent to be at the 2010 contest. However, on 12 January 2009, it was announced that Latvia would participate in the 2009 contest. Each participating broadcaster chose its entry for the contest through its own selection process. Some of them selected their entry through an internal selection, where they chose both the song and artist, while others held national finals where the public chose the song, the artist, or both.

Thirty-seven countries participated in one of the two semi-finals of the contest. The semi-final allocation draw took place on 30 January 2009, while the draw for the running order was held on 16 March 2009.

Several of the performing artists had previously represented the same country in past editions: Chiara had represented Malta in 1998 and 2005; Sakis Rouvas had represented Greece in 2004 and had hosted the 2006 contest; and Petr Elfimov had provided backing vocals for Belarus in 2004. In addition, Martina representing Slovenia, had provided backing vocals for Croatia in 2003, Slovenia in 2007, and Montenegro in 2008; Alexandros Panayi providing backing vocals for Greece, had represented Cyprus in 1995 and in 2000 as part of Voice, and had provided backing vocals for Cyprus in 1989 and in 1991, and for Greece in 2005; and Friðrik Ómar providing backing vocals for Iceland, had represented the country in 2008 as part of Euroband.

Eurovision Song Contest 2009 participants
Country	Broadcaster	Artist	Song	Language	Songwriter(s)
Albania	RTSH	Kejsi Tola	"Carry Me in Your Dreams"	English	Agim Doçi; Edmond Zhulali
Andorra	RTVA	Susanne Georgi	"La teva decisió (Get a Life)"	Catalan, English	Rune Braager; Lene Dissing; Pernille Georgi; Susanne Georgi; Josep Roca Vila; Marcus Winther-John
Armenia	AMPTV	Inga and Anush	"Jan Jan" (Ջան Ջան)	English, Armenian	Avet Barseghyan; Mane Hakobyan; Vardan Zadoyan
Azerbaijan	İTV	Aysel and Arash	"Always"	English	Johan Bejerholm; Marcus Englöf; Arash Labaf; Alex Papaconstantinou; Robert Uhlmann; Anderz Wrethov; Elin Wrethov
Belarus	BTRC	Petr Elfimov	"Eyes That Never Lie"	English	Petr Elfimov; Valery Prokhozhy
Belgium	RTBF	Copycat	"Copycat"	English	Jacques Duvall; Benjamin Schoos
Bosnia and Herzegovina	BHRT	Regina	"Bistra voda"	Bosnian	Aleksandar Čović
Bulgaria	BNT	Krassimir Avramov	"Illusion"	English	Krassimir Avramov; Casie Tabanau; William Tabanau
Croatia	HRT	Igor Cukrov feat. Andrea	"Lijepa Tena"	Croatian	Tonči Huljić; Vjekoslava Huljić
Cyprus	CyBC	Christina Metaxa	"Firefly"	English	Nikolas Metaxas
Czech Republic	ČT	Gipsy.cz	"Aven Romale"	English, Romani	Radoslav "Gipsy" Banga
Denmark	DR	Brinck	"Believe Again"	English	Lars Halvor Jensen; Ronan Keating; Martin Michael Larsson
Estonia	ERR	Urban Symphony	"Rändajad"	Estonian	Sven Lõhmus
Finland	YLE	Waldo's People	"Lose Control"	English	Karima; Annie Kratz-Gutå; Ari Lehtonen; Waldo
France	France Télévisions	Patricia Kaas	"Et s'il fallait le faire"	French	Fred Blondin; Anse Lazio
Germany	NDR (Note: On behalf of the German public broadcasting consortium ARD)	Alex Swings Oscar Sings!	"Miss Kiss Kiss Bang"	English	Alex Christensen; Steffen Häfelinger
Greece	ERT	Sakis Rouvas	"This Is Our Night"	English	Cameron Giles-Webb; Dimitris Kontopoulos; Craig Porteils
Hungary	MTV	Zoli Ádok	"Dance with Me"	English	Kasai; Zé Szabó
Iceland	RÚV	Yohanna	"Is It True?"	English	Tinatin Japaridze; Christopher Neil; Óskar Páll Sveinsson
Ireland	RTÉ	Sinéad Mulvey and Black Daisy	"Et Cetera"	English	Jonas Gladnikoff; Niall Mooney; Daniele Moretti; Christina Schilling
Israel	IBA	Noa and Mira Awad	"There Must Be Another Way"	English, Hebrew, Arabic	Mira Awad; Gil Dor; Noa
Latvia	LTV	Intars Busulis	"Probka" (Пробка)	Russian	Jānis Elsbergs; Kārlis Lācis; Sergejs Timofejevs
Lithuania	LRT	Sasha Son	"Love"	English, Russian	Dmitrij Šavrov
Macedonia	MRT	Next Time	"Nešto što kje ostane" (Нешто што ќе остане)	Macedonian	Jovan Jovanov; Damjan Lazarov; Elvir Mekić
Malta	PBS	Chiara	"What If We"	English	Gregory Bilsen; Marc Paelinck
Moldova	TRM	Nelly Ciobanu	"Hora din Moldova"	Romanian, English	Nelly Ciobanu; Veaceslav Daniliuc; Andrei Hadjiu
Montenegro	RTCG	Andrea Demirović	"Just Get Out of My Life"	English	Bernd Meinunger; José Juan Santana Rodríguez; Ralph Siegel
Netherlands	NOS	The Toppers	"Shine"	English	Gordon Heuckeroth
Norway	NRK	Alexander Rybak	"Fairytale"	English	Alexander Rybak
Poland	TVP	Lidia Kopania	"I Don't Wanna Leave"	English	Dee Adam; Rike Boomgaarden; Alex Geringas; Bernd Klimpel
Portugal	RTP	Flor-de-Lis	"Todas as ruas do amor"	Portuguese	Pedro Marques; Paulo Pereira
Romania	TVR	Elena	"The Balkan Girls"	English	Ovidiu Bistriceanu; Laurențiu Duță; Daris Mangal; Alexandru Pelin
Russia	C1R	Anastasia Prikhodko	"Mamo" (Мамо)	Russian, Ukrainian	Diana Golde; Konstantin Meladze
Serbia	RTS	Marko Kon and Milaan	"Cipela" (Ципела)	Serbian	Aleksandar Kobac; Marko Kon; Milan Nikolić
Slovakia	STV	Kamil Mikulčík and Nela Pocisková	"Leť tmou"	Slovak	Rastislav Dubovský; Petronela Kolevská; Ada Žigová
Slovenia	RTVSLO	Quartissimo feat. Martina	"Love Symphony"	English, Slovene	Andrej Babić; Saša Lendero
Spain	RTVE	Soraya Arnelas	"La noche es para mí"	Spanish	Jason Gill; Irini Michas; Felipe Pedroso; Dimitri Stassos
Sweden	SVT	Malena Ernman	"La Voix"	French, English	Malena Ernman; Fredrik Kempe
Switzerland	SRG SSR	Lovebugs	"The Highest Heights"	English	Lovebugs; Florian Senn; Adrian Sieber; Thomas Rechberger
Turkey	TRT	Hadise	"Düm Tek Tek"	English	Hadise Açıkgöz; Sinan Akçıl; Stefaan Fernande
Ukraine	NTU	Svetlana Loboda	"Be My Valentine! (Anti-Crisis Girl)"	English	Svetlana Loboda; Yevgeny Matyushenko
United Kingdom	BBC	Jade Ewen	"It's My Time"	English	Andrew Lloyd Webber; Diane Warren

== Format ==
Thirty-seven countries participated in one of the two semi-finals of the contest, with the "Big Four" countries (France, Germany, Spain, and the United Kingdom) and the host (Russia) pre-qualified for the final. In addition to those pre-qualified, the final also included the ten selected countries from each semi-final, making a total of twenty-five participants.

A discussion on changes to the format of the 2009 Eurovision Song Contest had taken place at an EBU meeting in Athens, Greece, in June 2008 where a proposal was made that could have resulted in the "Big Four" losing their automatic place in the final of the contest. However, it was confirmed that the "Big Four" countries would continue to automatically qualify for the final at the 2009 contest.

=== Graphic design ===
The stage design of the contest

Host broadcaster Channel One presented the sub-logo and theme for the 2009 contest on 30 January 2009. The sub-logo is based upon a "Fantasy Bird", which can be used with many colours. As in previous years, the sub-logo was presented alongside the generic logo. 2009 is the only year since the introduction of slogans in 2002 not to have one.

The stage was designed by New York-based set designer John Casey, and was based around the theme of contemporary Russian avant-garde. Casey, who had previously designed the stage for the Eurovision Song Contest 1997 in Dublin, was also involved in design teams for the 1994 and 1995 contests. He explained that "even before [he] worked with the Russians on the TEFI Awards in Moscow in 1998, [he] was inspired by and drawn to art from the Russian Avant Garde period, especially the constructivists... [He] tried to come up with a theatrical design for the contest that incorporates Russian avant-garde art into a contemporary setting, almost entirely made up of different types of LED screens." Casey explained that together, the various LED shapes form the finished product. Furthermore, large sections of the stage can move, including the circular central portion of curved LED screens, which can be moved to effect and allow each song to have a different feel.

=== Postcards ===
The music accompanying the postcards used to introduce each participating country was written and produced by British electronic musician Matthew Herbert.

The postcards opened with the words "Moskva 2009" (Москва 2009), the transliterated Russian way to say "Moscow 2009". It continued with the appearance of Miss World 2008, Ksenia Sukhinova of Russia, and then a group of famous landmarks from the participating country were shown in computer animation. The animation would simulate a pop-up book, with each "page turn" showing different landmarks. Then Sukhinova reappeared again, wearing a hat comprising all of the landmarks shown (as well as having different hairstyle & make-up each time) and a T-shirt with the colours of the respective country's flag. The Russian video had the exact appearance of Sukhinova shown in the first part of every video, and no different hairstyle was shown for the Russian entry.

Then, on the right, the 2009 contest logo appeared with the name and the flag of the country. Finally a phrase in transliterated Russian word and its English translation were shown. The words shown were as were as following, listed in alphabetical order:

- Albania – Ikra (Икра – Caviar)
- Andorra – Potselui (Поцелуй – Kiss)
- Armenia – Sibir (Сибирь – Siberia)
- Azerbaijan – Valenki (Валенки – Winter boots)
- Belarus – Karavai (Каравай – Round loaf of bread)
- Belgium – Veselo (Весело – Cheerfully)
- Bosnia and Herzegovina – Bud zdorov (Будь здоров – Bless you!)
- Bulgaria – Krasota (Красота – Beauty)
- Croatia – Matryoshka (Матрешка – Russian doll)
- Cyprus – Druzhba (Дружба – Friendship)
- Czech Republic – Privet! (Привет! – Hi!)
- Denmark – Ded Moroz (Дед Мороз – Santa Claus)
- Estonia – Gagarin (Гагарин (Note: Referring to Russian cosmonaut Yuri Gagarin))
- Finland – Na zdarovie! (На здоровье! – Cheers!)
- France – Lublu (Люблю – Love)
- Germany – Poehali! (Поехали! – Let's go!)
- Greece – Vsego dobrogo (Всего доброго – Good luck)
- Hungary – Mir (Мир – Peace/World)
- Iceland – Sneg (Снег – Snow)
- Ireland – Balalaika (Балалайка – Music instrument)
- Israel – Horosho (Хорошо – Good/OK)
- Latvia – Borsch (Борщ – Beetroot soup)
- Lithuania – Kosmos (Космос – Space)
- Macedonia – Klassno (Классно – Great/Cool)
- Malta – Skazka (Сказка – Fairytale)
- Moldova – Chudo (Чудо – Miracle)
- Montenegro – Dobro pojalovat! (Добро пожаловать! – Welcome!)
- Netherlands – Zima (Зима – Winter)
- Norway – Babushka (Бабушка – Grandmother)
- Poland – Vecherinka (Вечеринка – Party)
- Portugal – Pozhalusta (Пожалуйста – Please)
- Romania – Tantsui (Танцуй – Dance)
- Russia – Davai-davai (Давай-давай – Come on!)
- Serbia – Schastie (Счастье – Happiness)
- Slovakia – Medved (Медведь – Bear)
- Slovenia – Vmeste (Вместе – Together)
- Spain – Spasibo (Спасибо – Thank you)
- Sweden – Muzika (Музыка – Music)
- Switzerland – Vesna (Весна – Spring)
- Turkey – Kak dela (Как дела – How are you?)
- Ukraine – Shick! (Шик! – Glamour)
- United Kingdom – Zazhigai! (Зажигай! – Let's rock!)

=== Semi-final allocation draw ===
Results of the semi-final allocation draw Participating countries in the first semi-final (Note: Georgia, which had originally been allocated into semi-final 1, withdrew from the contest in March 2009.) Pre-qualified for the final but also voting in the first semi-final Participating countries in the second semi-final Pre-qualified for the final but also voting in the second semi-final

On Friday 30 January 2009, the draw to decide which countries would appear in either the first or second semi-final took place at the Marriott Royal Aurora Hotel. The participating countries excluding the automatic finalists (France, Germany, host country Russia, Spain and the United Kingdom) were split into six pots, based upon how those countries have been voting. From these pots, half (or as close to half as is possible) competed in the first semi-final on 12 May 2009. The other half in that particular pot will compete in the second semi-final on 14 May 2009. The draw for the running order of the semi-finals, finals, and the order of voting, occurred on 16 March 2009 at Cosmos Hotel.

Pot 1	Pot 2	Pot 3	Pot 4	Pot 5	Pot 6
Albania; Bosnia and Herzegovina; Croatia; Macedonia; Montenegro; Serbia; Slovenia	Denmark; Estonia; Finland; Iceland; Norway; Sweden	Armenia; Azerbaijan; Belarus; ~~Georgia~~; Israel; Moldova; Ukraine	Belgium; Bulgaria; Cyprus; Greece; Netherlands; Turkey	Andorra; Ireland; Latvia; Lithuania; Portugal; Romania	Czech Republic; Hungary; Malta; Poland; Slovakia; Switzerland

=== Voting system ===
In response to some broadcasters' continued complaints about politically charged, neighbourly and diaspora voting, the EBU evaluated the voting procedure used in the contest, with the possibility of a change in the voting system for 2009. Contest organisers sent a questionnaire regarding the voting system to participating broadcasters, and a reference group incorporated the responses into their suggestions for next year's format. Telewizja Polska (TVP), the Polish broadcaster, suggested that an international jury similar to the one used in the Eurovision Dance Contest 2008 be introduced in the Eurovision Song Contest to lessen the impact of neighbourly voting and place more emphasis on the artistic value of the song. A jury would lead to less political and diaspora voting as the jury members, mandated to be music industry experts, would also have a say in addition to "random members of the public".

It was decided that for the contest final, each country's votes would be decided by a combination of 50% televoting results and 50% national jury. The method of selecting the semi-final qualifiers remained the same for the most part, with nine countries, instead of the ten as in years past, qualifying from each semi-final based on the televoting results. For the tenth qualifier from each semi-final, the highest placed country on the back-up jury scoreboard that had not already qualified, was chosen for the final. At the final, each country combined their 1–7, 8, 10, 12 points from the televote with their 1–7, 8, 10, 12 jury points to create their "national scorecard". The country with the most points received 12 points, the second placed country received 10 points, the third placed country received 8 points and so on to 1 points. If a tie arose, the song with the higher televote position was given the advantage and the higher point value. National juries were originally phased out of the contest beginning in 1997, with televoting having become mandatory for nearly all participants since 2003.

Edgar Böhm, director of entertainment for Austria's public broadcaster Österreichischer Rundfunk (ORF), has stated that the 2008 format with two semi-finals "still incorporates a mix of countries who will be politically favoured in the voting process," and "that, unless a clear guideline as to how the semifinals are organised is made by the EBU, Austria will not be taking part in Moscow 2009." Despite the inclusion of jury voting in the final, Austria did not return to the contest in 2009.

=== Juries ===
Each of the 42 participating broadcasters assembled a jury of five music industry professionals (including one jury chairperson) that judged the entries taking part in the Final. Their decision was based on the second dress rehearsal. The names of the jury members was revealed by each broadcaster before or during the Final.

- Each jury member of each national jury made a ranking of their ten favourite songs and awarded points from 1 to 8, 10 and 12 points. The chairperson allocated 12 points to the song having obtained the highest number of votes from all jury members, 10 points to the song having obtained the second highest number of votes, 8 points to the song having obtained the third highest number of votes, 7 points to the next, and so on down to 1 point for the song having obtained the tenth highest number of votes from all jury members. In the event of a tie for any of the above positions, the order of the tying songs was ascertained by a show of hands by the jury members (abstentions were not allowed).
- The jury consisted of a variety of members in terms of age, gender, and background. All jury members were citizens of the country they were representing.
- None of the jury members must be connected with any of the participating songs/artists in such a way that they could not vote independently. The participating broadcasters sent a letter of compliance with the voting instructions together with signed declarations by each jury member stating that they would vote independently. The jury voting was monitored by an independent notary and auditor in each country.

== Contest overview ==
=== Semi-final 1 ===
The first semi final took place on 12 May 2009 at 23:00 MST (21:00 CEST). All the countries competing in this semi-final were eligible to vote, plus United Kingdom and Germany. Before its withdrawal, Georgia was originally drawn to perform in this semi-final. The highlighted countries qualified for the final.

Televoting qualifiers
‡ Back-up jury qualifier

Results of the first semi-final of the Eurovision Song Contest 2009
R/O	Country	Artist	Song	Points	Place
1	Montenegro	Andrea Demirović	"Just Get Out of My Life"	44	11
2	Czech Republic	Gipsy.cz	"Aven Romale"	0	18
3	Belgium	Copycat	"Copycat"	1	17
4	Belarus	Petr Elfimov	"Eyes That Never Lie"	25	13
5	Sweden	Malena Ernman	"La Voix"	105	4
6	Armenia	Inga and Anush	"Jan Jan"	99	5
7	Andorra	Susanne Georgi	"La teva decisió (Get a Life)"	8	15
8	Switzerland	Lovebugs	"The Highest Heights"	15	14
9	Turkey	Hadise	"Düm Tek Tek"	172	2
10	Israel	Noa and Mira Awad	"There Must Be Another Way"	75	7
11	Bulgaria	Krassimir Avramov	"Illusion"	7	16
12	Iceland	Yohanna	"Is It True?"	174	1
13	Macedonia	Next Time	"Nešto što kje ostane"	45	10
14	Romania	Elena	"The Balkan Girls"	67	9
15	Finland	Waldo's People	"Lose Control"	42	12 ‡
16	Portugal	Flor-de-Lis	"Todas as ruas do amor"	70	8
17	Malta	Chiara	"What If We"	86	6
18	Bosnia and Herzegovina	Regina	"Bistra voda"	125	3

=== Semi-final 2 ===
The second semi final took place on 14 May 2009 at 23:00 MST (21:00 CEST). All the countries competing in this semi-final were eligible to vote, plus France, Russia and Spain. However, Spain used jury vote instead of televoting, as the semi-final was aired late due to scheduling conflicts at Televisión Española (TVE), and Spanish viewers were not able to vote. The highlighted countries qualified for the final.

Televoting qualifiers
‡ Back-up jury qualifier

Results of the second semi-final of the Eurovision Song Contest 2009
R/O	Country	Artist	Song	Points	Place
1	Croatia	Igor Cukrov feat. Andrea	"Lijepa Tena"	33	13 ‡
2	Ireland	Sinéad Mulvey and Black Daisy	"Et Cetera"	52	11
3	Latvia	Intars Busulis	"Probka"	7	19
4	Serbia	Marko Kon and Milaan	"Cipela"	60	10
5	Poland	Lidia Kopania	"I Don't Wanna Leave"	43	12
6	Norway	Alexander Rybak	"Fairytale"	201	1
7	Cyprus	Christina Metaxa	"Firefly"	32	14
8	Slovakia	Kamil Mikulčík and Nela Pocisková	"Leť tmou"	8	18
9	Denmark	Brinck	"Believe Again"	69	8
10	Slovenia	Quartissimo feat. Martina	"Love Symphony"	14	16
11	Hungary	Zoli Ádok	"Dance with Me"	16	15
12	Azerbaijan	Aysel and Arash	"Always"	180	2
13	Greece	Sakis Rouvas	"This Is Our Night"	110	4
14	Lithuania	Sasha Son	"Love"	66	9
15	Moldova	Nelly Ciobanu	"Hora din Moldova"	106	5
16	Albania	Kejsi Tola	"Carry Me in Your Dreams"	73	7
17	Ukraine	Svetlana Loboda	"Be My Valentine! (Anti-Crisis Girl)"	80	6
18	Estonia	Urban Symphony	"Rändajad"	115	3
19	Netherlands	The Toppers	"Shine"	11	17

=== Final ===
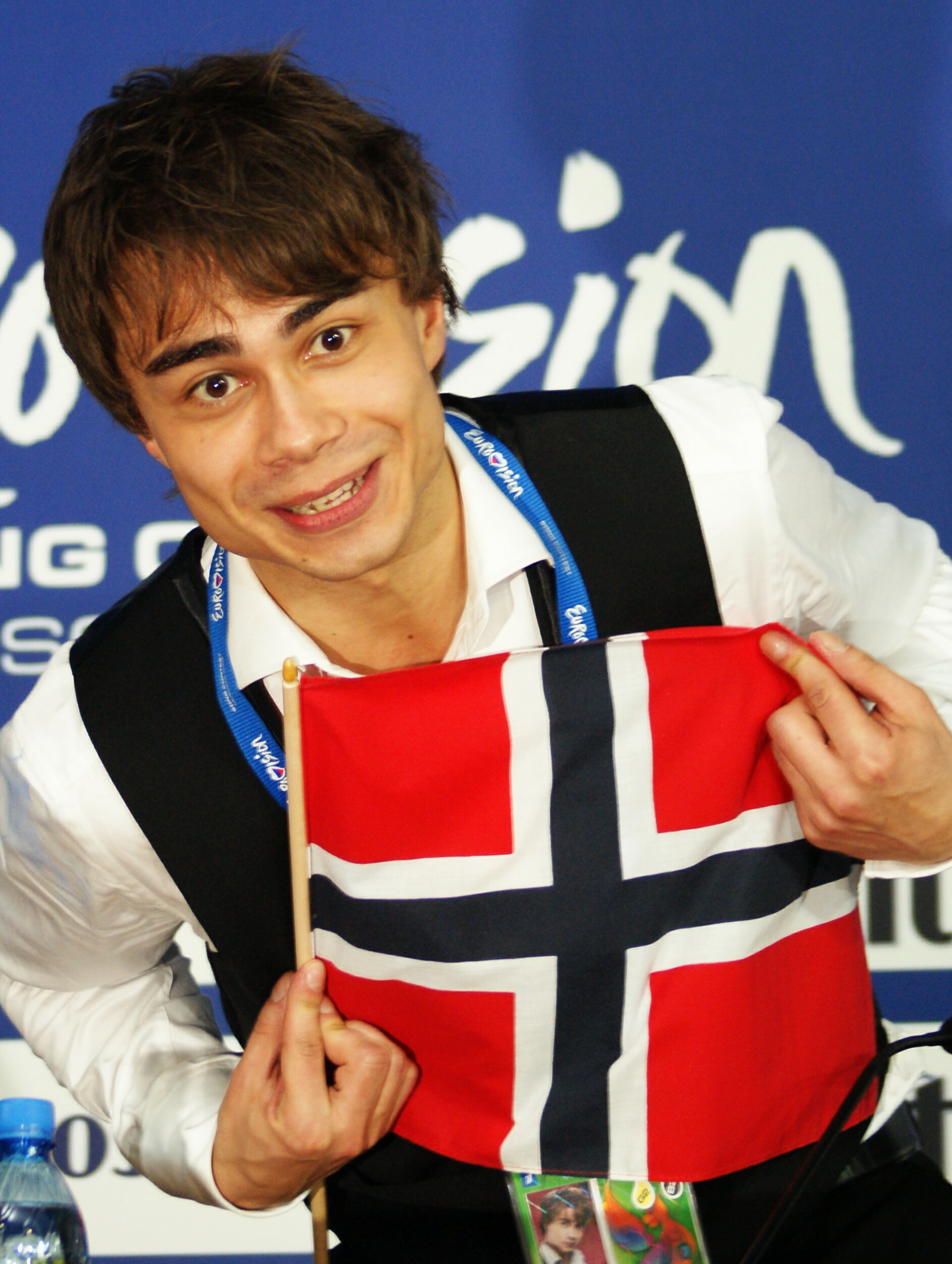
Alexander Rybak after winning.

The finalists were:

- the "Big Four" countries (France, Germany, Spain, and the United Kingdom);
- the host country (Russia);
- the top nine countries from the first semi-final plus one wildcard from the juries;
- the top nine countries from the second semi-final plus one wildcard from the juries.

The final took place in Moscow on 16 May 2009 at 23:00 MST (21:00 CEST) and was won by Norway. 25 countries participated in the final and all 42 participants voted.

Norway won with 387 points, winning both the jury vote and the televote. Iceland came second with 218 points, with Azerbaijan, Turkey, United Kingdom, Estonia, Greece, France, Bosnia and Herzegovina and Armenia completing the top ten. Sweden, Malta, Lithuania, Spain and Finland occupied the bottom five positions.

Winner

Results of the final of the Eurovision Song Contest 2009
R/O	Country	Artist	Song	Points	Place
1	Lithuania	Sasha Son	"Love"	23	23
2	Israel	Noa and Mira Awad	"There Must Be Another Way"	53	16
3	France	Patricia Kaas	"Et s'il fallait le faire"	107	8
4	Sweden	Malena Ernman	"La Voix"	33	21
5	Croatia	Igor Cukrov feat. Andrea	"Lijepa Tena"	45	18
6	Portugal	Flor-de-Lis	"Todas as ruas do amor"	57	15
7	Iceland	Yohanna	"Is It True?"	218	2
8	Greece	Sakis Rouvas	"This Is Our Night"	120	7
9	Armenia	Inga and Anush	"Jan Jan"	92	10
10	Russia	Anastasia Prikhodko	"Mamo"	91	11
11	Azerbaijan	Aysel and Arash	"Always"	207	3
12	Bosnia and Herzegovina	Regina	"Bistra voda"	106	9
13	Moldova	Nelly Ciobanu	"Hora din Moldova"	69	14
14	Malta	Chiara	"What If We"	31	22
15	Estonia	Urban Symphony	"Rändajad"	129	6
16	Denmark	Brinck	"Believe Again"	74	13
17	Germany	Alex Swings Oscar Sings!	"Miss Kiss Kiss Bang"	35	20
18	Turkey	Hadise	"Düm Tek Tek"	177	4
19	Albania	Kejsi Tola	"Carry Me in Your Dreams"	48	17
20	Norway	Alexander Rybak	"Fairytale"	387	1
21	Ukraine	Svetlana Loboda	"Be My Valentine! (Anti-Crisis Girl)"	76	12
22	Romania	Elena	"The Balkan Girls"	40	19
23	United Kingdom	Jade Ewen	"It's My Time"	173	5
24	Finland	Waldo's People	"Lose Control"	22	25
25	Spain	Soraya Arnelas	"La noche es para mí"	23	24

==== Spokespersons ====
Each participating broadcaster appointed a spokesperson who was responsible for announcing, in English or French, the votes for its respective country. The voting order and spokespersons during the final were as follows:

1. Spain – Iñaki del Moral
2. Belgium – Maureen Louys
3. Belarus – Ekaterina Litvinova
4. Malta – Pauline Agius
5. Germany – Thomas Anders
6. Czech Republic – Petra Šubrtová
7. Sweden – Sarah Dawn Finer
8. Iceland – Þóra Tómasdóttir
9. France – Yann Renoard
10. Israel – Ofer Nachshon
11. Russia – Ingeborga Dapkūnaitė
12. Latvia – Roberto Meloni
13. Montenegro – Jovana Vukčević
14. Andorra – Brigits García
15. Finland – Jari Sillanpää
16. Switzerland – Cécile Bähler
17. Bulgaria – Yoanna Dragneva
18. Lithuania – Ignas Krupavičius
19. United Kingdom – Duncan James
20. Macedonia – Frosina Josifovska
21. Slovakia – Ľubomír Bajaník
22. Greece – Alexis Kostalas
23. Bosnia and Herzegovina – Elvir Laković Laka
24. Ukraine – Marysya Horobets
25. Turkey – Meltem Ersan Yazgan
26. Albania – Leon Menkshi
27. Serbia – Jovana Janković
28. Cyprus – Sophia Paraskeva
29. Poland – Radosław Brzózka
30. Netherlands – Yolanthe Cabau van Kasbergen
31. Estonia – Laura Põldvere
32. Croatia – Mila Horvat
33. Portugal – Helena Coelho
34. Romania – Alina Sorescu
35. Ireland – Derek Mooney
36. Denmark – Felix Smith
37. Moldova – Sandu Leancă
38. Slovenia – Peter Poles
39. Armenia – Sirusho
40. Hungary – Éva Novodomszky
41. Azerbaijan – Husniyya Maharramova
42. Norway (Note: Norway was originally scheduled to announce its votes as the 17th country, but instead voted 42nd (last). The reason for this was technical difficulties in the minutes running up to the voting presentation.) – Stian Barsnes-Simonsen

== Detailed voting results ==
There were a few glitches out of the 84 total televote counts from the two semi-finals and grand final. In the second semi final, Spain's and Albania's delays in broadcasting the show meant that their results were provided by the back-up juries. In the final, SMS voting was the only method used to provide the Hungarian public voting scores as the televotes could not be counted due to a technical problem, and Norway's jury vote was used because a technical mistake by the local telephone operator rendered the televotes and SMS texts unusable. The full split jury/televoting results of the final were announced by the EBU in July 2009.

=== Semi-final 1 ===
Televoting qualifiers
‡ Back-up jury qualifier

Detailed voting results of semi-final 1
Voting procedure used: 100% televoting		Total score	Montenegro	Czech Republic	Belgium	Belarus	Sweden	Armenia	Andorra	Switzerland	Turkey	Israel	Bulgaria	Iceland	Macedonia	Romania	Finland	Portugal	Malta	Bosnia and Herzegovina	Germany	United Kingdom
Contestants	Montenegro	44				3		5	1	2	5	1			8			1	6	10	2	
Contestants	Czech Republic	0																				
Contestants	Belgium	1						1														
Contestants	Belarus	25	2	1			1	4				4	1	1	6		4		1			
Contestants	Sweden	105		6	4	7		8	7	4	4	7		10	3	4	10	8	8	4	4	7
Contestants	Armenia	99	4	12	10	10	5			1	10	10	8	2	2	8	1			1	10	5
Contestants	Andorra	8									1							4	3			
Contestants	Switzerland	15				2	2		2								5	2		2		
Contestants	Turkey	172	8	5	12	6	7	10	5	12		6	12	7	12	12	7	5	10	12	12	12
Contestants	Israel	75	5	4	3	4	6	7	8	5	3		4	6	1	3	6		4		5	1
Contestants	Bulgaria	7									2				5							
Contestants	Iceland	174	7	10	7	12	12	12	10	7	8	12	6		4	10	12	12	12	7	6	8
Contestants	Macedonia	45	10	3						6	6		10			2				8		
Contestants	Romania	67	6		2	1		2	4		7	8	5	4	7			10	2	6	1	2
Contestants	Finland ‡	42	3		1		10		3					12		1		3	5			4
Contestants	Portugal	70		2	6		3		12	10		2	2	8		7	2			3	7	6
Contestants	Malta	86	1	7	8	8	4	3	6	3		5	3	5		6	3	6		5	3	10
Contestants	Bosnia and Herzegovina	125	12	8	5	5	8	6		8	12	3	7	3	10	5	8	7	7		8	3

==== 12 points ====
Below is a summary of the maximum 12 points each country awarded to another in the 1st semi-final:

N.	Contestant	Nation(s) giving 12 points
8	Turkey	Belgium, Bosnia and Herzegovina, Bulgaria, Germany, Macedonia, Romania, Switzerland, United Kingdom
7	Iceland	Armenia, Belarus, Finland, Israel, Malta, Portugal, Sweden
2	Bosnia and Herzegovina	Montenegro, Turkey
1	Armenia	Czech Republic
1	Finland	Iceland
1	Portugal	Andorra

=== Semi-final 2 ===
Televoting qualifiers
‡ Back-up jury qualifier

Detailed voting results of semi-final 2
Voting procedure used: 100% televoting 100% jury vote		Total score	Croatia	Ireland	Latvia	Serbia	Poland	Norway	Cyprus	Slovakia	Denmark	Slovenia	Hungary	Azerbaijan	Greece	Lithuania	Moldova	Albania	Ukraine	Estonia	Netherlands	France	Russia	Spain
Contestants	Croatia ‡	33				12			2			10	1				3	1	1				3	
Contestants	Ireland	52	1		5	3	3	4			10	2				7	2	7		4	3	1		
Contestants	Latvia	7														6				1				
Contestants	Serbia	60	12					2	4			12	2		5						6	12		5
Contestants	Poland	43		10				3		3	3			1	1	3	1	6	6		2	4		
Contestants	Norway	201	8	8	10	8	10		8	10	12	8	10	12	8	12	10	8	10	12	12	3	10	12
Contestants	Cyprus	32		2	1	2				1	7				12	1				6				
Contestants	Slovakia	8		1														4	2				1	
Contestants	Denmark	69	2	7	3		1	12	3			5	3	2	2	5		5		8	7			4
Contestants	Slovenia	14	7			5												2						
Contestants	Hungary	16								2				8				3						3
Contestants	Azerbaijan	180	6	6	8	6	12	6	10	12	8	6	12		7	10	12		12	10	8	10	12	7
Contestants	Greece	110	3		4	10	2	1	12	5	2	4	6	4		4	6	12	4	5	10	6	4	6
Contestants	Lithuania	66		12	7		4	7	1		5			6			4		5	7		2	5	1
Contestants	Moldova	106	5	5	2	7	5	10	7	7		3	5	7	6				8	2	4	7	8	8
Contestants	Albania	73	10				6	5		4	6	7	4	5	10		5		3		1	5	2	
Contestants	Ukraine	80		3	6	1	7		6	6			8	10	3	2	8			3			7	10
Contestants	Estonia	115	4	4	12	4	8	8	5	8	4	1	7	3	4	8	7		7		5	8	6	2
Contestants	Netherlands	11									1							10						

==== 12 points ====
Below is a summary of the maximum 12 points each country awarded to another in the 2nd semi-final:

N.	Contestant	Nation(s) giving 12 points
6	Norway	Azerbaijan, Denmark, Estonia, Lithuania, Netherlands, Spain
6	Azerbaijan	Hungary, Moldova, Poland, Russia, Slovakia, Ukraine
3	Serbia	Croatia, France, Slovenia
2	Greece	Albania, Cyprus
1	Cyprus	Greece
1	Denmark	Norway
1	Croatia	Serbia
1	Lithuania	Ireland
1	Estonia	Latvia

=== Final ===
Winner

Split results of the final
Place	Combined		Jury		Televoting	
Place	Country	Points	Country	Points	Country	Points
1	Norway	387	Norway	312	Norway	378
2	Iceland	218	Iceland	260	Azerbaijan	253
3	Azerbaijan	207	United Kingdom	223	Turkey	203
4	Turkey	177	France	164	Iceland	173
5	United Kingdom	173	Estonia	124	Greece	151
6	Estonia	129	Denmark	120	Estonia	129
7	Greece	120	Turkey	114	Bosnia and Herzegovina	124
8	France	107	Azerbaijan	112	Russia	118
9	Bosnia and Herzegovina	106	Israel	107	Armenia	111
10	Armenia	92	Moldova	93	United Kingdom	105
11	Russia	91	Greece	93	Albania	81
12	Ukraine	76	Bosnia and Herzegovina	90	Ukraine	70
13	Denmark	74	Malta	87	Moldova	66
14	Moldova	69	Germany	73	Romania	64
15	Portugal	57	Armenia	71	Sweden	59
16	Israel	53	Ukraine	68	Croatia	55
17	Albania	48	Russia	67	France	54
18	Croatia	45	Portugal	64	Portugal	45
19	Romania	40	Croatia	58	Denmark	40
20	Germany	35	Lithuania	31	Lithuania	38
21	Sweden	33	Romania	31	Spain	38
22	Malta	31	Sweden	27	Finland	30
23	Lithuania	23 (Note: Despite finishing with the same number of points as Spain, Lithuania is deemed to have finished in 23rd place due to receiving points from a greater number of countries.)	Albania	26	Germany	18
24	Spain	23	Finland	12	Malta	18
25	Finland	22	Spain	9	Israel	15

Detailed voting results of the final
Voting procedure used: 50% jury and televote 100% jury vote		Total score	Spain	Belgium	Belarus	Malta	Germany	Czech Republic	Sweden	Iceland	France	Israel	Russia	Latvia	Montenegro	Andorra	Finland	Switzerland	Bulgaria	Lithuania	United Kingdom	Macedonia	Slovakia	Greece	Bosnia and Herzegovina	Ukraine	Turkey	Albania	Serbia	Cyprus	Poland	Netherlands	Estonia	Croatia	Portugal	Romania	Ireland	Denmark	Moldova	Slovenia	Armenia	Hungary	Azerbaijan	Norway
Contestants	Lithuania	23												7					1		4												2				7	1					1	
Contestants	Israel	53		8				4			10				4	7		1					5		8	1							5											
Contestants	France	107	3	1	7		3			6		5	10	5	1	3	4	7		6	1			6	6	3		2	3			6					3	2		7	6			1
Contestants	Sweden	33				4				3	2					2	7											1					6					4						4
Contestants	Croatia	45								1					8							4		2	12				5										2	6			5	
Contestants	Portugal	57	8	6				7		7	7					6		10					2		1								3											
Contestants	Iceland	218			2	12	7	2	10			10	3	8	5	8	10	5	5	8	8	2	6	4			2	6		5	1	7	8	2	8	10	12	10	3	5	5	7		12
Contestants	Greece	120	1	5	5	7	6		2				4		2			2	12		5				5			12	6	12		1		7		8				4	10	4		
Contestants	Armenia	92	4	7	1			12	3	5	6	8	5				1		6			1	3			2	6			4	2	5			4	7								
Contestants	Russia	91			8		5	8				7		6						7						8	4			1	3		10						6		12		6	
Contestants	Azerbaijan	207		3	10	1		10	8		1	6	7	4	6		2		8	5	3	3	4	8	3	10	12	4	4	8	6	10	7	10		4		8	10	1	1	10		10
Contestants	Bosnia and Herzegovina	106					2		5	2					12		6	4	4			10	8				8	5	12			4		12						10			2	
Contestants	Moldova	69	5	4								1	1													7	7				5			3	12	12					2		7	3
Contestants	Malta	31					4							1		1	3			1	6								7							3	5							
Contestants	Estonia	129			4		1		7	10			8	10			12			10			12	5		4				3	8			6		1	6	5	7			6	4	
Contestants	Denmark	74				6				4	5			3		5				2						5			1	6	7					2	4		5	8		3		8
Contestants	Germany	35		2							3										7				2		1	3				2			1		1	7						6
Contestants	Turkey	177	2	12		5	10	1	6		12	3			3		5	12	10		12	12		3	7			10				8		1	3	6		6			4	5	12	7
Contestants	Albania	48							1						7			6				7		7			10						1	5						2		2		
Contestants	Norway	387	12	10	12	8	12	3	12	12	8	12	12	12	10	10	8	8	2	12	10	8	10	10	10	12	3	7	10	10	12	12	12	8	5	5	8	12	8	12	8	12	8	
Contestants	Ukraine	76	6		6	2		5				2	2							4	2		1								10				6				4		3	8	10	5
Contestants	Romania	40	7																			5					5		2	2					2		2		12				3	
Contestants	United Kingdom	173	10		3	10	8	6			4	4	6	2		4			7	3		6	7	12	4	6		8	8	7	4	3		4	10		10	3	1	3	7	1		2
Contestants	Finland	22				3			4	8									3														4											
Contestants	Spain	23														12		3						1											7									

==== 12 points ====
Below is a summary of all 12 points in the final:

N.	Contestant	Nation(s) giving 12 points
16	Norway	Belarus, Denmark, Estonia, Germany, Hungary, Iceland, Israel, Latvia, Lithuania, Netherlands, Poland, Russia, Slovenia, Spain, Sweden, Ukraine
6	Turkey	Azerbaijan, Belgium, France, Macedonia, Switzerland, United Kingdom
3	Bosnia and Herzegovina	Croatia, Montenegro, Serbia
3	Greece	Albania, Bulgaria, Cyprus
3	Iceland	Ireland, Malta, Norway
2	Estonia	Finland, Slovakia
2	Moldova	Portugal, Romania
1	Armenia	Czech Republic
1	Azerbaijan	Turkey
1	Croatia	Bosnia and Herzegovina
1	Romania	Moldova
1	Russia	Armenia
1	Spain	Andorra
1	United Kingdom	Greece

== Broadcasts ==
Most countries sent commentators to Moscow or commentated from their own country, in order to add insight to the participants and, if necessary, provide voting information.

Broadcasters and commentators in participating countries
Country	Broadcaster	Channel(s)	Show(s)	Commentator(s)	Ref(s)
Andorra	RTVA	ATV		Meri Picart	
Azerbaijan	İTV		SF1	Aysel Teymurzadeh	
Belarus	BTRC	Belarus-1	All shows	Denis Kurian and Alexander Tikhanovich	
Belgium	RTBF	La Une, RTBF Sat	All shows (Note: Deferred broadcast of semi-final 2 on La Une at 22:30 (CEST))	Jean-Pierre Hautier and Jean-Louis Lahaye	
Belgium	VRT	Eén	All shows	Anja Daems and André Vermeulen	
Bosnia and Herzegovina	BHRT	BHT 1, BH Radio 1	All shows	Dejan Kukrić	
Croatia	HRT	HRT 2	Semi-finals	Duško Ćurlić	
Croatia	HRT	HRT 1	Final	Duško Ćurlić	
Cyprus	CyBC	RIK 1	All shows		
Cyprus	CyBC	RIK Deftero	SF2/Final	Nathan Morley	
Czech Republic	ČT	ČT1	SF1/Final	Jan Rejžek	
Czech Republic	ČT	ČT2	SF2 (Note: Deferred broadcast of semi-final 2 on 15 May at 00:10 (CEST))	Jan Rejžek	
Denmark	DR	DR1	All shows	Nicolai Molbech	
Estonia	ERR	ETV	All shows	Marko Reikop	
Estonia	ERR	ETV	Final	Olav Osolin	
Finland	YLE	YLE TV2	All shows	Finnish: Jaana Pelkonen, Mikko Peltola and Asko Murtomäki; Swedish: Thomas Larsson	
Finland	YLE	YLE Radio Suomi	All shows	Sanna Kojo and Jorma Hietamäki	
France	France Télévisions	France 4	SF2	Peggy Olmi and Yann Renoard	
France	France Télévisions	France 3	Final	Julien Courbet and Cyril Hanouna	
Germany	ARD	Phoenix	SF1	Tim Frühling	
Germany	ARD	NDR Fernsehen	SF2	Tim Frühling	
Germany	ARD	Das Erste	Final	Tim Frühling	
Greece	ERT			Betty and Mathildi Maggira	
Greece	ERT			Maria Kozakou	
Hungary	MTV	m1	All shows	Gábor Gundel Takács	
Iceland	RÚV	Sjónvarpið, Rás 2	All shows	Sigmar Guðmundsson	
Ireland	RTÉ	RTÉ Two	Semi-finals	Marty Whelan	
Ireland	RTÉ	RTÉ One	Final	Marty Whelan	
Ireland	RTÉ	RTÉ Radio 1	SF2/Final	Maxi	
Latvia	LTV			Kārlis Streips	
Lithuania	LRT			Darius Užkuraitis	
Macedonia	MRT		All shows	Karolina Petkovska and Aleksandra Jovanovska	
Malta	PBS	TVM		Valerie Vella	
Montenegro	RTCG	TVCG 1	SF1/Final	Dražen Bauković and Tamara Ivanković	
Montenegro	RTCG	TVCG 2	SF2	Dražen Bauković and Tamara Ivanković	
Montenegro	RTCG	RTCG Sat	All shows	Dražen Bauković and Tamara Ivanković	
Netherlands	NOS	Nederland 1	All shows	Cornald Maas	
Norway	NRK	NRK1	All shows	Synnøve Svabø	
Poland	TVP	TVP1	SF2/Final (Note: Semi-final 2 and final aired live; summary of semi-final 1 aired on delay on 13 May at 15:15 (CEST))	Artur Orzech	
Portugal	RTP	RTP1, RTP Internacional	All shows (Note: Deferred broadcast of semi-final 2 at 23:00 (WEST))	Hélder Reis	
Romania	TVR	TVR 1	All shows		
Russia	Channel One		All shows	Yana Churikova	
Russia	Channel One		Semi-finals	Alexey Manuylov	
Russia	Channel One		Final	Philipp Kirkorov	
Serbia	RTS	RTS1, RTS Digital, RTS Sat	All shows		
Slovakia	STV	Jednotka	All shows	Roman Bomboš	
Slovenia	RTVSLO	TV SLO 1	All shows	Andrej Hofer	
Spain	RTVE	La 2	Semi-finals (Note: Live broadcast of semi-final 1 on RTVE.es with deferred broadcast on La 2 the same day; unplanned delayed broadcast of semi-final 2 by sixty-five minutes due to overrun of Madrid Open tennis tournament.)	Joaquín Guzmán	
Spain	RTVE	La 1, TVE Internacional	Final	Joaquín Guzmán	
Sweden	SVT	SVT1	All shows	Shirley Clamp and Edward af Sillén	
Sweden	SVT	SVT1	SF1	Arash	
Sweden	SR			Carolina Norén and Björn Kjellman	
Switzerland	SRG SSR	SF zwei	SF1/Final	Sven Epiney	
Switzerland	SRG SSR	TSR 2	SF1/Final	Jean-Marc Richard	
Switzerland	SRG SSR	TSR 2	Final	Nicolas Tanner	
Switzerland	SRG SSR	RSI La 2	SF1	Sandy Altermatt	
Switzerland	SRG SSR	RSI La 1	Final	Sandy Altermatt	
Turkey	TRT	TRT 1	All shows		
Ukraine	NTU	Pershyi Natsionalnyi	All shows		
United Kingdom	BBC	BBC Three	Semi-finals	Paddy O'Connell and Sarah Cawood	
United Kingdom	BBC	BBC One	Final	Graham Norton	
United Kingdom	BBC	BBC Radio 2	Final	Ken Bruce	

Broadcasters and commentators in non-participating countries
Country	Broadcaster	Channel(s)	Show(s)	Commentator(s)	Ref(s)
Australia	SBS	SBS	All shows (Note: Deferred broadcast of semi-finals on 15 and 16 May and the final on 17 May at 19:30 (AEST))	Julia Zemiro and Sam Pang	
Austria	ORF	ORF 1	All shows (Note: Deferred broadcast of semi-final 1 on 13 May at 00:40 (CEST, 12 May), of semi-final 2 on 15 May at 00:20 (CEST), and live coverage of the final from 23:00 (CEST) covering the voting segment, with deferred broadcast of the performances from 00:20 (CEST))	Benny Hörtnagl	
New Zealand	Triangle Television	Triangle Stratos	Final (Note: Deferred broadcast of the final on 17 May at 19:30 (NZST))		

=== International broadcasts ===
- Australia – Although Australia was not eligible to enter, the contest was broadcast on Special Broadcasting Service (SBS) as in previous years. The first semi-final was broadcast on Friday 15 May 2009, the second semi-final on Saturday 16 May 2009, and the final on Sunday 17 May 2009, with all shows broadcast at 19:30 local time. This year, instead of airing the BBC's commentary, the broadcaster sent its own commentators, Julia Zemiro and Sam Pang. They also anchored a number of behind the scenes and interview pieces, which were inserted during assigned the various broadcasts. In recent years the contest has been one of SBS's highest-rating programmes in terms of viewer numbers. The contest rated well for SBS with 482,000 viewers tuning in for the final, with 414,000 for the second semi-final and 276,000 for the first semi-final.

SBS also broadcast the Junior Eurovision Song Contest 2008 and the Eurovision Dance Contest 2008 in the lead-up to the Eurovision Song Contest 2009. The Dance Contest was broadcast on SBS on Wednesday 6 May 2009 at 13:00 local time, while the Junior Eurovision was broadcast on Wednesday 13 May at 13:00 local time. SBS also broadcast the EBU produced Eurovision Countdown shows on 13, 14 and 15 May 2009 at 17:30 local time before the semi-finals and final.

- Austria – Österreichischer Rundfunk (ORF) confirmed that, despite having no Austrian entry in the competition, they would broadcast the contest on television. Both semi-finals were broadcast on ORF on a time delay, beginning past midnight CET. A song presentation show was broadcast on the night of the final, before broadcasting live the voting in the final. The entire Eurovision final was broadcast later that night. In all three shows the commentator was Hitradio Ö3 radio presenter Benny Hörtnagl.
- New Zealand – Although New Zealand was not eligible to enter, the final of the contest was broadcast on Triangle TV's satellite channel STRATOS on 17 May 2009. They also did a compilation of the two 2008 semi-finals on 3 May 2009 and the Eurovision Song Contest 2008 final on 10 May 2009. This was the first time in 30 years that the contest has been broadcast in New Zealand. The 2009 final was broadcast in local prime time, about 10 hours after the show has finished in Moscow.

Additionally, the official Eurovision Song Contest website also provided a live stream without commentary via the peer-to-peer medium Octoshape.

== Incidents and controversies ==
The 2009 contest experienced several controversies and incidents during its lead-up, including the interpretation of over Georgia's entry as an attack against the Russian prime minister, conflicts between Armenia and Azerbaijan stemming from the inclusion of a monument in a disputed region to represent Armenia in a video introduction, Spain's broadcaster showing a semi-final on tape delay after a scheduling conflict, and protests over Russia's treatment of LGBT people to coincide with the contest.

=== Armenia and Azerbaijan ===
There were several conflicts between Armenia and Azerbaijan during the 2009 contest.

After the first semi-final, Azerbaijani broadcaster İctimai Television (İTV) complained to the EBU over the introductory "postcard" preceding the Armenian entry, since the video clip had included a depiction of We Are Our Mountains, a monumental statue located in the unrecognized Nagorno-Karabakh republic, which is considered to be a de jure part of Azerbaijan. As a result of the complaint, the statue was edited out during the finals. However, Armenian broadcaster Public Television Company of Armenia (AMPTV) retaliated during the results presentations by having the monument displayed on a video screen in the background, and having its spokesperson Sirusho read the Armenian results from a clipboard decorated with a photo of the monument.

There were also allegations that no number had been shown for the public to call and vote for the Armenian entry during the İTV telecast in Azerbaijan. Representatives of the broadcaster denied these allegations by showing a video that showed an untampered signal during the Armenian performance. However, a subsequent EBU investigation found that İTV had blurred out the number for the Armenian entry and distorted the television signal when the Armenian performers were on stage. The EBU fined İTV an undisclosed sum and is said to have threatened to exclude the broadcaster from the competition for up to three years if further infractions of the rules are made.

In August 2009, a number of Azerbaijanis who had voted for the Armenian entry during the 2009 contest were summoned for questioning at the Ministry of National Security in Baku, during which they were accused of being "unpatriotic" and "a potential security threat". This incident initiated an EBU investigation that resulted in a change to the Eurovision rules to allow a participating broadcaster to be liable "for any disclosure of information which could be used to identify voters". Despite the conflict, Armenia gave Azerbaijan 1 point in the final, the second and final time the two countries have exchanged points as of 2025 (Armenia previously gave 2 points to Azerbaijan in the semi-final of the 2008 contest).

=== Broadcast delays in Spain ===
Due to its commitments to broadcast the Madrid Open tennis tournament, Spanish broadcaster Radiotelevisión Española (RTVE) broadcast the second semifinal on a tape delay on La 2, approximately 66 minutes after the show began in Moscow. As a result of the tape delay, the broadcaster also utilized a backup jury rather than televoting to decide its votes. RTVE had already switched to the jury in the second semi-final due to another scheduling conflict, which had already sparked criticism from the neighboring Andorran and Portuguese broadcasters, who stated that a Spanish vote would have positively influenced their performance in the first semifinal.

On the day following the semi-final, local newspaper El Mundo speculated that the broadcaster may have administered the delay on purpose in order to prevent from winning the contest, claiming that it would not be ready to host the contest if it were to win. A statement in ABC had cited technical difficulties for the delay.

After the semi-finals, the EBU announced that RTVE would face sanctions for their actions in the contest, but also stated that their participation in the 2009 contest in Moscow would not be affected. The Spanish entry, "La noche es para mí", did not fare well in the contest itself, placing 24th during the finals.

=== Georgian entry disqualification and withdrawal ===
After being placed to compete in the first semi-final on 12 May, a national final was held in Georgia to select its entry. The selected entry, "We Don't Wanna Put In" by Stephane & 3G, gained coverage and controversy due to perceived political connotations within its lyrics relating to Russian Prime Minister Vladimir Putin. The EBU rejected the song due to these political connotations, calling it a clear breach of the contest's rules. The EBU then asked the Georgian broadcaster Georgian Public Broadcaster (GPB) on 10 March to change either the lyrics of the song, or to select a new song to compete for the country. GPB refused to change the lyrics or the song, claiming that the song contained no political references, and that the rejection by the EBU was due to political pressure from Russia. As such, GPB withdrew from the contest on 11 March. The band admitted the political content of the song and their intention was just to embarrass Putin in Moscow.

=== LGBT protests ===
Russian gay rights activist Nikolai Alekseev used the contest's presence in Russia as a platform for promoting the country's position on the rights of LGBT people, countering Moscow mayor Yury Luzhkov's view that homosexuality is satanic. Alekseev announced that the 2009 edition of Moscow Pride, the city's annual gay pride parade, would coincide with the finals on 16 May, the day before the International Day Against Homophobia. The parade was also renamed "Slavic Pride", to promote gay rights and culture across the entire Slavic region of Europe. The parade was denied authorisation by Moscow officials on the basis that it would "destroy morals in society" and statements were issued stating that protesters would be treated "toughly", and that "tough measures" would be faced by anyone joining the march.

The rally was broken up by Moscow police, and 20 protesters were arrested including Nikolai Alekseev and human rights campaigner Peter Tatchell, who exclaimed that "this shows the Russian people are not free" as he was taken away by police. Sweden's representative Malena Ernman supported the cause saying that she is not homosexual herself but would be proud to call herself gay to support her fans, stating that she was sad that the Moscow government would not allow a "tribute to love" to occur. The winner of the contest, Norway's Alexander Rybak, also referred to the controversy in an interview when he called the Eurovision Song Contest itself the "biggest gay parade".

The Dutch group De Toppers made news by member Gordon threatening to boycott the final if the gay parade was violently beaten down. However, the group's failure to qualify for the final left this threat redundant.

== Other awards ==
In addition to the main winner's trophy, the Marcel Bezençon Awards and the Barbara Dex Award were contested during the 2009 Eurovision Song Contest. The OGAE, "General Organisation of Eurovision Fans" voting poll also took place before the contest.

=== Marcel Bezençon Awards ===
The Marcel Bezençon Awards, organised since 2002 by Sweden's then-Head of Delegation and 1992 representative Christer Björkman, and 1984 winner Richard Herrey, honours songs in the contest's final. The awards are divided into three categories: the Artistic Award, the Composers Award, and the Press Award.

Category	Country	Song	Artist	Songwriter(s)
Artistic Award	France	"Et s'il fallait le faire"	Patricia Kaas	Anse Lazio; Fred Blondin
Composers Award	Bosnia and Herzegovina	"Bistra voda"	Regina	Aleksandar Čović
Press Award	Norway	"Fairytale"	Alexander Rybak	Alexander Rybak

=== OGAE ===
OGAE, an organisation of over forty Eurovision Song Contest fan clubs across Europe and beyond, conducts an annual voting poll first held in 2002 as the Marcel Bezençon Fan Award. After all votes were cast, the top-ranked entry in the 2009 poll was also the winner of the contest, Norway's "Fairytale" performed by Alexander Rybak; the top five results are shown below.

Country	Song	Artist	Points
Norway	"Fairytale"	Alexander Rybak	323
France	"Et s'il fallait le faire"	Patricia Kaas	184
Sweden	"La Voix"	Malena Ernman	172
Bosnia and Herzegovina	"Bistra voda"	Regina	152
Spain	"La noche es para mí"	Soraya Arnelas	132

=== Barbara Dex Award ===
The Barbara Dex Award is a humorous fan award given to the worst dressed artist each year. Named after Belgium's representative who came last in the 1993 contest, wearing her self-designed dress, the award was handed by the fansite House of Eurovision from 1997 to 2016 and is being carried out by the fansite songfestival.be since 2017.

Country	Artist
Hungary	Zoli Ádok

== Official album ==
Cover art of the official album

Eurovision Song Contest: Moscow 2009 was the official compilation album of the 2009 contest, put together by the European Broadcasting Union and released by EMI Records and CMC International on 11 May 2009. The album featured all 42 songs that entered in the 2009 contest, including the semi-finalists that failed to qualify into the grand final.

=== Charts ===
Chart (2009)	Peak position
German Compilation Albums (Offizielle Top 100)	3
Icelandic Albums (Tónlistinn)	1
