= List of Let's Dance (Slovak TV series) contestants =

The following is a list of all Let's Dance (Slovak TV series) contestants to date along with their age at the time of competing, professional partners, competition finish, number of dances, highest and lowest scores, total scores and average scores.

== List of contestants ==
Key:

Winner of the series
Runner-up of the series
Third place of the series
Last place of the series
Withdrew in the series
Participating in the current series

== First series ==
Celebrity	Known for	Age	Professional	Place	Dances	Score		Rating	
Celebrity	Known for	Age	Professional	Place	Dances	Highest	Lowest	Aggregate	Average
Fero Mikloško	Fashion designer	30	Kristína Kamenická	10th/10	2				
Jan Novotný	Businessman	27	Marcela Spišiaková	9th/10	3				
Jozef Golonka	Ice hockey player	68	Lujza Tarajová	8th/10	4				
Kateřina Brožová	Actress	38	Matej Chren	7th/10	5				
Helena Vondráčková	Singer	59	Milan Plačko	6th/10	6				
Maroš Kramár	Actor	47	Denisa Halická	5th/10	8				
Marianna Ďurianová	Newsreader	29	Erik Ňarjaš	4th/10	10				
Tomáš Bezdeda	Singer	21	Mirka Kosorínová	3rd/10	12				
Juraj Bača	Sprint canoer	29	Barbora Jančinová	2nd/10	15				
Zuzana Fialová	Actress	32	Peter Modrovský	1st/10	15				
