= Tomáš Bezdeda =

Slovak singer

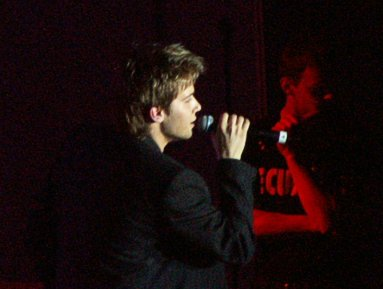

Background information
- Born: 2 December 1985 (age 40); Žilina, Czechoslovakia
- Origin: Slovakia
- Occupation: Singer
- Years active: 2004—present
- Labels: Sony BMG
- Spouse: Ivana Bezdedová

Tomáš Bezdeda (born 2 December 1985) is a Slovak singer.

== Career ==
Bezdeda's popularity rose to fame after placing third in Slovensko Hľadá SuperStar, the Slovak version of Pop Idol, on Radio and Television of Slovakia. Bezdeda worked as a moderator of the music program XXL on the same television channel. In 2006, he took part in Let's Dance on TV Markíza.

In 2009, Bezdeda attempted to represent Slovakia at the Eurovision Song Contest and to be the first Slovak entry in the contest since 1998. Bezdeda performed at the Eurosong contest, and in the final came second in the televoting with the song "Každý z nás", beaten by Kamil Mikulčík and Nela Pocisková.

In 2010, he once again attempted to represent Slovakia, performing the contest "Na strechách domov" at Eurosong contest, reaching third place.

== Discography ==
Albums

- Slovensko hľadá Superstar Top 11 (April 2005)
- Obyčajné slová (August 2005)
- Ostrov (November 2006)
- Bronzový(2013)

Singles

- Únos

== Slovensko hľadá SuperStar Performances ==
Semifinals: "Malý princ" by Aya
Top 11: "Dnes" by Tublatanka
Top 10: "Tears in Heaven" by Eric Clapton
Top 9: "When You're in Love with a Beautiful Woman" by Dr Hook
Top 8: "Hľadám" by No Name
Top 7: "Reklama na ticho" by Team
Top 6: "Stumblin' In" by Chris Norman & Suzi Quatro
Top 6: "Ó Maňo" by Vidiek and Věra Bílá
Top 6: "V slepých uličkách" by Miro Žbirka & Marika Gombitová
Top 5: "She Loves You" by The Beatles
Top 5: "Always on My Mind" by Elvis Presley
Top 4: "Poďme sa zachrániť" by Peter Nagy
Top 4: "Voda, čo ma drží nad Vodou" by Elán
Top 3: "They Can't Take That Away from Me" by Fred Astaire
Top 3: "Theme from New York, New York" by Frank Sinatra
Top 3: "Blue Moon" by Billy Vaughn

== See also ==
- The 100 Greatest Slovak Albums of All Time
