= Poland in the Eurovision Song Contest 2009 =

- Eurovision Song Contest 2009
- Participating broadcaster: Telewizja Polska (TVP)
- Country: Poland
- Selection process: Piosenka dla Europy 2009
- Selection date: 14 February 2009

Competing entry
- Song: "I Don't Wanna Leave"
- Artist: Lidia Kopania
- Songwriters: Alex Geringas; Bernd Klimpel; Rike Boomgaarden; Dee Adam

Placement
- Semi-final result: Failed to qualify (12th)

Participation chronology

Poland was represented at the Eurovision Song Contest 2009 with the song "I Don't Wanna Leave", written by Alex Geringas, Bernd Klimpel, Rike Boomgaarden and Dee Adam, and performed by Lidia Kopania. The Polish participating broadcaster, Telewizja Polska (TVP), organised the national final Piosenka dla Europy 2009 in order to select the entry for the contest. The national final took place on 14 February 2009 and featured ten entries. "I Don't Wanna Leave" performed by Lidia Kopania was selected as the winner after gaining the most points following the combination of votes from a four-member jury panel and a public vote.

Poland was drawn to compete in the second semi-final of the Eurovision Song Contest which took place on 14 May 2009. Performing in position 5, "I Don't Wanna Leave" was not announced among the ten qualifying entries of the second semi-final and therefore did not qualify to compete in the final. It was later revealed that Poland placed twelfth out of the 19 participating countries in the semi-final with 43 points.

== Background ==
Prior to the 2009 contest, Telewizja Polska (TVP) had participated in the Eurovision Song Contest representing Poland thirteen times since its first entry in 1994. Its highest placement in the contest, to this point, has been second place, achieved with its debut entry in 1994 with the song "To nie ja!" performed by Edyta Górniak. It has only, thus far, reached the top ten on one other occasion, when "Keine Grenzen – Żadnych granic" performed by Ich Troje finished seventh in 2003. Between 2005 and 2007, it failed to qualify from the semi-final round until 2008, when "For Life" performed by Isis Gee, qualified for the final and placed twenty-fourth (second last).

As part of its duties as participating broadcaster, TVP organises the selection of its entry in the Eurovision Song Contest and broadcasts the event in the country. The broadcaster announced that rather to the then-ongoing war in South Ossetia, the decision on its participation in the 2009 contest would be based on changes, if any, to the current voting system after a proposal was made to the European Broadcasting Union (EBU) to put into use an international jury in the next contest to lessen the impact of neighbourly voting and place more emphasis on the artistic value of the song. TVP confirmed its participation in the 2009 contest on 7 November 2008 after the EBU confirmed that each country's votes in the 2009 contest would be decided by a televoting and jury combination. Since 2006, TVP organised televised national finals that featured a competition among several artists and songs in order to select its entry for the Eurovision Song Contest, a selection procedure that continued for its 2009 entry.

== Before Eurovision ==
=== Piosenka dla Europy 2009 ===
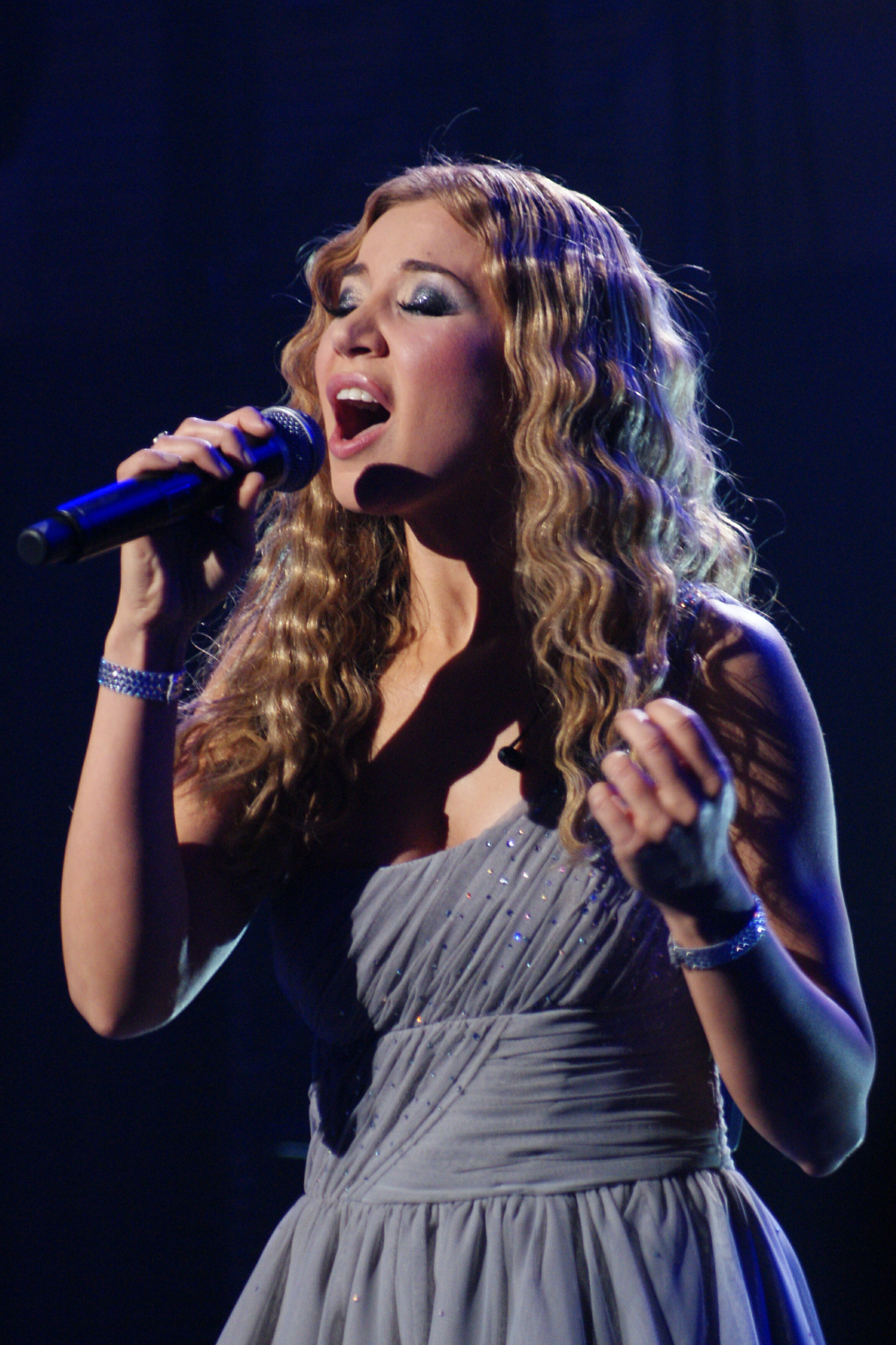
Lidia Kopania performing at Piosenka dla Europy 2009

Piosenka dla Europy 2009 was the national final organised by TVP in order to select its entry for the Eurovision Song Contest 2009. The show took place on 14 February 2009 at the TVP Headquarters in Warsaw, hosted by Radosław Brzózka and Paulina Chylewska. A combination of public televoting and jury voting selected the winner. The show was broadcast on TVP1, TVP HD and TVP Polonia as well as streamed online at the broadcaster's website tvp.pl. The national final was watched by 3.8 million viewers in Poland with a market share of 28%.

==== Competing entries ====
TVP opened a submission period for interested artists and songwriters to submit their entries between 28 November 2008 and 16 January 2009. Only artists that had either released an album or single with national radio airplays, had competed in at least one professional song contest or music festival at a national level, or had a valid contract with a record company or a professional concert agency were eligible to compete. The broadcaster received 122 submissions at the closing of the deadline. An eight-member selection committee selected twelve entries from the received submissions to compete in the national final. The selection committee consisted of Zuzanna Łapicka (Head of Entertainment of TVP1), Paweł Sztompke (journalist, music critic and editorial director of music at Polish Radio), Piotr Baron (music journalist and presenter at Polish Radio), Tomasz Miara (presenter at Radio ZET), Dariusz Maciborek (music journalist at Radio RMF FM), Tomasz Deszczyński (President of OGAE Poland), Malgorzata Kosturkiewicz (concert director, screenwriter and producer) and Piotr Klatt (musician, songwriter, journalist and music producer at TVP and artistic director of the Opole Festival). The selected entries were announced on 23 January 2009.

On 23 and 28 January 2009, "Amazing", written by Jud Friedman and Allan Rich and to have been performed by Katarzyna Skrzynecka, and "Kardamon i pieprz", written by Natalia Grosiak and to have been performed by Mikromusic, were respectively disqualified from the national final as both songs have been performed in October 2007 during Taniec z Gwiazdami, the Polish version of Dancing with the Stars. The competing artists were required to submit a promotional video for their song to TVP by 9 February 2009.

Artist	Song	Songwriter(s)
Artur Chamski	"Kilka słów"	Paweł Rurak Sokal, Andrzej Ignatowski
Dali	"Everyday"	Viktar Rudenka, Aliaksandar Liutych, Igor Znyk
Det Betales	"Jacqueline"	Leif Melander, Peter Nord, Knut Oyvind Hagen
Ira	"Dobry czas"	Artur Gadowski, Wojciech Byrski
Lidia Kopania	"I Don't Wanna Leave"	Alex Geringas, Bernd Klimpel
Man Meadow	"Love Is Gonna Get You"	Thomas G:son, Andreas Rickstrand
Marco Bocchino and Aleksandra Szwed	"All My Life"	Marco Bocchino
Renton	"I'm Not Sure"	Marek Karwowski, Paweł Szupiluk, Mariusz Gajewski, Łukasz Różycki
Stachursky	"I nie mów nic"	Daniel Maczura, Jacek Laszczok
Tigrita Project	"Mon chocolat"	Klaudia Baszniak Kozłowska

==== Final ====
The televised final took place on 14 February 2009. Ten entries competed and the winner, "I Don't Wanna Leave" performed by Lidia Kopania, was determined by a 50/50 combination of votes from a four-member professional jury and a public vote. The jury consisted of Robert Chojnacki (composer), Krzysztof Kasowski (singer), Roman Rogowiecki (deputy entertainment director of TVP1) and Marta Turska (member of OGAE Poland). In addition to the performances of the competing entries, 1994 Polish Eurovision entrant Edyta Górniak and 1999 Polish Eurovision entrant Mietek Szcześniak performed as the interval acts.

Final – 14 February 2009
R/O	Artist	Song	Jury	Televote	Total	Place
1	Stachursky	"I nie mów nic"	1	5	6	9
2	Det Betales	"Jacqueline"	3	1	4	10
3	Man Meadow	"Love Is Gonna Get You"	2	7	9	6
4	Dali	"Everyday"	6	2	8	7
5	Ira	"Dobry czas"	7	4	11	5
6	Artur Chamski	"Kilka słów"	5	8	13	4
7	Marco Bocchino and Aleksandra Szwed	"All My Life"	8	10	18	2
8	Tigrita Project	"Mon chocolat"	4	3	7	8
9	Renton	"I'm Not Sure"	12	6	18	2
10	Lidia Kopania	"I Don't Wanna Leave"	10	12	22	1

=== Promotion ===
Lidia Kopania made several appearances across Europe to specifically promote "I Don't Wanna Leave" as the Polish Eurovision entry. On 28 February, Kopania performed during the Latvian national final, as well as during the Ukrainian national final on 8 March. On 17 April, Kopania performed during the UK Eurovision Preview Party, which was held in London, United Kingdom, and on 18 April during the Eurovision Promo Concert, which was held in Amsterdam, Netherlands.

== At Eurovision ==
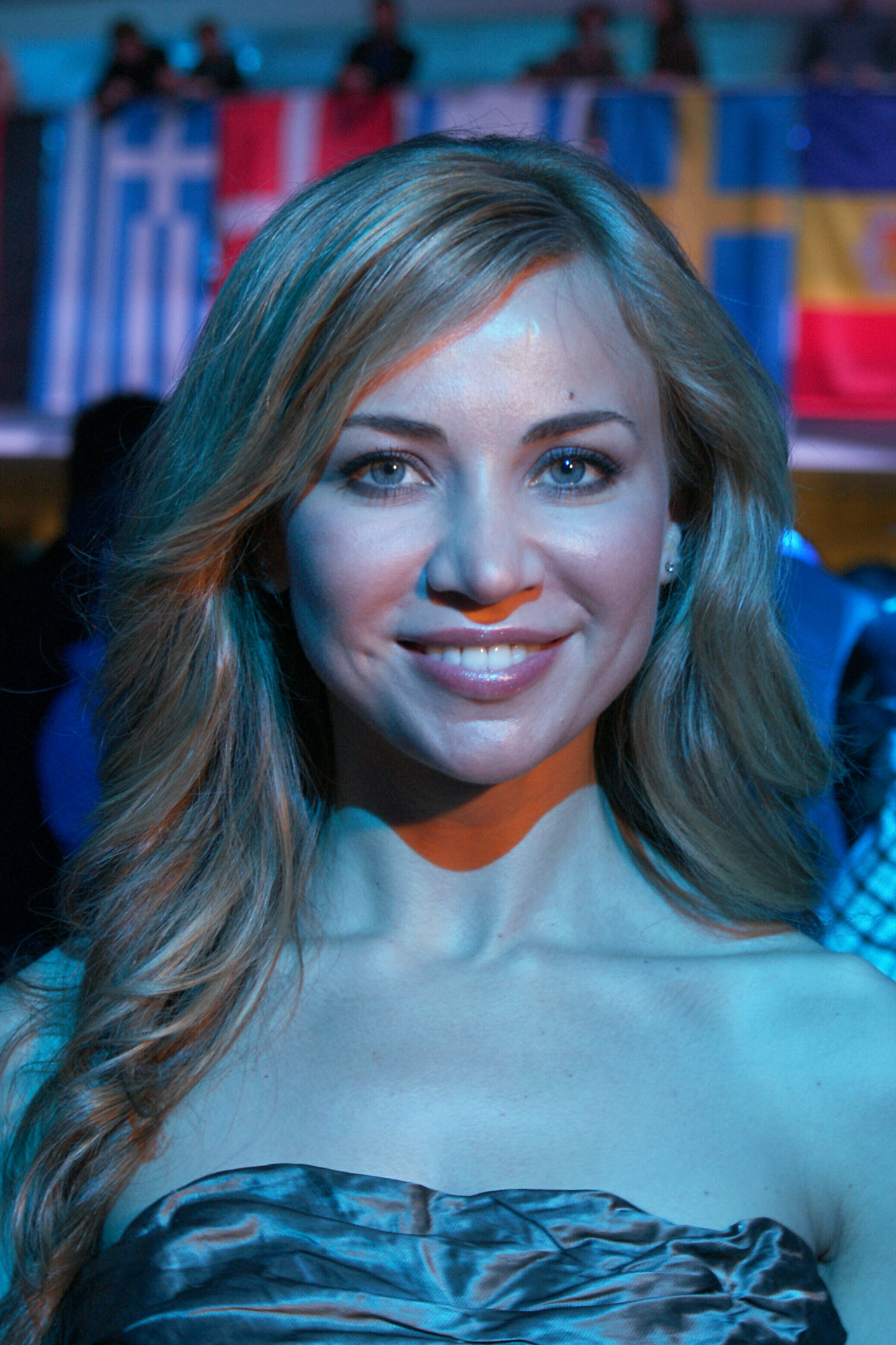
Lidia Kopania at the Eurovision Song Contest 2009

According to Eurovision rules, all nations with the exceptions of the host country and the "Big Four" (France, Germany, Spain and the United Kingdom) are required to qualify from one of two semi-finals in order to compete for the final; the top nine songs from each semi-final as determined by televoting progress to the final, and a tenth was determined by back-up juries. The European Broadcasting Union (EBU) split up the competing countries into six different pots based on voting patterns from previous contests, with countries with favourable voting histories put into the same pot. On 30 January 2009, an allocation draw was held which placed each country into one of the two semi-finals. Poland was placed into the second semi-final, to be held on 14 May 2009. The running order for the semi-finals was decided through another draw on 16 March 2009 and Poland was set to perform in position 5, following the entry from Serbia and before the entry from Norway.

The second semi-final and the final were broadcast in Poland on TVP1 and TVP Polonia with commentary by Artur Orzech. The Polish spokesperson, who announced the Polish votes during the final, was Radek Brzózka.

=== Semi-final ===
Lidia Kopania took part in technical rehearsals on 4 and 7 May, followed by dress rehearsals on 11 and 12 May. The Polish performance featured Lidia Kopania performing in a long light grey dress joined by a male and female ballet dancer as well as three backing vocalists in long white gowns. The ballet dancers were wrapped in white ribbons at the beginning of the performed but later played with a red ribbon. The stage was predominately dark with the LED screens displaying two images of waterfalls. The stage costumes were designed by designer Maciej Zień, while the choreographer and director for the Polish performance were Anna Milej and Bolesław Pawica, respectively. The ballet dancers that joined Kopania on stage were Daria Akatowa and Maciej Pruszyński, while the backing vocalists were Krzysztof Pietrzak, Jan Radwan and Patrycja Gola.

At the end of the show, Poland was not announced among the ten qualifying entries in the first semi-final and therefore failed to qualify to compete in the final. It was later revealed that Poland placed twelfth in the semi-final, receiving a total of 43 points.

=== Voting ===
Below is a breakdown of points awarded to Poland and awarded by Poland in the second semi-final and grand final of the contest. The nation awarded its 12 points to Azerbaijan in the semi-final and to Norway in the final of the contest.

==== Points awarded to Poland ====
Points awarded to Poland (Semi-final 2)
Score	Country
12 points	
10 points	Ireland
8 points	
7 points	
6 points	Albania; Ukraine
5 points	
4 points	France
3 points	Denmark; Lithuania; Norway; Slovakia
2 points	Netherlands
1 point	Azerbaijan; Greece; Moldova

==== Points awarded by Poland ====
Points awarded by Poland (Semi-final 2)
Score	Country
12 points	Azerbaijan
10 points	Norway
8 points	Estonia
7 points	Ukraine
6 points	Albania
5 points	Moldova
4 points	Lithuania
3 points	Ireland
2 points	Greece
1 point	Denmark

Points awarded by Poland (Final)
Score	Country
12 points	Norway
10 points	Ukraine
8 points	Estonia
7 points	Denmark
6 points	Azerbaijan
5 points	Moldova
4 points	United Kingdom
3 points	Russia
2 points	Armenia
1 point	Iceland

==== Detailed voting results ====
Detailed voting results from Poland (Semi-final 2)
R/O	Country	Televotes	Rank	Points
01	Croatia	1,077	13	
02	Ireland	1,746	8	3
03	Latvia	230	18	
04	Serbia	820	15	
05	Poland			
06	Norway	4,926	2	10
07	Cyprus	1,171	12	
08	Slovakia	1,314	11	
09	Denmark	1,513	10	1
10	Slovenia	417	16	
11	Hungary	392	17	
12	Azerbaijan	16,347	1	12
13	Greece	1,575	9	2
14	Lithuania	2,582	7	4
15	Moldova	2,642	6	5
16	Albania	2,900	5	6
17	Ukraine	3,827	4	7
18	Estonia	4,028	3	8
19	Netherlands	1,025	14	

Detailed voting results from Poland (Final)
R/O	Country	Results					Points
R/O	Country	Jury	Televoting			Combined	Points
R/O	Country	Jury	Votes	Rank	Points	Combined	Points
01	Lithuania		2,898	11			
02	Israel		1,152	22			
03	France	1	2,598	14		1	
04	Sweden		2,528	15			
05	Croatia		1,502	20			
06	Portugal		683	25			
07	Iceland	5	2,995	10	1	6	1
08	Greece		2,842	12			
09	Armenia		5,678	5	6	6	2
10	Russia	2	5,369	6	5	7	3
11	Azerbaijan		19,009	2	10	10	6
12	Bosnia and Herzegovina		1,227	21			
13	Moldova	6	3,559	8	3	9	5
14	Malta		2,078	19			
15	Estonia	4	8,416	3	8	12	8
16	Denmark	12	2,516	16		12	7
17	Germany	3	2,487	17		3	
18	Turkey		2,644	13			
19	Albania		5,178	7	4	4	
20	Norway	10	20,836	1	12	22	12
21	Ukraine	8	7,140	4	7	15	10
22	Romania		1,093	23			
23	United Kingdom	7	3,504	9	2	9	4
24	Finland		2,174	18			
25	Spain		914	24			
