= Lidia Kopania =

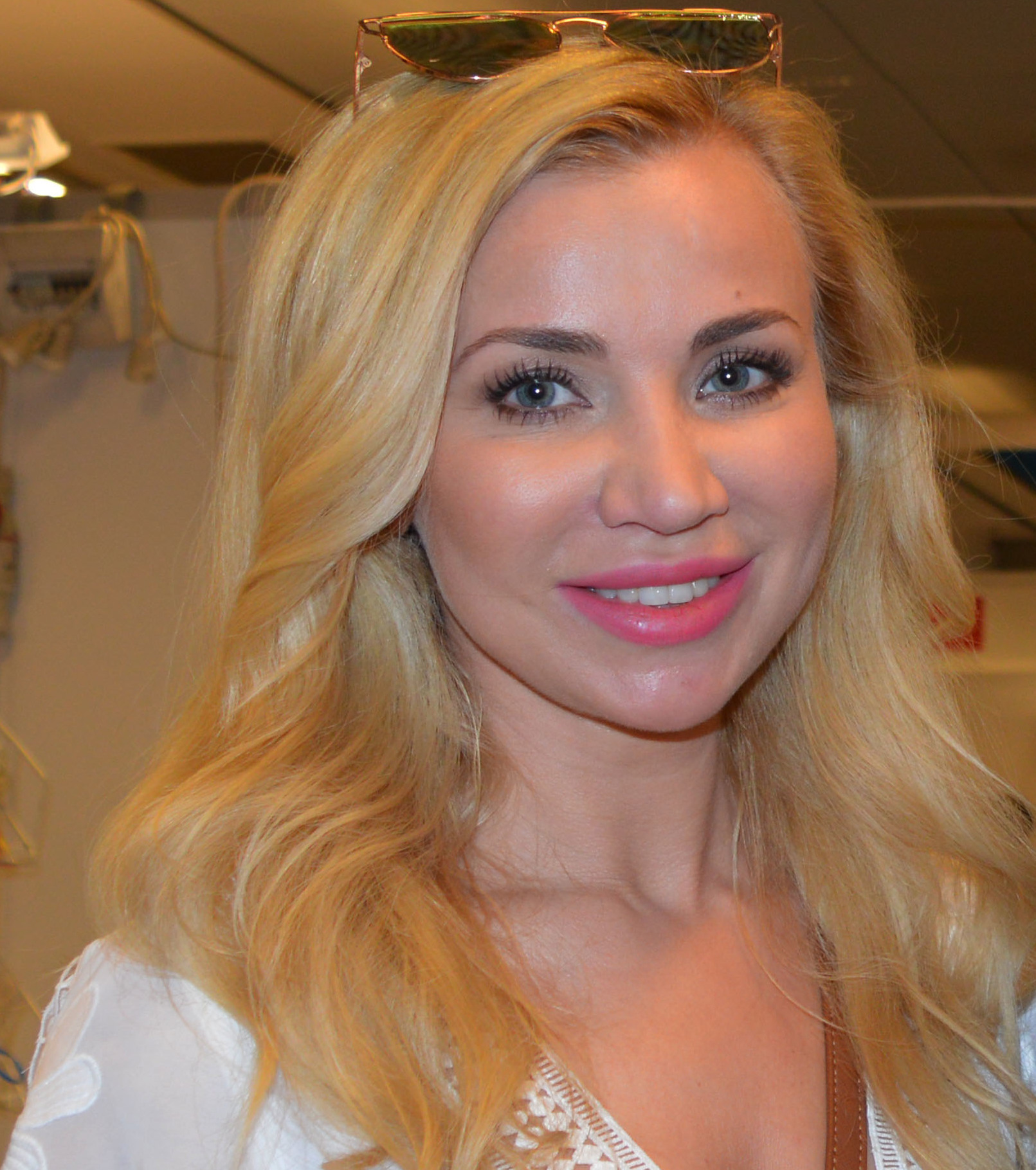
- Kopania in 2017

Background information
- Born: Lidia Kopania; 12 May 1978 (age 48); Koluszki, Poland
- Genre: Pop
- Occupation: Singer
- Label: EMI Music Poland
- Website: Official Webpage

Lidia Kopania-Przebindowska (born 12 May 1978, Koluszki, Poland) is the frontwoman of the musical group Kind of Blue. Kopania had previously represented Poland at the Eurovision Song Contest 2009, held in Moscow, Russia.

== Biography ==
In 2003, Kopania has established cooperation with a band Kind of Blue. Their first joint album, entitled Beating The Morning Rush appeared in Germany at the end of 2004. Participated in the German music program The John Lennon Talent Award. In Poland, the first single of Kopania's band was a song "Pocałuj mnie".

In 2006 she released the album Intuicja, which included 16 pop songs in English and four in Polish. With this release came a CD single "It Must Be Love", which had been submitted for consideration to represent Poland in the Eurovision Song Contest 2007.

Kopania was the winner of TOPtrendy Festival 2006, organized by Telewizja Polsat, which included two tracks - a song written for a single "Sleep" and Abba's cover "The Winner Takes It All". Her next CD Przed świtem appeared in June 2008. Manufacturer album before dawn, which operates a single, Rozmawiać z tobą chcę is Jens Lueck, compositions written by Bernd Klimpel, Filip Sojka, Jens Lueck, Rob Hoffman. In contrast, for the text layer is responsible Lidia.

=== Eurovision Song Contest 2009 ===
In February 2009, Kopania participated in Polish national selection for the Eurovision Song Contest 2009 with the ballad "I Don't Wanna Leave". She won second place in the jury vote and the first in the televoting, thereby winning the national selection and representing Poland at the Eurovision Song Contest 2009 in Moscow. Kopania competed in the second semi-final but failed to reach the final having placed 12th out of 19 with a total of 43 points.

=== Eurovision Song Contest 2022 ===
In 2022, she made a further attempt to represent Poland in Eurovision, participating in that year's Polish national selection with the song "Why Does it Hurt", where she finished in 10th place, with the selection being won by Krystian Ochman.

Her performance was negatively commented on Polish media. It had been speculated that Kopania had forgotten the lyrics of her song, and her facial expressions and gestures during the performance showed that she was aware of the failed performance. The composers of the song, Ylva and Linda Persson, also accused the singer of sabotaging the song, adding that "a good song was wasted". When asked in interviews to comment on the matter, Kopania said that such a performance had been planned, and with the song she wanted to pay tribute to her deceased family members – her father, her brother and her father's sister. Later when asked by different media outlets, she stated that she had been inspired by Monty Python, and that she knew her performance would cause outrage. After the singer's performance, her fan-club founded 14 years prior was disbanded, with its founder informing about the singer's "notorious" lies and suggesting that she needed "treatment for her mental health, which had been damaged for some time." Ylva and Linda Persson were also accused of plagiarising the song "Glitter & Gold" by Rebecca Ferguson, while it was speculated Kopania had not been informed about the copyright infringement of the song.

== Discography ==
=== Albums ===
- 2006 : Intuicja
- 2008 : Przed świtem

=== Singles ===
- 1998 "Niezwykły dar"
- 2006 "Sleep"
- 2006 "Hold On"
- 2007 "Twe milczenie nie jest złotem"
- 2008 "Tamta Łza"
- 2008 "Rozmawiać z tobą chce"
- 2009 "I Don't Wanna Leave"
- 2013 "Hold My Breath And Wait"
- 2020 "W Pomiedzy"
- 2020 "Faith Cannot Be Broken"
- 2021 "Remedy"
- 2021 "Push The Boundaries"
- 2021 "Scars Are Beautiful"
- 2022 "Why Does It Hurt"
- 2023 "Power of Devotion" (with AGE CONNECT)

=== Videos ===
- 2006 "Sleep"
- 2008 "Rozmawiać z tobą chcę"
- 2009 "I Don't Wanna Leave"
- 2013 "Hold My Breath And Wait"

Awards and achievements
Preceded by Isis Gee with "For Life"	Poland in the Eurovision Song Contest; 2009	Succeeded by Marcin Mroziński with "Legenda"
