= Lobo Ismail =

Lobo Ismail لوبو إسماعيل
- Born: Ismail Salah Ismail Lobo; August 11, 1974 (age 52)
- Origin: Zarqa, Jordan
- Genres: Arab dance music, hip hop, Slovak music
- Years active: 2005–present

Ismail Salah Ismail Loub (in Arabic إسماعيل صلاح إسماعيل لوب, in Russian Исмаил Салах Исмаил Тлупов), better known by his stage name Lobo Ismail (in Arabic لوبو إسماعيل) or just Lobo (Arabic لوبو) (born in Zarqa, Jordan on 11 August 1974), is a Jordanian singer who lives in Slovakia.

== Biography ==
Lobo is one of 10 siblings in a Jordanian family from Zarqa of Circassian origin (of the Тлупов family). He had inclination to music, dance and languages from early on. Ismail moved to Slovakia in early 2000s where he started his music career. Ismail lives in Košice, Slovakia.

Lobo's 2008 "One More Night (Salam Aleikom)" appears in Future Dance Hits (2008)

== Discography ==
=== Albums ===
- Ty Si Moja Láska
- Lobo

=== Singles / Videos ===
- "Bain el Asr wal Maghreb"
- "Everybody"
- "Aïcha"
- "One More Night (Salam Aleikom)"
  - "Salam Aleikom" (feat Emily)
- "Ty Si Moja Láska"
- "Len S Tebou Sa Dá" (a duo collaboration with Peter Kotuľa)
- "Suzanna"
- "Meniny"
- "Let's Dance (Musicaaa)"
