= Peter Kotuľa =

- Birth name: Peter Kotuľa
- Born: 11 March 1982 (age 43)
- Origin: Bratislava, Czechoslovakia
- Genres: Pop, R&B, Fusion
- Occupation(s): Singer, songwriter, record producer, musician
- Instrument(s): Vocals, piano, guitar
- Years active: 2005–present
- Labels: Sony BMG
- Website: www.peterkotula.com

Peter Kotuľa (born 11 March 1982 in Bratislava, Czechoslovakia) is a Slovak musician and an artist. He was in the finals of Slovensko hľadá SuperStar ("Slovakia is searching for a SuperStar") in 2005, and immediately following released a very successful album entitled Poď so mnou on Sony BMG. He also tried unsuccessfully to represent Slovakia in Eurovision Song Contest 2009 with the song "Cesty sú stratené"

== Discography ==
=== Albums ===
- 2005: Poď so mnou (on Sony BMG)

Tracks:

1. Bláznivá jazda
2. Je to o tebe
3. Amor nedochví¾ny
4. Hlavu strácam
5. Tak ako
6. Nestra svoju tvár
7. Keï sníva Boh
8. Poï so mnou
9. Business Man
10. Párty
11. Nádej
12. Tak ako (Orchestra mix)

=== Singles ===
- "Tak ako" (feat. Tina)
- "Je to o tebe"
- "Cesty su stratene"

featured in

- "Len s tebou sa dá" (Lobo Ismail feat. Peter Kotuľa)

== Collaborations ==
Peter Kotuľa has collaborated with a number of artists

- He has a duo with Tina in "Tak Ako"
- He is featured as a duo with Lobo Ismail in "Len S Tebou Sa Dá"
- He contributed with the track "Scifi žena" in rapper DNA's 2010 album Revolucionár. The track was produced by Palio

== See also ==
- The 100 Greatest Slovak Albums of All Time
