= Nela Pocisková =

Slovak singer (born 1990)

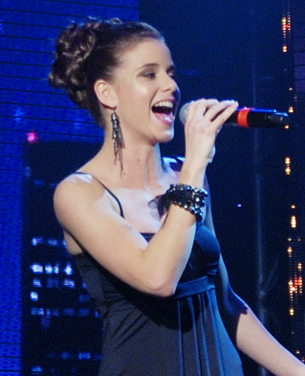

Background information
- Born: 4 October 1990 (age 35); Bratislava, Czechoslovakia
- Occupation: Singer
- Instrument: Vocals
- Years active: 2007–present
- Website: nelapociskova.com

Nela Pocisková (born 4 October 1990) is a Slovak singer and actress. She represented Slovakia at the Eurovision Song Contest 2009 with Kamil Mikulčík.

== Biography ==
Nela Pocisková was born on 4 October 1990 in Bratislava. She started singing at the age of 8.

In 2010, she won the fourth season of Let's Dance, the Slovak version of Dancing with the Stars.

== Personal life ==
From 2011 to 2012 she dated the director Ján Ďurovčík. In 2013 she started dated the actor Filip Tůma. They have two children. Pocisková was raised Roman Catholic.

== Singles ==
- 2009: Leť tmou (& Kamil Mikulčík)
- 2010: Posledný deň (& Vladis)
- 2011: Neviem sa nájsť
- 2012: So in Love
- 2013: Mysterious boy

== Albums ==
- 2013: WAR

== Charts ==
Year	Song	(Slovakia) SK Top 100	(Slovakia) SK Top 50	Album
2009	"Leť tmou" (& Kamil Mikulčík)	–	33	–
2011	"Neviem sa nájsť"	83	16	–
2012	"So in Love"	1	1	–
2013	"Mysterious Boy"	34	5	WAR

== Awards ==
Year	Nominated work(s)	Award	Category	Result
People's Choice polls
2011	Herself	OTO Awards	*Singer	Won
2012	Herself	OTO Awards	*Actress	#3

== See also ==
- The 100 Greatest Slovak Albums of All Time

Awards and achievements
Preceded by Katarína Hasprová with "Modlitba"	Slovakia in the Eurovision Song Contest; 2009 (with Kamil Mikulčík)	Succeeded by Kristína with "Horehronie"
