= Metalinda =

Slovak rock band

- Origin: Bratislava, Czechoslovakia now Slovakia
- Genres: Power metal; hard rock
- Years active: 1983–present
- Label: MetaMusic
- Members: Peter Sámel; František Gašparík; Peter Kollar; Andy Samuel Hudak
- Past members: Vlado Suchán; Dušan Horecký; Michal Kovalčík; Ján Lapoš; Pavol Drapák; Ľubo Šimkovič; Peter Kertvel; Jožo Szelle; Roman Pecha; Patrik Imre; Roman Čief; Dušan Obenrauch; Ľubomír Lichý; Tibor Fuzek; Martin Cepka; Márius Bartoň; Ľubo Šimkovič; Jaroslav Mojžiš
- Website: Official website

Metalinda is a Slovak rock band from Bratislava, founded in 1983 by former members of the bands Haluška and Regatta. The original lineup consisted of Peter Sámel on guitar, Ján Lapoš on drums, Vlado Suchán on bass, and Dušan Horecký on vocals. Early success led to sold-out concert halls in Bratislava and later in other cities, and eventually the band entered the studio, where they recorded their first singles, "Únik" and "Klub Milionárov", in 1985.

== Biography ==
After the band's initial success on the live circuit, they received an offer from music publishing house Opus Records to record their first single. In 1986, Horecký was replaced by Pavol Drapák as lead vocalist. The band recorded their next single, "Každý chce ľúbiť", and won fourth place at the Bratislavská lýra music festival with the song "Loď pre 5 miliárd". At this point, Drapák exited the band. Several vocalists were trialled, including Tibor Fuzek, who had previously worked with the group Kobra; Fuzek brought with him Metalinda's second guitarist, Michal Kovalčík. In 1988, Paľo Drapák returned. During this period, Vlad Suchán was replaced by Martin Cepka.

1990 saw the release of Metalinda's debut self-titled album, and in 1991, their sophomore effort, Za všetky prachy came out; the record was released on the Czech label Tommü Records and produced by Jožo Ráž and Július Kinček. The most famous song from the album was "Zaľúbená žaba", with a video starring Czech actress Anna Geislerová. The band's third album, Svetlo na druhom brehu, came out in 1992. On the concert tour to promote the record, Metalinda spoke out against drug addiction. Martin Cepka was replaced by Márius Bartoň during the tour, who was then in turn replaced by Fero Gašparík.

Metalinda released their fourth album, Láska holých prenáša, in 1994. Michal Kovalčík subsequently left the band, and Metalinda again became a quartet with only one guitarist. Their fifth album, Maj May (1995), was released on the band's own music label MetaMusic. 15,000 copies were sold in the first four months alone. During the concert tour, Metalinda recorded material for their first concert album, which was released in the same year under the title Noc s Metalindou. This concert debut was followed by the studio album Na kolenách.

After this period, drummer Ján Lapoš left the band. This was followed by another studio album, Skús sa do mňa zahryznúť in 1996. In 1999, the band released their first compilation, called Hitovky. Zavesení v prievane followed in 2000, and singer Pavol Drapák left the group again. Metalinda organized a contest to find a new vocalist, and Roman Čief won the spot, joining the band on their next concert tour.

In 2003, Metalinda released a double album called Tutovky, of which one is a CD with new songs and the other is a loose continuation of Hitovky, including some re-recorded tracks. In September 2003, former vocalist Dušan Horecký returned to the band, replacing Roman Čief. In 2005, Metalinda released the album Biológia. Horecký left again in 2006, and was replaced by Patrik Imre. In 2007, the album No. 13 came out, featuring a collaboration with Ráž on the track called "Nebo zastav dážď". In 2012, a new vocalist, Jaroslav Mojžiš, joined the band, and recorded the acoustic album The Best Unplugged.

In 2016, singer Andy Samuel Hudak joined the group.

In 2019, Metalinda's sixteenth studio album, entitled Moja hviezda žije, was released.

== Band members ==
Current

- Peter Sámel – guitar
- František Gašparík – bass
- Peter Kollar – drums
- Andy Samuel Hudak – vocals

Past

- Dušan Obenrauch – drums
- Ján Lapoš – drums
- Vlado Suchán – bass
- Dušan Horecký – vocals
- Pavol Drapák – vocals
- Tibor Fuzek – vocals
- Michal Kovalčík – guitar
- Martin Cepka – bass
- Márius Bartoň – bass
- Peter Kertvel – drums
- Roman Čief – vocals
- Patrik Imre – vocals
- Ľubo Šimkovič – bass
- Jožo Szelle – guitar
- Roman Pecha – bass
- Jaroslav Mojžiš – vocals

== Discography ==
Studio albums

- Metalinda (1990)
- Za všetky prachy (1991)
- Svetlo na druhom brehu (1992)
- Láska holých prenáša (1994)
- Maj May (1995)
- Na kolenách (1996)
- Skús sa do mna zahryznúť (1998)
- Zavesení v prievane (2000)
- Tutovky (2003 2-CD)
- Biológia (2005)
- No. 13 (2007)
- Moja hviezda žije (2019)

Compilations

- Hitovky (1999)
- Tutovky (2003 2-CD)
- Best Of (2010)
- The Best Unplugged (2013)

Live albums

- Noc s Metalindou (1996)

Singles

- "Únik"
- "Klub Milionárov"/"Únik" (1985)
- "Každý chce ľúbiť"/"Loď pre 5 miliárd" (1986)
- "Kovový kráľ"/"Jago" (1989)
- "Svet Anjelov" (2008)
- "Sloboda" (2015)
