= Face TV (New Zealand) =

New Zealand television channel

- Country: New Zealand
- Headquarters: Auckland

Programming
- Picture format: 576i 4:3/16:9 (native/anamorphic)

History
- Launched: February 1, 2013
- Replaced: Triangle TV; Triangle Stratos

Links
- Website: www.facetv.co.nz

Face TV is a public service television station based in Auckland, New Zealand. It broadcasts on the Sky Network Television as of December 2013 ASO. Previously, Triangle has broadcast across Auckland on analogue UHF (before December 2013 ASO) via a government-owned UHF channel reserved for non-commercial regional television from transmitters at Waiatarua, Pinehill and Remuera.

== Description ==
The station is a registered charity supported by the Lion Foundation and Foundation North. Airtime is leased out to volunteer and professional programme providers on a first-come, first-served basis. Providers are allowed to air a limited number of commercials (a maximum of 6 minutes per half-hour of broadcast) during their programmes, and have complete editorial control over content. The trust claims these rules mean it "cannot be controlled by individuals or groups with their own agendas".

== Triangle Television ==
Triangle TV
- Country: New Zealand
- Headquarters: Auckland

Programming
- Picture format: 576i 4:3/16:9 (native/anamorphic)

Ownership
- Owner: Triangle Television Trust

History
- Launched: August 1, 1998
- Closed: January 31, 2013
- Replaced by: Face TV

Links
- Website: tritv.co.nz

Availability

Terrestrial
- Free-to-air SD

Streaming media
- EcastTV Free-to-air SD

Triangle made its first test transmission on the morning of 24 July 1998. Some SKY UHF subscribers with older decoders received its signal instead of that of Sky Sport precisely when it was having its coverage of the 50th rugby test match between New Zealand and South Africa; Sky had to review the issue on 27 July. The station was funded with a NZ$500,000 fund from the Lottery Grants Board and private organisations; whereas Michael Horton provided services.

As initially planned, Triangle started regular broadcasts on 1 August 1998 on UHF channel 41 in Auckland, six hours a day, but aimed to increase into a full 24-hour schedule over time. On 11 August, it aired its first bilingual programme, Pasefika i Niu Sila (Pacific in New Zealand) with segments in English and Samoan (though most of the content was in English), sponsored by Samoana, a local Pacific newspaper. Tongan and Māori segments were also planned. A Tongan programme, Friendly Islands Vision, began on 4 October; the programme was symbolically opened by the Queen of Tonga, Halaevalu Mataʻaho ʻAhomeʻe. Six months after launch, the station broke even.

As of 2003, the channel's website was witnessing a sharp increase in visits. In early March, it received a warrant for a station in Wellington; its launch pended consultancy with local groups. In April, it started broadcasting on another UHF frequency on channel 52, increasing its coverage to five more Auckland neighborhoods—Remuera, One Tree Hill, Ellerslie, Newmarket and parts of Mt. Eden—increasing the potential viewing audience from 160,000 to 1,3 million.

On 25 November 2006, the channel began to air selected programmes from the newly-launched Al Jazeera English on both its Auckland and Wellington stations.

In July 2007, Triangle struck a deal with Kordia to broadcast on the nationwide Freeview network upon launch. Broadcasts began on the new platform on 3 October.

== Stratos Television ==
Triangle Stratos
- Country: New Zealand
- Headquarters: Auckland

Programming
- Picture format: 576i 4:3/16:9 (native/anamorphic)

Ownership
- Sister channels: Triangle TV

History
- Launched: October 3, 2007
- Closed: December 23, 2011
- Replaced by: Face TV

Links
- Website: www.stratostv.co.nz

Availability

Terrestrial
- Free-to-air SD

Triangle also operated Stratos Television between 2007 and 2011. It was broadcast around New Zealand on the Freeview, Sky and TelstraClear cable digital platforms. This was a free-to-air, twenty-four-hour, nationwide news and culture public broadcasting service.

It launched at 12:30pm on 3 October 2007, alongside Triangle on Freeview.

It was shut down on 23 December 2011 due to funding complications, because as the channel grew in viewership so did its ratings share and since Freeview carriage charges are ratings based there was a number of increases to fees Triangle as paying to the Kordia operated Freeview service.

As of November 23, 2012 Sky offered Triangle an undisclosed deal to re-launch Stratos under the name Face TV. The service was launched on February 1, 2013. The service, unlike Stratos, simulcast the current Triangle schedule with national advertising options. Using an IP link provided by government-owned Kordia and a government-owned non-commercial UHF channel due to expire in December 2013, Triangle Television also broadcast a similar station across Wellington (operated out of Auckland) from 25 August 2006 to 31 March 2009. The channels shared transmission facilities and resources, and broadcast many of the same news, regional, and cultural programming.

== Programming ==
=== Special broadcasts ===
- Election Results Show from RNZ 2017
- APRA Silver Scroll Awards
- New Zealand vs England test cricket (2008 Sky Sport 1 simulcast)
- Eurovision Song Contest (2009, 2010, 2011)
- Jewel in the Palace (2009)
- Oceania Football Confederation (2009, 2010)
- Midnight Mass from the Vatican (2009)
- Australian Rules Football (2011, 2012)

=== English language newscasts ===
Refer to station schedules for broadcast times.

Programme	Provider
PBS NewsHour	PBS, United States
DW News	DW-TV, Germany
euronews	euronews, European Union
Democracy Now!	Democracy Now!, United States

=== Foreign language newscasts ===
Programme	Provider	Language
DW Noticias	DW-TV, Germany	Spanish
DW Das Journal	DW-TV, Germany	German
NOS Journaal	NOS, Netherlands	Dutch
Le Journal	France 2	French
