= Kamil Mikulčík =

Slovak singer and actor (born 1977)

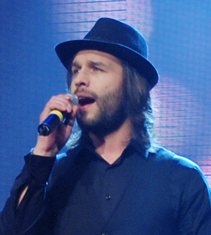

Background information
- Born: November 18, 1977 (age 47)
- Origin: Slovakia
- Occupation(s): Singer, actor
- Instrument: Vocals

Kamil Mikulčík (born November 18, 1977) is a Slovak singer and actor who represented Slovakia at the Eurovision Song Contest 2009 with Nela Pocisková. They failed to reach the final.

== Personal life ==
In 2009, Mikulčík married Czech Lion-nominee actress Kristína Farkašová, whom he divorced the following year (2010).

== Filmography ==
Year	Title	Role	Notes
2001	Behind Enemy Lines	Tiger No. 1	
2010	Legenda o Lietajúcom Cypriánovi	Painter	
2015	Spievankovo 5: O povolaniach		

== See also ==
- The 100 Greatest Slovak Albums of All Time

Awards and achievements
Preceded by Katarína Hasprová with "Modlitba"	Slovakia in the Eurovision Song Contest; 2009 (with Nela Pocisková)	Succeeded by Kristina with "Horehronie"
