= Ana Bebić =

Croatian pop singer

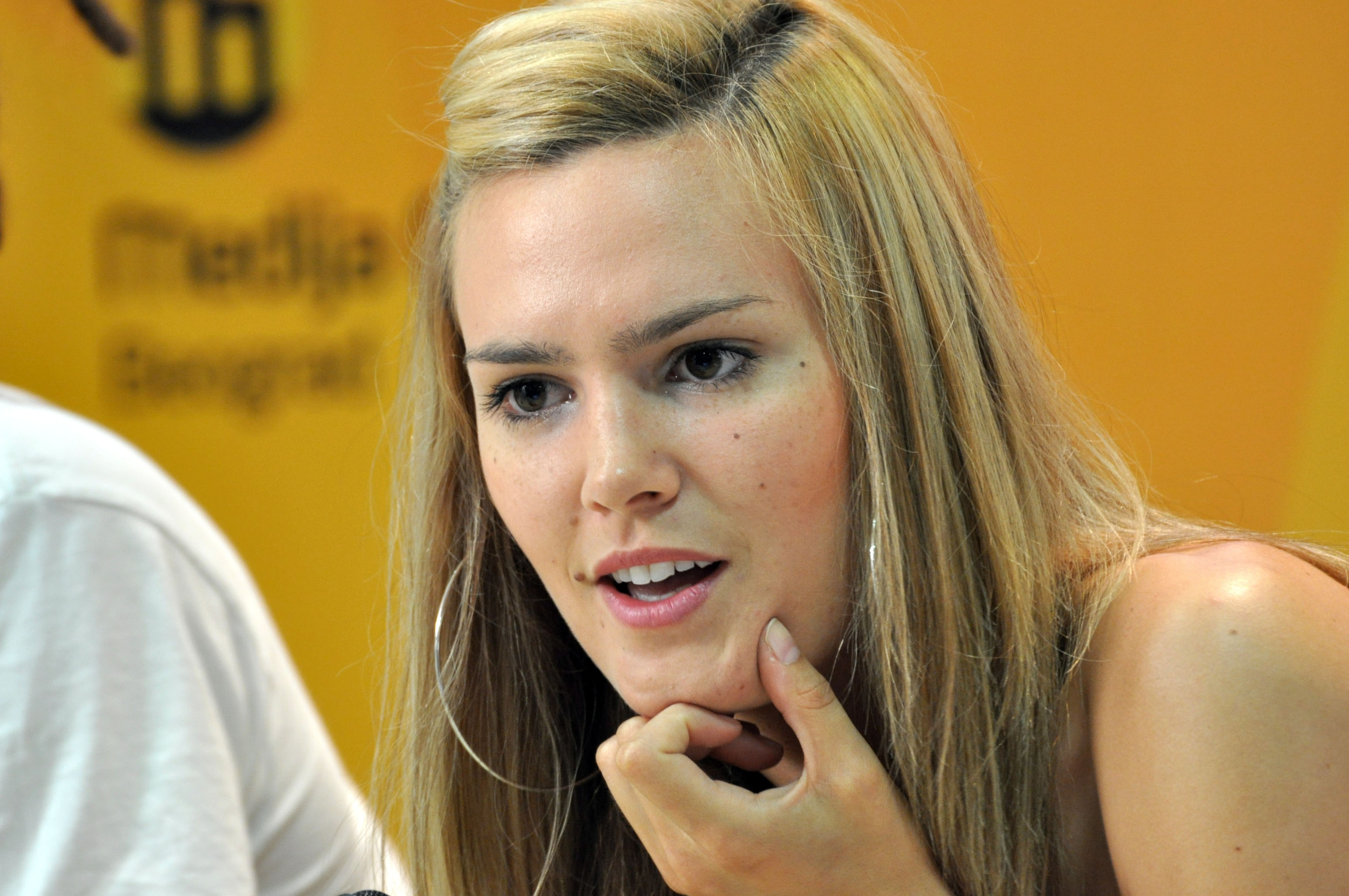
- Bebić in June 2010

Background information
- Born: Ana Bebić; May 7, 1986 (age 40); Metković, SR Croatia, Yugoslavia
- Origin: Croatia
- Genres: Pop, pop rock
- Occupations: Singer, television personality
- Instrument: Vocals
- Years active: 2008—present
- Label: Melody Music

Ana Đolić (née Bebić; born 7 May 1986) is a Croatian singer, who participated in television shows such as Hrvatski Idol, Ne zaboravi stihove!, and finally Operacija trijumf, which was shown in five countries. Her debut single, "Preživjet ću", reached number one in Serbia in 2009.

== Early life ==
Ana Bebić was born on May 7, 1986, in Metković, Croatia, as the third and youngest child in the Bebić family. She has two siblings, Zrinka and Ivan. Bebić has shown interest in music and dance since her early age. However, sport was her first love, and she played handball, as her hometown Metković is known for many successful handball players. After years of professional training, Bebić decided to pursue her music career, despite a lack of musical education.

== Career ==
=== Early career, Hrvatski Idol and Ne zaboravi stihove! ===
Bebić debuted at the Glas Neretve musical festival with the song "Dodirni mi kolena" by Zana, and won the audience's award. Two years later she took part in the same festival alongside her brother Ivan; they sang the song "Ima li nade za nas" and won the same award. Bebić then took part in Melodije Juga festival and won the "Best Debut" award, and a year after alongside her father Zoran she sang "Cvite moj" at the same festival. Bebić also took part in festivals such as Marko Polo and Mostar. She recorded songs "Kad odu moje prijateljice" and "Zastave", and, with the band Adastra, covered the song "Sladoled" by Prljavo Kazalište.

Bebić then participated in talent show Hrvatski Idol, the Croatian version of Pop Idol. In the show, she performed "Spiderwebs" by No Doubt, "Papa Don't Preach" by Madonna, and "Srebrni" by Flare, and placed 6th. Her participation was her debut and considered to be a great result. Bebić then appeared in Ne zaboravi stihove!, the Croatian version of Don't Forget the Lyrics!. She performed "Na po' mi srce živi" by Danijela Martinović, "Ti si mene" by Dino Merlin and Nina Badrić and "Budim se" by Meritas, and won the award of HRK100,000.

=== 2008—2009: Operacija trijumf ===
Operacija trijumf is a regional reality/talent show based on Fame Academy held in Belgrade and is considered Ana's biggest break, considering it was watched by five countries in the Western Balkan – Serbia, Montenegro, Croatia, Bosnia and Herzegovina and Macedonia. Ana was one of the six semi-finalists and she got evicted just a day before the final. Ana spent 99 days in the house. During the time she performed in 14 gala nights and she was a special guest at the final, where she premiered her new song "Preživjet ću".

Even though she was evicted just a day before the final, she was given a chance to perform one out of 3 songs she was preparing for the evening. The song was Frozen by Madonna. Also, she was one of two students (the other being Milica Majstorović) who got to present their own songs for the first Operacija trijumf compilation. This song is "Preživjet ću". The song got positive reviews by the jury and the audience.

During her stay in the show she performed:

- Anastacia — "Heavy on My Heart"/"Sick & Tired"/"I'm Outta Love" with the students Nina Petković and Milica Majstorović (Gala 1)
- Severina — "Tridesete" (Gala 2)
- Dado Topić and Slađana Milošević — "Princeza" with the student Nikola Sarić (Gala 3)
- Elena Risteska — "Ninanajna" with Elena Risteska (Gala 4)
- Robbie Williams and Kylie Minogue — "Kids" with the student Vukašin Brajić (Gala 5)
- Negative — "Ti me ne voliš" (Gala 6)
- Beyoncé Knowles featuring Jay-Z — "Crazy in Love" (Gala 7)
- Pink — "Get the Party Started" (Gala 8)
- Danijela Martinović — "Pleši sa mnom" with Danijela Martinović (Gala 9)
- Cyndi Lauper — "True Colors" (Gala 10)
- John Travolta and Olivia Newton-John — "You're the One That I Want" with the student Nikola Paunović (Gala 10)
- Pink — "So What" with the students Sonja Bakić and Nina Petković (Gala 10)
- Britney Spears — "Womanizer (Gala 11)
- Queen — "We Will Rock You"/"We Are the Champions" with the students Danijel Pavlović, Vukašin Brajić, Sonja Bakić and Nikola Sarić (Gala 11)
- Christina Aguilera, Lil' Kim, Pink, Mýa and Missy Elliott — "Lady Marmalade" with the student Sonja Bakić and Karolina Gočeva (Gala 11)
- Aleksandra Radović — "Nisi moj" with Aleksandra Radović (Gala 12)
- Prljavo kazalište/VIS Idoli — "Mi plešemo"/"Maljčiki" with the students Igor Cukrov and Vukašin Brajić (Gala 12)
- Rihanna/Soft Cell/Rihanna — "SOS"/"Tainted Love"/"Disturbia" with the students Nina Petković and Sonja Bakić (Gala 12)
- Milena Vučić — "Luče" with Milena Vučić (Gala 13)
- Jelena Tomašević — "Oro with the student Nina Petković and Jelena Tomašević (Gala 13)
- Katy Perry — "I Kissed a Girl"/"Hot n Cold" with the student Nina Petković (Gala 13)
- Moloko — "Sing It Back"/"Familiar Feelings" (Semi-finals)
- ET — "Tek je 12 sati" & "Sve bih dala da znam" with the student Nina Petković (Semi-finals)
- Madonna — "Frozen" (Finals, revival)
- Ana Bebić — "Preživjet ću" (Finals, revival)

=== 2009—present: Upcoming solo album ===
Ana Bebić performed her debut single, "Preživjet ću", at the final gala event of the Operacija trijumf, held on January 5, 2009, in Belgrade, Serbia. It was very well received by both audience and the jury. In the first week it was Radio B92's No. 1 most played song of the week. Bebić is currently working on her solo album in Belgrade; it will be written and produced by Filip Miletić and Miloš Roganović, the writers of her hit "Preživjet ću". It would be released in 2009 in Croatia and Serbia. She would also record an English version of "Preživjet ću", which will be included on the Operacija trijumf compilation.

Her Operacija Trijumf participation enabled her to work with producers Miro Buljan i Nenad Ninčević and create the song "Mrzim spore stvari" that will fulfill Ana's dream of performing at the Dora Festival, the Croatian preselection for the 2009 Eurovision Song Contest. On February 27, 2009, the final night of the festival was held. Ana eventually ended up 12th receiving 11 points from the televote and 2 points from the jury. The song received mixed reviews, being called brilliant by some, but childish by others. Nevertheless, the song got great response with the audience.

Alongside her Operacija trijumf colleague Danijel Pavlović, Bebić appeared in one episode of television show Leteći start, which is produced by Emotion. It was also announced on June 8, 2009, that she would take part in Sunčane Skale festival in Herceg Novi, alongside her Operacija trijumf colleagues Danijel Pavlović and Milica Majstorović with the song "Rođeni sa greškom", written by Emina Jahović. The song was released on the internet on June 27, 2009. The final night of the festival was held on July 8, 2009. The trio placed the eight with 39 points. In September 2009, it was announced Bebić and Majstorović would make cameo appearances in television series Žene sa Dedinja. Bebić joined Croatian singer Severina Vučković on the stage during her tour performance in Belgrade, performing Vučković's song "Prijateljice" with Severina herself and Nataša Bekvalac. She has performed several times in many of Emotions TV programs such as "Sve za ljubav" and "Veliki Brat".

Ana entered Veliki Brat VIP 4, the celebrity edition of the Balkan version of Big Brother on January 30, 2010. She was the first housemate to get evicted, after a week spent on the show. She lost out to Macedonia's celebrity Boki 13.

On June 16, 2010, Belgrade tabloids reported that the side window of Ana's car was broken the day before by unknown perpetrator(s) while the car was parked in Lamartine's street in the Vračar neighbourhood in Belgrade, speculating the reason might have been that the vehicle was carrying Croatian license plates. Regarding the incident Ana said: "I feel great in the capital of Serbia, being accepted wonderfully by all. Belgrade is a free and open city and I don't want to believe that someone acted loutish and broke my car window only because it [car] has Dubrovnik license plates."

On June 21, 2010, Ana performed at the Belgrade World Music Day celebration which was held on three stages in Serbia's capital.

== Personal and media life ==
Bebić was raised as a Roman Catholic. During the Operacija trijumf, she was romantically linked with contestants Adnan Babajić, Nikola Sarić, Đorđe Gogov and Nikola Paunović. Bebić joked she has "two boyfriends" — Nikola Paunović for the media, and one for the privacy. Her "private" boyfriend is songwriter Filip Miletić, who was then working on Bebić's first solo album. Bebić was voted No. 1 at the Index.hr poll of the most beautiful women in Croatia.

Since 2008, she has been residing in Belgrade, Serbia.

In January 2010, she took a role in Serbian Big Brother – Veliki Brat show on RTV Pink.

In October 2011, she entered the study of media in one private university in Belgrade.

She married Ivan Đolić, a Serbian IT expert, in late 2017. They have two sons: Andrija and Matija.

== Discography ==
=== Singles ===
- 2004: "Kad odu moje prijateljice"
- 2007: "Moja mala voli r'n'r" (with Nenad Kero)
- 2008: "Sladoled" (with Adastra)
- 2009: "Preživjet ću"
- 2009: "Mrzim spore stvari"
- 2009: "Rođeni sa greškom" (with Danijel Pavlović and Milica Majstorović)
- 2010: "Sve za ljubav" (with Igor Cukrov, Milica Majstorović and Djordje Gogov)
- 2011: "Litar vina" (with Flamingosi)
- 2012: "Italiana" (with Severina and Riccardo Longo)
- 2014: "Smiley"
- 2015. "Dilema"
- 2015. "Jugoslavija" (with Željko Vasić)
