= Nina Petković =

Montenegrin singer

Nina Petković Нина Петковић
- Born: Nina Petković; 10 April 1981 (age 44); Kotor, SR Montenegro, Yugoslavia
- Origin: Tivat, Montenegro
- Genres: pop, Europop, rock, pop rock, R&B, dance
- Occupations: Singer, songwriter, composer, television personality
- Instruments: Vocals, drums
- Years active: 2008–present
- Label: Melody Music

Nina Petković (Montenegrin Cyrillic: Нина Петковић; born 10 April 1981) is a Montenegrin singer, musician and television personality. She came to media prominence in regional Star Academy version, Operacija trijumf, and came fourth.

== Early life ==
Although born in Kotor, Petković was mostly raised in neighboring town of Tivat. She is of mixed religious origin – her father is a Roman Catholic and mother Orthodox Christian. Before she participated in Operacija trijumf, Petković took part in many festivals, such as Evropesma and Montevizija, sometimes solo, sometimes with her band Dan Poslije.

== Career ==
=== Operacija trijumf ===
The Operacija trijumf, Balkan version of Endemol's Fame Academy, started broadcasting on 29 September 2008. Nina Petković was the only contestant from Montenegro, so she was constantly receiving a lot of cell-phone votes from Montenegro. She reached the finals, but was expelled in the first final round.

Petković was performing with many popular artists during the Operacija trijumf, such as Željko Joksimović, Jelena Tomašević, Jelena Rozga, Karolina Gočeva and Negative.

During the Operacija trijumf, Petković performed the following songs:

- (United States) Anastacia – "Heavy on My Heart" / "Sick & Tired" / "I'm Outta Love" with the students Ana Bebić and Milica Majstorović (Gala 1)
- (Serbia) Željko Joksimović – "Lane moje" with Željko Joksimović (Gala 2)
- (Croatia) Magazin – "Care" with Magazin (Gala 3)
- (Sweden) ABBA – "Mamma Mia" with the student Milica Majstorović (Gala 4)
- (Bosnia and Herzegovina) Kemal Monteno & (Croatia) Danijela Martinović – "Ovako ne mogu dalje" with Kemal Monteno (Gala 5)
- (Serbia) Negative – "Bez promene" with Negative (Gala 6)
- (United States) No Doubt – "Don't Speak" (Gala 7)
- (Croatia) Colonia – "Mirno more" with Colonia (Gala 8)
- (Croatia) Danijela Martinović – "Neka mi ne svane" with Danijela Martinović (Gala 9)
- (Croatia) Jelena Rozga – "Daj šta daš" with Jelena Rozga (Gala 10)
- (United States) Pink – "So What" (Gala 10)
- (North Macedonia) Karolina Gočeva – "Mojot svet" with Karolina Gočeva (Gala 11)
- (Canada) Céline Dion – "My Heart Will Go On" with the student Igor Cukrov (Gala 11)
- (Serbia) Aleksandra Radović – "Čuvam te" with Aleksandra Radović (Gala 12)
- (Montenegro) Danijel Popović/ (United Kingdom) Culture Club – "Džuli" / "Karma Chameleon" with the student Aleksandar Belov (Gala 12)
- (Serbia) Milena Vučić – "Da l' ona zna" with Milena Vučić (Gala 13)
- (Serbia) Jelena Tomašević – "Oro" with Jelena Tomašević and the student Ana Bebić (Gala 13)
- (United States) Katy Perry – "I Kissed a Girl" / "Hot n Cold" with the student Ana Bebić (Gala 13)
- (Republic of Ireland) Sinéad O'Connor – "Nothing Compares 2 U" (Semifinal)
- (Croatia) ET – "Tek je 12 sati" / "Sve bih dala da znam" with the student Ana Bebić (Semifinal)
- (United Kingdom) Paul McCartney and (United Kingdom) Wings – "Live and Let Die" with the finalists Adnan Babajić, Aleksandar Belov, Vukašin Brajić and Danijel Pavlović (Final)
- (Serbia) Oktobar 1864 – "Nađi me" (Final)

=== Present ===
It was almost certain that Petković will take part in the Montevizija 2009, the Montenegro's national choice for the representer at the Eurovision Song Contest 2009 in Moscow. However, RTCG confirmed on 23 January 2009 that Montenegro in the Eurovision Song Contest 2009 will be represented by Andrea Demirović with the song "Just Get Out of My Life". Soon after the end of Operacija trijumf, Petković appeared on a number of talk shows on television programs such as TV Pink, TV In and TV Avala.

Alongside her Operacija trijumf contestant Sonja Bakić, Petković recorded a song named "Samo". On 8 June 2009 she won Pjesma Mediterana, music festival in Budva, with the song "S druge strane sna"; Petković also received a special award by Story magazine's internet poll "The Favourite of the Festival".

She attempted to represent Montenegro in the Eurovision Song Contest two times. First time was in 2018 with the song "Dišem" receiving the last place in the Montevizija 2018. In 2019 she competed with the song "Uzmi ili ostavi" and she got the 4th place, failing again to represent her country.

== Personal life ==
Petković admires Roger Waters, Alanis Morissette and Oliver Mandić; she stated she finds herself in the song "Comfortably Numb". Petković is a very good friends with Sonja Bakić, other Operacija trijumf contestant. Nina is the long-term relationship with a member of the band Dan poslije.

== Discography ==
=== Albums ===
- 2009: Upcoming compilation of Operacija trijumf contestants

=== Singles ===
- 2009: "Samo" (feat. Sonja Bakić)
- 2009: "S druge strane sna"
- 2009: "Bezobrazno"
- 2010: "Ne odustajem" (Pjesma Mediterana 2010)
- 2018: "Dišem"
- 2019: "Uzmi ili ostavi"
- 2020: "Dance till I die"

Awards and achievements
Preceded by Ivan Čanović	Pjesma Mediterana winner 2009	Succeeded by Dado Topić & Slađana Milošević
