= Ljubavi (Željko Joksimović song) =

2009 Serbian pop rock song

Single by Željko Joksimović

from the album Ljubavi
- Released: October 2009
- Recorded: 2009
- Genre: Pop-rock
- Length: 4:56
- Label: Minacord; City Records
- Composer(s): Željko Joksimović
- Lyricist(s): Momčilo Bajagić
- Producer(s): Željko Joksimović

Željko Joksimović singles chronology
"Nije Do Mene" (2007)	"Ljubavi" (2009)	"Žena Za Sva Vremena" (2010)

"Ljubavi" (Serbian: Љубави, lit. 'My Love') is the first single from the fifth studio album by Serbian singer-songwriter and music producer Željko Joksimović with the same name. The composer of the song is Željko Joksimović by himself, and the lyrics are written by Momčilo Bajagić – Bajaga. From its release, the song is well charting in most ex-Yugoslav charts.

== Background ==
In 2007 Joksimović released greatest hits compilation Platinum Collection. In this CD were included two new singles too – "Nije Do Mene" and "Devojka". From then he made a pause on his career for two years. After pausing he made his comeback with this single. In October 2009 "Ljubavi" was aired in all the radio stations not just around Serbia, but Montenegro, Bosnia & Herzegovina, Macedonia and Croatia too. The song was accepted with generally positive critics around these countries.

== Composition ==
The song is written in C minor. Joksimović's vocal range extends from C_{3} to G#_{4}

"Ljubavi" is a pop ballad sang in Serbian language. The music and the arrangement is made by Joksimović himself and the lyrics are written by the Serbian singer Bajaga who is a former member of the band Riblja Čorba.

== Music video ==
The music video for the song was shot in the period October–November 2009. It features Joksimović singing alone at a train station, where he then gets on the train where he continues to sing. The video had a mini-concert promotion on 9 December 2009 in the Expo center in Belgrade. He opened the concert with the song and corresponding video, saying that he started it with this song because it is full of emotion. Of the promotion guests, some were people from the Serbian music scene.

== Release history ==
Country	Date	Language
Bosnia and Herzegovina	October 2009	Serbian
Croatia	October 2009	Serbian
Macedonia	October 2009	Serbian
Montenegro	October 2009	Serbian
Serbia	October 2009	Serbian
