= The Best of Željko Joksimović =

The Best Of Željko Joksimović

Greatest hits album by Željko Joksimović
- Released: 2003
- Label: City Records
- Producer: Željko Joksimović

Željko Joksimović chronology
111 (2002)	The Best Of Željko Joksimović (2003)	Ima nešto u tom što me nećeš (2005)

The Best Of Željko Joksimović is a 2003 compilation by the pop singer and songwriter Željko Joksimović. The compilation contains his top charted songs from the previous three studio albums: Amajlija, Vreteno and 111. The compilation was released in most of the countries from the former Yugoslavia.

== Track listing ==
1. "Šta će meni više od toga"
2. "7 godina"
3. "Vreteno"
4. "Karavan"
5. "Amajlija"
6. "Drska ženo plava"
7. "Gadura"
8. "Nema tebi doveka"
9. "Varnice"
10. "Petak na subotu"
11. "9 dana"
12. "Samo ti"
13. "Tanana"
14. "Ko da ne postojim"
15. "Dukati"
16. "Habanera"
17. "Balada"
18. "Zaboravljaš"

== Release history ==
Country	Date	Language
Bosnia and Herzegovina	2004	Serbian
Croatia	2004	Serbian
Macedonia	2004	Serbian
Serbia and Montenegro	2004	Serbian
