= Nikola Sarić (singer) =

- Also known as: Sajko
- Born: Nikola Sarić; 21 February 1989 (age 37); Belgrade, Serbia
- Genres: Rock, pop rock
- Occupations: Singer, songwriter, musician, television personality
- Instruments: Vocals, guitar, bass guitar
- Years active: 2008–present
- Label: Melody Music/Universal Music Group
- Formerly of: OT

Nikola "Sajko" Sarić (Serbian Cyrillic: Никола Сарић; born 21 February 1989) is a Serbian singer, musician and television personality. He came to media attention as one of sixteen contestants on the B92's Operacija trijumf, the Balkan version of Endemol's Fame Academy. As one of four members of OT Band, he took part in Beovizija 2009, with the song "Blagoslov za kraj", but they placed second in the final.

== Personal life ==
Sarić broke up with a girl named Nevena. He has accomplished the Elementary and the High Musical School in Belgrade; he admires musicians such as David Coverdale, Dado Topić, Gibonni, and Vlado Georgiev.

== Career ==
=== Operacija trijumf ===
The Operacija trijumf, started broadcasting on September 29, 2008. Nikola Sarić became very popular between the girls, and he was named "the favorite contestant of the girls". However, he was expelled at the eleventh gala event, losing to Vukašin Brajić. Sarić performed with the expelled students Đorđe Gogov and Nikola Paunović at the semifinals event. They covered Billy Idol's hits "White Wedding" and "L.A. Woman".

During the Operacija trijumf, Sarić performed the following songs:

- Let 3 – "Riječke pičke" with Let 3 (Gala 1)
- Bajaga i Instruktori/Van Gogh – "Zažmuri/Kiselina" with the student Vukašin Brajić (Gala 2)
- Slađana Milošević & Dado Topić – "Princeza" with the student Ana Bebić (Gala 3)
- Prljavo kazalište – "Marina" (Gala 4)
- Whitesnake – "Here I Go Again" (Gala 5)
- Osmi putnik/Psihomodo pop – "Da mi je biti morski pas"/"Ja volim samo sebe" with the student Vukašin Brajić (Gala 6)
- Dado Topić – "Da li znaš da te volim" with Dado Topić (Gala 7)
- Piloti – "Kada sanjamo" (Gala 8)
- Parni valjak – "Sve još miriše na nju" (Gala 9)
- Bijelo dugme – "Sanjao sam noćas da te nemam" (Gala 10)
- Bijelo dugme – "Došao sam da ti kažem da odlazim" (Gala 11)
- Azra – "Balkan" with the student Vukašin Brajić (Gala 11)
- Queen – "We Will Rock You"/"We Are the Champions" with the students Vukašin Brajić, Sonja Bakić, Danijel Pavlović and Ana Bebić (Gala 11)
- Billy Idol – "White Wedding"/"L.A. Woman" with the students Đorđe Gogov and Nikola Paunović (Semifinals, revival)

=== Present ===
After the end of the Operacija trijumf, the Emotion Production formed a band named "OT Band", consisting of four participants – Vukašin Brajić, Đorđe Gogov, Nikola Paunović and Nikola Sarić. The band took part in the Beovizija 2009, the Serbian national election for the Eurovision Song Contest 2009. Their song, named "Blagoslov za kraj", was written by E. Owen, S. Vukomanović and E. Botric, and was produced at the Universal Music Group. The band placed the 2nd, behind Marko Kon and his song "Cipela".

Sarić has recently recorded a rock ballad "Zaboravi" with Macedonian pop star Karolina Gočeva. The song was written by popular Serbian songwriters Mirko and Snežana Vukomanović. OT Band and the rest of Operacija trijumf contestants held two sold-out concerts at Belgrade's Sava Centar, on April 19 and 20, 2009.

== Discography ==
=== Albums ===
- 2009: Compilation of the Operacija trijumf contestants

=== OT Band singles ===
- 2009: "Blagoslov za kraj"
- 2009: "Strpi se jos malo"

=== Solo singles ===
- 2009: "Šta radiš sa njom (Dalje ruke od nje)" feat. Sky Wikluh
- 2010: "Dosta " feat. Mari Mari
- 2010: "Uhvati dan " feat. Miss Jukebox
