= Rođeni sa greškom =

Single by Ana Bebić featuring Milica Majstorović and Danijel Pavlović
- Released: 8 July 2009
- Recorded: 2009
- Genre: Pop music
- Length: 3:15
- Label: Melody Music
- Songwriter: Emina Jahović
- Producer: Bojan Dugić

Ana Bebić singles chronology
"Mrzim spore stvari" (2009)	"Rođeni sa greškom" (2009)

Milica Majstorović singles chronology
"Savršeni par" (2009)	"Rođeni sa greškom" (2009)

Danijel Pavlović singles chronology
"Javna tajna" (2009)	"Rođeni sa greškom" (2009)

"Rođeni sa greškom" (English: Born With a Mistake) is a pop song performed by singers Ana Bebić, Milica Majstorović and Danijel Pavlović. Bebić, Majstorović and Pavlović came to media prominence as the contestants of Operacija trijumf, and decided to take part in music festival Sunčane skale 2009 together with the song written by singer Emina Jahović.

== Song information ==
Croat Ana Bebić and Serbs Milica Majstorović and Danijel Pavlović came to media attention as the contestants of Operacija trijumf, regional version of Endemol's talents show Star Academy. They decided to take part in popular regional music festival Sunčane skale in Herceg Novi, Montenegro, after another Operacija trijumf contestant Nina Petković won the festival Pjesma Mediterana in Budva with the song "S druge strane sna". It was later announced that their song, "Rođeni sa greškom" would be written by popular singer Emina Jahović. Bebić, Majstorović and Pavlović recorded the song in Istanbul, in the studio of Jahović's husband, music producer and composer Mustafa Sandal. The song was produced and arranged by Bojan Dugić. The song is written in Croatian.

== Sunčane skale ==
Bebić, Majstorović and Pavlović were placed into the final event of Sunčane skale immediately. Pavlović performed, although his leg was injured. Majstorović also had problems with headache, thus she was immediately transferred to hospital. "Rođeni sa greškom" placed the ninth in the finals with a total of 39 points.
