= Preživjet ću =

Single by Ana Bebić

from the album TBR
- Released: 5 January 2009
- Recorded: 2008
- Genre: Pop music
- Length: 3:20
- Label: Melody Music
- Songwriters: Filip Miletić, Miloš Roganović
- Producer: Mirko Vukomanović

Ana Bebić singles chronology
"Preživjet ću" (2009)	"Mrzim spore stvari" (2009)

"Preživjet ću" (English translation: I Will Survive) is a pop song by the Croatian singer Ana Bebić, released as her debut single on 5 January 2009. Bebić came to media prominence as a semifinalist of talents show Operacija trijumf.

== Song information ==
"Preživjet ću" was written by popular Serbian composing duo Filip Miletić and Miloš Roganović for one of the contestants of talents show Operacija trijumf. It was meant to be recorded by Aleksandar Belov, but it was then given to Ana Bebić after she was heard singing it in the show (although it was rumoured after Bebić started a relationship with songwriter Filip Miletić). The song was recorded by Bebić in December 2008, and performed and released on 5 January 2009, the final of Operacija trijumf. Miletić and Roganović eventually decided to write and produce the whole album of Bebić.

== Promotion ==
Ana Bebić performed "Preživjet ću" at the final event of Operacija trijumf, on 5 January 2009 — the audience knew each and every word of the lyrics. She also performed the song at both Operacija trijumf concerts held on 19 and 20 April 2009 at the Belgrade's Sava Centar, the Operacija trijumf at the Belgrade's club H2O on 30 April, and during the tour she was on with members of OT Band and several other Operacija Trijumf students, covering Montenegro and many cities across Serbia.

== Controversies ==
During the Operacija trijumf, Bebić recorded a song named "Preživeću" in Serbo-Croatian. When the song was premiered on 5 January 2009 in the Operacija trijumf final, Bebić was singing entirely in Serbian, and the song became an instant hit. However, her Croatian fans considered she, as a native Croatian, should sing in Croatian only; Bebić eventually announced that the whole song would be recorded in Croatian. Her Serbian fans were disappointed — the song did not sound the same in Croatian, especially the word "Ubica" (Serbian: Murderer), which was now "Ubojica" (Croatian: Murderer). The name of the song was also changed in Croatian, and is now known as "Preživjet ću".

There were also rumours that "Preživjet ću" is plagiarized from "Prinzesschen", the song of German singer LaFee; however they were denied by the song's songwriters Filip Miletić and Miloš Roganović. It was also rumoured that the song, which should be recorded by another Operacija trijumf contestant Aleksandar Belov, was given to Bebić due to her romance with Miletić.

== Chart positions ==
Chart	Peak position
Serbian B92 Singles Charrt	1
Macedonian Singles Chart	3
