= Sonja Bakić =

Serbian singer and songwriter

- Born: Sonja Bakić; 22 February 1984 (age 42); Sombor, SAP Vojvodina, SFR Yugoslavia
- Origin: Serbia
- Genres: Pop, Rock, Pop rock, R&B
- Occupations: Singer, songwriter, composer, television personality
- Instruments: Vocals, piano
- Years active: 2008—present
- Website: Official website

Sonja Bakić (Serbian Cyrillic: Соња Бакић; born 22 February 1984 in Sombor, Serbia, SFR Yugoslavia) is a Serbian singer and songwriter. She reached fame as a contestant in television show Operacija trijumf, which was broadcast in five countries (Serbia, Croatia, Macedonia, Bosnia and Herzegovina and Montenegro), and made Sonja a regional music superstar.

== Early life ==
Sonja Bakić was born on 22 February 1984 in the town of Sombor, located in the north of Serbia. At the age of seven, her parents enrolled her in a music school where she spent 8 years studying the theory of music and piano. When she started high school she became a member of Iuventus Cantat Youth Choir that in her time won various prizes all over Europe (Austria, Wales, Switzerland, Hungary, Italy) and South Korea and performed in London, Amiens, Zürich, Rome etc.).

== Career ==
=== Operacija trijumf ===
Sonja Bakić made her breakthrough in a regional reality show for music talents, Operacija trijumf, based on Endemol's Fame Academy. Operacija trijumf 2008 was one of the most watched programs in the region in 2008, in Serbia, Croatia, Montenegro, Bosnia and Herzegovina and Macedonia.

During the Operacija trijumf, Sonja performed with international music stars, such as Anastacia and Junior Jack, and with the regional stars such as Magazin, Jelena Rozga, Kaliopi and Colonia.

Sonja was a special guest in both semifinal and the final. At the semifinal event, she performed En Vogue song "Don't Let Go (Love)" with other expelled students Milica Majstorović and Antonija Besednik.

Performances on Operacija trijumf

During the Operacija trijumf, Sonja Bakić performed the following songs:

- Anastacia — "Left Outside Alone" with Anastacia herself (Gala 1)
- U2/Indexi — "One"/"Ti si mi bila u svemu naj,naj" with the student Ivana Nikodijević (Gala 2)
- Magazin — "Ginem" with Magazin (Gala 3)
- OneRepublic — "Apologize" with the student Vukašin Brajić (Gala 4)
- Negative — "Zbunjena" (Gala 5)
- En Vogue — "Free Your Mind" with the student Mirjana Kostić (Gala 6)
- Kaliopi — "Rođeni" with Kaliopi (Gala 7)
- Colonia — "Plamen od ljubavi" with Colonia (Gala 8)
- Jadranka Stojaković — "Sve smo mogli mi" (Gala 9)
- Jelena Rozga — "Ožiljak" (Gala 10)
- Pink — "So What" (Gala 10) with the students Nina Petković and Ana Bebić
- Grace Jones — "La Vie en Rose" (Gala 11)
- Queen — "We Will Rock You"/"We Are the Champions" with the students Vukašin Brajić, Nikola Sarić, Danijel Pavlović and Ana Bebić (Gala 11)
- Jamelia — "Beware of the Dog" (Gala 12)
- Negative — "Svet tuge" with the student Vukašin Brajić (Gala 12)
- Junior Jack — "Stupidisco" with Junior Jack (Gala 12)
- Rihanna/Soft Cell/Rihanna — "SOS"/"Tainted Love"/"Disturbia" with the students Nina Petković and Ana Bebić (Gala 12)
- En Vogue — "Don't Let Go (Love)" with the expelled students Milica Majstorović and Antonija Besednik (Semifinal, revival performance)

=== Solo career ===
Sonja's first solo performance after Operacija Trijumf was on the stage of Sava Centar in Belgrade, where she took part in Beovizija 2009, the national preselection for Serbia's representative at the Eurovision Song Contest 2009. She performed Ništa Novo, written by Mirko and Snežana Vukomanović. However, her song received in final 0 points from the jury, and only one point from the audience, and Sonja placed last. The song became her first single. Since then, she recorded Kiša, a duet with Nina Petković, written by Bojan Momčilović and Zoran Radonjić. In September 2009 she toured Serbia, performing in various clubs. In February 2010 she was featured on the Beatshakers' single 'Prisoner'. In autumn 2010 Sonja released the first single from her debut album, that is yet to come out, "Trazim te", co-written by Sonja herself. Special guest on this track is one of the most famous Balkan stars, singer Tony Cetinski.

== Biography ==
After completing high school in Sombor, Sonja tried getting into the Faculty of Dramatic Arts in Belgrade, aiming to become a movie director, but ends up studying Japanese language and literature. After two years, she decided to return to Sombor to pursue her musical career. Her band Chicks & Freaks was then formed. She also started studying English language and literature in Novi Sad, but after two years ends her studies to participate in Operacija Trijumf and eventually become famous.

== Personal life ==
Sonja got together with her guitarist from the band in 2006, and they've been together even since.

== Discography ==
=== Albums ===
- 2009: Operacija Trijumf Maxi Single, compilation of the Operacija trijumf contestants
- TBD: Upcoming debut album

=== Singles ===
- 2009: "Ništa novo"
- 2009: "Kiša"(feat Nina Petkovic)
- 2010: Prisoner (feat The Beatshakers)
- 2010: "Tražim te" (feat with Tony Cetinski)

== Television appearances ==
- 3K-Dur
- Neon City
- Operacija trijumf
