= Đorđe Gogov =

- Also known as: Đole
- Born: Đorđe Gogov; 5 September 1988 (age 37); Dimitrovgrad, Serbia
- Genres: Rock, pop rock
- Occupations: Singer, musician, television personality
- Instrument: Vocals
- Years active: 2008—present
- Label: Melody Music/Universal Music Group

Đorđe Gogov (Serbian Cyrillic: Ђорђе Гогов; born 5 September 1988, in Dimitrovgrad, Serbia) is a Serbian singer, musician, and television personality. He came to media attention as one of sixteen contestants on the B92's Operacija trijumf, Balkan version of Endemol's Fame Academy. As one of four members of OT Band, he took part in Beovizija 2009, with the song "Blagoslov za kraj", and the band placed 2nd in the final.

== Personal life ==
Đorđe Gogov is a former professional high jumper, but had to give up of athletic career because he had no conditions for trainings. He was the first Serbian at the age of 14 to jump over 200 cm, with a 201 cm jump. Gogov admires artists such as Ivana Peters, Negative, Dado Topić, Gibonni, Lenny Kravitz, and Glen Hughes. He finds himself in a song "Eye of the Tiger".

== Career ==
=== Operacija trijumf ===
The Operacija trijumf, Balkan version of Endemol's Fame Academy, started broadcasting on 29 September 2008. Đorđe Gogov was gained great popularity, and was among the favourites for the win. However, he was expelled at the ninth gala event, losing to Vukašin Brajić; everyone was surprised, Brajić perhaps the most. Gogov performed with the expelled students Nikola Sarić and Nikola Paunović at the semi-finals event. They covered Billy Idol's hits "White Wedding", "Rebel Yell" and "L.A. Woman".

During the Operacija trijumf, Gogov performed the following songs:

- (Serbia) Električni orgazam – "Ja ne postojim" with the student Ivan (did not enter) (Gala 1)
- (Bosnia and Herzegovina) Laka – "Džemper" with Laka (Gala 2)
- (Serbia) Oliver Mandić – "Nije za nju" (Gala 3)
- (Canada) Bryan Adams – "Summer of '69" (Gala 4)
- (United States) Guns N' Roses – "Paradise City" (Gala 5)
- (Croatia) Azra – "A šta da radim" with the student Nikola Paunović (Gala 6)
- (Croatia) Dino Dvornik – "Ti si mi u mislima" (Gala 7)
- (Bosnia and Herzegovina) Divlje jagode – "Motori" with Divlje jagode (Gala 8)
- (United Kingdom) Deep Purple – "Soldier of Fortune" (Gala 9)
- (United States) Lenny Kravitz – "Are You Gonna Go My Way" with the student Vukašin Brajić (Gala 9)
- (United Kingdom) Billy Idol – "White Wedding" / "Rebel Yell"/"L.A. Woman with the students Nikola Paunović and Nikola Sarić (Semi-finals, revival)

=== Present ===
After the end of the Operacija trijumf, the Emotion Production formed a band named "OT Band", consisting of four participants – Vukašin Brajić, Đorđe Gogov, Nikola Paunović and Nikola Sarić. The band took part in the Beovizija 2009, the Serbian national election for the Eurovision Song Contest 2009. Their song, named "Blagoslov za kraj", was written by E. Owen, S. Vukomanović and E. Botric, and was produced at the Universal Music Group. The band placed the 2nd, behind Marko Kon and his song "Cipela". OT Band and the rest of Operacija trijumf contestants held two sold-out concerts at Belgrade's Sava Centar, on 19 and 20 April 2009.

== Discography ==
=== Albums ===
- 2009: Compilation of the Operacija trijumf contestants

=== OT Band singles ===
- 2009: "Blagoslov za kraj" (feat. Kaya)
- 2009: "Strpi se još malo" (cover of Take That's "Patience")
- 2009: "Zaboravi" (feat Karolina Goceva)
- 2013: "TBA"

=== Solo singles ===
- 2008:"Ovu noc"
