= Adnan Babajić =

- Born: Adnan Babajić; 28 May 1988 (age 38); Živinice, SR Bosnia and Herzegovina, Yugoslavia
- Genres: Pop, Pop folk, pop rock
- Occupations: Singer, television personality
- Instruments: Vocals, piano, drums, accordion
- Years active: 2008–present
- Label: Universal Music Group/Melody Music

Adnan Babajić (born 28 May 1988) is a Bosnian singer and television personality, who came to media attention as the winner of talents show Operacija trijumf, and thus signed a recording contract for an album for foreign market with Universal Music Group.

== Life and career ==
=== Early life and career (1988–2008) ===
Babajić was born and raised in Živinice into a Bosniak family. Before taking part in Operacija trijumf, he appeared in many musical show on television. Babajić plays piano, drums and accordion, and cites Bryan Adams and Željko Joksimović as his idols.

=== Operacija trijumf (2008–09) ===
The regional reality show for music talents Operacija trijumf began on 29 September 2009 on the B92. As one of only two contestants from Bosnia and Herzegovina, along with early expelled Jasmina Midžić, Babajić was one of the favourites. He was once nominated, after performing "Viva Las Vegas" by Elvis Presley", but beat Milica Majstorović in voting. Babajić won the competition beating Vukašin Brajić in the final and earned a recording contract with Universal Music Group, although his win was controversial. He was criticized for performing folk songs, which is characteristic for folk music talents show Zvezde Granda.

- (Bosnia and Herzegovina) Plavi orkestar — "Ako su to samo bile laži" with student Jasmina Midžić (Gala 1)
- (Bosnia and Herzegovina) Laka — "Pokušaj" with Laka (Gala 2)
- (Bosnia and Herzegovina) Bijelo Dugme — "Tako ti je, mala moja, kad ljubi Bosanac" with student Aleksandar Belov (Gala 3)
- (Bosnia and Herzegovina) Željko Samardžić — "9000" with Željko Samardžić (Gala 4)
- (Bosnia and Herzegovina) Zabranjeno pušenje — "Bos ili hadžija" with student Nikola Paunović (Gala 5)
- (Bosnia and Herzegovina) Bijelo Dugme — "Pristao sam, biću sve što hoće" (Gala 6)
- (United States) Elvis Presley — "Viva Las Vegas" (Gala 7)
- (Montenegro) Bojan Marović — "Tebi je lako" (Gala 8)
- (Montenegro) Bojan Marović — "Više te nema" with Bojan Marović (Gala 9)
- (North Macedonia) Toše Proeski — "Pratim te" (Gala 10)
- (Bosnia and Herzegovina) Bijelo Dugme — "Ima neka tajna veza" with student Aleksandar Belov (Gala 11)
- (Croatia) Petar Grašo — "Vera od suvog zlata" with Petar Grašo (Gala 11)
- (Serbia) Vlado Georgiev — "Živim da te nađem" (Gala 12)
- (Croatia) Đavoli — "Stojim na kantunu" / "Sunčan dan" with student Danijel Pavlović (Gala 12)
- (North Macedonia) Leb i sol — "Skopje" with student Aleksandar Belov (Gala 13)
- (Bosnia and Herzegovina) Dino Merlin — "Moj je život Švicarska" (Gala 13)
- (Croatia) Gibonni — "Tempera" (Semi-final)
- (Serbia) YU grupa — "Dunavom još šibaju vetrovi" with YU grupa (Semi-final)
- (Bosnia and Herzegovina) Al Dino — "Kopriva" (Final)
- (North Macedonia) Toše Proeski — "Pratim te" (Final)
- (Montenegro) Bojan Marović — "Tebi je lako" (Final)

=== Upcoming solo album (2009–present) ===
Babajić began recording his album for Universal Music Group. He performed on several concerts with other Operacija trijumf contestants, including three concerts in Sava Centar in Belgrade. Babajić then recorded a single "Srce plače" with Serbian singer Kaya.

== Discography ==
=== Albums ===
- 2010: Upcoming compilation of Operacija trijumf contestants
- 2010: Upcoming solo album

=== Singles ===
- 2009: "Srce plače" (feat. Kaja Ostojić)
- 2010: "Ne prođe ni jedan dan"
