= Vreteno =

Vreteno Rintam

Studio album by Željko Joksimović
- Released: 1 June 2001
- Recorded: 31 May 2001
- Genre: Pop
- Label: City Records
- Producer: Željko Joksimović

Željko Joksimović chronology
| Amajlija (1999) | Vreteno; Rintam (2001) | 111 (2002) |

Singles from Vreteno
- 1. "Vreteno" Released: 2000; 2. "Rintam" Released: 2001; 3. "Zaboravljaš" Released: 2001; 4. "Šta Će Meni Više Od Toga" Released: 2001

Vreteno (Serbian: Вретено) or Rintam (Serbian: Ринтам) is the second studio album by Serbian singer-songwriter Željko Joksimović. It was released in 2001 by City Records in Serbia and Montenegro and most countries from Yugoslavia.

== Track listing ==
Vreteno
| No. | Title | Writer(s) | Length |
|---|---|---|---|
| 1. | "Rintam (Ринтам)" | Željko Joksimović | 3:16 |
| 2. | "Nema tebi doveka (Нема теби довека)" | Željko Joksimović | 2:48 |
| 3. | "Gadura (Гадура)" | Željko Joksimović | 3:24 |
| 4. | "Dukati (Дукати)" | Željko Joksimović | 3:22 |
| 5. | "Petak na subotu (Петак на суботу)" | Željko Joksimović | 3:22 |
| 6. | "Kosa nečešljana (Коса нечешљана)" | Željko Joksimović | 3:03 |
| 7. | "Balada (Балада)" | Željko Joksimović | 3:25 |
| 8. | "Vreteno (Вретено)" | Željko Joksimović | 2:56 |
| 9. | "Šta će meni više od toga (Шта ће мени више од тога)" | Željko Joksimović | 4:19 |

== Release history ==
| Country | Date | Language |
|---|---|---|
| Bosnia and Herzegovina | 1 June 2001 | Serbian |
| Croatia | 1 June 2001 | Serbian |
| Macedonia | 1 June 2001 | Serbian |
| Serbia and Montenegro | 1 June 2001 | Serbian |
