= OT (band) =

Serbian pop/rock band

- Origin: Belgrade, Serbia
- Genres: Rock, pop rock
- Years active: 2009–2010, 2012–present
- Label: Melody/Universal
- Members: Vukašin Brajić; Đorđe Gogov; Nikola Paunović; Nikola Sarić (2009–2010)

OT is a Serbian pop/rock band founded in Belgrade in 2009. It was formed by four contestants of Operacija trijumf, the Balkan version of Endemol's Fame Academy. The contestants Vukašin Brajić, Đorđe Gogov, Nikola Paunović and Nikola Sarić are commonly known as the OT Rockers, due to their affirmation to the rock music.

The band took part in the Beovizija 2009, Serbia's national selection for the Eurovision Song Contest 2009, with a song "Blagoslov za kraj", written and produced by Universal Music, and won 2nd place.

== History ==
=== Operacija trijumf ===
Operacija trijumf, the Balkan version of Fame Academy, began on 29 September 2008. The contestants include young singers from all the countries of former SFR Yugoslavia (except Slovenia) — Serbia, Croatia, Bosnia and Herzegovina, Montenegro and Macedonia. Four of sixteen contestants were Vukašin Brajić, Đorđe Gogov, Nikola Paunović and Nikola Sarić. All of them are from Serbia; Brajić was born in Bosnia and Herzegovina, but has lived in Serbia since his childhood.

During the show, Brajić, Gogov, Paunović and Sarić were recognized as rock musicians, and they were named the OT Rockers. The singing professor Mirko Vukomanović, and a famous Serbian music producer, told that Brajić and Sarić are very good guitarists, the best at the academy. Gogov and Paunović do not play any instruments, but were noticed by their rock music affirmation and good performing. They performed merely rock songs, originally played by famous rock artists, such as Nirvana, Queen, Billy Idol, Lenny Kravitz, Bijelo Dugme, Deep Purple, AC/DC, Bryan Adams, Bon Jovi and others. However, none of them won. Gogov was expelled at the ninth gala event, being beaten in telephone voting by Brajić. Paunović was expelled at the tenth gala event, losing to Croatian Ana Bebić. Sarić was expelled at the eleventh gala event, losing to Brajić. Brajić was the finalist of the show.

One of the OT jury members, Croatian musician Tonči Huljić, said he sees Brajić, Gogov, Paunović and Sarić in a rock band. However, none of the future band members thought that was a good idea, except Paunović, all of them wanted a solo career. After the ending of Operacija trijumf, almost all the contestants expressed a will to take part in the Eurovision Song Contest; Brajić, Gogov, Paunović and Sarić were finally united in a rock band, and confirmed they are taking part in the Beovizija 2009.

=== Present ===
In January 2009, the group was officially formed. In the band's interview for Blic magazine (published on 17 February 2009), Gogov said that, in the beginning, only Paunović was for the band, but that the rest of them soon changed their minds.

Their song, "Blagoslov za kraj", was written and produced by Universal Music. The band said, in their interview for Blic magazine (17 February 2009, issue), that they have become great friends and they are happy to be together in a band. Brajić said that the audience should not expect a boy band such as the Backstreet Boys, but a rock band.

The OT Band was an opening act at the concert of James Blunt in Belgrade

== Discography ==
=== Singles ===
- "Blagoslov za kraj" (2009)
- "Strpi se još malo" (2009)
- "Zaboravi" ft. Karolina Goceva (2009)
- "TBA" (2013)
