= Jovana Joksimović =

Serbian television presenter (born 1981)

- Јована Јоксимовић
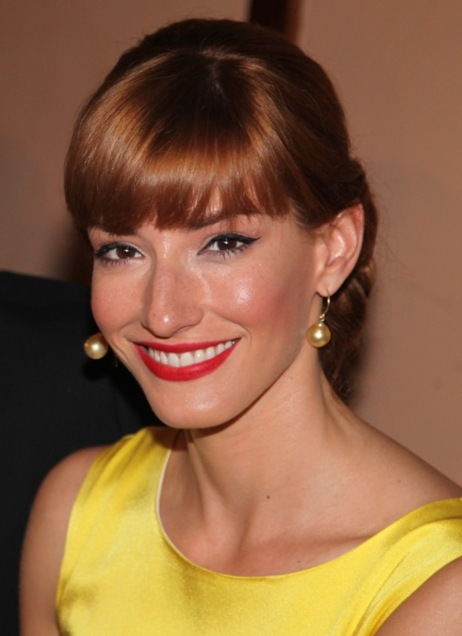
- Joksimović in 2012
- Born: Jovana Janković; 25 April 1981 (age 43); Belgrade, SR Serbia, Yugoslavia
- Occupation: Television presenter
- Years active: 2001–present
- Known for: Jutarnji program / Eurovision Song Contest 2008
- Spouse: Željko Joksimović (m. 2012)
- Children: 3

Jovana Joksimović (née Janković; Serbian Cyrillic: Јована Јоксимовић, née Јанковић; born 25 April 1981) is a Serbian television presenter, best known for hosting the morning TV show Jutarnji program. In May 2008, together with her, at that time soon to be, husband Željko Joksimović, she was the host of the 53rd edition of Eurovision Song Contest in Belgrade. She now hosts UranaK1 on K1 TV.

== Career ==
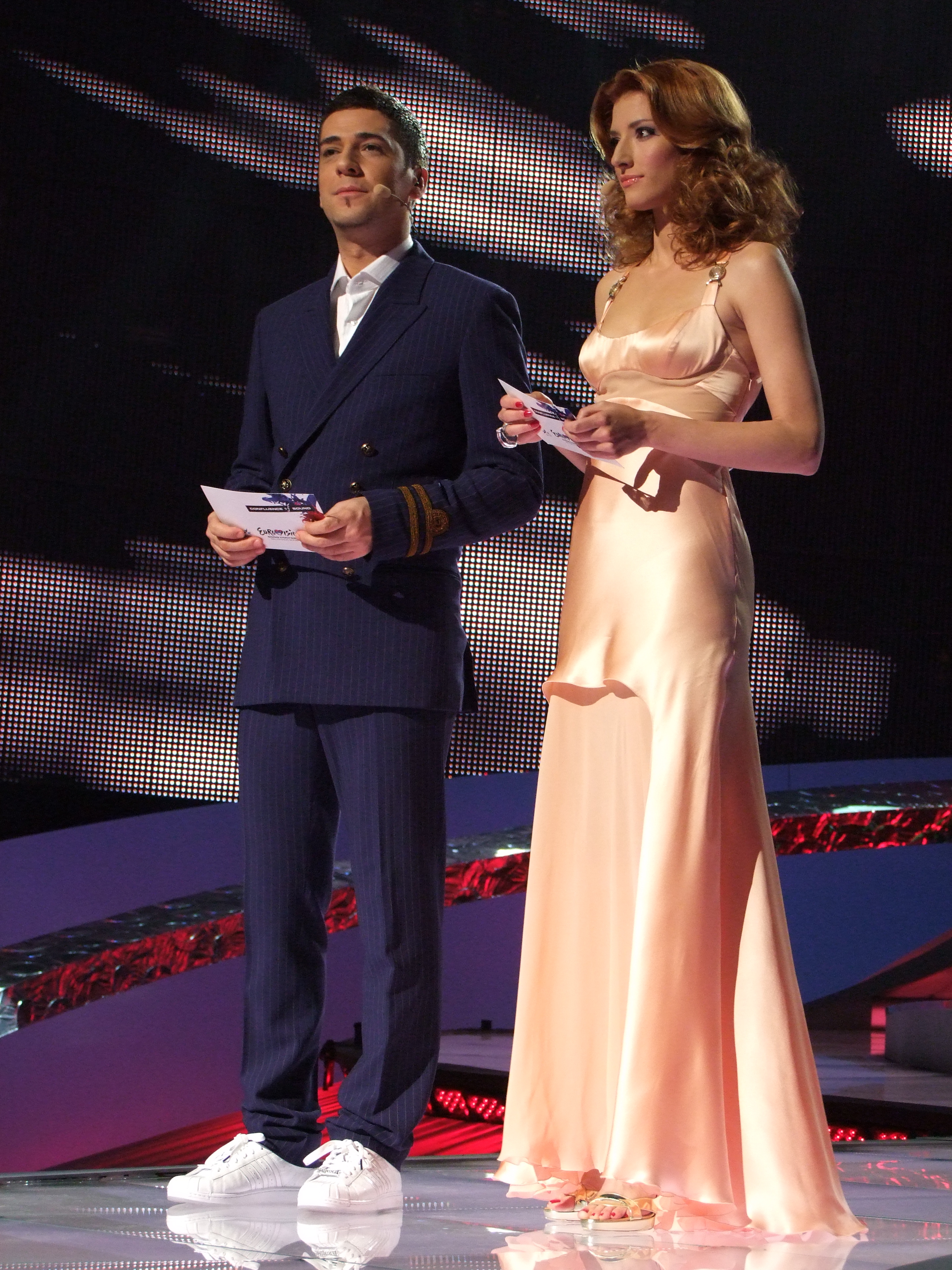
Janković with her (now) husband Željko Joksimović hosting the Eurovision Song Contest

Janković started her early television career at the age of 19 while attending university. She received a job offer at BKTV in 2001. Starting off as an entertainment reporter, she appeared on shows Blockbuster and Trailer both related to the world of cinema. Noticing her talents, Serbian state television general-director Aleksandar Tijanić made her an offer to move to the national broadcaster in 2005.

Once at RTS, she became the co-host of Jutarnji program (Morning Programme) airing weekdays from 6 am to 9 am. Since moving to RTS and the morning programme Jovana has gained a fan base of viewers and has appeared on the covers of Serbian tabloids and lifestyle magazines such as Cosmopolitan, Gloria, Svet and TV Revija. Her height is billed as 1.77 m.

Janković hosted the draw for the 2008 Eurovision Song Contest semi-finals in the Belgrade city hall. On 4 March 2008, it was announced that together with singer Željko Joksimović, Jovana would co-host the 2008 Eurovision Song Contest in Belgrade which was held from 20–24 May 2008 in the Belgrade Arena.

In March 2010, it was confirmed that Janković is leaving RTS. She co-hosted a morning show on the most popular privately owned Serbian network RTV Pink.

In 2018, she left RTV Pink to start a morning show on Prva Tv with Srđan Predojević.

In September 2020, the host duo left Prva Tv because they didn't agree with several corrections which are suggested by management of the television. The breakup of the agreement was a subject of several disputes. In December 2020, Joksimović has become the host of the morning show UranaK1 on the K1 TV, television whose owners are Jovana's spouse, Željko Joksimović and Manja Grčić. Grčić is also the host of the show UranaK1 alongside Jovana Joksimović.

== Personal life ==
In Serbia, Janković's love life has generated a lot of headlines.

In early 2008, following a five-year relationship, she got engaged to Aleksandar Zeremski (former editor at BKTV and her boss while she worked there). Then in May 2008, she co-hosted the ESC with Željko Joksimović who at the time was in a relationship with Adrijana Čortan, a TV presenter for Serbian Pink television.

However, a few months after Eurovision, it was reported that Željko and Jovana were seeing each other. In July it became public that Jovana had broken off her engagement and so did Željko. On 29 September 2008, the new couple made their first public appearance attending the Antonis Remos concert at Belgrade's Sava Centar.

In January 2012, Željko Joksimović and Jovana got married in the Maldives. In 2013 they announced that they were expecting their first child. On 10 April 2014, Jovana gave birth to their first son Kosta.

On 2 October 2017, she gave birth to twin girls Ana and Srna.

== See also ==
- List of Eurovision Song Contest presenters

Preceded by (Finland) Mikko Leppilampi & Jaana Pelkonen	Eurovision Song Contest presenter (with Željko Joksimović); 2008	Succeeded by (Russia) Semi-finals: Natalia Vodianova & Andrey Malahov (Russia) Final: Alsou & Ivan Urgant
