= Koncert Beogradska Arena =

Koncert Beogradska Arena Концерт Београдска Арена

Live album by Željko Joksimović
- Released: 13 February 2008
- Recorded: 20 April 2007
- Genre: Pop, folk
- Length: 105 minutes
- Label: Minacord
- Producer: Željko Joksimović

Željko Joksimović chronology
Platinum Collection (2007)	Koncert Beogradska Arena; Концерт Београдска Арена (2008)	Ljubavi (2009)

Koncert Beogradska Arena is the title of the first live album by pop singer-songwriter and producer – Željko Joksimović. The album consists of a DVD and CD which contains the footage shot from his concert held in the Belgrade Arena in April 2007. The CD contains the main theme from the TV series "Ono naše što nekad bejaše" and a gallery with Joksimović's newest photos as a bonus. It was released on 13 February 2008 by Minacord Records.

== Track listing ==
=== DVD ===
1. "Devojka"
2. "Zovi me"
3. "Mila moja"
4. "Michelle"
5. "Lutko moja"
6. "Pesma sirena"
7. "Nije do mene"
8. "Istina"
9. "Crnokosa"
10. "Drska ženo plava"
11. "Lane moje"
12. "Leđa o leđa"
13. "Pokloni se i počni"
14. Paganini – "Caprice No. 24"
15. "Supermen"
16. Mix: "Varnice", "Karavan", "9 dana", "Najmoje"
17. "Habanera"
18. "Lud i ponosan"
19. "Milo za drago"
20. "Zaboravljaš"
21. Ima nešto u tom što me nećeš

=== CD ===
1. "Devojka"
2. "Zovi me"
3. "Mila moja"
4. "Michelle"
5. "Lutko moja"
6. "Nije do mene"
7. "Istina"
8. "Crnokosa"
9. "Drska ženo plava"
10. "Lane moje"
11. "Supermen"
12. "Varnice"
13. "Karavan"
14. "9 dana"
15. "Habanera"
16. "Lud i ponosan"
17. Milo za drago
18. Ima nešto u tom što me nećeš
19. Ono naše što nekad bejaše (bonus track)
