= Tamee Harrison =

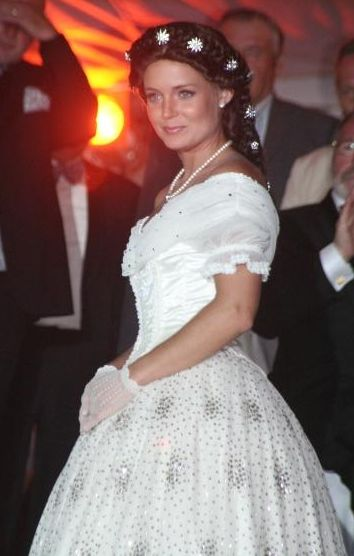
Tamee Harrison

Tamee Harrison (born 23 April 1979) is an Austrian singer

Born in Perth, Western Australia, at age 6 she moved to Vienna in Austria where she continued her schooling and also started to model and act in commercials and small TV roles.

In 1991 the family set up their main base in England where Harrison finished her secondary education, as well as singing and dance training. She signed with Sony Music Austria in 2000, and more recently with Warner Music Austria in 2003.

Her singles include A Little Bit (2001) and You're the Voice (2002), from her debut album, From Me to You. These were followed by Everytime we Touch, It’s a Fine Day, Going to Paris and Beautiful Time. In 2005 Harrison appeared as part of a duet on the song I Live my Life for You with Serbian singer-composer Željko Joksimović. She had two Top 20 songs in Austria in 2006, Heartbreaker and I’m Ready.

Harrison received Austrian Amadeus Music Award "Best Female Artist" nominations in 2002, 2004 and 2006.

In 2004 Harrison was chosen to be a host on MTV Austria and has also appeared as a host for shows such as "The Austrian Amadeus Music Award Show", "Dancing with the Stars", "MTV – SixPack", "The Vienna Opera Ball", and "Miami Winter Music Conference".
