= Milica Majstorović =

Serbian singer

- Born: Milica Majstorović; 9 October 1989 (age 36); Kragujevac, Serbia (then Yugoslavia)
- Genres: R&B, Pop, Dance, Pop rock
- Occupations: Singer, television personality
- Instruments: Vocals, piano, flute
- Years active: 2008—present
- Label: Melody Music

Milica Majstorović (Serbian: Милица Мајсторовић; born 9 October 1989) is a Serbian singer. She came to media attention as a contestant in regional television show Operacija Trijumf, while her debut single "Savršeni par" was released on 6 January 2009. On 20 February 2010, it was reported Majstorović tried to commit suicide due to professional disappointments, which she confirmed on 2 March 2010.

== Life and career ==
=== Early life and career: 1989–2008 ===
Milica Majstorović was born on 9 October 1989, in Kragujevac Serbia former SFR Yugoslavia. She has been playing the piano and the flute since she was ten, and won many international and Serbian musical competitions. Majstorović practiced swimming, winning more than thirteen regional and international medals, but dropped it due to musical career. She cites Anna Oxa, Ivana Peters, Negative, Aleksandra Radović and Vlado Georgijev as her favourite artists. She was also a cheerleader of the american football team Wild Boars from Kragujevac, and also took part in various theatre plays and regional beauty pageants. In July 2008, Majstorović recorded the song "Kad plaču zidovi" with rap group Legionari.

=== Operacija Trijumf: 2008–2009 ===
Majstorović made her breakthrough in a regional talents show Operacija Trijumf, based on Endemol's Fame Academy. Operacija Trijumf was one of the most watched programs in the region in 2008, in Serbia, Croatia, Montenegro, Bosnia and Herzegovina and Macedonia, even in Slovenia. Majstorović was recognized as a sex symbol, however she stated that was not her style. She was also romantically linked with Sky Wikluh, who was one–time professor at the Operacija Trijumf academy. However, they both denied love. Majstorović said that she would like to work with him just professionally.

Milica Majstorović was expelled on 17 November, and she was nominated with Adnan Babajić, the eventual winner of the competition, earning 25.4% votes. On her last gala event, she performed "Donna Con Te", one of the greatest hits of one of her favourite singers, Anna Oxa. The same evening, the jury confirmed they would start working on her solo album "in three days". Majstorović was a special guest in both semi-final and the final, performing En Vogue song "Don't Let Go (Love)" with other expelled students Sonja Bakić and Antonija Besednik at the semi-final, and her first solo single, "Savršeni par", at the final event, held on 6 January 2009.

During the Operacija trijumf, Milica Majstorović performed the following songs:

- Anastacia — "Heavy on My Heart"/"Sick & Tired"/"I'm Outta Love" with the students Nina Petković and Ana Bebić (Gala 1)
- Toše Proeski — "Čija si" with the student Aleksandar Belov (Gala 2)
- Madonna" — "Hung Up" (Gala 3)
- ABBA — "Mamma Mia" with the student Nina Petković (Gala 4)
- Boris Novković and Severina — "Ko je kriv" with the expelled student Ivana Nikodijević (Gala 5)
- Denis&Denis — "Soba 23" with Marina Perazić (Gala 6)
- Karolina Gočeva — "Kad voliš" (Gala 7)
- Anna Oxa — "Donna Con Te" (Gala 8)
- En Vogue — "Don't Let Go (Love)" with the expelled students Sonja Bakić and Antonija Besednik (Semi-final, revival performance)

=== Festivals and personal struggles: 2009–2010 ===
The first single of Majstorović, "Savršeni par", premiered on 6 January 2009, when the final event of Operacija Trijumf was held. The song was written by Marko Kon, and has become a big hit. In February 2009, Majstorović broke up her relationship with swimmer Ivan Lenđer, which had been previously confirmed on 25 December 2008. Meanwhile, it was confirmed she would take part in with her Operacija Trijumf fellow Danijel Pavlović at the Beovizija 2009. Although it was confirmed their song would be named "Alkatraz", the songwriter Marina Tucaković switched the song for "H8ER". They placed the eight at the final event with total of seven points.

Majstorović then continued with her work on her musical career, performing with her Operacija Trijumf contestants in Serbia and Montenegro. It was also announced on 8 June 2009 that she would take part in Sunčane Skale festival in Herceg Novi, alongside her Operacija Trijumf colleagues Danijel Pavlović and Ana Bebić with the song "Rođeni sa greškom", written by Emina Jahović. The song was released on the internet on 27 June 2009. The final night of the festival was held on 8 July 2009, and the trio placed the eight with 39 points. In August 2008, Majstorović recorded the English version of her single "Savršeni par", earning comparisons with Rihanna. It was also announced she would sign a recording contract with Universal Music. In September 2009, it was announced Bebić and Majstorović would make cameo appearances in upcoming television series Žene sa Dedinja.

On 20 February 2010, it was reported Majstorović tried to commit suicide using sleeping pills. On 2 March 2010, she confirmed the reports, explaining she did it due to professional disappointments and she was recovering with the help of her boyfriend. Soon after, Majstorović announced she was working on her studio album independently from the Emotion Production. On 5 April 2010, it was reported she lost consciousness after taking too much antidepressants, and her boyfriend had taken care of her recovery. On 27 April, it was confirmed that Majstorović and her boyfriend Nenad Jevremović engaged and they would marry on 25 August 2010. However, in August, Majstorović confirmed they had broken up and that they had been "too young for marriage".

=== Upcoming debut album: 2010–present ===
On 26 August 2010, Majstorović stated she was still working on her album and denied the rumours it would be released for the Grand Production. On 16 September, she performed in Štrpce, Kosovo, becoming the first Serbian artist to perform there since 1999. Later that year, in December, Majstorović released the single "Gubim te", a duet with the Big Brother winner Vladimir Arsić. From December 2010 to February 2011, Majstorović was the contestant of reality show Couples, along with her boyfriend Nenad Jevremović. During the show, it was rumoured her boyfriend physically abused her. However, her father Milorad denied the rumours. Majstorović shortly left the show so she could take part in the humanitarian fashion show, which raised money for the victims of the 2010 Serbia earthquake.

== Discography ==
=== Singles ===
- 2008: "Kad plaču zidovi" (feat. Legionari)
- 2009: "Savršeni par"
- 2009: "H8ER" (feat. Danijel Pavlović)
- 2009: "Rođeni sa greškom" (feat. Ana Bebić and Danijel Pavlović)
- 2009: "Svaka tvoja laž"
- 2010: "Gubim te" (feat. Vladimir Arsić)
- 2011: "Sebična lična"
