= Mrzim spore stvari =

Single by Ana Bebić

from the album TBR
- Released: 28 February 2009
- Recorded: 2009
- Genre: Dance-pop
- Length: 3:04
- Label: Melody Music
- Songwriters: Miro Buljan, Nenad Ničević
- Producer: Miro Buljan

Ana Bebić singles chronology
"Preživjet ću" (2009)	"Mrzim spore stvari" (2009)

"Mrzim spore stvari" (English translation: I hate slow things) is a pop song by the Croatian singer Ana Bebić, recorded for the Croatian selection for the Eurovision Song Contest 2009. It finished 12th in the national final with a total of 13 points.

== HRT Dora 2009 ==
Ana Bebić one of the Croatian contestants for the musical talent show Operacija trijumf, qualified automatically for the finals of the Croatian national selection, HRT Dora, for the Eurovision Song Contest 2009. Bebić entered with this song, "Mrzim spore stvari". The final event of Dora 2009 was held on 29 February 2009, wherein sixteen contestants took part; Bebić performed first. Her songs received only two points from the jury and 11 points from the votes, and finished the 12th with a total of 13 points.

== Composition ==
"Mrzim spore stvari" was written by Croatian composers Mira Buljan and Nenad Ničević. Ninčević described the song as "different", "modern", "rebellious" and "totally western".

== Chart positions ==
Chart	Peak position
Serbian Singles Chart	8

== See also ==
- Croatia in the Eurovision Song Contest
- Croatia in the Eurovision Song Contest 2009
- HRT Dora
