= Amajlija (album) =

Amajlija Željko Joksimović

Studio album by Željko Joksimović
- Released: 1 July 1999
- Recorded: August 1998 – June 1999
- Studio: Studio IQ (Belgrade)
- Genre: Pop
- Label: City Records
- Producer: Željko Joksimović

Željko Joksimović chronology
Svitanje (1996)	Amajlija; Željko Joksimović (1999)	Vreteno (2001)

Amajlija (Serbian: Амајлија) or Željko Joksimović (Serbian: Жељко Јоксимовић) is the debut studio album by Serbian singer and songwriter Željko Joksimović, released on 1 July 1999 through City Records.

== Track listing ==
1. "7 godina" (Željko Joksimović, Leontina) 2:41
2. "Amajlija" (Joksimović, Dragan Brajović) 3:25
3. "Habanera" (Joksimović, Svetlana Slavković) 4:44
4. "Pesma sirena" (Joksimović, Slavković) 4:10
5. "Samo ti" (Joksimović, Brajović) 3:28
6. "Ne dam nikom da te dira" (Joksimović, Dejan Ivanović) 3:32
7. "Još ne sviće rujna zora" (trad.) 4:51
8. "9 dana" (Leontina) 3:37

== Personnel ==
- Željko Joksimović: Vocals, Accordion, Keyboards, Programming, Percussion
- Leontina Vukomanović, Gordana Svilarević, Svetlana Palada, Svetlana Slavković, Romana Panić: Backing vocals
- Ivana Ćosić: Female Vocals on track 7
- Andrej Budimlić, Nebojša Zulfikarpašić – Keba: Guitars
- Branko Kljajić: Guitars, Tambura (Prim and alto)
- Vlada Baralić: Pipe
- Ivan Code: Keyboards, Drum and rhythm programming
