= Platinum Collection (Željko Joksimović album) =

Greatest hits album by Željko Joksimović
- Released: 18 April 2007
- Recorded: 1999–2007
- Genre: Pop, Pop-Folk
- Label: Minacord/City Records
- Producer: Željko Joksimović

Željko Joksimović chronology
Ima nešto u tom što me nećeš (2005)	Platinum Collection (2007)	Koncert Beogradska Arena (2007)

Singles from Platinum Collection
- 1. "Nije Do Mene" Released: 2007; 2. "Devojka" Released: 2007

Platinum Collection is the second greatest hits album by Serbian singer, songwriter and producer Željko Joksimović. The album was released on 18 April 2007 and contains 16 platinum hits from Joksimović's career plus two new songs: "Nije do mene" and "Devojka". The single "Devojka" charted very well, and got on the first place in most countries from the former Yugoslavia where this album was actually released. In the album is included the song "Lane moje" too. With this song Željko represented Serbia and Montenegro in the Eurovision Song Contest 2004 and finished on the 2nd place.

== Track listing ==
1. "Nije do mene" (Није до мене)
2. "Devojka" (Девојка)
3. "Lane moje" (Лане моје)
4. "Supermen" (feat. Dino Merlin) (Супермен)
5. "Leđa o leđa" (Леђa о леђа)
6. "Dukati" (Дукати)
7. "Najmoje" (Најмоје)
8. "Idi na put" (Иди на пут)
9. "Habanera" (Хабанера)
10. "Michelle" (Мишел)
11. "Lutko moja" (Лутко моја)
12. "Istina" (Истина)
13. "Pesma sirena" (Песма сирена)
14. "Balada" (Балада)
15. "Brate moj" (Брате мој)
16. "Zaboravljaš" (Заборављаш)
17. "Završna pesma" (Завршна песма)
18. "Ne dam nikom da te dira" (Не дам ником да те дира)

== Release history ==
Country	Date	Language
Bosnia and Herzegovina	18 April 2007	Serbian
Croatia	18 April 2007	Serbian
Montenegro	18 April 2007	Serbian
Macedonia	18 April 2007	Serbian
Serbia	18 April 2007	Serbian
