= Nikola Paunović =

Nikola Paunovic
- Born: Nikola Paunović; 25 July 1985 (age 41); Kragujevac, Serbia
- Genres: Pop rock
- Occupations: Singer, television personality
- Instrument: Vocals
- Years active: 2008—present
- Label: Melody Music/Universal Music Group

Nikola Paunović (Serbian Cyrillic: Никола Пауновић; born 25 July 1985, in Kragujevac, Serbia) is a Serbian singer and television personality. He came to media attention as one of sixteen contestants on the B92's Operacija trijumf, Balkan version of Endemol's Fame Academy and Spanish Operación Triunfo. As one of four members of OT Band, he took part in Beovizija 2009, Serbian selection for Eurovision 2009, with the song "Blagoslov za kraj", and the band placed second in the final.

== Discography ==
=== Solo singlovi ===
- 2010: "Nepozvan" – (Suncane skale in Herceg Novi, Montenegro)
- 2011: "Odlazim od tebe" (feat. Cvija)

=== OT Band singles ===
- 2009: "Blagoslov za kraj" (feat. Kaya)
- 2009: "Strpi se još malo" (cover of Take That's Patience)
- 2009: "Zaboravi" (feat. Karolina Goceva)
