= Željko Joksimović =

Serbian singer-songwriter (born 1972)

- Жељко Јоксимовић
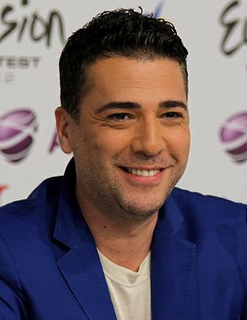
- Joksimović in 2012
- Born: 20 April 1972 (age 54); Belgrade, SR Serbia, SFR Yugoslavia
- Occupations: Singer-songwriter; composer; instrumentalist
- Years active: 1997–present
- Spouse: Jovana Janković (m. 2012)
- Children: 4
- Musical career
- Genres: Pop-folk; Balkan ballad
- Instruments: Vocal; accordion; piano; guitar; drums
- Labels: City; Minacord; Grand Production

Željko Joksimović (Serbian Cyrillic: Жељко Јоксимовић, pronounced [ʒěːʎko jǒksimovitɕ]; born 20 April 1972) is a Serbian singer-songwriter, composer, multi-instrumentalist and producer. He plays 12 different musical instruments including accordion, piano, guitar and drums.

Joksimović has been successful composing for other artists throughout the Balkans. He has written five ballads that have represented their respective countries at the Eurovision Song Contest: "Lane moje", "Lejla", "Oro", "Nije ljubav stvar" and "Adio". He also composes music for films, television series, and theater shows. He represented Serbia and Montenegro in the Eurovision Song Contest 2004 with the song "Lane moje", placing second. He also represented Serbia in the Eurovision Song Contest 2012 with the song "Nije ljubav stvar", placing third.

From 2013 to 2015, he was a judge on X Factor Adria, the Western Balkan edition of The X Factor. From 20 September 2014 to 1 November 2014, he was a judge on Zvezde Granda.

== Career ==
=== Early beginnings ===
Joksimović was born on 20 April 1972 in Belgrade and grew up in the city of Valjevo. His first international success came at the age of 12 when he won the title of First Accordion of Europe at the prestigious music festival in Paris. He graduated music at the University of Belgrade and launched his professional music career in 1997. In 1998, Joksimović won a contest at the Pjesma Mediterana festival with the song "Pesma Sirena", which led to opportunities to perform at more prestigious festivals in Belarus. He won the "Grand Prix" award at two festivals in that country.

=== 1999–2003: Amajlija, Rintam and 111 ===
Joksimović was promoted as a folk and pop artist. His first studio album, titled Amajlija, included "Pesma Sirena" along with seven other tracks. His first big success was with the single "7 godina", written by himself and Leontina Vukomanović. The song went on top of Serbian pop music charts and became popular in other former Yugoslav countries.

In 1999 he won his first big prize when becoming the Grand Prix winner of the International Festival of Arts Slavianski Bazaar in Vitebsk, Belarus.

=== 2004: Eurovision Song Contest 2004 ===
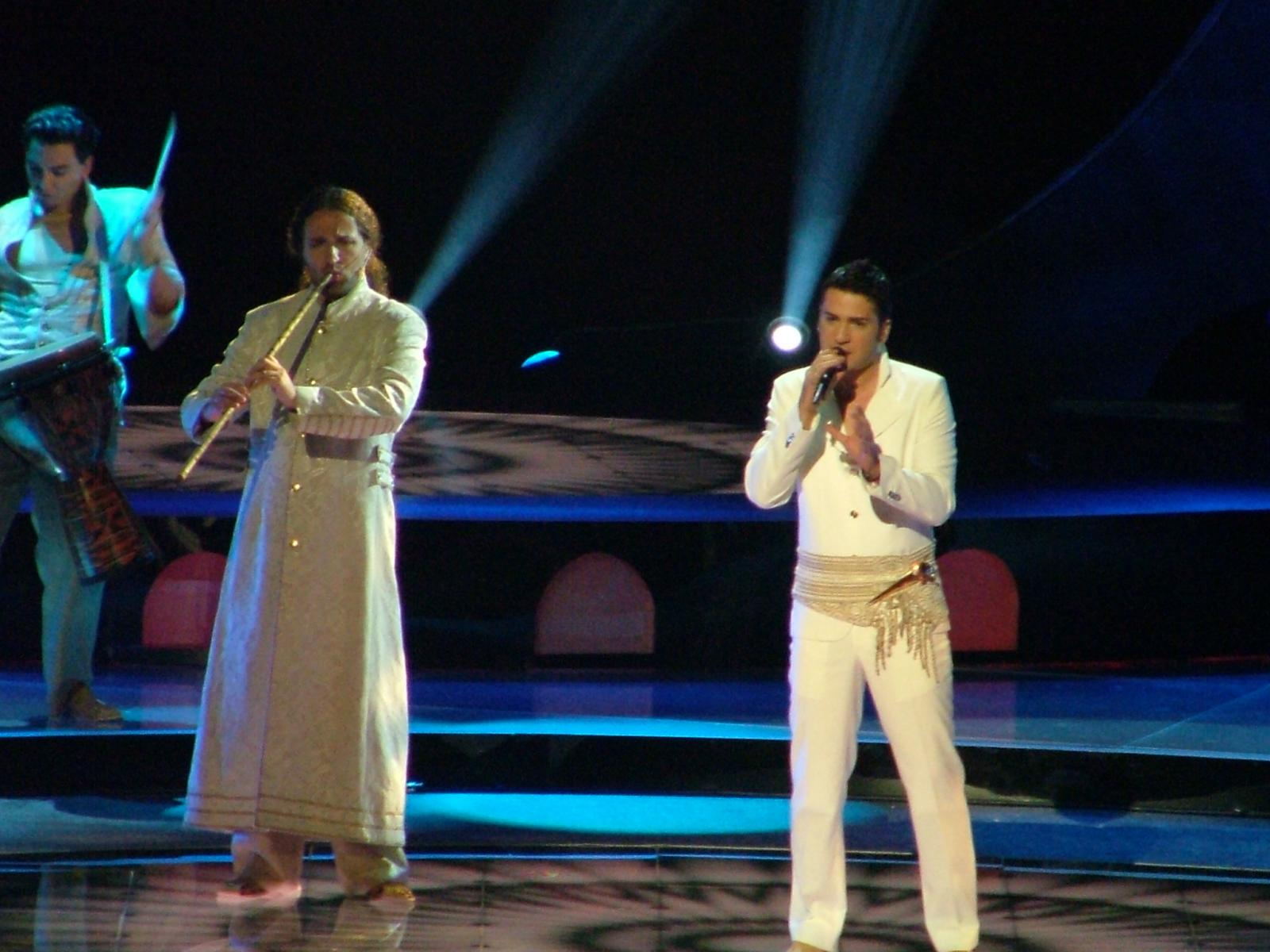
Joksimović performing "Lane Moje" for Serbia and Montenegro in ESC 2004. Istanbul, Turkey.

In 2004, his song, "Lane Moje" became popular amongst many Eurovision fans was often rated as one of the best non-winning songs.

=== 2008–2011: Eurovision hosting and Ljubavi ===
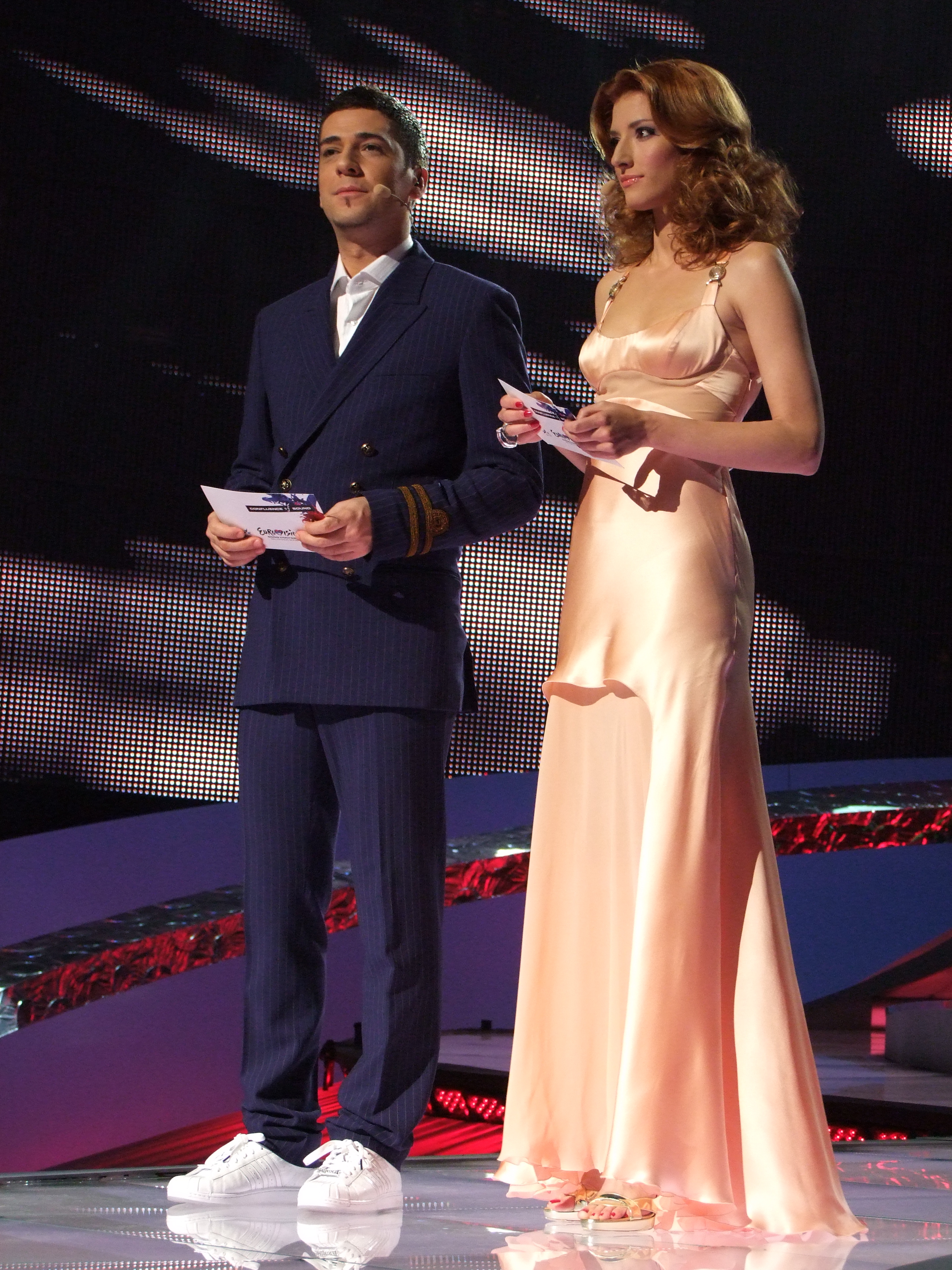
Željko Joksimović together with Jovana Janković during the first semi-final ESC Belgrade 2008.

In early 2008, Željko Joksimović composed a song that was performed by Jelena Tomašević in the Serbian national final for the Eurovision song selection, Beovizija 2008, titled "Oro". The song is a folk-ballad with traditional folk Serbian elements. Because the Eurovision Song Contest 2007 has been won by Serbia, the contest that year came in the country. On 24 March 2008, together with Jovana Janković, RTS announced that he hosted the Eurovision Song Contest 2008 in Belgrade, giving him two roles in the contest. Tomašević's song finished in the 6th place in over 25 countries in the final.

=== Later career ===
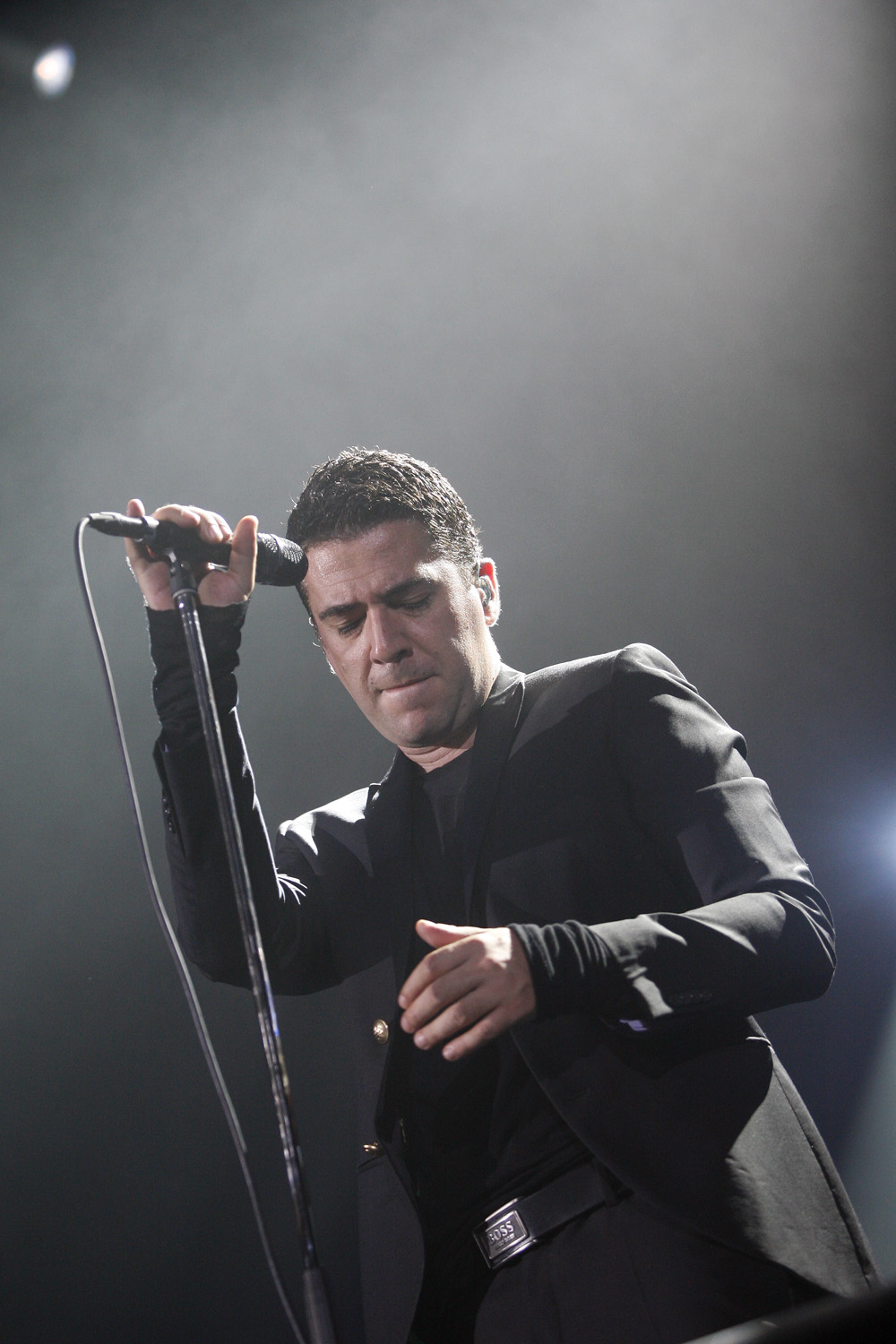
Željko Joksimović performing in Varaždin in January 2012

Joksimović was invited by RTCG to compose song for Knez who represented Montenegro in the Eurovision Song Contest 2015 in Vienna, Austria. He composed the song Adio, which has three versions in Serbian, French, and English. The Serbian lyrics were written by Marina Tucaković and Dejan Ivanović, whilst the English version was written by Swedish songwriters Nicole Rodriguez, Tami Rodriguez, as well as Serbs Milica Fajgelj and Dunja Vujadinović.

=== Recent concerts ===
In November 2018, Željko Joksimović had a concert in Arena Zenica – after eight-year break. He gave another concert entitled "Dva sveta" (lit. 'Two Worlds') in Sava Centar one month later..

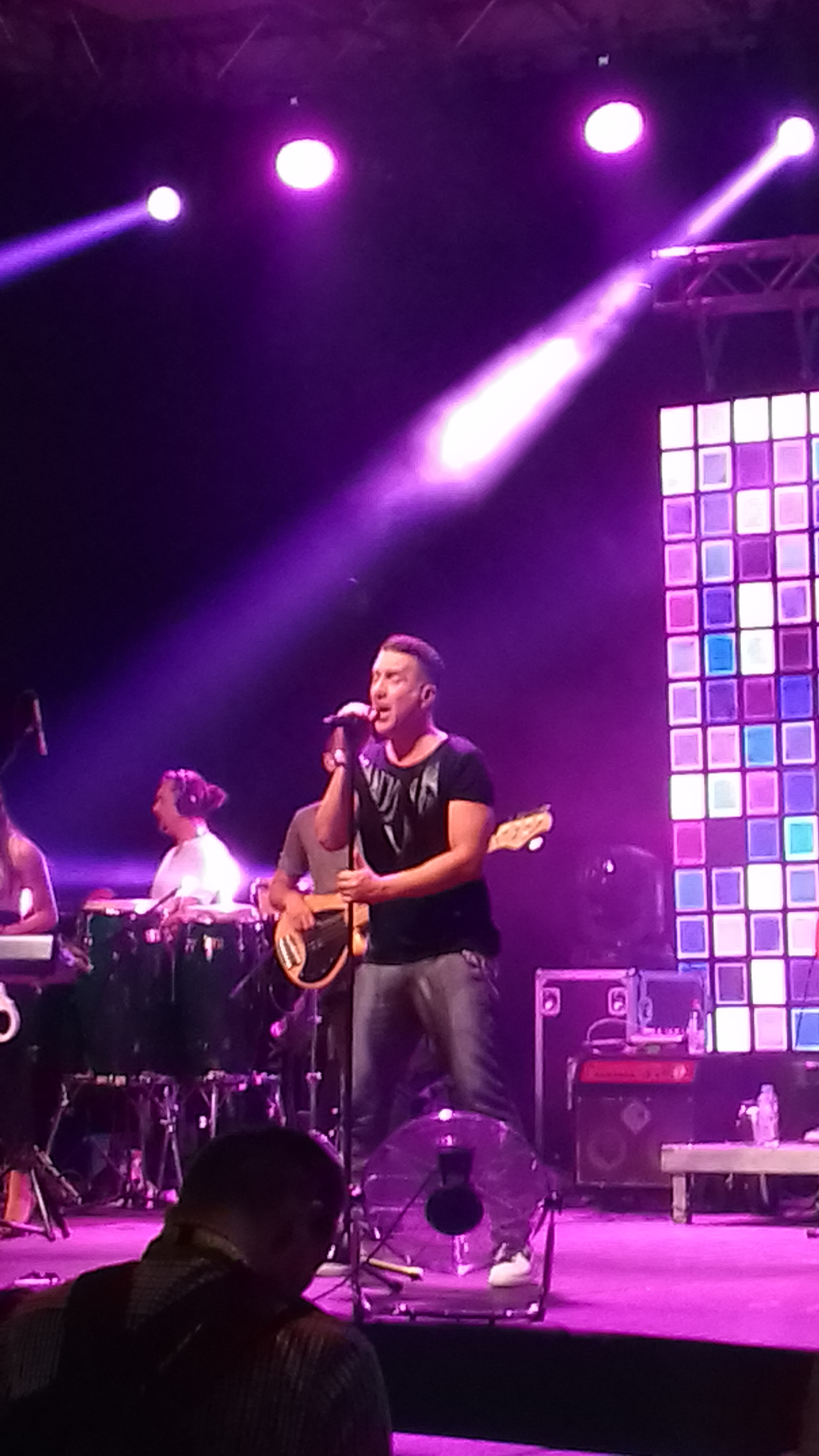
Joksimović on ZSF 2019 singing Milimetar (mosaic artwork in the background because of the lyrics)

On 9 August, Joksimović ended Zenica Summer Fest 2019 by free public two-hour performance on Zenica city square.

== Personal life ==
Joksimović is multilingual. Apart from Serbian, he is fluent in Greek, English, Russian, Polish, and French.

== Discography ==
=== Studio albums ===
- 1999: Amajlija (City Records)
- 2001: Vreteno (City Records)
- 2002: 111 (City Records)
- 2005: IV (City Records)
- 2009: Ljubavi (Minacord)
- 2015: Zvezda (Minacord, Grand Production)

=== Live albums ===
- 2008 Beogradska Arena Live (Minacord Records)
- 2017 Dva Sveta - Koncert Sava Centar (Live) [Minacord Records]

=== Compilations ===
- 2003: The Best Of Željko Joksimović
- 2007: Platinum Collection
- 2010: Ultimate Collection

=== Singles ===
- 2004: "Leđa o leđa" [City Records]
- 2004: "Lane moje" CD+DVD [PGP RTS]
- 2004: "Lane moje"/"Goodbye" (maxi-single) [Warner Music Group]
- 2005: "I Live My Live for You" (feat. Tamee Harrison) [Warner Music]
- 2007: "Devojka" [Minacord]
- 2007: "Nije do mene" [Minacord]
- 2008: "Ono naše što nekad bejaše" [Minacord]
- 2010: "Dođi sutra" [Minacord]
- 2012: "Nije ljubav stvar" [Minacord]
- 2013: "Ludak kao ja" [Minacord]
- 2015: "Ranjena zver" [Minacord]
- 2017: "Milimetar" [Minacord]
- 2018: "Ponelo me" [Minacord]
- 2018: "Menjaj pesmu" [Minacord]
- 2019: "Možda je to ljubav" [Minacord]
- 2024: "1000 žena" [Minacord]
- 2024: "Ella" [Minacord]
- 2024: "Ella" (Greek Version) [Minacord]

==== Collaboration singles ====
- 2001: "Šta će meni više od toga" (feat. Haris Džinović)
- 2004: "Supermen" (feat. Dino Merlin)
- 2005: "I Live My Life for You" (feat. Tamee Harrison)
- 2012: "Su amor me venció" (feat. Samuel Cuenda)
- 2009: "Libero" (feat. Miligram)
- 2014: "Skoplje (Beograd)" (feat. Daniel Kajmakoski)
- 2014: "Zabluda" (feat. Toni Cetinski)
- 2018: "Dva aviona" (feat. Emina Jahović)
- 2024: "Više Od Sreće" (feat. Ceca Ražnatović)
- 2025: "Ništavilo" (feat. Saša Matić)

=== Soundtracks ===
- 2005 "Ivkova slava" (feat. Jelena Tomašević and Nikola Kojo) [Minacord – City Records]
- 2009 "Ranjeni Orao" [Minacord – City Records]

=== Other works ===
Name	Artist	Year	Composer(s)	Album	Labels
"Cija Si"	Toše Proeski	2003	Željko Joksimović	Den Za Nas / Dan Za Nas	—
"Malah Shower"	Nava Medina	2005	Željko Joksimović	—	—
"Jutro"	Jelena Tomašević	2005	Željko Joksimović	Oro [PGP-RTS]	—
"Lejla"	Hari Mata Hari	2006	Željko Joksimović	Lejla [BiH]	—
"Oro"	Jelena Tomašević	2008	Željko Joksimović	Oro [PGP-RTS]	—
"To Telos mas Des"	Eleftheria Arvanitaki	2008	Željko Joksimović	Mirame	Universal Music
"Poso"	Melina Aslanidou	2008	Željko Joksimović	Best of (Sto dromo)	Sony BMG
"Nikola Tesla" (instrumental)	—	2008	Željko Joksimović	Balkan Routes Vol. 1: Nikola Tesla [Protasis]	—
"Miljacka"	Halid Bešlić	2009	Željko Joksimović	Halid 08 Bešlić	—
"Biber"	Lepa Brena	2011	Željko Joksimović	—	—
"Ne bih bila ja"	Lepa Brena	2011	Željko Joksimović	—	—
"Hotel Jugoslavija"	Saša Kapor	2013	Željko Joksimović	—	—
"Nema Srećnog Kraja"	Mirza Selimović	2014	Željko Joksimović	—	—
"Svedok"	Ivana Pavković	2014	Željko Joksimović	—	—
"Adio"	Knez	2014	Željko Joksimović	—	—

== Eurovision Song Contest entries ==
Country	Year	Song	Artist	Place	Points	Marcel Bezençon Awards
Serbia and Montenegro	2004	"Lane moje" (Лане моје)	Željko Joksimović & Ad-Hoc Orchestra	2	263	Press Award
Bosnia and Herzegovina	2006	"Lejla"	Hari Mata Hari	3	229	Composer Award
Serbia	2008	"Oro" (Оро)	Jelena Tomašević feat. Bora Dugić	6	160	
Serbia	2012	"Nije ljubav stvar" (Није љубав ствар)	Željko Joksimović	3	214	
Montenegro	2015	"Adio"	Knez	13	44	

=== Entries in Beovizija ===
- 2003 - "Čija si" (Чија си) by Toše Proeski - 1st
- 2004 - "Zamisli" (Замисли) by Leontina Vukomanović - 3rd
- 2005 - "Jutro" (Јутро) by Jelena Tomašević - 1st
- 2008 - "Oro" (Оро) by Jelena Tomašević - 1st

=== Entries in Evropesma / Europjesma ===
- 2004 - "Lane moje" (Лане моје) by Željko Joksimović - 1st
- 2004 - "Zamisli" (Замисли) by Leontina Vukomanović - 12th
- 2005 - "Jutro" (Јутро) by Jelena Tomašević - 2nd

== See also ==
- Music of Serbia
- Evropesma
- Serbia and Montenegro in the Eurovision Song Contest
- Serbia in the Eurovision Song Contest
- List of Eurovision Song Contest presenters
- Ima nešto u tom što me nećeš

Awards and achievements
Preceded by (Federal Republic of Yugoslavia) Extra Nena with Ljubim te pesmama	Serbia and Montenegro in the Eurovision Song Contest; 2004	Succeeded by No Name with Zauvijek moja
Preceded by (Finland) Mikko Leppilampi and Jaana Pelkonen	Eurovision Song Contest presenter (with Jovana Janković); 2008	Succeeded by (Russia) Semi-finals: Natalia Vodianova and Andrey Malahov (Russia) Final: Alsou and Ivan Urgant
Preceded by First title	Performer of The Best Song in Balkans; 2009	Succeeded by (Albania) Aurela Gaçe with Origjinale
Preceded by First title	Best Male Performer in the Balkans; 2009	Succeeded by (Turkey) Serdar Ortaç
Preceded by Nina with Čaroban	Serbia in the Eurovision Song Contest; 2012	Succeeded by Moje 3 with Ljubav je svuda
