= Vukašin Brajić =

Bosnian singer

Vukašin Brajić Вукашин Брајић
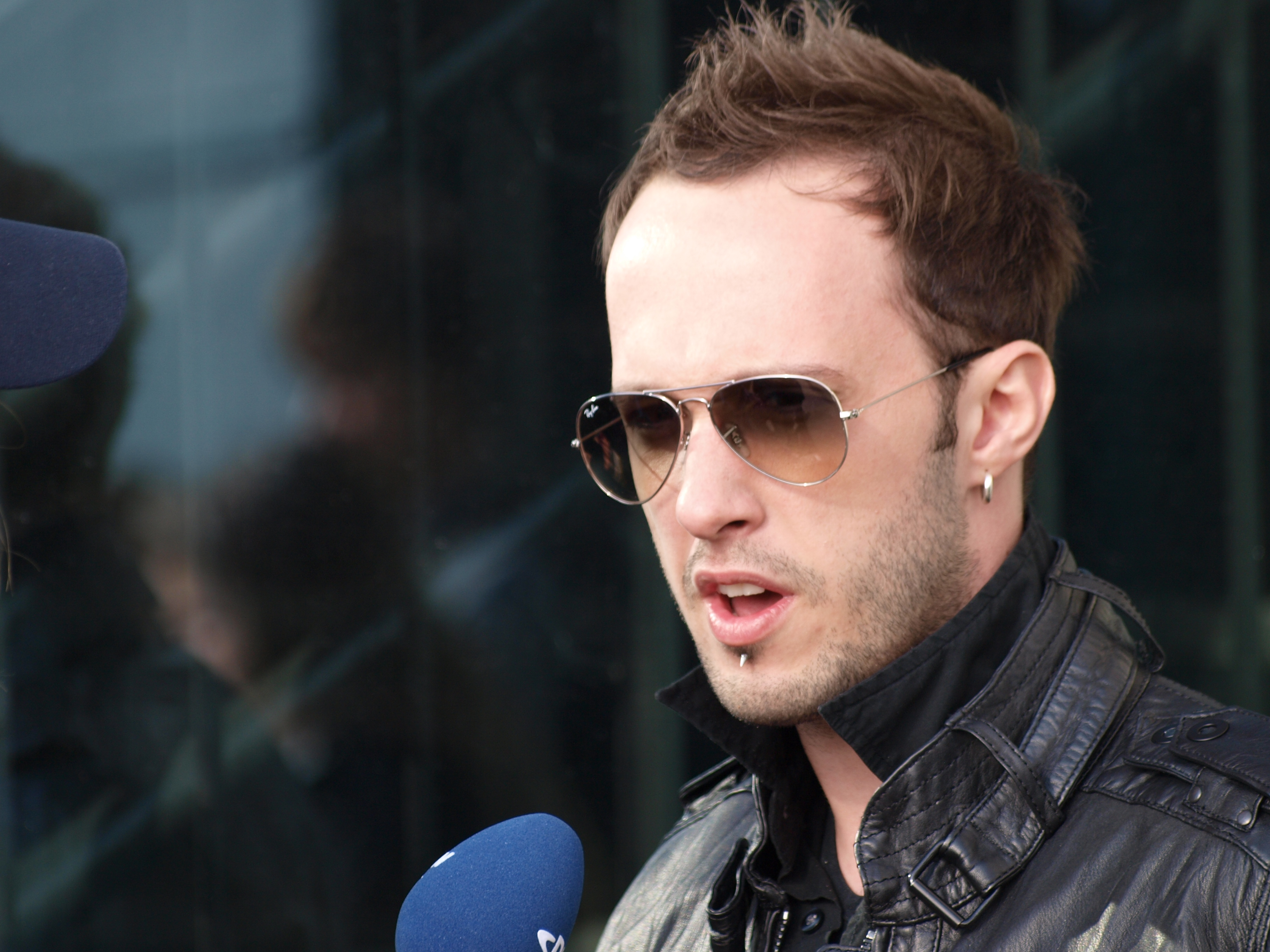

Background information
- Also known as: Wookee; The assassin
- Born: 9 February 1984 (age 42); Sanski Most, SR Bosnia and Herzegovina, SFR Yugoslavia
- Genres: Rock, hard rock, pop rock
- Occupations: Singer, teacher
- Instruments: Vocals, guitar, piano
- Years active: 2003–present
- Website: vukasinbrajic.com

Vukašin Brajić (Serbian Cyrillic: Вукашин Брајић; pronounced [ʋukǎʃin brǎːjitɕ]; born 9 February 1984) is a Bosnian and Serbian pop-rock singer who rose to fame after participating in the first season (2008–09) of Operacija trijumf, the ex-Yugoslav version of Star Academy, in which he came in second place.

He represented Bosnia and Herzegovina, the country of his birth, at Eurovision Song Contest 2010 in Oslo, Norway, with the song "Thunder and Lightning".

== Early life ==
Vukašin Brajić is the eldest of three children of Simo and Dušanka Brajić. He has a younger brother and sister, Nenad and Nevena. His interest in music started early, in the third grade, when he asked his parents to let him enroll in a music school, which was not possible in the time of war. In 1994, due to the Bosnian War, his family moved from Bosnia and Hercegovina to Serbia, to Mali Požarevac in Sopot, where they spent one year before moving to Čačak, where the Brajić family lives today. Vukašin finished both elementary and high school in Čačak. His music beginnings are also related to Čačak.

Although his parents could not afford his musical education, Vukašin studied by himself, learning from the books and Internet. He developed his keyboard and guitar skills through his self-study. He got his first guitar from his uncle before he turned 15 and then said to his family: "Someday, this guitar will feed all of you".

He also sang in the choir, danced in the dance studio "Luna" and was a member of a drama club, where he gained experience in public performances and contests. When he was 19 years old, he moved from Čačak to Negotin where he enrolled in the Teacher Education Academy for scene movement, music and singing.

== Affect ==
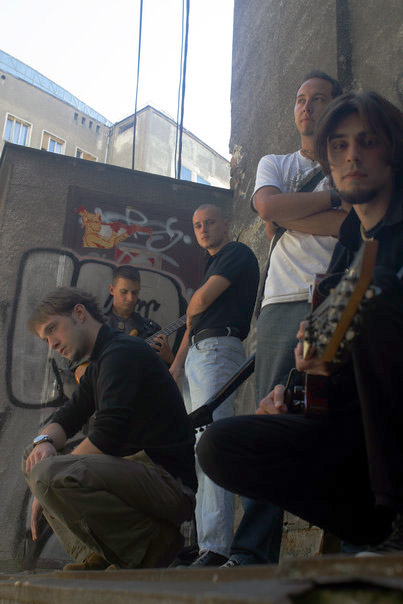
Affect

While he was on his third year of college, he moved from Negotin to Belgrade. Namely, in 2003 in Negotin, he met Darko Nikodijević and Nemanja Anđelković who recorded a few songs with a melodic metal-rock sound and decided to form a band, naming it "Affect". Since they did not have the lead vocal and, realizing that Vukašin is a good singer who loves music and plays the guitar, they asked him to join the band. In the summer of 2004, Vukašin recorded four songs with them. He liked the songs and quickly identified himself with them. In the early 2005, Affect was fully formed, after the bassist Nikola Dimitijević and the drummer Željko Despić joined the band. Due to the poor conditions, they worked on ten songs until the end of 2006. In the summer of 2006, they contacted Ognjen Uzelac, the director of "PGP-RTS" (label company), who offered to release Affect's promotional cd-single with two songs on it. In the fall of 2006, in studio 5 of PGP-RTS, they recorded two songs: "Read from my eyes" (in Serbian "Ništa više ne ostaje") and an instrumental cover of traditional Serbian song "Ajde Jano", which they played in heavy-metal style. In April 2007, they released promo-single in 150 copies. They performed live in Belgrade clubs where rock’n’roll was played, and with the help of "Beograd 202" radio, they also performed outside of Belgrade. For many reasons, one being that Vukašin was the only one who wanted to pursue professional music career, Affect was put on "stand by" in late 2007. However, Darko Nikodijević and Nemanja Anđelković would still work with Vukašin on future projects as parts of his team.

== Lucky Luke ==
After the Affect episode, Vukašin continued to perform with Marko Marić in an acoustic duo "Lucky Luke" (ex "Ausonia Duo"). The two of them played together until Vukašin entered Operacija Trijumf. They also had several TV appearances in morning shows and daily chronicles.

== Operacija Trijumf ==
Vukašin's Operacija Trijumf story began when his roommate from Negotin called and told him that the application process had begun, so his godfather Marko filled the application form. Vukašin, who was in Negotin at the time, dedicating himself to college, immediately started with preparations. He went back to Belgrade and spent all the money he earned from gigs on singing classes with Professor Tanja Andrejić, with whom he worked for three months. After passing the auditions, he did a few promotional concerts across Serbia during the summer with other Serbian contestants from the show.

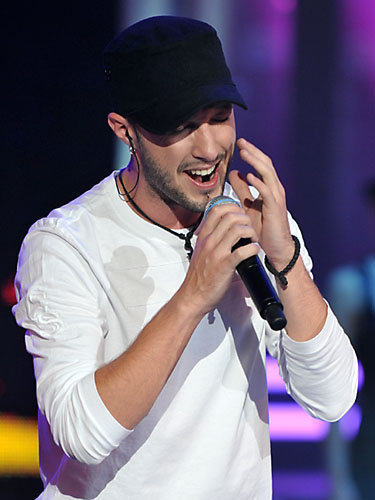
Vukašin Brajić – OT

The show started on 29 September 2008. At the first Gala Vukašin sang two songs alongside Ivana Nikodijević: "Kada padne noć" by Riblja Čorba and "Enter Sandman" by Metallica. He got his first nomination at the second Gala already, but did not get the explanation as to why he was nominated. He was then saved by the academy. At the eight Gala he got his first nomination after which he was left to the mercy of the audience and their votes. In a close "battle" with Đorđe Gogov, who was audience favorite more than once, Vukašin managed to go to the next round. On the same night, he performed "More Than Words" by Extreme, which remains as one of his best performances in which he showed his acoustic guitar skills. Later that night he performed "Are You Gonna Go My Way" by Lenny Kravitz alongside Đorđe Gogov. The series of nominations continued at the next Gala, and he was again dependent on the audience voting. At the 10th Gala he was nominated again, this time with Nikola Sarić. After the audience chose him over Nikola Sarić, who was also the audience favorite more than once, Vukašin earned a nickname "killer of the favorites". He ended the competition as the 1st runner up, behind the winner Adnan Babajić. Official statistic states that he received around 330 000 votes.

Vukašin stood out with many things during the show and got the support of the audience of all ages and from all the parts of the former Socialist Federal Republic of Yugoslavia. It was said that he was the man who reunited people from all the former republics. He is remembered by his excellent vocal and stage performances, which, as the jury evaluated, brought him the "highest average grade of all students". He is also remembered by his statement: "People who write on forums are the worst. And I am one of them!" which made him a favorite in the forum community.

== Performing and results ==
Gala#	Song	Performing	Original artist	Nomination/ result
1	Kada padne noć/Enter Sandman	duet with Ivana Nikodijević	(Serbia) Riblja Čorba / (United States) Metallica	safe
2	Zažmuri/Kiselina	duet with Nikola Sarić	(Serbia) Bajaga i Instruktori / (Serbia) Van Gogh	N (saved by the academy)
3	Supermen	duet with Igor Cukrov	(Bosnia and Herzegovina) Dino Merlin and (Serbia) Željko Joksimović	safe
4	Apologize	duet with Sonja Bakić	(United States) OneRepublic	safe
5	Kids	duet with Ana Bebić	(Australia) Kylie Minogue and (United Kingdom) Robbie Williams	safe
6	Da mi je biti morski pas/Ja volim samo sebe	duet with Nikola Sarić	(Croatia) Metak / (Croatia) Psihomodo Pop	N (all students)
7	Klatno	alone	(Serbia) Van Gogh	passed/ safe
8	Highway To Hell Himna OT (a capella version)	alone all students at 8th Gala	(Australia) AC/DC	N (with Đorđe Gogov)
9	More Than Words Are You Gonna Go My Way Himna OT (rock version)	alone duet with Đorđe Gogov all students at 9th Gala	(United States) Extreme (United States) Lenny Kravitz	passed/ safe
10	Kreni prema meni Help!/ A Hard Day's Night	alone all male students at 10th Gala	(Serbia) Partibrejkers (United Kingdom) The Beatles	N (with Nikola Sarić)
11	Smells Like Teen Spirit Balkan We Will Rock You We Are The Champions	alone duet with Nikola Sarić with A. Bebić, S. Bakić, N. Sarić and D. Pavlović	(United States) Nirvana (Croatia) Azra (United Kingdom) Queen	passed/ N (with Sonja Bakic)
12	Nothing Else Matters Svet tuge Mi plešemo/Maljčiki	alone duet with Sonja Bakić with Igor Cukrov and Ana Bebić	(United States) Metallica (Serbia) Negativ (Croatia) Prljavo Kazalište / (Serbia) Idoli	passed/ N (with Igor Cukrov)
13	Godine prolaze With or without you	alone duet with Igor Cukrov	(Croatia) Parni Valjak (Republic of Ireland) U2	passed
Semi-finals	Ugasi me Angels	duet with Aki Rahimovski alone	(Croatia) Parni Valjak (United Kingdom) Robbie Williams	entered the Finals as 2nd
Finals	Live And Let Die Easy More Than Words Highway To Hell	all finalists alone alone alone	(United States) Guns N' Roses (United States) Commodores (United States) Extreme (Australia) AC/DC	won 2nd place

== Post-OT career ==
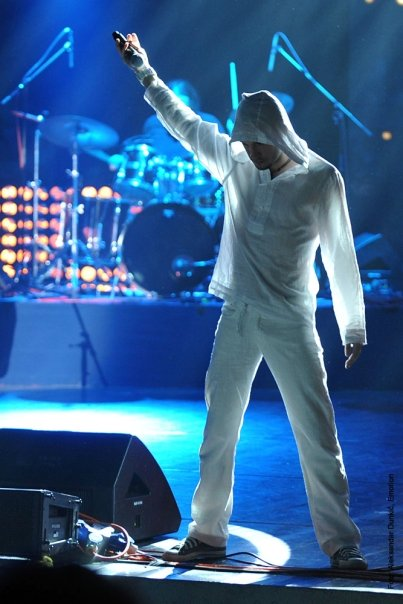
Vukašin Brajić – performing during the OT concert in Belgrade

After the OT, Vukašin became a member of "OT Bend" along with three more Operacija Trijumf participants (Nikola Paunović, Nikola Sarić and Đorđe Gogov).

On 23 February 2009, Vukašin, among the other members of "OT Bend" and Sonja Bakić, performed as an opening act to a world-famous music star James Blunt at his Belgrade concert.

"OT Bend" entered the "Beovizija 2009", Serbian Song Contest for the Eurovision Song Contest 2009 with the song "Blagoslov za Kraj", written by E.Owen, S. Vukomanovic and E. Botric. On 7 March, in the semi-finals, they won maximum 24 points and entered the finals as the 1st. Next day, in the finals, again they won maximum 12 points from the audience, with 28 521 votes of totally 53 550. That was still not enough for the victory, because this time, the jury gave them only 5 points, so they finished the contest as the 1st runner up.

On 19 and 20 April 2009, Vukašin, alongside other Operacija Trijumf participants, held two concerts in Sava Centar in Belgrade in front of 10000 people. He performed "OT Bend" songs and several national and international hits.

During the summer of 2009, first Operacija Trijumf contestants went on a Montenegro tour. High point of the tour was the concert in Podgorica in front of the full stadium called ("Stadion malih sportova").

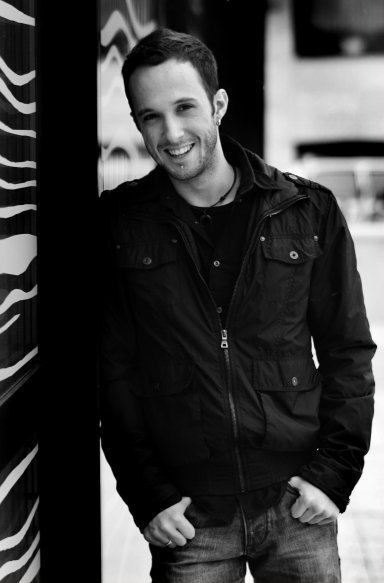
Vukašin Brajić – representative of Bosnia and Herzegovina at 2010 Eurosong

At the summer music festival "Sunčane skale 2009" in Herceg Novi, on the first night called "Prince awards" ("Prinčeve nagrade"), OT Bend won the "breakthrough of the year" award.

On 12 July 2009, in Belgrade Arena, OT Bend, alongside Ana Bebić, performed at the closing ceremony of the 25th Summer Universiade, which gathered 8200 participants from 145 countries in the capital city of Serbia.

Former students of Operacija Trijumf also held several concerts in cities across Serbia. One of the most noticed was the one of OT Bend and Ana Bebić at the main city square of Užice, in front of around 10000 people.

"Farewell concert of Operacija Trijumf" in Sava Centar, Belgrade, was left for the end of the year. That way, students had the opportunity to say goodbye to the group appearances under the name – Operacija Trijumf and marked the beginning of their own separate careers.

Artistic ensemble of Ministry of Defence "Stanislav Binički", under the conductor Vojkan Borisavljević, held a concert named "Mamma mia" in "Dom sindikata" in Belgrade, where they performed hits from the Swedish band ABBA. OT Bend, alongside Maja Odžaklijevska, Nada Pavlović, Tijana Dapčević, Jelena Jovičić, Milena Vasić, Dejan Lutkić and Marinko Madžgalj performed as vocal backup, under the sponsorship of Swedish Embassy in Serbia. Special guest was prima donna of Belgrade Opera, Jadranka Jovanović.

== Eurovision Song Contest ==
On 11 January 2010, announcement was made that Vukašin Brajić, with the song "Thunder and Lightning" by Edin-Dino Šaran, would represent Bosnia and Herzegovina at Eurovision Song Contest 2010 in Oslo, Norway. Bosnia and Herzegovina passed to the final of the contest and, among 25 countries which made it to the final, took 17th place.

== Singles ==
=== OT Band singles ===
- 2009: "Blagoslov za kraj"
- 2009: "Strpi se još malo"
- 2009: "Zaboravi" feat. Karolina Goceva
- 2013: "TBA"

=== Solo singles ===
- 2010: "Thunder and Lightning" / "Munja i grom"
- 2010: "Od svega umoran" feat. AlogiA
- 2013: "Mogli smo sve"
- 2014: "Na usnama"

Preceded by Regina with Bistra voda	Bosnia and Herzegovina in the Eurovision Song Contest; 2010	Succeeded by Dino Merlin with Love in Rewind
