= Ukraine in the Eurovision Song Contest 2011 =

- Eurovision Song Contest 2011
- Participating broadcaster: National Television Company of Ukraine (NTU)
- Country: Ukraine
- Selection process: Yevrobachennia 2011 – Natsionalnyi vidbir
- Selection date: 26 February 2011

Competing entry
- Song: "Angel"
- Artist: Mika Newton
- Songwriters: Ruslan Kvinta; Maryna Skomorohova

Placement
- Semi-final result: Qualified (6th, 81 points)
- Final result: 4th, 159 points

Participation chronology

Ukraine was represented at the Eurovision Song Contest 2011 with the song "Angel", written by Ruslan Kvinta and Maryna Skomorohova, and performed by Mika Newton. The Ukrainian participating broadcaster, National Television Company of Ukraine (NTU), organised a national final in order to select its entry for the contest. Thirty-five entries competed in the national selection which consisted of nine shows: five heats, three semi-finals and a final. Seventeen entries qualified to compete in the final, held on 26 February 2011, where "Angel" performed by Mika Newton was selected as the winner following the combination of votes from a nine-member jury panel, a public televote and an online vote. Following controversy regarding alleged voting miscalculations, a new final was planned to be held on 3 March 2011 with the top three entries of the initial final competing. The new final was later cancelled after the second and third placed acts both declined to participate, and "Angel" performed by Mika Newton ultimately remained as the Ukrainian entry.

Ukraine was drawn to compete in the second semi-final of the Eurovision Song Contest which took place on 12 May 2011. Performing during the show in position 6, "Angel" was announced among the top 10 entries of the second semi-final and therefore qualified to compete in the final on 14 May. It was later revealed that Ukraine placed sixth out of the 19 participating countries in the semi-final with 81 points. In the final, Ukraine performed in position 23 and placed fourth out of the 25 participating countries with 159 points.

== Background ==
Prior to the 2011 contest, Ukraine had participated in the Eurovision Song Contest eight times since its first entry in 2003, winning it in 2004 with the song "Wild Dances" performed by Ruslana. Following the introduction of semi-finals for the 2004, Ukraine had managed to qualify to final in every contest they participated in thus far. Ukraine had been the runner-up in the contest on two occasions: in 2007 with the song "Dancing Lasha Tumbai" performed by Verka Serduchka and in 2008 with the song "Shady Lady" performed by Ani Lorak. Ukraine's least successful result had been 19th place, which they achieved in 2005, with the song "Razom nas bahato" performed by GreenJolly.

The Ukrainian national broadcaster, National Television Company of Ukraine (NTU), broadcasts the event within Ukraine and organises the selection process for the nation's entry. NTU confirmed their intentions to participate at the 2011 Eurovision Song Contest on 9 July 2010. In the past, the broadcaster had alternated between both internal selections and national finals in order to select the Ukrainian entry. Between 2005 and 2010, NTU had set up national finals to choose both or either the song and performer to compete at Eurovision for Ukraine, with both the public and a panel of jury members involved in the selection. The method was continued to select the 2011 Ukrainian entry.

== Before Eurovision ==
=== Yevrobachennia 2011 – Natsionalnyi vidbir ===
The Ukrainian national final commenced on 31 October 2010 and concluded with a final on 26 February 2011. All shows in the competition were broadcast on Pershyi Natsionalnyi as well as online via NTU's official website 1tv.com.ua. The final was also broadcast online at the official Eurovision Song Contest website eurovision.tv.

==== Format ====
The selection of the competing entries for the national final and ultimately the Ukrainian Eurovision entry took place over four stages. In the first stage, artists and songwriters had the opportunity to apply for the competition by attending a scheduled audition during designated dates. Thirty-five acts were selected and announced on 22 August 2010. The second stage consisted of the televised heats which took place between 31 October and 28 November 2010 with six to seven acts competing in each show. Four acts qualified from each heat based on the votes from a public televote and an expert jury. The expert jury first selected the top three entries to advance, while the remaining entries faced a public vote held following their respective heats which selected an additional qualifier. The jury also selected four wildcard acts out of the remaining non-qualifying acts from the heats to proceed in the competition. The second stage consisted of the semi-finals which took place on 5, 12 and 26 December 2010 with eight acts competing in each show. Seven acts qualified from each semi-final by a public televote and an expert jury. The expert jury first selected the top five entries to advance, while the remaining three entries faced a public vote held following their respective heats which selected an additional two qualifiers. The fourth stage was the final, which took place on 26 February 2011 and featured the acts that qualified from the semi-finals vying to represent Ukraine in Düsseldorf. The winner was selected via the combination of votes from an online vote (10%), a public televote (45%) and an expert jury (45%). The online vote was held from 13 February 2011 and closed before the final, while viewers participating in the public televote during the live shows had the opportunity to submit their votes for the participating entries via SMS. In the event of a tie during the final, the tie was decided in favour of the entry that received the highest score from the jury.

==== Competing entries ====
Artists and composers had the opportunity to submit their entries between 5 July 2010 and 19 August 2010. Auditions were held between 19 and 21 August 2010 at the Olmeca Plage in Kyiv where a seven-member selection panel consisting of Walid Arfush (producer), Vlad Baginsky (music producer of NTU), Ruslana Pysanka (singer), Yuliya Magdych (fashion designer), Anton Tseslik (CEO of Kiss FM Ukraine), Igor Likhuta (composer and producer) and Kamaliya (singer) reviewed over 200 received submissions and shortlisted thirty-five entries to compete in the national final. On 22 August 2010, the thirty-five selected competing acts were announced. Among the competing artists was former Eurovision Song Contest contestants Verka Serduchka, who represented Ukraine in 2007 with the song "Dancing Lasha Tumbai", and Anastasia Prikhodko, who represented Russia in 2009 with the song "Mamo". On 14 October 2010, Verka Serduchka, who was to gain direct entry into the competition's final, withdrew from the national final due to scheduling issues and was replaced with the song "Shake Your Body" performed by Pavlo Tabakov.

Artist	Song	Songwriter(s)
A.R.M.I.YA and Vera Varlamova	"Allo, allo" (Алло, алло)	Roman Babenko
Anastasia Prikhodko	"Action"	Andrii Ignatchenko
Arina Domski	"Prosto lyubit'" (Просто любить)	Oleksandr Grinchenko, Ihor Dobrolezh
Bahroma	"Yeyo imya" (Єйо імя)	Roman Bakhariev
Dash	"Love Is"	Arkadii Nesterenko, Dmytro Seriakov
Dasha Medova	"Infinity"	Dasha Medova
Denys Povalii	"Aces High"	D. Seriakov, A. Korzhenko, A. Nesterenko, Denys Povalii
Eduard Romanyuta	"Berega" (Берега)	Bohdan Bolkhovetskyi, Volodymyr Tretiakov
El Kravchuk	"Moya nadezhda" (Моя надежда)	Semen Horov, Andriy Danylko
Inna Voronova	"Mr. Fever"	Inna Voronova
Ivan Berezovskyi	"Ave Maria"	Romano Mussumaro
Jamala	"Smile"	Jamala, Tetiana Skubashevska
Khrystyna Kim	"Victim of My Love"	Khrystyna Kim
Maksym Novytskyi	"True Love Can Free You"	Maksym Novytskyi, Brent Jordan
MetroPoly10	"Think It Over"	Maksym Dersky
Mika Newton	"Angel"	Ruslan Kvinta, Maryna Skomorohova
Mila Nitich	"Goodbye"	Gennadii Krupnik, Olha Stepura
Natalia Pugachova	"Hey Boy"	Natalia Pugachova
Nek$i	"Sever-Jug" (Север-Юг)	Gennadii Tatarchenko, Yurii Rybchynskyi
Oleksandr Kvarta	"Ne somnevaysya" (Не сомневайся)	Oleksandr Kvarta
Oleksii Matias	"Myself"	Gennadii Krupnik
Olena Kornieieva	"Why Didn't I Say Goodbye?"	Olena Kornieieva, Marianna Stasiuk
Para Normalnykh	"Gliadi" (Гляді)	Vitalii Pleshakov
Pavlo Tabakov	"Shake Your Body"	Petro Chernyshenko
Shanis	"Kamennyi tsvetok" (Каменный цветок)	Ruslan Kvinta, Diana Golde
Tetiana Vorzheva	"Vsyo resheno" (Всё решено)	Vlad Darvin
Vitalii Galai	"My Expression"	Vitalii Galai
Vladislav Levytskiyi	"Love"	Vladislav Levytskiyi, Sonia Sytnyk
Vroda	"Zhovteie zhyto" (Жовтеє жито)	Vasyl Tkach
Yakov Smirnov	"You'll Be With Me"	Yakov Smirnov
Zaklyopki	"Superhero (U-la-la)"	Serhii Kabanets, Katia Komar
Zhemchug	"Hero"	Anna Alisher, Aliona Zhemchug, Yevhenii Matiushenko
Zlata Ognevich	"The Kukushka"	Mykhailo Nekrasov, Yevhenii Matyushenko

==== Shows ====
===== Heats =====
The five heats took place between 31 October and 5 December 2010 at the Dovzhenko Studios in Kyiv, hosted by Tatyana Goncharova and Timur Miroshnychenko. In each heat an expert jury selected the top three entries to advance to the semi-finals of the competition, with the remaining entries then facing a public televote held in the week following the heat which determined an additional qualifier. Four wildcards were also awarded by the jury from the thirteen eliminated entries to advance to the semi-finals. The jury panel that voted during the heats consisted of Walid Arfush (producer), Kamaliya (singer), Ruslana Pysanka (singer), Anton Tseslik (CEO of Kiss FM Ukraine) and Iryna Zhuravska (model, winner of the Miss Ukraine 2008).

Heat 1 (first round) – 31 October 2010
R/O	Artist	Song	Result
1	Yakov Smirnov	"You'll Be With Me"	Second Round
2	Zaklyopki	"Superhero (U-la-la)"	Second Round
3	El Kravchuk	"Moya nadezhda"	Second Round
4	Khrystyna Kim	"Victim of My Love"	Advanced
5	Olena Kornieieva	"Why Didn't I Say Goodbye?"	Advanced
6	Inna Voronova	"Mr. Fever"	Second Round
7	Dasha Medova	"Infinity"	Advanced

Heat 1 (second round) – 31 October–7 November 2010
Artist	Song	Result
Yakov Smirnov	"You'll Be With Me"	—N/a
Zaklyopki	"Superhero (U-la-la)"	Advanced
El Kravchuk	"Moya nadezhda"	Wildcard
Inna Voronova	"Mr. Fever"	—N/a

Heat 2 (first round) – 7 November 2010
R/O	Artist	Song	Result
1	Para Normalnykh	"Gliadi"	Second Round
2	Eduard Romanyuta	"Berega"	Advanced
3	Ivan Berezovskyi	"Ave Maria"	Advanced
4	Bahroma	"Yeyo imya"	Advanced
5	MetroPoly10	"Think It Over"	Second Round
6	Nek$i	"Sever-Jug"	Second Round

Heat 2 (second round) – 7–14 November 2010
Artist	Song	Result
Para Normalnykh	"Gliadi"	Wildcard
MetroPoly10	"Think It Over"	—N/a
Nek$i	"Sever-Jug"	Advanced

Heat 3 (first round) – 14 November 2010
R/O	Artist	Song	Result
1	Arina Domski	"Prosto lyubit'"	Second Round
2	Vitalii Galai	"My Expression"	Second Round
3	Oleksii Matias	"Myself"	Advanced
4	Shanis	"Kamenniy tsvetok"	Advanced
5	Natalia Pugachova	"Hey Boy"	Second Round
6	Zhemchug	"Hero"	Advanced
7	A.R.M.I.YA and Vera Varlamova	"Allo, allo"	Second Round

Heat 3 (second round) – 14–21 November 2010
Artist	Song	Result
Arina Domski	"Prosto lyubit'"	—N/a
Vitalii Galai	"My Expression"	Advanced
Natalia Pugachova	"Hey Boy"	—N/a
A.R.M.I.YA and Vera Varlamova	"Allo, allo"	Wildcard

Heat 4 (first round) – 21 November 2010
R/O	Artist	Song	Result
1	Oleksandr Kvarta	"Ne somnevaysya"	Second Round
2	Vladislav Levytskyi	"Love"	Second Round
3	Dash	"Love Is"	Second Round
4	Zlata Ognevich	"The Kukushka"	Advanced
5	Anastasia Prikhodko	"Action"	Advanced
6	Mika Newton	"Angel"	Advanced
7	Mila Nitich	"Goodbye"	Second Round

Heat 4 (second round) – 21–28 November 2010
Artist	Song	Result
Oleksandr Kvarta	"Ne somnevaysya"	—N/a
Vladislav Levytskyi	"Love"	Wildcard
Dash	"Love Is"	—N/a
Mila Nitich	"Goodbye"	Advanced

Heat 5 (first round) – 28 November 2010
R/O	Artist	Song	Result
1	Pavlo Tabakov	"Shake Your Body"	Second Round
2	Jamala	"Smile"	Advanced
3	Denys Povalii	"Aces High"	Advanced
4	Maksym Novytskyi	"True Love Can Free You"	Second Round
5	Tetiana Vorzheva	"Vsyo resheno"	Advanced
6	Vroda	"Zhovteie zhyto"	Second Round

Heat 5 (second round) – 28 November–5 December 2010
Artist	Song	Result
Pavlo Tabakov	"Shake Your Body"	Advanced
Maksym Novytskyi	"True Love Can Free You"	—N/a
Vroda	"Zhovteie zhyto"	—N/a

===== Semi-finals =====
The three semi-finals took place between 5, 12 and 26 December 2010 at the Dovzhenko Studios in Kyiv, hosted by Tatyana Goncharova and Timur Miroshnychenko. In each semi-final an expert jury selected the top five entries to advance to the final of the competition. The remaining entries then faced a public televote held following the semi-final which determined an additional qualifier, while the remaining entry was eliminated. The jury panel that voted during the semi-finals consisted of Walid Arfush (producer), Kamaliya (singer), Ruslana Pysanka (singer), Anton Tseslik (CEO of Kiss FM Ukraine) and Iryna Zhuravska (model, winner of the Miss Ukraine 2008).

Semi-final 1 (first round) – 5 December 2010
R/O	Artist	Song	Result
1	Bahroma	"Yeyo imya"	Advanced
2	Zhemchug	"Hero"	Advanced
3	Vitalii Galai	"My Expression"	Advanced
4	Nek$i	"Sever-Jug"	Second Round
5	Zlata Ognevich	"The Kukushka"	Advanced
6	Para Normalnykh	"Gliadi"	Second Round
7	Tetiana Vorzheva	"Vsyo resheno"	Second Round
8	Vladislav Levytskyi	"Love"	Advanced

Semi-final 1 (second round) – 5–12 December 2010
Artist	Song	Televote	Place
Nek$i	"Sever-Jug"	72.52%	1
Para Normalnykh	"Gliadi"	9.46%	3
Tetiana Vorzheva	"Vsyo resheno"	18.02%	2

Semi-final 2 (first round) – 12 December 2010
R/O	Artist	Song	Result
1	Mika Newton	"Angel"	Advanced
2	Ivan Berezovskyi	"Ave Maria"	Second Round
3	Shanis	"Kamenniy tsvetok"	Advanced
4	Zaklyopki	"Superhero (U-la-la)"	Second Round
5	Olena Kornieieva	"Why Didn't I Say Goodbye?"	Advanced
6	Khrystyna Kim	"Victim of My Love"	Second Round
7	Denys Povalii	"Aces High"	Advanced
8	Anastasia Prikhodko	"Action"	Advanced

Semi-final 2 (second round) – 12–26 December 2010
Artist	Song	Televote	Place
Ivan Berezovskyi	"Ave Maria"	78.62%	1
Zaklyopki	"Superhero (U-la-la)"	11.32%	2
Khrystyna Kim	"Victim of My Love"	10.06%	3

Semi-final 3 (first round) – 26 December 2010
R/O	Artist	Song	Result
1	A.R.M.I.YA and Vera Varlamova	"Allo, allo"	Advanced
2	El Kravchuk	"Moya nadezhda"	Advanced
3	Jamala	"Smile"	Advanced
4	Eduard Romanyuta	"Berega"	Advanced
5	Mila Nitich	"Goodbye"	Second Round
6	Pavlo Tabakov	"Shake Your Body"	Second Round
7	Dasha Medova	"Infinity"	Advanced
—N/a	Oleksii Matias	"Myself"	Second Round

Semi-final 3 (second round) – 26 December 2010 – 2 January 2011
Artist	Song	Televote	Place
Mila Nitich	"Goodbye"	9.07%	2
Pavlo Tabakov	"Shake Your Body"	8.69%	3
Oleksii Matias	"Myself"	82.24%	1

===== Final =====
The final took place on 26 February 2011 at the Savik Shuster Studio in Kyiv, hosted by Savik Shuster, Gaitana, Irina Rosenfeld and Evgenia Vlasova with Timur Miroshnychenko, Olesya Batsman and Iryna Zhuravska as backstage hosts. A.R.M.I.YA and Vera Varlamova as well as Nek$i withdrew prior to the final, while Vitaliy Galay and Tanya Vorzheva were disqualified during the show due to using pre-recorded backing vocals and having over six performers on stage, respectively. The remaining seventeen entries that qualified from the semi-finals competed and the winner, "Angel" performed by Mika Newton, was selected through the combination of votes from a public televote, an online vote held between 13 and 26 February 2011, and an expert jury. The jury panel that voted during the final consisted of Ruslana (singer-songwriter, winner of the Eurovision Song Contest 2004 for Ukraine), Egor Benkendorf (President of NTU), Walid Arfush (producer), Hanna Herman (Deputy Head of Presidential Administration), Yan Tabachnyk (composer), Ani Lorak (singer-songwriter, represented Ukraine in 2008), Eduard Klim (producer), Yuriy Rybchynsky (poet) and Alyosha (singer-songwriter, represented Ukraine in 2010). 75,310 and 221,682 votes were registered by the televote during the show and by the online vote, respectively. In addition to the performances of the competing entries, 2003 Ukrainian Eurovision entrant Oleksandr Ponomariov performed as a guest.

Final – 26 February 2011
R/O	Artist	Song	Jury (45%)		Televote (45%)		Internet (10%)		Total	Place
R/O	Artist	Song	Votes	Points	Votes	Points	Votes	Points	Total	Place
1	Zlata Ognevich	"The Kukushka"	80	19	19,900	19	14,349	13	18.40	2
2	Dasha Medova	"Infinity"	—	13	2,980	16	32,587	16	14.65	4
3	Zhemchug	"Hero"	—	7	270	5	509	2	5.60	16
4	Bahroma	"Yeyo imya"	—	10	295	7	2,836	9	8.55	13
5	Oleksii Matias	"Myself"	—	11	2,539	15	24,924	15	13.20	6
6	Jamala	"Smile"	79	17	10,800	17	37,232	19	17.20	3
7	Mila Nitich	"Goodbye"	—	15	560	9	181	1	10.90	10
8	Olena Kornieieva	"Why Didn't I Say Goodbye?"	—	14	879	11	1,208	4	11.65	9
9	Denys Povalii	"Aces High"	—	9	286	6	2,498	8	7.55	14
10	El Kravchuk	"Moya nadezhda"	—	8	676	10	34,488	17	9.80	11
11	Shanis	"Kamenniy tsvetok"	—	8	91	1	3,184	10	5.05	17
12	~~Vitalii Galai~~	~~"My Expression"~~	—	—	~~122~~	~~2~~	~~3,378~~	~~11~~	—	—
13	Mika Newton	"Angel"	81	21	29,064	21	37,384	21	21.00	1
14	Eduard Romanyuta	"Berega"	—	13	2,472	13	5,902	12	12.90	7
15	~~Tetiana Vorzheva~~	~~"Vsyo resheno"~~	—	—	~~124~~	~~3~~	~~1,098~~	~~3~~	—	—
16	Ivan Berezovskyi	"Ave Maria"	—	16	2,502	14	1,289	5	14.00	5
17	Zaklyopki	"Superhero (U-la-la)"	—	10	181	4	2,320	7	7.00	15
18	Vladislav Levytskyi	"Love"	—	12	450	8	1,494	6	9.60	12
19	Anastasia Prikhodko	"Action"	—	12	1,119	12	14,821	14	12.20	8

==== Controversy and new final plans ====
Following Mika Newton's victory at the Ukrainian national final, jury member Hanna Herman petitioned for a re-evaluation of the result due to multiple votes being submitted from a single phone number causing votes to be miscounted. On 28 February, NTU announced that a new final featuring the top three acts in the initial final would take place on 3 March where only a single vote per phone number would be allowed during the show, however both Jamala and Zlata Ognevich declined to participate with the former claiming that votes would again be rigged and the latter having to take part in another television show that day. The broadcaster confirmed on 4 March that the new final had been cancelled, and that Mika Newton would remain as the Ukrainian representative for the 2011 contest.

=== Promotion ===
A revamped version of "Angel" was presented to the public on 15 March through the release of the official music video, directed by Alexander Ivanenko. Mika Newton specifically promote "Angel" as the Ukrainian Eurovision entry on 27 March by taking part in promotional activities in Armenia where she performed during the National Music Awards. A farewell concert for Newton took place on 24 April at the Independence Square in Kyiv, Ukraine where she performed during the event.

== At Eurovision ==
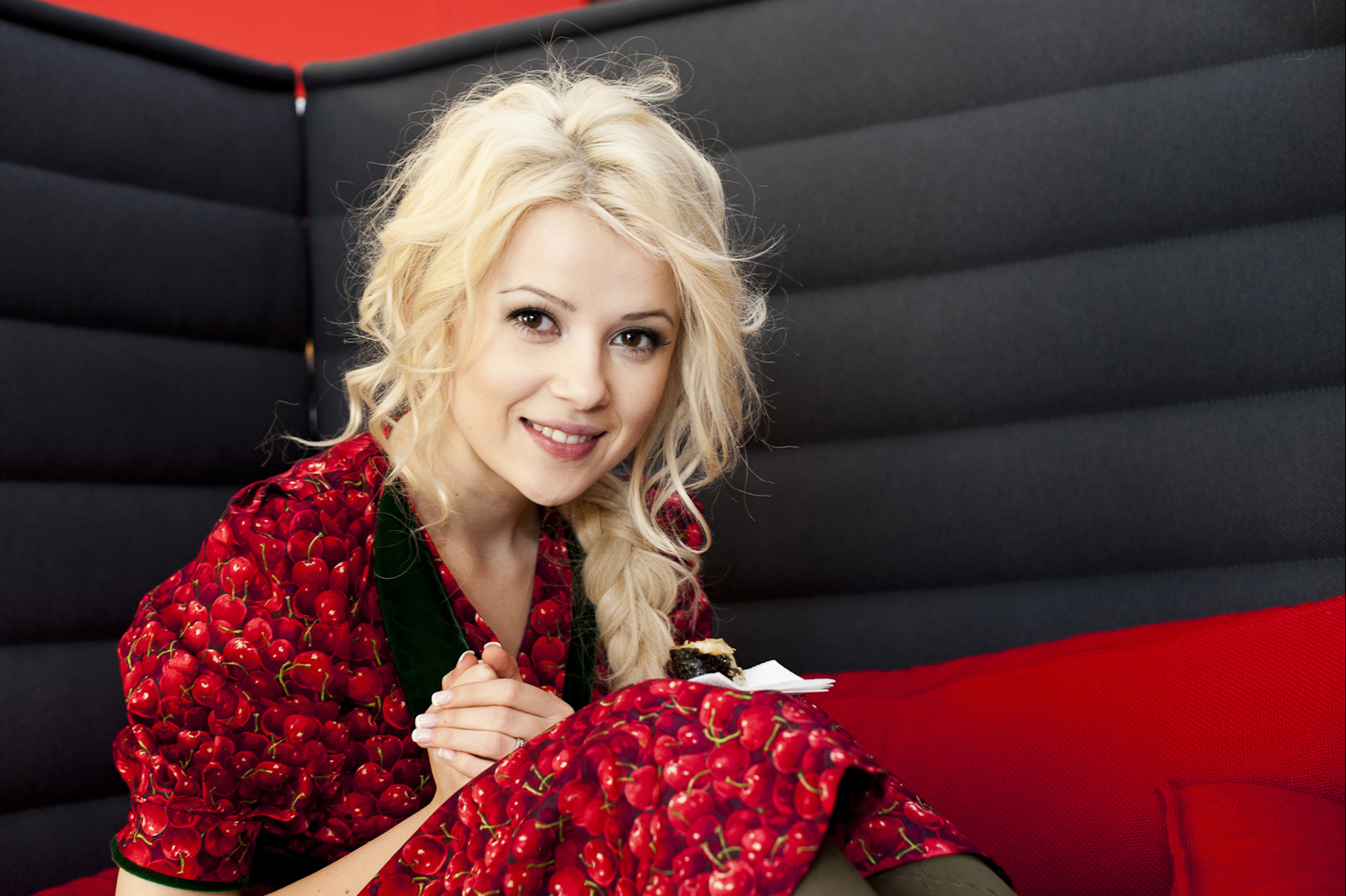
Mika Newton at the Eurovision Song Contest 2011

All countries except the "Big Five" (France, Germany, Italy, Spain and the United Kingdom), and the host country, are required to qualify from one of two semi-finals in order to compete for the final; the top ten countries from each semi-final progress to the final. The European Broadcasting Union (EBU) split up the competing countries into six different pots based on voting patterns from previous contests, with countries with favourable voting histories put into the same pot. On 17 January 2011, a special allocation draw was held which placed each country into one of the two semi-finals, as well as which half of the show they would perform in. Ukraine was placed into the second semi-final, to be held on 12 May 2011, and was scheduled to perform in the first half of the show. The running order for the semi-finals was decided through another draw on 15 March 2011 and Ukraine was set to perform in position 6, following the entry from Slovakia and before the entry from Moldova.

In Ukraine, both the semi-finals and the final were broadcast on Pershyi Natsionalnyi with commentary by Timur Miroshnychenko and Tetiana Terekhova. The three shows were also broadcast via radio on Radio Ukraine with commentary by Olena Zelinchenko. The Ukrainian spokesperson, who announced the Ukrainian votes during the final, was Ukrainian Eurovision 2004 winner Ruslana.

=== Semi-final ===
Mika Newton took part in technical rehearsals on 2 and 6 May, followed by dress rehearsals on 9 and 10 May. This included the jury show on 9 May where the professional juries of each country watched and voted on the competing entries.

The Ukrainian performance featured Mika Newton performing on stage in a long skin coloured dress with feathers on her shoulders designed by Olga Navrotskaya together with a sand artist and a backing vocalist. The stage displayed blue rays of light shining down on Newton and the LED screens displayed images painted by the sand artist on a table, which according to the latter depicted the story of a little girl that lost her mom, and an angel comes and saves her when she feels only indifference from other people. The stage director and choreographer for the Ukrainian performance was Anatolii Zalevskyi. The sand artist that joined Mika Newton on stage was Kseniya Simonova.

At the end of the show, Ukraine was announced as having finished in the top 10 and subsequently qualifying for the grand final. It was later revealed that Ukraine placed sixth in the semi-final, receiving a total of 81 points.

=== Final ===
Shortly after the second semi-final, a winners' press conference was held for the ten qualifying countries. As part of this press conference, the qualifying artists took part in a draw to determine the running order for the final. This draw was done in the order the countries were announced during the semi-final. Ukraine was drawn to perform in position 23, following the entry from Spain and before the entry from Serbia.

Mika Newton once again took part in dress rehearsals on 13 and 14 May before the final, including the jury final where the professional juries cast their final votes before the live show. Mika Newton performed a repeat of her semi-final performance during the final on 14 May. Ukraine placed fourth in the final, scoring 159 points.

=== Voting ===
Voting during the three shows consisted of 50 percent public televoting and 50 percent from a jury deliberation. The jury consisted of five music industry professionals who were citizens of the country they represent. This jury was asked to judge each contestant based on: vocal capacity; the stage performance; the song's composition and originality; and the overall impression by the act. In addition, no member of a national jury could be related in any way to any of the competing acts in such a way that they cannot vote impartially and independently.

Following the release of the full split voting by the EBU after the conclusion of the competition, it was revealed that Ukraine had placed fourth with the public televote and seventh with the jury vote in the final. In the public vote, Ukraine scored 168 points, while with the jury vote, Ukraine scored 117 points. In the second semi-final, Ukraine placed fifth with the public televote with 91 points and seventh with the jury vote, scoring 76 points.

Below is a breakdown of points awarded to Ukraine and awarded by Ukraine in the second semi-final and grand final of the contest. The nation awarded its 12 points to Slovakia in the semi-final and to Georgia in the final of the contest.

==== Points awarded to Ukraine ====
Points awarded to Ukraine (Semi-final 2)
Score	Country
12 points	Belarus
10 points	Slovakia
8 points	Israel; Moldova
7 points	Estonia
6 points	Italy; Macedonia; Slovenia
5 points	Cyprus
4 points	Bosnia and Herzegovina
3 points	Bulgaria; Sweden
2 points	Romania
1 point	Denmark

Points awarded to Ukraine (Final)
Score	Country
12 points	Armenia; Azerbaijan; Slovakia
10 points	Belarus; Georgia; Russia
8 points	Bulgaria; Moldova
7 points	Greece; Israel; Italy; Macedonia; Portugal; Turkey
6 points	Serbia; Slovenia
5 points	Croatia; Cyprus
4 points	Malta
3 points	Albania
2 points	Poland; Romania; Sweden
1 point	

==== Points awarded by Ukraine ====
Points awarded by Ukraine (Semi-final 2)
Score	Country
12 points	Slovakia
10 points	Belarus
8 points	Estonia
7 points	Macedonia
6 points	Cyprus
5 points	Sweden
4 points	Bosnia and Herzegovina
3 points	Denmark
2 points	Ireland
1 point	Austria

Points awarded by Ukraine (Final)
Score	Country
12 points	Georgia
10 points	Azerbaijan
8 points	Russia
7 points	Moldova
6 points	Greece
5 points	France
4 points	Hungary
3 points	United Kingdom
2 points	Estonia
1 point	Sweden
