= Cyprus in the Eurovision Song Contest 2011 =

- Eurovision Song Contest 2011
- Participating broadcaster: Cyprus Broadcasting Corporation (CyBC)
- Country: Cyprus
- Selection process: Artist: Performance; Song: Internal selection
- Selection date: Artist: 10 September 2010; Song: 20 January 2011

Competing entry
- Song: "San aggelos s'agapisa"
- Artist: Christos Mylordos
- Songwriters: Andreas Anastasiou; Michalis Antoniou

Placement
- Semi-final result: Failed to qualify (18th)

Participation chronology

Cyprus was represented at the Eurovision Song Contest 2011 with the song "San aggelos s'agapisa" written by Andreas Anastasiou and Michalis Antoniou. The song was performed by Christos Mylordos. The Cypriot broadcaster Cyprus Broadcasting Corporation (CyBC) organised the talent show Performance in order to select the Cypriot artist for the 2011 contest in Düsseldorf, Germany. The talent show featured 39 contestants and resulted in the selection of Mylordos as the winning artist at the final on 10 September 2010, where nine contestants remained. The Cypriot song, "San aggelos s'agapisa", was presented to the public on 20 January 2011.

Cyprus was drawn to compete in the second semi-final of the Eurovision Song Contest which took place on 12 May 2011. Performing during the show in position 9, "San aggelos s'agapisa" was not announced among the top 10 entries of the second semi-final and therefore did not qualify to compete in the final. It was later revealed that Cyprus placed 18th out of the 19 participating countries in the semi-final with 16 points.

== Background ==
Prior to the 2011 contest, Cyprus had participated in the Eurovision Song Contest twenty-eight times since their debut in the 1981 contest. Its best placing was fifth, which it achieved three times: in the 1982 competition with the song "Mono i agapi" performed by Anna Vissi, in the 1997 edition with "Mana mou" performed by Hara and Andreas Constantinou, and the 2004 contest with "Stronger Every Minute" performed by Lisa Andreas. Cyprus' least successful result was in the 1986 contest when it placed last with the song "Tora zo" by Elpida, receiving only four points in total. However, its worst finish in terms of points received was when it placed second to last in the 1999 contest with "Tha'nai erotas" by Marlain Angelidou, receiving only two points. The nation managed to qualify to the final in 2010 and place twenty-first with the song "Life Looks Better in Spring" performed by Jon Lilygreen and the Islanders.

The Cypriot national broadcaster, Cyprus Broadcasting Corporation (CyBC), broadcasts the event within Cyprus and organises the selection process for the nation's entry. CyBC confirmed their intentions to participate at the 2011 Eurovision Song Contest on 23 December 2009. Cyprus has used various methods to select the Cypriot entry in the past, such as internal selections and televised national finals to choose the performer, song or both to compete at Eurovision. Since 2008, the broadcaster has organised a national final to select the Cypriot entry. However, CyBC opted to organise the talent show Performance to select the artist for the 2011 contest with the song being selected via an internal selection.

== Before Eurovision ==
=== Artist selection ===
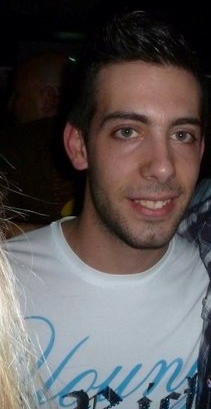
Christos Mylordos (pictured in 2012) was selected as the entrant for Cyprus during the show Performance in September 2010.

The "Song Interpretation" category of the talent show Performance, developed by CyBC, selected the Cypriot artist for the Eurovision Song Contest 2011. The competition, which took place at the CyBC studios in Nicosia, hosted by Marina Maleni and broadcast on RIK 1, RIK Sat as well as online via cybc.cy, commenced on 11 June 2010 and featured 39 contestants aged between 16 and 30. Nine contestants were selected by the combination of votes from a four-member judging panel consisting of Cypriot 1985 Eurovision representative Lia Vissi, musician and music teacher Costas Kakoyiannis, actor Neoclis Neocleous and choreographer Fotis Nikolaou (60%) and televoting (40%) to progress to the final on 10 September 2010. Among the finalists was 2006 Cypriot Junior Eurovision entrant Louis Panagiotou. During the final, Christos Mylordos who covered the song "Supreme" by Robbie Williams was selected as the winner exclusively by a public televote.

Final of Performance – 10 September 2010
R/O	Artist	Televote	Place
1	Marios Charalambous	1,476	6
2	Daphne Seisou	3,232	5
3	Annita Skoutela	4,244	3
4	Costa Ioannides	989	8
5	Louis Panagiotou	5,924	2
6	Malvina Charalambidi	1,338	7
7	Christos Mylordos	11,004	1
8	Stella Stylianou	3,851	4
9	Nicole Nikolaidou	852	9

==== Reception ====
The selection of Christos Mylordos as the Cypriot representative was met with dissatisfaction from the local press and Eurovision fans due to his lack of experience and poor vocal abilities. This led to speculations that CyBC had considered several options to reinforce Mylordou, including invitations to other contestants of Performance as well as Alex Panayi, who had already represented Cyprus in 1995 and 2000, to join the Cypriot team as backing vocalists. Panayi later denied the rumors but said that he was willing to help and support if asked by CyBC.

=== Song selection ===
On 26 November 2010, CyBC announced that composers were able to submit their songs to the broadcaster until 31 December 2010. All songwriters were required to have Cypriot nationality, origin or residency as of 2009 and submit songs, preferably in traditional style, with Greek language lyrics. At the conclusion of the deadline, 11 songs were received by CyBC. On 20 January 2011, the broadcaster announced that a seven-member selection committee had internally selected "San aggelos s'agapisa" as Mylordos' contest song. The song along with its official preview video, directed by Maria Charis, was presented to the public on 28 February 2011 during the CyBC evening news broadcast.

=== Promotion ===
Mylordou specifically promoted "San aggelos s'agapisa" as the Cypriot Eurovision entry on 2 March 2011 by performing the song during the Greek Eurovision national final Ellinikós Telikós 2011. He also performed during the Eurovision in Concert event which was held on 14 April at the Club Air venue in Amsterdam, Netherlands and hosted by Cornald Maas, Esther Hart and Sascha Korf.

== At Eurovision ==
All countries except the "Big Five" (France, Germany, Italy, Spain and the United Kingdom), and the host country, are required to qualify from one of two semi-finals in order to compete for the final; the top ten countries from each semi-final progress to the final. The European Broadcasting Union (EBU) split up the competing countries into six different pots based on voting patterns from previous contests, with countries with favourable voting histories put into the same pot. On 17 January 2011, an allocation draw was held which placed each country into one of the two semi-finals, as well as which half of the show they would perform in. Cyprus was placed into the second semi-final, to be held on 12 May 2011, and was scheduled to perform in the first half of the show. The running order for the semi-finals was decided through another draw on 15 March 2011 and Cyprus was set to perform in position 9, following the entry from Sweden and before the entry from Bulgaria.

The two semi-finals and the final were broadcast in Cyprus on RIK 1, RIK SAT, RIK HD, RIK Deftero and RIK Triton with commentary by Melina Karageorgiou. The Cypriot spokesperson, who announced the Cypriot votes during the final, was Loukas Hamatsos.

=== Semi-final ===
Mylordos took part in technical rehearsals on 3 and 7 May, followed by dress rehearsals on 11 and 12 May. This included the jury show on 11 May where the professional juries of each country watched and voted on the competing entries.

The Cypriot performance featured Mylordos joined on stage by four male backing vocalists and dancers, all dressed in black with silver elements in their belts and accessories. During the performance, Mylordos and the male backing performers leaned over at an approximately 45-degree angle by using boots that were fixed to the floor and accompanied with smoke effects, while a female backing vocalist, dressed in white, was located on the satellite stage and swung a large circular object during parts of the song. The LED screens displayed floating diamonds and crystals as well as large circular objects that leaned over in the same angles as the male performers. The choreographer for the performance was Fotis Nicolaou. The male backing performers that joined Mylordos were Aggelos Agathangelou, Antoniou Antonis, Christos Nicolaou and Pavlos Polichrinis, while the female backing vocalist was Chrissie Andreou. 1995 and 2000 Cypriot Eurovision entrant Alex Panayi was previously rumoured by to have been considered by CyBC as one of the backing vocalists, which was denied by the singer who also stated that he was willing to help and support if asked by the broadcaster.

At the end of the show, Cyprus was not announced among the top 10 entries in the second semi-final and therefore failed to qualify to compete in the final. It was later revealed that Cyprus placed 18th in the semi-final, receiving a total of 16 points.

=== Voting ===
Voting during the three shows consisted of 50 percent public televoting and 50 percent from a jury deliberation. The jury consisted of five music industry professionals who were citizens of the country they represent. This jury was asked to judge each contestant based on: vocal capacity; the stage performance; the song's composition and originality; and the overall impression by the act. In addition, no member of a national jury could be related in any way to any of the competing acts in such a way that they cannot vote impartially and independently.

Following the release of the full split voting by the EBU after the conclusion of the competition, it was revealed that Cyprus had placed 18th with the public televote and 17th with the jury vote in the second semi-final. In the public vote, Cyprus scored 23 points, while with the jury vote, Cyprus scored 24 points.

Below is a breakdown of points awarded to Cyprus and awarded by Cyprus in the second semi-final and grand final of the contest. The nation awarded its 12 points to Sweden in the semi-final and to Greece in the final of the contest.

==== Points awarded to Cyprus ====
Points awarded to Cyprus (Semi-final 2)
Score	Country
12 points	
10 points	
8 points	Italy
7 points	
6 points	Ukraine
5 points	
4 points	
3 points	
2 points	Germany
1 point	

==== Points awarded by Cyprus ====
Points awarded by Cyprus (Semi-final 2)
Score	Country
12 points	Sweden
10 points	Bulgaria
8 points	Romania
7 points	Slovenia
6 points	Denmark
5 points	Ukraine
4 points	Austria
3 points	Belarus
2 points	Belgium
1 point	Israel

Points awarded by Cyprus (Final)
Score	Country
12 points	Greece
10 points	Sweden
8 points	Azerbaijan
7 points	France
6 points	Slovenia
5 points	Ukraine
4 points	United Kingdom
3 points	Denmark
2 points	Russia
1 point	Italy
