= Italy in the Eurovision Song Contest 2011 =

- Eurovision Song Contest 2011
- Participating broadcaster: Radiotelevisione italiana (RAI)
- Country: Italy
- Selection process: Sanremo Music Festival 2011
- Selection date: Artist: 19 February 2011; Song: 11 March 2011

Competing entry
- Song: "Madness of Love"
- Artist: Raphael Gualazzi
- Songwriters: Raphael Gualazzi

Placement
- Final result: 2nd, 189 points

Participation chronology

Italy was represented at the Eurovision Song Contest 2011 with the song "Madness of Love", written and performed by Raphael Gualazzi. The Italian participating broadcaster, Radiotelevisione italiana (RAI), used the Sanremo Music Festival 2011 to select its entry for the contest. This entry marked the return of Italy to the contest after a 13-year absence, having last participated in the 1997 contest. The entry finished second after the winning song from Azerbaijan.

== Background ==
Radiotelevisione italiana (RAI) was one of the seven broadcasters to take part in the first contest in 1956. The Eurovision Song Contest was initially inspired by the Italian Sanremo Music Festival, held annually since 1951 in the city of Sanremo. Since its debut it has taken part 37 times representing Italy, and has won the contest twice – in 1964 with the song "Non ho l'età" performed by Gigliola Cinquetti, and in 1990 with "Insieme: 1992" performed by Toto Cutugno. It has also come 2nd once – again with Gigliola Cinquetti and the song "Sì" in 1974, and 3rd four times – including the global hit song "Nel blu, dipinto di blu", also known as "Volare", performed by Domenico Modugno in 1958. RAI has also hosted the contest twice – in 1965 in Naples, and in 1991 in Rome.

Since its debut RAI has withdrawn from the contest a number of times. The first occurrence was in 1981, claiming that interest in the contest in Italy had diminished. It returned in 1983, and withdrew again in 1986, returning the following year. In 1994 it withdrew again, before returning again in 1997. After the 1997 contest, RAI withdrew again, and did not return until the 2011 contest.

=== Return to Eurovision ===
Since their withdrawal in 1997, the European Broadcasting Union (EBU) had worked hard to bring Italy back to Eurovision. Since the 2009 Contest Italy's return – along with that of Monaco and Austria – was made a priority of the EBU.

In September 2010, it was announced by Massimo Liofredi, chairman of Rai 2, that the winner of the fourth series of the Italian version of The X Factor may represent Italy at the Eurovision Song Contest 2011, rather than compete in the Sanremo Music Festival as in previous years. This raised hopes that Italy would return to Eurovision after 14 years of absence. On 2 December 2010, the EBU announced on the official Eurovision website that RAI had applied for the 2011 contest, set to be held on 10, 12, and 14 May 2011 in Düsseldorf, Germany.

== Before Eurovision ==
=== Artist selection ===
On 1 February 2011, RAI confirmed that the performer that would represent Italy at the Eurovision Song Contest 2011 would be selected by a special committee from the competing artists at the Sanremo Music Festival 2011. The committee consisted of Gianni Morandi, Mauro Mazza (Rai 1 director), Massimo Liofredi (Rai 2 director), Marco Simeon (director of international affairs), Maurizio Zoccarato (mayor of Sanremo) and Giorgio Giuffra (Sanremo's promotional board member). The competition took place between 15–19 February 2011 with the winner being selected on the last day of the festival. The competing artists in the "Big Artists" and "Newcomers" category were:

==== "Big Artists" Category ====
- Al Bano
- Anna Oxa
- Anna Tatangelo
- Davide Van De Sfroos
- Giusy Ferreri
- La Crus
- Luca Barbarossa and Raquel del Rosario
- Luca Madonia and Franco Battiato
- Max Pezzali
- Modà feat. Emma
- Nathalie
- Patty Pravo
- Roberto Vecchioni
- Tricarico

==== "Newcomers" Category ====
- Anansi
- BTwins
- Gabriella Ferrone
- Marco Menichini
- Micaela
- Raphael Gualazzi
- Roberto Amadè
- Serena Abrami

During the final evening of the Sanremo Music Festival 2011, Raphael Gualazzi was announced as the artist that would represent Italy at the Eurovision Song Contest 2011. Roberto Vecchioni was selected as the winner with the song "Chiamami ancora amore".

The website Rockit.it, in July 2011, released an interview conducted in February of the same year during the days of the Sanremo Festival, in which a record executive from Sugar Music (Raphael Gualazzi’s record label) revealed that Marco Menichini had already been considered the winner among the newcomers category . The singer had already received widespread approval from the audience, but the article merely states that “some things happened”, leaving a question mark on the subject. To this day, nothing is known about what actually occurred.

=== Song selection ===
On 11 March 2011, RAI confirmed that Raphael Gualazzi would perform a bilingual Italian and English version of his Sanremo Music Festival 2011 Newcomers category winning song "Follia d'amore", which would be titled "Madness of Love" at the Eurovision Song Contest 2011.

== At Eurovision ==
Italy automatically qualified for the grand final, on 14 May 2011; as part of the "Big Five", and would vote in the second semi-final. At the finals, the Italian entry performed 12th and in the voting, was placed second to the Azerbaijani entry Running Scared by Ell and Nikki with 189 points. The public awarded Italy 11th place with 99 points and the jury awarded 1st place with 251 points.

=== Voting ===
==== Points awarded to Italy ====
Points awarded to Italy (Final)
Score	Country
12 points	Albania; Latvia; San Marino; Spain
10 points	Greece; Lithuania; Malta; Poland; Portugal
8 points	France
7 points	Georgia; United Kingdom
6 points	Armenia; Austria; Belgium; Bosnia and Herzegovina; Estonia; Romania
5 points	Ireland
4 points	Hungary; Switzerland
3 points	Belarus; Finland; Germany; Iceland; Slovenia
2 points	Serbia
1 point	Azerbaijan; Cyprus; Macedonia

==== Points awarded by Italy ====
Points awarded by Italy (Semi-final 2)
Score	Country
12 points	Romania
10 points	Bulgaria
8 points	Cyprus
7 points	Moldova
6 points	Ukraine
5 points	Austria
4 points	Bosnia and Herzegovina
3 points	Sweden
2 points	Belgium
1 point	Israel

Points awarded by Italy (Final)
Score	Country
12 points	Romania
10 points	United Kingdom
8 points	Moldova
7 points	Ukraine
6 points	Germany
5 points	Iceland
4 points	Bosnia and Herzegovina
3 points	Serbia
2 points	Greece
1 point	France
