= Russia in the Eurovision Song Contest 2011 =

- Eurovision Song Contest 2011
- Country: Russia
- Selection process: Internal selection
- Announcement date: Artist: 5 March 2011; Song: 12 March 2011

Competing entry
- Song: "Get You"
- Artist: Alexey Vorobyov
- Songwriters: Alexey Vorobyov; RedOne; AJ Junior; Bilal Hajji; Eric Sanicola

Placement
- Semi-final result: Qualified (9th, 64 points)
- Final result: 16th, 77 points

Participation chronology

Russia was represented at the Eurovision Song Contest 2011 with the song "Get You", written by Alexey Vorobyov, RedOne, AJ Junior, Bilal Hajji, and Eric Sanicola, and performed by Vorobyov. The entry was internally selected. This was the country's fifteenth participation in the contest after debuting in 1994. Russia qualified from the first semi-final and placed 16th in the final, scoring 77 points.

== Before Eurovision ==
=== Internal selection ===
On 5 March 2011, C1R announced that they had internally selected Alexey Vorobyov to represent Russia in Düsseldorf with the song "Get You" produced by RedOne. Vorobyov previously attempted to represent Russia at the Eurovision Song Contest twice, placing fifth in the 2008 national final with the song "New Russian Kalinka" and placing fourth in the 2009 national final with the song "Angelom byt". RedOne also composed the entry "Dance Alone" performed by Love Generation which failed to qualify from the Second Chance round of the 2011 Swedish Eurovision national final Melodifestivalen 2011. Alexey Vorobyov was selected as the Russian entrant by an expert committee from nine shortlisted candidates, among them which also included Alexey Vorobyov, Avraam Russo, Buranovskiye Babushki, Glukoza, Jamala, Mark Tishman, Philipp Kirkorov, Vera Brezhneva (Note: After rumors began to circulate that Russia would be represented by Vera Brezhneva, Vera said that she would not go due to the fact that "Such an event takes a lot of energy and nerves".) and Vlad Sokolovsky, as reported by Russian media.

"Get You" was set to be presented to the public on 12 March 2011 during the Russian version of Star Academy, broadcast on Channel One, however the song was leaked on YouTube prior to the presentation on 6 March 2011. "Get You" was written and composed by RedOne, AJ Junior, Bilal "The Chef", Eric Sanicola and Vorobyov himself.

== At Eurovision ==
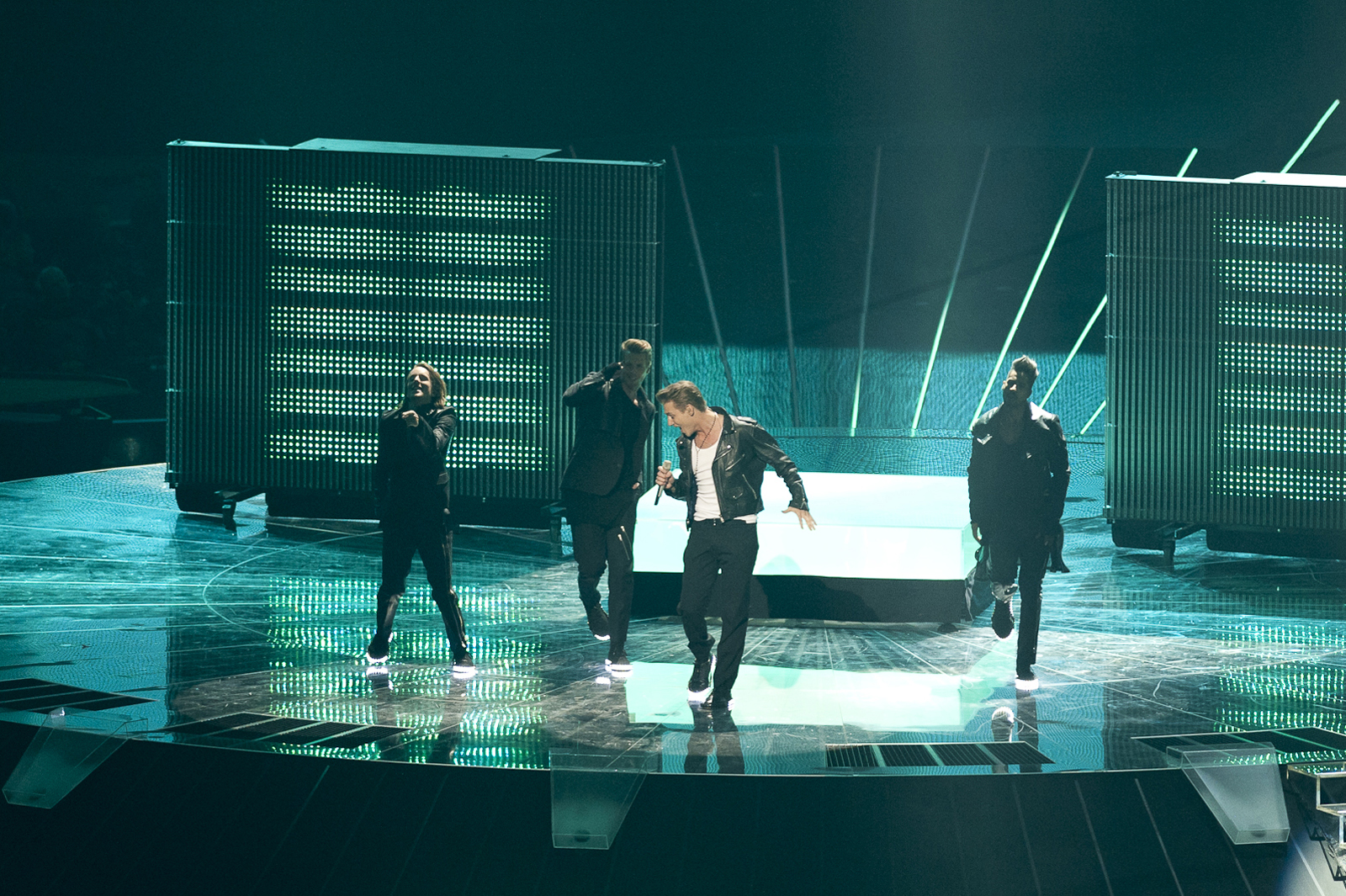
Alex Vorobyov performing "Get You" at the final of the Eurovision Song Contest 2011 on 14 May 2011

Russia began the Eurovision journey with Alex Sparrow (Alexey Vorobyov) as their representative in 2011. Russia competed in the first semi-final on 10 May 2011, with position 7. Russia had been tipped as an early favourite by the bookmakers to win the 2011 contest. After voting ended, Russia qualified for the grand final on Saturday 14 May, achieving 9th place and 64 points. The public awarded Russia 4th place with 93 points and the jury awarded 16th place with 31 points. After the first semi, Russia drew position 10 for the grand final. At the end of voting in the grand final, Russia ended 16th with 77 points, the worst placing for Russia since 1995, and only the second time they placed outside the top 15. The public awarded Russia 7th place with 138 points and the jury awarded 25th (last) place with 25 points.

=== Voting ===
==== Points awarded to Russia ====
Points awarded to Russia (Semi-final 1)
Score	Country
12 points	Armenia
10 points	
8 points	
7 points	
6 points	Serbia
5 points	Azerbaijan; Croatia; Georgia; Lithuania
4 points	Norway
3 points	Albania; Finland; Greece; Hungary; Iceland; Portugal; Turkey
2 points	
1 point	San Marino

Points awarded to Russia (Final)
Score	Country
12 points	
10 points	
8 points	Armenia; Israel; Ukraine
7 points	
6 points	Lithuania
5 points	Belarus; Estonia; Germany; Moldova
4 points	Albania; Azerbaijan; Bulgaria; Georgia; Serbia
3 points	Hungary
2 points	Cyprus
1 point	Greece; Iceland

==== Points awarded by Russia ====
Points awarded by Russia (Semi-final 1)
Score	Country
12 points	Finland
10 points	Azerbaijan
8 points	Armenia
7 points	Lithuania
6 points	Greece
5 points	Georgia
4 points	Serbia
3 points	Iceland
2 points	Turkey
1 point	Croatia

Points awarded by Russia (Final)
Score	Country
12 points	Azerbaijan
10 points	Ukraine
8 points	Greece
7 points	Moldova
6 points	Georgia
5 points	Slovenia
4 points	United Kingdom
3 points	France
2 points	Lithuania
1 point	Sweden
