= Moldova in the Eurovision Song Contest 2011 =

- Eurovision Song Contest 2011
- Participating broadcaster: TeleRadio-Moldova (TRM)
- Country: Moldova
- Selection process: O melodie pentru Europa 2011
- Selection date: 26 February 2011

Competing entry
- Song: "So Lucky"
- Artist: Zdob şi Zdub
- Songwriters: Roman Iagupov; Mihai Gîncu; Andy Shuman; Marc Elsner

Placement
- Semi-final result: Qualified (10th, 54 points)
- Final result: 12th, 97 points

Participation chronology

Moldova was represented at the Eurovision Song Contest 2011 with the song "So Lucky" written by Roman Iagupov, Mihai Gîncu, Andy Shuman and Marc Elsner. The song was performed by the band Zdob şi Zdub. The Moldovan participating broadcaster, TeleRadio-Moldova (TRM), organised the national final O melodie pentru Europa 2011 in order to select the Moldovan entry for the 2011 contest in Düsseldorf, Germany. 98 entries competed to represent Moldova in Düsseldorf, with 25 being shortlisted to participate in the televised national final which took place on 26 February 2011 after auditioning in front of a jury panel. "So Lucky" performed by Zdob şi Zdub emerged as the winner after gaining the most points following the combination of votes from a jury panel and a public televote.

Moldova was drawn to compete in the second semi-final of the Eurovision Song Contest which took place on 12 May 2011. Performing during the show in position 7, "So Lucky" was announced among the top 10 entries of the second semi-final and therefore qualified to compete in the final on 14 May. It was later revealed that Moldova placed tenth out of the 19 participating countries in the semi-final with 54 points. In the final, Moldova performed in position 15 and placed twelfth out of the 25 participating countries, scoring 97 points.

== Background ==
Prior to the 2011 Contest, Moldova had participated in the Eurovision Song Contest six times since its first entry in 2005. The nation's best placing in the contest was sixth, which it achieved in 2005 with the song "Boonika bate doba" performed by Zdob și Zdub. Other than their debut entry, to this point, Moldova's only other top ten placing at the contest was achieved in 2007 where "Fight" performed by Natalia Barbu placed tenth. In the 2010 contest, "Run Away" performed by SunStroke Project and Olia Tira qualified Moldova to compete in the final and placed twenty-second.

The Moldovan national broadcaster, TeleRadio-Moldova (TRM), broadcast the event within Moldova and organised the selection process for the nation's entry. TRM confirmed their intentions to participate at the 2011 Eurovision Song Contest on 7 December 2010. Moldova has selected their entry via a national selection show since 2008, a procedure that was continued for their 2011 participation.

== Before Eurovision ==
=== O melodie pentru Europa 2011 ===
O melodie pentru Europa 2011 was the national final format developed by TRM in order to select Moldova's entry for the Eurovision Song Contest 2011. The event took place at the TRM Studio 2 in Chișinău, hosted by Dianna Rotaru and Gabriel Coveseanu, and included a final to be held on 26 February 2011. The show was broadcast on Moldova 1, TV Moldova Internațional and Radio Moldova as well as online via the broadcaster's official website trm.md. The national final was watched by 380,000 viewers in Moldova.

==== Competing entries ====
Artists and composers had the opportunity to submit their entries between 27 December 2010 and 16 January 2011. Artists were required to be of Moldovan nationality and could submit more than one song, while songwriters could hold any nationality. At the conclusion of the submission deadline, 98 valid entries were received by the broadcaster. A jury consisting of Geta Burlacu (singer, 2008 Moldovan Eurovision entrant), Aura (singer), Anatol Chiriac (composer), Victoria Melnic (professor at the Academy of Music, Theatre and Fine Arts), Andrei Sava (composer), Liviu Stirbu (composer), Sorina Ștefârță (journalist), Vladimir Beleaev (composer) and Silvia Cărăuş (music critic) selected 60 out of the 98 received entries to proceed to the audition round. The live audition round took place on 29 January 2011 where 25 finalists were selected by the jury panel to advance. Entries were assessed on criteria such as vocals and manner of the performance and the originality of the song. "The Cave of Life" performed by Ianna Novac, "What You Say" performed by Janet Erhan and "Summer Is Following" performed by Veaceslav Daniliuc and Andrei Hadjiu were withdrawn from the competition and therefore did not attend the auditions.

Among the finalists were 2005 Moldovan Eurovision entrant Zdob şi Zdub and 2007 Moldovan Eurovision entrant Natalia Barbu. On 6 February 2011, "Solo por tu amor" performed by Katrina was disqualified from the competition due to the song being published before 1 September 2010 and replaced with the song "Ma pierd când o văd" performed by Dumitru Socican.

Artist	Song	Songwriter(s)
Adriana Voloşenco	"I Can Win the Game"	Alexei Nacai
Anişoara Balmuş	"You and I"	Elena Buga, Alexandru Gorgos
Aurel Chirtoacă	"Încă îndrăgostit"	Natalia Matcovschii, Aurel Chirtoacă
Boris Covali and Cristina Croitoru	"Break It Up"	Evgeny Oleinik, Yulia Bykova
Corina Cuniuc	"Şi tac"	Gicu Cimbir
Cristina Scarlat	"Every Day Will Be Your Day"	Lidia Scarlat, Ivan Aculov
Dana Marchitan	"Lucky You Lucky Me"	Rafael Artesero
Denis Latişev	"It's My First Dance With You"	Adrian Bors, Latişev Denis
Diana Staver	"Love Song"	Elena Buga, Valentin Dinga
Doiniţa Gherman	"Viaţa"	Doiniţa Gherman, Vadim Luchin, Timofei Tregubenco, Cătălin Gondiu
Dumitru Socican	"Ma pierd când o văd"	Dumitru Socican
Ion Krasnopolski	"Cu fanfara pînă dimineaţa"	Ion Diviza, Ion Krasnopolski
Karizma	"When Life is Grey"	Ionuț Adrian Radu
Katrina	"Solo por tu amor"	Olga Ciubuc
M-Studio	"Night Reflection"	M-Studio
Mariana Mihăilă	"Mi Rey!"	Mariana Mihăilă
Millenium	"In Memoriam"	Olga Gorcinschi
Natalia Barbu	"Let's Jazz"	Natalia Barbu, Mike Diamondz
Natan	"Dacă dragoste mai e"	Eugen Doibani
Nicoleta Gavriliţa	"Just Your Friend"	Elena Buga, Serghei Bilicenco
Odry	"Doina, dor nemărginit"	Radmila Popovici, Marian Stîrcea
Pasha	"Dorule"	Anastasia Larionova, Pasha Parfeny
Ruslan Țăranu	"Lumina mea"	Ruslan Țăranu
Vadim Luchin and Tamaz Djgarcava	"Always"	Tamaz Djgarcava
Valeria Tarasova	"This Is My Life"	Ralph Siegel, John O'Flynn
Zdob şi Zdub	"So Lucky"	Roman Iagupov, Mihai Gîncu, Andy Shuman, Marc Elsner

==== Final ====
The final took place on 26 February 2011. Twenty-five songs competed and the winner was selected based on the combination of a public televote and the votes of an expert jury. The jury that voted in the final included Vladimir Beleaev (composer), Anatol Chiriac (composer), Liviu Știrbu (composer), Andrei Sava (composer), Aura (singer), Geta Burlacu (singer, 2008 Moldovan Eurovision entrant), Victoria Melnic (professor at the Academy of Music, Theatre and Fine Arts), Sorina Ștefârță (journalist), Victoria Demici (songwriter), Ana Dubeli (Locals.md editor-in-chief), Viorel Ţigănaş (composer), Alex Calancea (instrumentalist and producer) and Ludmila Climoc (Orange Moldova representative). In addition to the performances of the competing entries, 2011 Romanian Eurovision entrants Hotel FM performed as a guest. "So Lucky" performed by Zdob şi Zdub was selected as the winner.

Final – 26 February 2011
R/O	Artist	Song	Jury		Televote		Total	Place
R/O	Artist	Song	Votes	Points	Percentage	Points	Total	Place
1	Natan	"Dacă dragoste mai e"	99	0	1.11%	0	0	14
2	Natalia Barbu	"Let's Jazz"	126	12	9.13%	7	19	2
3	Ion Krasnopolski	"Cu fanfara pînă dimineaţa"	67.5	0	1.34%	0	0	14
4	Anişoara Balmuş	"You and I"	66.5	0	0.25%	0	0	14
5	Denis Latişev	"It's My First Dance With You"	85	0	0.27%	0	0	14
6	Pasha	"Dorule"	121.5	8	10.84%	8	16	3
7	Doiniţa Gherman	"Viaţa"	92.5	0	1.82%	0	0	14
8	Corina Cuniuc	"Şi tac"	92	0	1.88%	1	1	13
9	Cristina Scarlat	"Every Day Will Be Your Day"	101.5	2	1.09%	0	2	12
10	Diana Staver	"Love Song"	74	0	0.61%	0	0	14
11	Dumitru Socican	"Ma pierd când o văd"	83.5	0	2.54%	3	3	10
12	Nicoleta Gavriliţa	"Just Your Friend"	90.5	0	0.72%	0	0	14
13	Adriana Voloşenco	"I Can Win the Game"	78.5	0	0.98%	0	0	14
14	Boris Covali and Cristina Croitoru	"Break It Up"	107	6	3.55%	5	11	6
15	Ruslan Țăranu	"Lumina mea"	80.5	0	0.58%	0	0	14
16	Millenium	"In Memoriam"	118.5	7	4.88%	6	13	5
17	Odry	"Doina, dor nemărginit"	96.5	0	1.08%	0	0	14
18	Karizma	"When Life Is Grey"	99.5	1	33.35%	12	13	4
19	Vadim Luchin and Tamaz Djgarcava	"Always"	89.5	0	1.62%	0	0	14
20	Mariana Mihăilă	"Mi Rey!"	93	0	3.08%	4	4	8
21	Valeria Tarasova	"This Is My Life"	107	5	2.54%	2	7	7
22	Aurel Chirtoacă	"Încă îndrăgostit"	104	4	0.97%	0	4	8
23	M-Studio	"Night Reflection"	104	3	1.79%	0	3	10
24	Zdob şi Zdub	"So Lucky"	122.5	10	13.15%	10	20	1
25	Dana Marchitan	"Lucky You Lucky Me"	98	0	0.83%	0	0	14

Detailed Jury Votes
R/O	Song	V. Beleaev	A. Chiriac	L. Știrbu	A. Sava	Aura	G. Burlacu	V. Melnic	S. Ștefârță	V. Demici	A. Dubeli	V. Ţigănaş	A. Calancea	L. Climoc	Total
1	"Dacă dragoste mai e"	5	6	6	8.5	10	9.5	9	8.5	7.5	7.5	7	8.5	6	99
2	"Let's Jazz"	10	10	8.5	10	10	9.5	10	10	10	9	10	10	9	126
3	"Cu fanfara pînă dimineaţa"	6	6	6	6.5	6	5	5	6	6	0	5	7	3	67.5
4	"You and I"	5	6	6	7.5	7	3	5	7	6.5	0	3	6.5	4	66.5
5	"It's My First Dance With You"	5.5	7	5	7	8	4	8.5	8	8.5	5	6	8	4.5	85
6	"Dorule"	7	10	9	10	10	8	9.5	10	9.5	10	10	10	8.5	121.5
7	"Viaţa"	7	6	8	7.5	8	6	7	9	8.5	5	6	8.5	6	92.5
8	"Şi tac"	7.5	7	6	8.5	8	8.5	8	7	8	4	7	8.5	4	92
9	"Every Day Will Be Your Day"	7	8	6.5	8	8	8.5	10	9	6	8	7	9	6.5	101.5
10	"Love Song"	7.5	6.5	6	8	7	3.5	6	6	6	1	5	6.5	5	74
11	"Ma pierd când o văd"	6.5	5	5.5	6.5	7	7.5	8	7.5	8	7	4	6.5	4.5	83.5
12	"Just Your Friend"	6.5	7	4	7	8	9.5	7	7	8	6	7	8	5.5	90.5
13	"I Can Win the Game"	7	6	4.5	7	7	6.5	5	7	7.5	1	6	8	6	78.5
14	"Break It Up"	5	8	7	9.5	10	8	7.5	9	9.5	9	6	9	9.5	107
15	"Lumina mea"	5.5	7.5	7.5	9	8	5.5	5	7	8	0	6	7.5	4	80.5
16	"In Memoriam"	10	9.5	8.5	9.5	10	10	9	9	10	8.5	8	10	6.5	118.5
17	"Doina, dor nemărginit"	7.5	8	6.5	8.5	10	5.5	8.5	8.5	7	8	6.5	8	4	96.5
18	"When Life is Grey"	5	7	8	8.5	9	9.5	7	8.5	9.5	8.5	6	8	5	99.5
19	"Always"	6	7	7	7.5	8	7.5	5.5	8	7	7	6	8	5	89.5
20	"Mi Rey!"	5	6.5	7	8	8	8	6	8	8.5	8	7	8.5	4.5	93
21	"This Is My Life"	6	8	7	9	9	9	8	8.5	8.5	8.5	8	9.5	8	107
22	"Încă îndrăgostit"	7	6.5	7.5	9	10	10	8	8.5	9	5	8	10	5.5	104
23	"Night Reflection"	10	5.5	7.5	8.5	10	9	9	8	8.5	6	8	9	5	104
24	"So Lucky"	10	10	8	10	10	10	9	8.5	10	10	7	10	10	122.5
25	"Lucky You Lucky Me"	6.5	6.5	7.5	8	9	8.5	7.5	8	9.5	8	7	8	4	98

=== Promotion ===
Zdob şi Zdub made several appearances across Europe to specifically promote "So Lucky" as the Moldovan Eurovision entry. On 9 April, Zdob şi Zdub performed during the special concert Düsseldorf, venim! which was held at the Liceul Teoretic "Nichita Stănescu" in Bucharest, Romania. On 24 April, Zdob şi Zdub performed during the farewell concert of Ukrainian Eurovision entrant Mika Newton, which was held at the Independence Square of Kyiv, Ukraine.

== At Eurovision ==
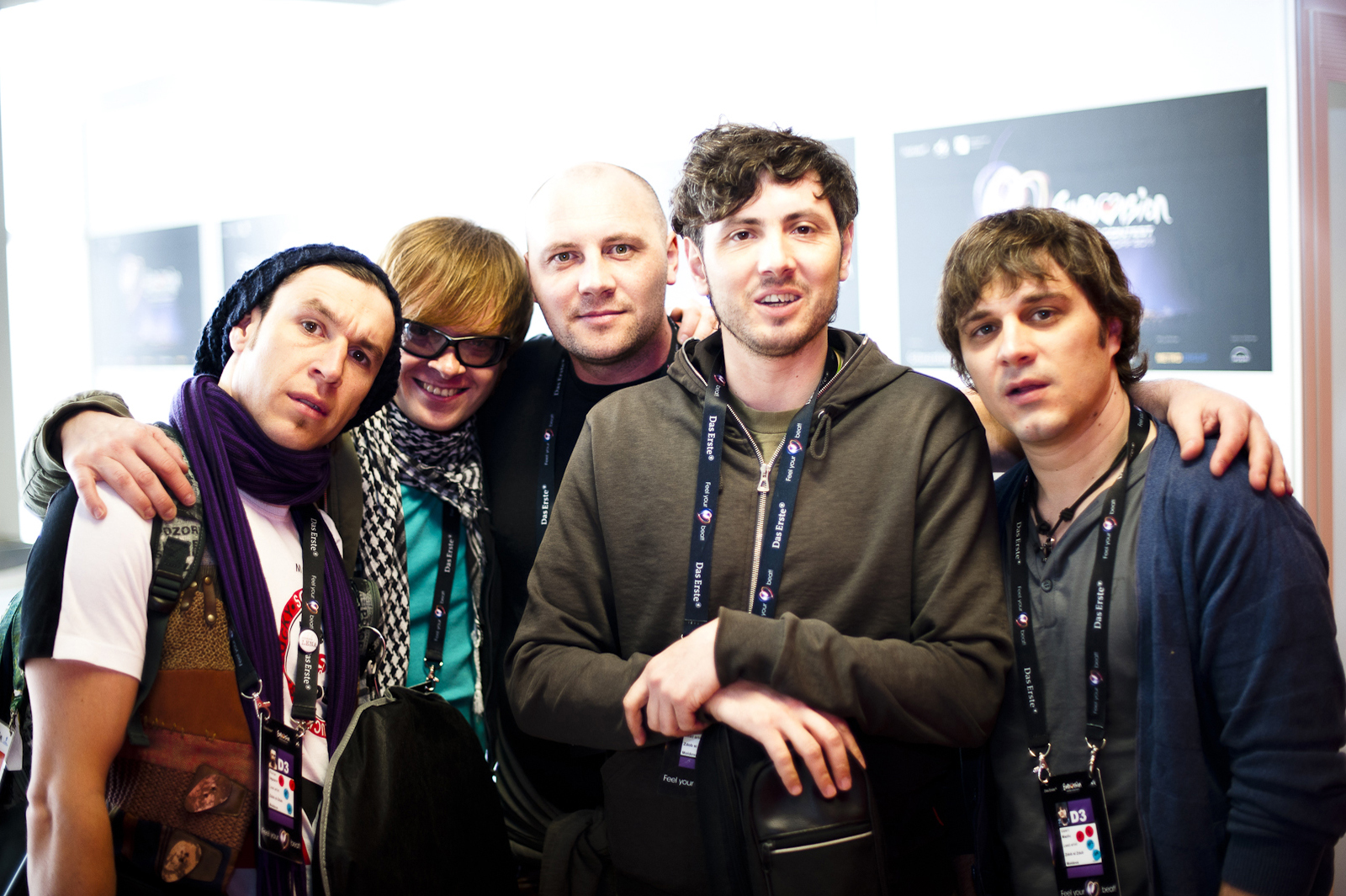
Zdob şi Zdub at the Eurovision Song Contest 2011

All countries except the "Big Five" (France, Germany, Italy, Spain and the United Kingdom), and the host country, are required to qualify from one of two semi-finals in order to compete for the final; the top ten countries from each semi-final progress to the final. The European Broadcasting Union (EBU) split up the competing countries into six different pots based on voting patterns from previous contests, with countries with favourable voting histories put into the same pot. On 17 January 2011, a special allocation draw was held which placed each country into one of the two semi-finals, as well as which half of the show they would perform in. Moldova was placed into the second semi-final, to be held on 12 May 2011, and was scheduled to perform in the first half of the show. The running order for the semi-finals was decided through another draw on 15 March 2011 and Moldova was set to perform in position 7, following the entry from Ukraine and before the entry from Sweden.

The two semi-finals and the final were televised in Moldova on Moldova 1 and TV Moldova Internațional as well as broadcast via radio on Radio Moldova. All broadcasts featured commentary by Marcel Spătari. The Moldovan spokesperson, who announced the Moldovan votes during the final, was 2008 Moldova Eurovision representative Geta Burlacu.

=== Semi-final ===
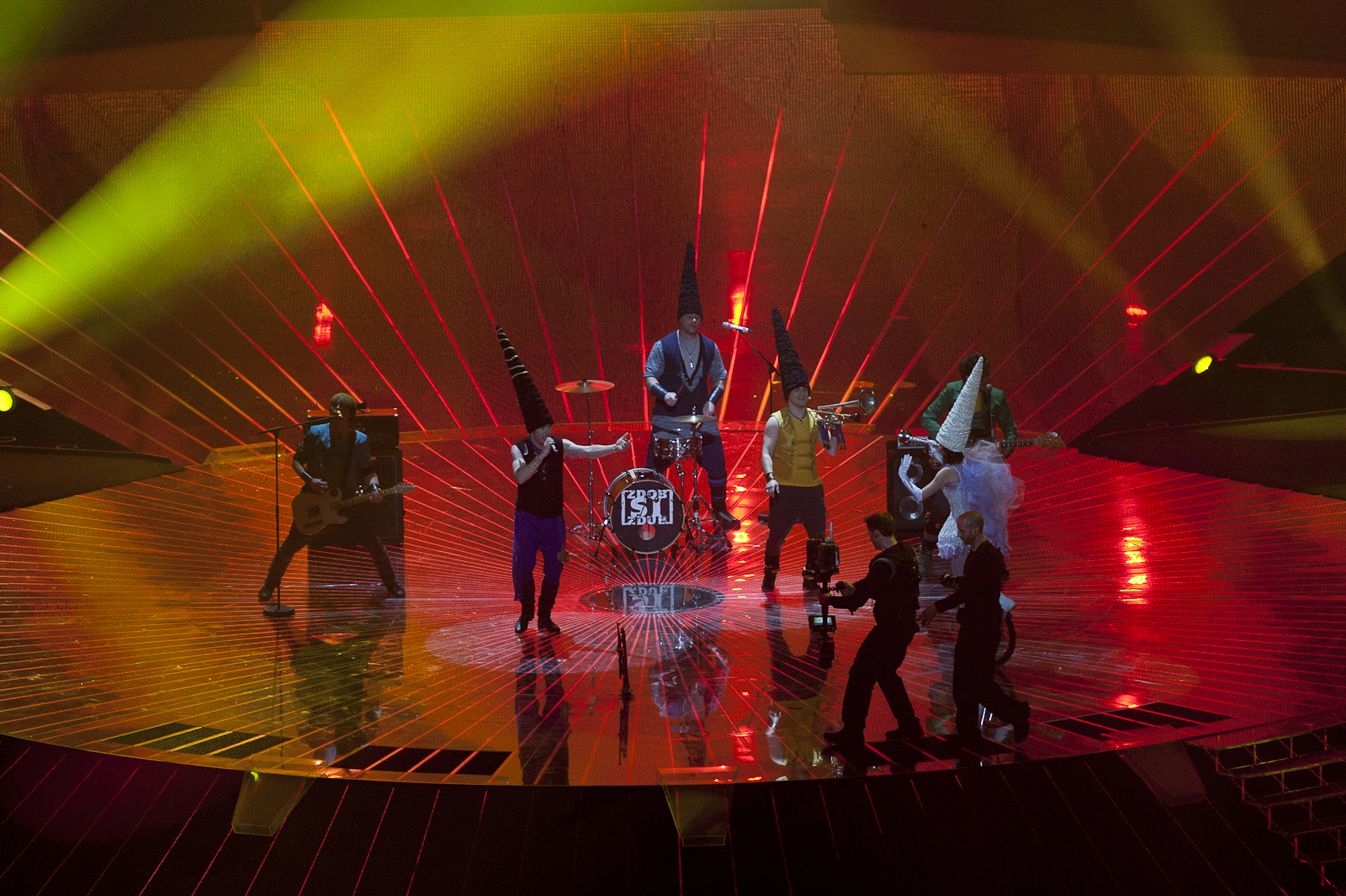
Zdob şi Zdub during a rehearsal before the second semi-final

Zdob şi Zdub took part in technical rehearsals on 2 and 6 May, followed by dress rehearsals on 9 and 10 May. This included the jury show on 9 May where the professional juries of each country watched and voted on the competing entries.

The Moldovan performance featured the members of Zdob şi Zdub in a band set-up, wearing tall black cone shaped hats and performing on stage with one dancer, who was dressed in a short white dress as a fairy. In regards to the cone hats, lead singer the band Roman Iagupov stated: "The hats are a Moldovan tradition, they are called Kushma's. They are like a kind of antennae, which bring cosmic power. All good people wear these type of hats in Moldova. It's a symbol from our sunny small country of Moldova." The dancer played a small trumpet and rode a unicycle around the stage, as well as being embraced at the end of the performance by Iagupov who subsequently put a monocle on his eye. The stage featured LED screen projections of red and black dolls dressed in folk costumes with tall pointed black hats. The dancer that joined Zdob şi Zdub on stage is Tatiana Iliescu.

At the end of the show, Moldova was announced as having finished in the top ten and subsequently qualifying for the grand final. It was later revealed that Moldova placed tenth in the semi-final, receiving a total of 54 points.

=== Final ===
Shortly after the second semi-final, a winners' press conference was held for the ten qualifying countries. As part of this press conference, the qualifying artists took part in a draw to determine the running order for the final. This draw was done in the order the countries were announced during the semi-final. Moldova was drawn to perform in position 15, following the entry from the United Kingdom and before the entry from Germany.

Zdob şi Zdub once again took part in dress rehearsals on 13 and 14 May before the final, including the jury final where the professional juries cast their final votes before the live show. The band performed a repeat of their semi-final performance during the final on 14 May. Moldova placed twelfth in the final, scoring 97 points.

=== Voting ===
Voting during the three shows consisted of 50 percent public televoting and 50 percent from a jury deliberation. The jury consisted of five music industry professionals who were citizens of the country they represent. This jury was asked to judge each contestant based on: vocal capacity; the stage performance; the song's composition and originality; and the overall impression by the act. In addition, no member of a national jury could be related in any way to any of the competing acts in such a way that they cannot vote impartially and independently.

Following the release of the full split voting by the EBU after the conclusion of the competition, it was revealed that Moldova had placed twelfth with the public televote and fifteenth with the jury vote in the final. In the public vote, Moldova scored 98 points, while with the jury vote, Moldova scored 82 points. In the second semi-final, Moldova placed eighth with the public televote with 62 points and thirteenth with the jury vote, scoring 53 points.

Below is a breakdown of points awarded to Moldova and awarded by Moldova in the second semi-final and grand final of the contest. The nation awarded its 12 points to Romania in the semi-final and the final of the contest.

==== Points awarded to Moldova ====
Points awarded to Moldova (Semi-final 2)
Score	Country
12 points	Romania
10 points	Belarus
8 points	
7 points	Italy
6 points	
5 points	Germany; Macedonia
4 points	Ireland; Israel; Slovakia
3 points	
2 points	Bulgaria
1 point	Latvia

Points awarded to Moldova (Final)
Score	Country
12 points	Romania
10 points	
8 points	Ireland; Italy; United Kingdom
7 points	Azerbaijan; Belarus; Russia; Ukraine
6 points	
5 points	Austria; Georgia; Portugal; Slovakia
4 points	France; Germany; Lithuania
3 points	
2 points	
1 point	Belgium

==== Points awarded by Moldova ====
Points awarded by Moldova (Semi-final 2)
Score	Country
12 points	Romania
10 points	Belarus
8 points	Ukraine
7 points	Slovakia
6 points	Belgium
5 points	Bulgaria
4 points	Slovenia
3 points	Sweden
2 points	Denmark
1 point	Macedonia

Points awarded by Moldova (Final)
Score	Country
12 points	Romania
10 points	Azerbaijan
8 points	Ukraine
7 points	Georgia
6 points	Estonia
5 points	Russia
4 points	United Kingdom
3 points	Sweden
2 points	France
1 point	Greece
