= Poland in the Eurovision Song Contest 2011 =

- Eurovision Song Contest 2011
- Participating broadcaster: Telewizja Polska (TVP)
- Country: Poland
- Selection process: Krajowe Eliminacje 2011
- Selection date: 14 February 2011

Competing entry
- Song: "Jestem"
- Artist: Magdalena Tul
- Songwriters: Magdalena Tul

Placement
- Semi-final result: Failed to qualify (19th)

Participation chronology

Poland was represented at the Eurovision Song Contest 2011 with the song "Jestem" written and performed by Magdalena Tul. The Polish broadcaster Telewizja Polska (TVP) organised the national final Krajowe Eliminacje 2011 in order to select the Polish entry for the 2011 contest in Düsseldorf, Germany. The national final took place on 14 February 2011 and featured ten entries. "Jestem" performed by Magdalena Tul was selected as the winner after gaining the most votes from the public with 59,984 votes.

Poland was drawn to compete in the first semi-finals of the Eurovision Song Contest which took place on 10 May 2011. Performing as the opening entry for the show in position 1, "Jestem" was not announced among the top 10 entries of the first semi-final and therefore did not qualify to compete in the final. It was later revealed that Poland placed nineteenth (last) out of the 19 participating countries in the semi-final with 18 points.

== Background ==
Prior to the 2011 contest, Poland had participated in the Eurovision Song Contest fifteen times since its first entry in 1994. Poland's highest placement in the contest, to this point, has been second place, which the nation achieved with its debut entry in 1994 with the song "To nie ja!" performed by Edyta Górniak. Poland has only, thus far, reached the top ten on one other occasion, when Ich Troje performing the song "Keine Grenzen – Żadnych granic" finished seventh in 2003. Between 2005 and 2010, Poland failed to qualify from the semi-final round five out of six years with only their 2008 entry, "For Life" performed by Isis Gee, managing to take the nation to the final during that period. They once again failed to qualify to the final in 2010 with their entry "Legenda" performed by Marcin Mroziński.

The Polish national broadcaster, Telewizja Polska (TVP), broadcasts the event within Poland and organises the selection process for the nation's entry. TVP confirmed Poland's participation in the 2011 Eurovision Song Contest on 3 November 2010. Since 2006, TVP organised televised national finals that featured a competition among several artists and songs in order to select the Polish entry for the Eurovision Song Contest, a selection procedure that continued for their 2011 entry.

== Before Eurovision ==
=== Krajowe Eliminacje 2011 ===
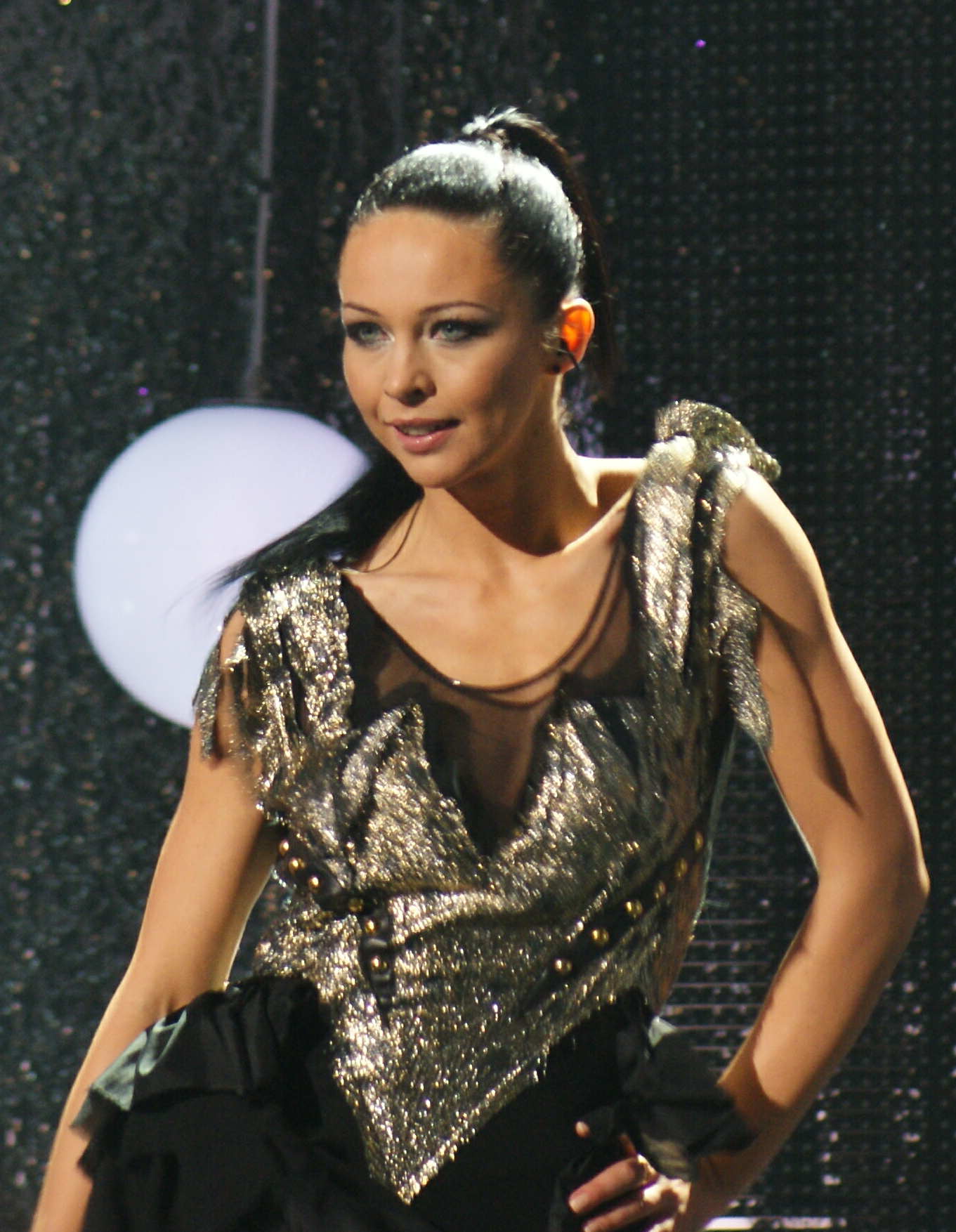
Magdalena Tul performing at Krajowe Eliminacje 2011

Krajowe Eliminacje 2011 was the national final organised by TVP in order to select the Polish entry for the Eurovision Song Contest 2011. The show took place on 14 February 2011 at the TVP Headquarters in Warsaw, hosted by Odeta Moro-Figurska and Krzysztof Kasowski. Public televoting exclusively selected the winner. The show was broadcast on TVP1, TVP HD and TVP Polonia as well as streamed online at the broadcaster's website tvp.pl.

==== Competing entries ====
TVP opened a submission period for interested artists and songwriters to submit their entries between 3 November 2010 and 21 December 2010. Only Polish artists and songwriters were eligible to compete. An eight-member selection committee selected five entries from the received submissions to compete in the national final, which were announced on 29 December 2010. The selection committee consisted of Piotr Klatt (musician, songwriter, journalist, music producer at TVP and artistic director of the Opole Festival), Maria Szabłowska (music journalist at TVP and Polish Radio), Krzysztof Szewczyk (music journalist at TVP and Polish Radio), Pawel Sztompke (journalist, music critic and editorial director of music at Polish Radio), Marek Sierocki (music journalist and artistic directors of the Opole Festival and Sopot Festival), Artur Orzech (Eurovision commentator, radio and television journalist and presenter), Mikołaj Dobrowolski (Assistant Head of Delegation for Poland at the Eurovision Song Contest) and Tomasz Deszczyński (President of OGAE Poland). TVP selected an additional six entries to compete as wildcards, which were announced between 18 and 21 January 2011.

On 18 January 2011, "Control", written by Mateusz Krautwurst and to have been performed by the Positive, was disqualified from the national final as the song had been released before 1 September 2010.

| Artist | Song | Songwriter(s) | Selection |
|---|---|---|---|
| Ada Fijał | "Hot Like Fire" | Victor Davies | TVP wildcard |
| Alizma | "Bow to the Bow" | Tex Richardson, Aleksandra Okapiec, Izabela Okapiec, Monika Okapiec | TVP wildcard |
| Anna Gogola | "Ktoś taki jak ty" | Romuald Lipko, Tomasz Zaliszewski | Open submission |
| Formuła RC | "Ja i ty (gdy zgasną swiatła)" | Robert Chojnacki | TVP wildcard |
| Ika | "Say" | Ania Rusowicz, Hubert Gasiul | TVP wildcard |
| Magdalena Tul | "Jestem" | Magdalena Tul | Open submission |
| Roan | "Maybe" | Tobiasz Staniszewski | Open submission |
| SheMoans | "Supergirl" | Krzysztof Pszona, Małgorzata Szpitun | Open submission |
| The Trash | "Things Go Better With Rock" | Piotr Konca, Radek Majdan, Sebastian Piekarek, Marcin Kliber, Radek Owczarz | TVP wildcard |
| ZoSia | "Scream Out Louder" | Zosia Karbowiak | TVP wildcard |

==== Final ====
The televised final took place on 14 February 2011. Ten entries competed and the winner, "Jestem" performed by Magdalena Tul, was determined entirely by a public vote. In addition to the performances of the competing entries, the band K.A.S.A. opened the show, while singers Juliusz Nyk, Patrycja Markowska and Stachursky, and the bands Blenders, Chemia and Renton performed as the interval acts.

Final – 14 February 2011
| R/O | Artist | Song | Televote | Place |
|---|---|---|---|---|
| 1 | Magdalena Tul | "Jestem" | 59,984 | 1 |
| 2 | SheMoans | "Supergirl" | 4,802 | 5 |
| 3 | Ada Fijał | "Hot Like Fire" | 4,451 | 6 |
| 4 | Alizma | "Bow to the Bow" | 17,212 | 3 |
| 5 | Ika | "Say" | 2,374 | 10 |
| 6 | Roan | "Maybe" | 2,968 | 8 |
| 7 | Anna Gogola | "Ktoś taki jak ty" | 30,444 | 2 |
| 8 | The Trash | "Things Go Better With Rock" | 6,013 | 4 |
| 9 | ZoSia | "Scream Out Louder" | 3,939 | 7 |
| 10 | Formuła RC | "Ja i ty (gdy zgasną swiatła)" | 2,549 | 9 |

=== Preparation ===
Following Magdalena Tul's win at Krajowe Eliminacje 2011, it was reported that the singer would perform the English language version of "Jestem", titled "First Class Ticket to Heaven" with lyrics by Tul herself together with Osmo Ikonen and Brian Allan, at the Eurovision Song Contest. This was later denied by TVP stating that the release of the English version was solely for promotion purposes and that the Polish language version would be performed at the contest, while Tul later revealed in 2019 that the English version had been withdrawn by her team due to conflicts with Allan.

== At Eurovision ==
According to Eurovision rules, all nations with the exceptions of the host country and the "Big Five" (France, Germany, Italy, Spain and the United Kingdom) are required to qualify from one of two semi-finals in order to compete for the final; the top ten countries from each semi-final progress to the final. The European Broadcasting Union (EBU) split up the competing countries into six different pots based on voting patterns from previous contests, with countries with favourable voting histories put into the same pot. On 17 January 2011, an allocation draw was held which placed each country into one of the two semi-finals, as well as which half of the show they would perform in. Poland was placed into the first semi-final, to be held on 10 May 2011, and was scheduled to perform in the first half of the show. The running order for the semi-finals was decided through another draw on 15 March 2011 and as one of the five wildcard countries, Poland chose to open the show and perform in position 1, before the entry from Norway.

The two semi-finals and the final were broadcast in Poland on TVP1 with commentary by Artur Orzech. The Polish spokesperson, who announced the Polish votes during the final, was Odeta Moro-Figurska.

=== Semi-final ===
Magdalena Tul took part in technical rehearsals on 1 and 5 May, followed by dress rehearsals on 9 and 10 May. This included the jury show on 9 May where the professional juries of each country watched and voted on the competing entries.

The Polish performance featured Magdalena Tul performing a choreographed routine in a white and silver costume, together with four female dancers dressed in white, two of them which also provided backing vocals. The stage LED screens displayed a disco style wall of flashing spotlights which alternate in blue and red colours. The performance also featured smoke and pyrotechnic flame effects. The stage costumes were designed by designer Kuba Bonecki, while the choreographer for the Polish performance was Michał Szuba. The backing performers that joined Tul on stage were: Anna Sochacka, Iga Turek, Joanna Gogolińska and Kalina Kasprzak. An additional male backing vocalist, Artur Bomert, was also part of the performance.

At the end of the show, Poland was not announced among the top 10 entries in the first semi-final and therefore failed to qualify to compete in the final. It was later revealed that Poland placed nineteenth (last) in the semi-final, receiving a total of 18 points.

=== Voting ===
Voting during the three shows consisted of 50 percent public televoting and 50 percent from a jury deliberation. The jury consisted of five music industry professionals who were citizens of the country they represent. This jury was asked to judge each contestant based on: vocal capacity; the stage performance; the song's composition and originality; and the overall impression by the act. In addition, no member of a national jury could be related in any way to any of the competing acts in such a way that they cannot vote impartially and independently. TVP originally selected the following members to form the Polish jury for the contest: Piotr Klatt (chairperson; musician), Maria Szabłowska (journalist), Marek Dutkiewicz (songwriter), Radzimir Dębski (composer and music producer) and Justyna Steczkowska (singer-songwriter, represented Poland in the 1995 contest); one of them was later replaced by Łukasz Zagrobelny (singer).

Following the release of the full split voting by the EBU after the conclusion of the competition, it was revealed that Poland had placed seventeenth with the public televote and eighteenth with the jury vote in the first semi-final. In the public vote, Poland scored 25 points, while with the jury vote, Poland scored 13 points.

Below is a breakdown of points awarded to Poland and awarded by Poland in the first semi-final and grand final of the contest. The nation awarded its 12 points to Lithuania in the semi-final and the final of the contest.

==== Points awarded to Poland ====
Points awarded to Poland (Semi-final 1)
| Score | Country |
|---|---|
| 12 points | |
| 10 points | |
| 8 points | |
| 7 points | |
| 6 points | |
| 5 points | United Kingdom |
| 4 points | Georgia; Hungary |
| 3 points | Norway |
| 2 points | Lithuania |
| 1 point | |

==== Points awarded by Poland ====
Points awarded by Poland (Semi-final 1)
| Score | Country |
|---|---|
| 12 points | Lithuania |
| 10 points | Finland |
| 8 points | Azerbaijan |
| 7 points | Greece |
| 6 points | Serbia |
| 5 points | Georgia |
| 4 points | Iceland |
| 3 points | Switzerland |
| 2 points | Armenia |
| 1 point | Norway |

Points awarded by Poland (Final)
| Score | Country |
|---|---|
| 12 points | Lithuania |
| 10 points | Italy |
| 8 points | Azerbaijan |
| 7 points | Georgia |
| 6 points | Serbia |
| 5 points | Finland |
| 4 points | Germany |
| 3 points | Denmark |
| 2 points | Ukraine |
| 1 point | Ireland |
