= Bulgaria in the Eurovision Song Contest 2011 =

- Eurovision Song Contest 2011
- Participating broadcaster: Bulgarian National Television (BNT)
- Country: Bulgaria
- Selection process: Bŭlgarskata pesen v „Evroviziya 2011”
- Selection date: 23 February 2011

Competing entry
- Song: "Na inat"
- Artist: Poli Genova
- Songwriters: Sebastian Arman; David Bronner; Poli Genova; Borislav Milanov

Placement
- Semi-final result: Failed to qualify (12th)

Participation chronology

Bulgaria was represented at the Eurovision Song Contest 2011 with the song "Na inat" written by Sebastian Arman, David Bronner, Poli Genova, and Borislav Milanov, and performed by Poli Genova herself. The Bulgarian participating broadcaster, Bulgarian National Television (BNT), organised the national final Bŭlgarskata pesen v „Evroviziya 2011” in order to select its entry for the contest. 19 entries were selected to participate in the national final, held on 23 February 2011, where "Na inat" performed by Poli Genova emerged as the winning entry following the combination of votes from a 55-member jury panel and a public televote.

Bulgaria was drawn to compete in the second semi-final of the Eurovision Song Contest which took place on 12 May 2011. Performing during the show in position 10, "Na inat" was not announced among the top 10 entries of the second semi-final and therefore did not qualify to compete in the final. It was later revealed that Bulgaria placed twelfth out of the 19 participating countries in the semi-final with 48 points.

== Background ==
Prior to the 2011 contest, Bulgarian National Television (BNT) had participated in the Eurovision Song Contest representing Bulgaria six times since its first entry in 2005. It achieved its best result in 2007 with the song "Water" performed by Elitsa Todorova and Stoyan Yankoulov, which placed fifth. To this point, their 2007 entry is also the only Bulgarian entry to have qualified to the Eurovision final; the nation had failed to qualify to the final with their other five entries. In 2010, "Angel si ti" by Miro failed to qualify to the final, making it the third consecutive qualification failure for the country.

As part of its duties as participating broadcaster, BNT organises the selection of its entry in the Eurovision Song Contest and broadcasts the event in the country. The broadcaster confirmed its participation in the 2011 contest on 3 December 2010. In the past, BNT had alternated between both internal selections and national finals in order to select its entry. For its 2010 entry, the broadcaster organised a national final to select both the artist and song.

== Before Eurovision ==
=== Bŭlgarskata pesen v „Evroviziya 2011” ===
Bŭlgarskata pesen v „Evroviziya 2011” (The Bulgarian song in Eurovision 2011) was the national final format developed by BNT which determined the artist and song that would represent Bulgaria at the Eurovision Song Contest 2011. The competition consisted of a final on 23 February 2011, held at the National Palace of Culture in Sofia. The show was hosted by Maria Ilieva and Orlin Pavlov and broadcast on BNT 1 as well as online via the broadcaster's website bnt.bg and the Eurovision Song Contest official website eurovision.tv.

==== Competing entries ====
A 55-member committee consisting of composers, poets, producers, performers, music educators, members of the media and advertising agencies, titled Academy, each received questionnaires to propose up to three performers for the national final. BNT also opened a submission period on 17 January 2011 for artists and songwriters to submit their entries until 9 February 2011. Songs were required to contain partial Bulgarian involvement. On 14 February 2011, the twenty-three artists and songs selected for the competition were announced. Thirteen of the entries came from the thirteen most nominated artists of the Academy, while the remaining ten entries were selected by the Academy from 19 entries received through the open submission. On 18 February 2011, the songs "Boogie Man" performed by Sunrise featuring All Access Project, "Wolf's Song" performed by Svetozar Hristov, "Believe" performed by Vessy and "Like a Fairytale" performed by Zhan Sheitanov were withdrawn from the competition.

Members of the Academy
Group	Members
Composers	Haygashod Aghasyan; Ivan Yankov; Andrey Drenikov; Lubomir Denev; Sasho Mladenov; Boris Karadimchev; Magomed Aliyev; Momchil Kolev; Kirill Bozhkov; Yasen Kozev
Poets	Nadia Popova; Petko Bratinov; Balcho Balchov; Nikolai Petev; Michail Belchev; Gergana Turiyska
Producers	Atanas Yankulov – Stars Records; Kirill Velichkov – Orpheus Music; Boris Bonchev – Toxity Records; Stanislava Armutlieva – Virginia Records; Stanislav Zahariev – Universal Music Bulgaria; Georgi Enchev – Select Music Media; Victor Kasamov – Ara Audio Video; Borislav Ivanchev – Vitality Music
Performers	Maria Ilieva; Elitsa Todorova; Kamelia Todorova; Irina Florin; Dani Milev; Beloslava; Vasil Gyurov; Lubomir Kirov; Angel Angelski
Music educators	Maria Ganeva; Milka Miteva; Toni Dimitrova Shekerdzhieva-Novak; Hristo Dipchikov; Maria Nikolova Dukanova; Stoyanka Filcheva Tenova-Ilchevska; Maria Lazarova Gradeshlieva
Media	Anna Maria Tonkova; Irina Bachvarova; Vladimir Daynov; Georgi Kostov; Alexander Kumanov; Angel Popov; Yuri Lazarov; Zdravko Petrov; Spas Shurulinkov; Nikolay Kanchev
Advertising agencies	Ilian Stoychev; Mariana Brashnarova; Nevena Aneva; Tanya Yordanova; Todor Kostadinov

Artist	Song	Songwriter(s)	Selection
5-te Sezona	"Take My Hand"	Plamen Stavrev, Stefan Diomov	Open submission
032	"On Air"	Rachel Row, Svetlin Kuslev, Georgi Simeonov	Academy nomination
Boyan Mihailov	"Nestinari" (Нестинари)	Plamen Bochev, Valeri Kostov	Academy nomination
D2	"Glorious Twist"	Dimitar Kanev, Rumen Gaidev	Academy nomination
Elmira Kostova	"Mome hubava" (Моме хубава)	Tsvetomir Tsvetanov	Open submission
Emiliya Valenti	"Plenyavash me" (Пленяваш ме)	Vasil Ivanov, Marios Gligoris	Open submission
Jakob	"Wicked Way of Love"	Petr Panov, Jacob Stadell, Peter Hägerås	Open submission
Jerihon	"Smile"	Martina Baldzhieva, Stoyan Bozov, Mihail Rusev, Boris Samarinov	Open submission
Lazar	"Zamestitel" (Заместител)	Lazar Kisyov	Academy nomination
Milena Slavova	"Fire in My Hair"	Milena Slavova	Academy nomination
Mona	"Teen Life"	Rachel Row, Maria Ilieva, Georgi Yanev	Academy nomination
Plamena Petrova	"Bez teb" (Без теб)	Grigor Koprov, Ivan Tenev, Alexander Petrov	Open submission
Poli Genova	"Na inat" (На инат)	Sebastian Arman, Borislav Milanov, David Bronner, Poli Genova	Academy nomination
Ruth Koleva	"Fever"	Rachel Row, KiNK	Academy nomination
Stanny Brown feat. N.A.S.O.	"I Know"	Stanny Brown, Alex Nushev, N.A.S.O.	Open submission
The Sprint and Simona Sivanio	"The New Earth"	Evgeny Simeonov, Simona Sivanio	Open submission
Tsvetelina Chendova	"Luxury Hotel"	Bastien Gaisne	Academy nomination
Vlado Dimov	"Syanka" (Сянка)	Svetozar Hristov, Veselin Kalchev, Lora Konstantinova	Academy nomination
Wickeda	"Blue Cotton Levi's"	Erol Ibrahimov	Academy nomination

==== Final ====
The final took place on 23 February 2011. Nineteen entries competed and "Na inat" performed by Poli Genova was selected as the winner by the 50/50 combination of votes awarded by public televoting and the Academy. In addition to the performances of the competing entries, guest performers were Dirty Purchase, Rumanetza and Enchev, Tri O Five, 2007 Bulgarian Junior Eurovision entrant Bon-Bon and 2011 Romanian Eurovision entrant Hotel FM.

Final – 23 February 2011
R/O	Artist	Song	Jury	Televote	Total	Place
1	Wickeda	"Blue Cotton Levi's"	3	—	—	—
2	Plamena Petrova	"Bez teb"	0	—	—	—
3	032	"On Air"	0	—	—	—
4	The Sprint and Simona Sivanio	"The New Earth"	3	—	—	—
5	Vlado Dimov	"Syanka"	0	—	—	—
6	Ruth Koleva	"Fever"	6	—	—	—
7	Jerihon	"Smile"	10	—	—	—
8	Elmira Kostova	"Mome hubava"	0	—	—	—
9	5-te Sezona	"Take My Hand"	2	—	—	—
10	Mona	"Teen Life"	8	5	13	3
11	D2	"Glorious Twist"	7	—	—	—
12	Lazar	"Zamestitel"	4	—	—	—
13	Tsvetelina Chendova	"Luxury Hotel"	0	—	—	—
14	Stanny Brown feat. N.A.S.O.	"I Know"	0	—	—	—
15	Poli Genova	"Na inat"	12	12	24	1
16	Boyan Mihailov	"Nestinari"	0	—	—	—
17	Milena Slavova	"Fire in My Hair"	5	10	15	2
18	Jakob	"Wicked Way of Love"	1	8	9	—
19	Emiliya Valenti	"Plenyavash me"	0	—	—	—

=== Promotion ===
Poli Genova made several appearances across Europe to specifically promote "Na inat" as the Bulgarian Eurovision entry. On 26 February, Genova performed "Na inat" during the Moldovan Eurovision national final. Genova also performed the song during the Greek Eurovision national final on 2 March. On 19 March, Genova performed during the TVR 1 show Ne vedem la TVR in Romania. On 14 April, Genova performed during the Eurovision in Concert event which was held at the Club Air venue in Amsterdam, Netherlands and hosted by Cornald Maas, Esther Hart and Sascha Korf. On 17 April, Genova performed during the London Eurovision Party, which was held at the Shadow Lounge venue in London, United Kingdom and hosted by Nicki French and Paddy O'Connell.

== At Eurovision ==
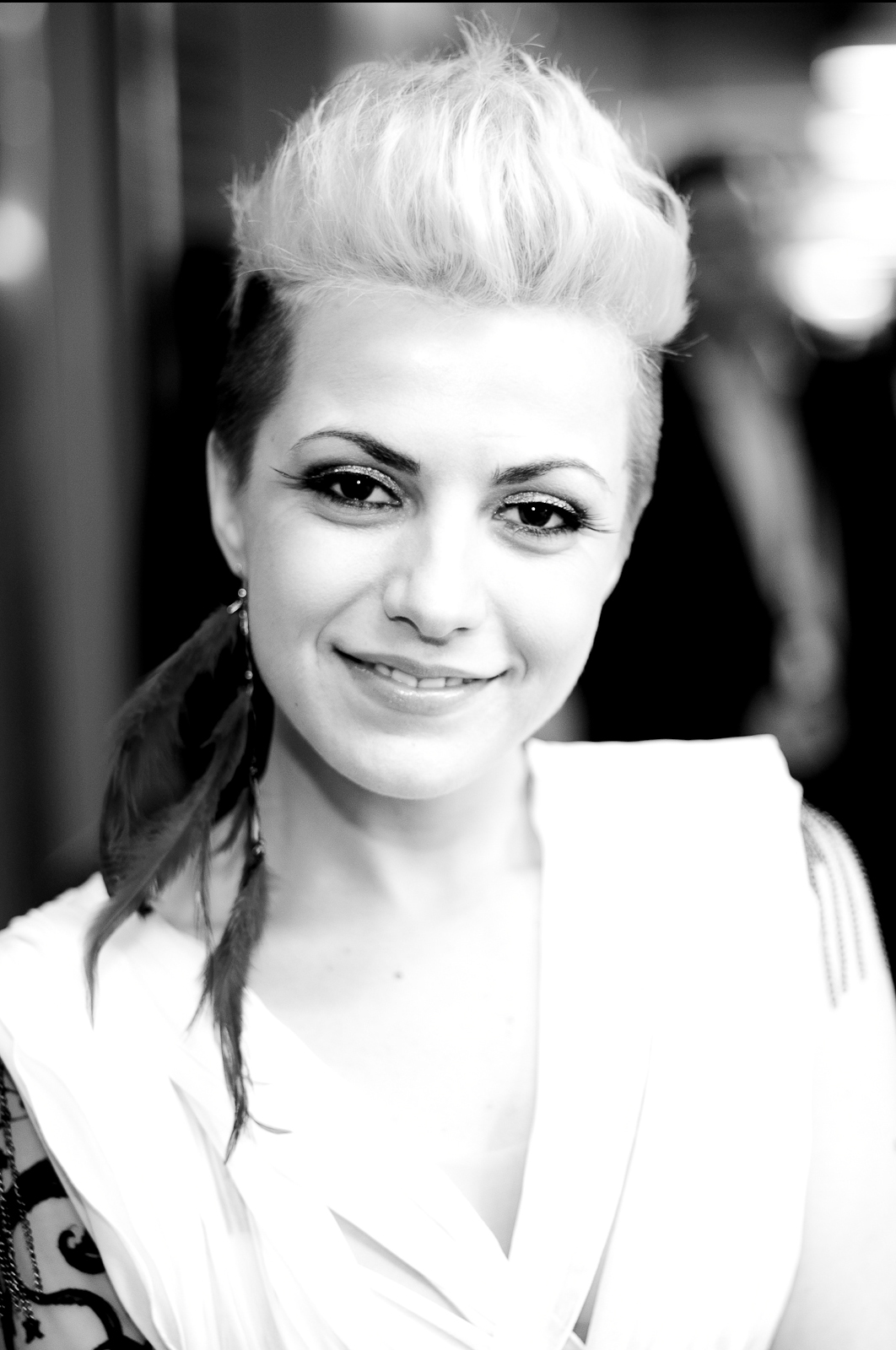
Poli Genova at the Eurovision Song Contest 2011

All countries except the "Big Five" (France, Germany, Italy, Spain and the United Kingdom), and the host country, are required to qualify from one of two semi-finals in order to compete for the final; the top ten countries from each semi-final progress to the final. The European Broadcasting Union (EBU) split up the competing countries into six different pots based on voting patterns from previous contests, with countries with favourable voting histories put into the same pot. On 17 January 2011, a special allocation draw was held which placed each country into one of the two semi-finals, as well as which half of the show they would perform in. Bulgaria was placed into the second semi-final, to be held on 12 May 2011, and was scheduled to perform in the second half of the show. The running order for the semi-finals was decided through another draw on 15 March 2011 and Bulgaria was set to perform in position 10, following the entry from Cyprus and before the entry from Macedonia.

The two semi-finals and the final were broadcast in Bulgaria on BNT 1 with commentary by Elena Rosberg and Georgi Kushvaliev. The Bulgarian spokesperson, who announced the Bulgarian votes during the final, was Maria Ilieva.

=== Semi-final ===
Poli Genova took part in technical rehearsals on 4 and 7 May, followed by dress rehearsals on 11 and 12 May. This included the jury show on 11 May where the professional juries of each country watched and voted on the competing entries.

The Bulgarian performance featured Poli Genova performing in a white dress which she stripped a part off during the last chorus. Genova began the performance kneeling down and made use of the satellite stage at the end. The performance also featured the use of a wind machine. The LED screens transitioned from an image of water dripping against glass to heavy rain falling on water. Three guitarists, a pianist and a drummer joined Poli Genova on stage: Desislava Hristova, Dimitar Balev, Elizabeth Nesheva, Martin Hafizi and Yana Baleva.

At the end of the show, Bulgaria was not announced among the top 10 entries in the second semi-final and therefore failed to qualify to compete in the final. It was later revealed that Bulgaria placed twelfth in the semi-final, receiving a total of 48 points.

=== Voting ===
Voting during the three shows consisted of 50 percent public televoting and 50 percent from a jury deliberation. The jury consisted of five music industry professionals who were citizens of the country they represent. This jury was asked to judge each contestant based on: vocal capacity; the stage performance; the song's composition and originality; and the overall impression by the act. In addition, no member of a national jury could be related in any way to any of the competing acts in such a way that they cannot vote impartially and independently.

Following the release of the full split voting by the EBU after the conclusion of the competition, it was revealed that the Bulgaria had placed fourteenth with the public televote and twelfth with the jury vote in the second semi-final. In the public vote, Bulgaria scored 43 points, while with the jury vote, Bulgaria scored 59 points.

Below is a breakdown of points awarded to Bulgaria and awarded by Bulgaria in the second semi-final and grand final of the contest. The nation awarded its 12 points to Denmark in the semi-final and to the United Kingdom in the final of the contest.

==== Points awarded to Bulgaria ====
Points awarded to Bulgaria (Semi-final 2)
Score	Country
12 points	
10 points	Cyprus; Italy
8 points	
7 points	
6 points	
5 points	Moldova
4 points	Denmark; Germany; Slovenia
3 points	France
2 points	Austria; Netherlands
1 point	Belgium; Ireland; Macedonia; Sweden

==== Points awarded by Bulgaria ====
Points awarded by Bulgaria (Semi-final 2)
Score	Country
12 points	Denmark
10 points	Austria
8 points	Slovenia
7 points	Ireland
6 points	Belgium
5 points	Netherlands
4 points	Estonia
3 points	Ukraine
2 points	Moldova
1 point	Romania

Points awarded by Bulgaria (Final)
Score	Country
12 points	United Kingdom
10 points	Greece
8 points	Ukraine
7 points	Denmark
6 points	Romania
5 points	Austria
4 points	Russia
3 points	Ireland
2 points	Bosnia and Herzegovina
1 point	Georgia
