= Georgia in the Eurovision Song Contest 2011 =

- Eurovision Song Contest 2011
- Participating broadcaster: Georgian Public Broadcaster (GPB)
- Country: Georgia
- Selection process: National final
- Selection date: 19 February 2011

Competing entry
- Song: "One More Day"
- Artist: Eldrine
- Songwriters: DJ BE$$; DJ Rock; Mikheil Chelidze

Placement
- Semi-final result: Qualified (6th, 74 points)
- Final result: 9th, 110 points

Participation chronology

Georgia was represented at the Eurovision Song Contest 2011 with the song "One More Day", written by DJ BE$$, DJ Rock, and Mikheil Chelidze, and performed by the band Eldrine. The Georgian participating broadcaster, Georgian Public Broadcaster (GPB), held a national final in order to select its entry for the contest. An open call for submissions was held which resulted in the shortlisting of seven entries that were presented to the public during a televised production on 19 February 2011. The results of a public televote combined with the votes of an expert jury resulted in the selection of "One More Day" performed by Eldrine as the Georgian entry.

Georgia was drawn to compete in the first semi-final of the Eurovision Song Contest which took place on 10 May 2011. Performing during the show in position 9, "One More Day" was announced among the top 10 entries of the first semi-final and therefore qualified to compete in the final on 14 May. It was later revealed that Georgia placed sixth out of the 19 participating countries in the semi-final with 74 points. In the final, Georgia was the closing performance of the show in position 25, placing ninth out of the 25 participating countries with 110 points.

== Background ==
Prior to the 2011 contest, Georgia had participated in the Eurovision Song Contest three times since their first entry in 2007. The nation's highest placing in the contest, to this point, has been ninth place, which was achieved in 2010 with the song "Shine" performed by Sofia Nizharadze. The nation briefly withdrew from the contest in 2009 after the European Broadcasting Union (EBU) rejected the Georgian entry, "We Don't Wanna Put In", for perceived political references to Vladimir Putin who was the Russian Prime Minister at the time. The withdrawal and fallout was tied to tense relations between Georgia and then host country Russia, which stemmed from the 2008 Russo-Georgian War. Following the introduction of semi-finals, Georgia has managed to qualify to the final on each occasion the nation has participated in.

The Georgian national broadcaster, Georgian Public Broadcaster (GPB), broadcasts the event within Georgia and organises the selection process for the nation's entry. GPB confirmed their intentions to participate at the 2011 Eurovision Song Contest on 3 December 2010. Georgia has traditionally selected their entry for the Eurovision Song Contest via a national final, a method which was continued for their 2011 participation.

== Before Eurovision ==
=== National final ===
GPB opened a public submission from 20 January 2011 until 10 February 2011. Songs were required to be performed in either English or Georgian. 50 entries were received by the submission deadline and an expert commission selected the top ten songs from the received submissions, which were announced on 11 February 2011. On 13 February 2011, "Universe" performed by Boris Bedia and "Maybe" performed by Keti Orjonikidze were withdrawn from the competition, while Tako Gachechiladze withdrew her song "It's OK" on 18 February 2011 due to health problems. The seven remaining entries were presented to the public via a special programme on 19 February 2011 at the GPB studios in Tbilisi, hosted by Temo Kvirkvelia and broadcast on the GPB First Channel as well as online at the broadcaster's website 1tv.ge. The winner, "One More Day" performed by Eldrine, was determined upon by the 50/50 combination of the votes of an expert jury and a public televote. In addition to the performances of the competing entries, 2007 Georgian Eurovision entrant Sopho Khalvashi and 2010 Georgian Eurovision entrant Sofia Nizharadze performed as guests.

Final – 19 February 2011
R/O	Artist	Song	Songwriter(s)	Place
1	Temo Sajaia	"Jarisk'atsis simghera" (ჯარისკაცის სიმღერა)	Dato Porchkhidze, Rati Amaglobeli	—
2	Salome Korkotashvili	"Love"	Levan Svanishvili, Salome Korkotashvili	3
3	Sweet Pills	"Face to Face"	Zura Makhniashvili, Mari Manjavidze, Tako Jordania	—
4	Dito Lagvilava and November	"Am axal dghes" (ამ ახალ დღეს)	Lasha Mikautadze, Davit Mchedlishvili, Dito Lagvilava	—
5	Nini Shermadini	"Rejected"	Leonidas Chantzaras, Peter Ries, Paulini Curuenavuli	2
6	The Georgians	"Loved, Seen, Dreaming"	Giorgi Amashukeli	—
7	Eldrine	"One More Day"	DJ BE$$, DJ Rock, Mikheil Chelidze	1

=== Preparation ===
On 28 February 2011, the production company of Eldrine, Titani, announced that Tako Vadachkoria had been replaced by Sopho Toroshelidze as the band's lead singer. On 12 March, the final version of "One More Day" premiered together with the music video, filmed at the Rustaveli Theatre in Tbilisi and directed by Temo Kvirkvelia and Tornike Katsitadze.

== At Eurovision ==
According to Eurovision rules, all nations with the exceptions of the host country and the "Big Five" (France, Germany, Italy, Spain and the United Kingdom) are required to qualify from one of two semi-finals in order to compete for the final; the top ten countries from each semi-final progress to the final. The European Broadcasting Union (EBU) split up the competing countries into six different pots based on voting patterns from previous contests, with countries with favourable voting histories put into the same pot. On 17 January 2011, a special allocation draw was held which placed each country into one of the two semi-finals, as well as which half of the show they would perform in. Georgia was placed into the first semi-final, to be held on 10 May 2011, and was scheduled to perform in the first half of the show.

Both the semi-finals and the final were broadcast in Georgia on the GPB First Channel with commentary by Sopho Altunashvili. The Georgian spokesperson, who announced the Georgian votes during the final, was lead singer of 2010 Georgian contest entrant Sofia Nizharadze.

=== Semi-final ===
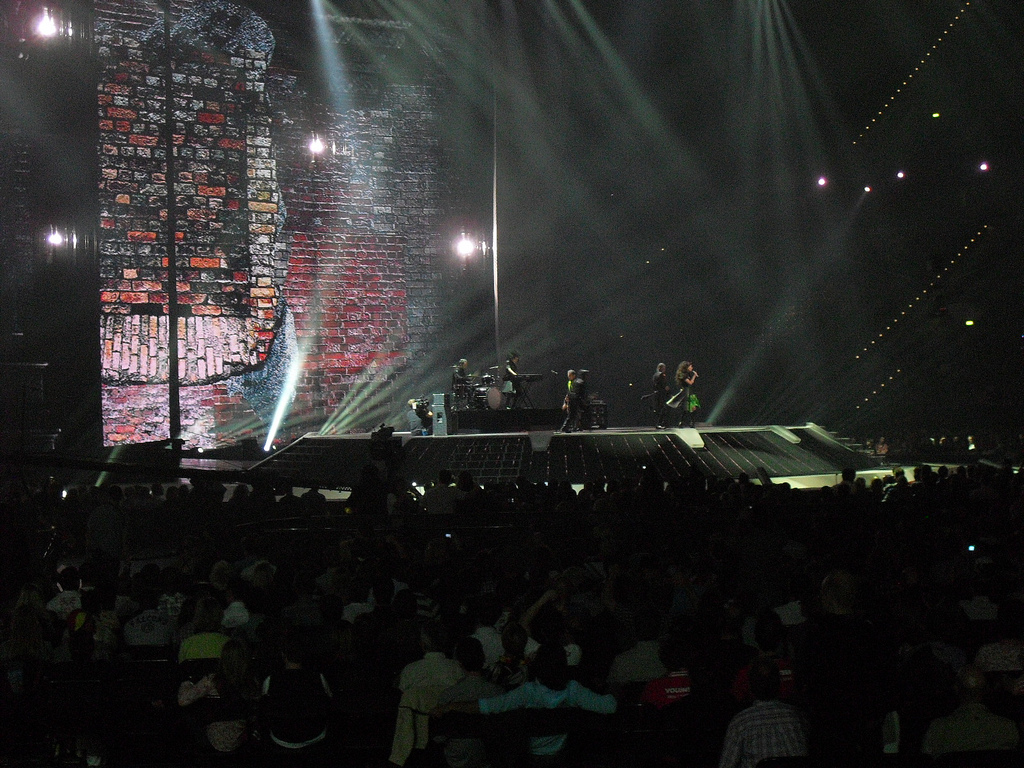
Eldrine during a rehearsal before the first semi-final

Eldrine took part in technical rehearsals on 1 and 5 May, followed by dress rehearsals on 9 and 10 May. This included the jury final on 9 May where the professional juries of each country watched and voted on the competing entries.

The Georgian performance featured the members of Eldrine performing in a band set-up dressed in black coats with colourful decorations designed by Georgian designer Nino Chubinishvili. The stage included flickering lights on the LED screens which projected a falling brick wall and golden ornaments. The performance also featured pyrotechnic effects and the use of a wind machine. The staging director for the Georgian performance was Pascal Jourdan.

At the end of the show, Georgia was announced as having finished in the top 10 and subsequently qualifying for the grand final. It was later revealed that Georgia placed sixth in the semi-final, receiving a total of 74 points.

=== Final ===
Shortly after the first semi-final, a winners' press conference was held for the ten qualifying countries. As part of this press conference, the qualifying artists took part in a draw to determine the running order for the final. This draw was done in the order the countries were announced during the semi-final. Georgia was drawn to perform last in position 25, following the entry from Serbia.

Eldrine once again took part in dress rehearsals on 13 and 14 May before the final, including the jury final where the professional juries cast their final votes before the live show. The band performed a repeat of their semi-final performance during the final on 14 May. Georgia placed ninth in the final, scoring 110 points.

=== Voting ===
Voting during the three shows consisted of 50 percent public televoting and 50 percent from a jury deliberation. The jury consisted of five music industry professionals who were citizens of the country they represent. This jury was asked to judge each contestant based on: vocal capacity; the stage performance; the song's composition and originality; and the overall impression by the act. In addition, no member of a national jury could be related in any way to any of the competing acts in such a way that they cannot vote impartially and independently.

Following the release of the full split voting by the EBU after the conclusion of the competition, it was revealed that Georgia had placed eighth with the public televote and sixteenth with the jury vote in the final. In the public vote, Georgia scored 138 points, while with the jury vote, Georgia scored 79 points. In the first semi-final, Georgia placed fifth with the public televote with 90 points and thirteenth with the jury vote, scoring 51 points.

Below is a breakdown of points awarded to Georgia and awarded by Georgia in the first semi-final and grand final of the contest. The nation awarded its 12 points to Azerbaijan in the semi-final and to Lithuania in the final of the contest.

==== Points awarded to Georgia ====
Points awarded to Georgia (Semi-final 1)
Score	Country
12 points	Lithuania
10 points	Greece; Turkey
8 points	Armenia; Azerbaijan; Malta
7 points	
6 points	
5 points	Poland; Russia
4 points	Serbia
3 points	
2 points	San Marino
1 point	Finland; Hungary

Points awarded to Georgia (Final)
Score	Country
12 points	Belarus; Lithuania; Ukraine
10 points	Armenia; Azerbaijan
8 points	Greece; Turkey
7 points	Moldova; Poland; San Marino
6 points	Russia
5 points	Hungary
4 points	
3 points	Estonia
2 points	Israel
1 point	Bulgaria

==== Points awarded by Georgia ====
Points awarded by Georgia (Semi-final 1)
Score	Country
12 points	Azerbaijan
10 points	Lithuania
8 points	Armenia
7 points	Greece
6 points	Malta
5 points	Russia
4 points	Poland
3 points	Turkey
2 points	Portugal
1 point	San Marino

Points awarded by Georgia (Final)
Score	Country
12 points	Lithuania
10 points	Ukraine
8 points	Azerbaijan
7 points	Italy
6 points	Greece
5 points	Moldova
4 points	Russia
3 points	Austria
2 points	France
1 point	Sweden
