= Armenia in the Eurovision Song Contest 2011 =

- Eurovision Song Contest 2011
- Participating broadcaster: Public Television of Armenia (AMPTV)
- Country: Armenia
- Selection process: Artist: Internal selection Song: Evrotesil 2011
- Selection date: Artist: 11 December 2010; Song: 5 March 2011

Competing entry
- Song: "Boom Boom"
- Artist: Emmy
- Songwriters: Hayk Hovhannisyan; Hayk Harutyunyan; Sosi Khanikyan

Placement
- Semi-final result: Failed to qualify (12th)

Participation chronology

Armenia was represented at the Eurovision Song Contest 2011 with the song "Boom Boom" written by Hayk Hovhannisyan, Hayk Harutyunyan and Sosi Khanikyan. The song was performed by Emmy, who was selected internally by the Armenian broadcaster Public Television of Armenia (AMPTV) to represent Armenia in the 2011 contest in Düsseldorf, Germany. Emmy's selection as the Armenian artist was announced on 11 December 2010, while the song was selected through a national final, which took place on 5 March 2011 where four songs competed. "Boom Boom" was selected as the winning song following the combination of votes from a professional jury and a public televote.

Armenia was drawn to compete in the first semi-final of the Eurovision Song Contest which took place on 10 May 2011. Performing during the show in position 4, "Boom Boom" was not announced among the top 10 entries of the first semi-final and therefore did not qualify to compete in the final. This marked the first time that Armenia failed to qualify to the final of the Eurovision Song Contest from a semi-final since its first entry in 2006. It was later revealed that Armenia placed twelfth out of the 19 participating countries in the semi-final with 54 points.

== Background ==
Prior to the 2011 contest, Armenia had participated in the Eurovision Song Contest five times since its first entry in 2006. Since 2006, all of Armenia's entries have featured in the final. Its highest placing in the contest, to this point, has been fourth place, which the nation achieved in 2008 with the song "Qélé, Qélé" performed by Sirusho. In 2010, "Apricot Stone" performed by Eva Rivas placed seventh in the final.

The Armenian national broadcaster, Public Television of Armenia (AMPTV), broadcasts the event within Armenia and organises the selection process for the nation's entry. AMPTV confirmed their intentions to participate at the 2011 Eurovision Song Contest on 19 June 2010. Armenia has used various methods to select the Armenian entry in the past, such as a live televised national final to choose the performer, song or both to compete at Eurovision. However internal selections have also been held on occasion. The broadcaster organized a national final to select both the 2009 and 2010 Armenian entries. The broadcaster opted to internally select the artist for the 2011 contest, with a national final being organized to select the song.

== Before Eurovision ==
=== Artist selection ===
The Armenian representative for the Eurovision Song Contest 2011 was internally selected by the Art Council of AMPTV. During a press conference on 11 December 2010, Emmy was announced as the Armenian entrant. Emmy had previously attempted to represent Armenia at the Eurovision Song Contest by competing in the national finals in 2007 with the song "You've Done It" and in 2010 together with Mihran with the song "Hey (Let Me Hear You Say)" which placed second. During the press conference, the broadcaster announced that a national final would be held to select her song.

=== Evrotesil 2011 ===
Following their artist reveal, AMPTV announced a public call for song submissions in English or Armenian with a deadline of 23 January 2011. 70 songs were submitted by songwriters worldwide and a jury panel together with Emmy selected four songs from fifteen under consideration to proceed to the national final, which were announced on 21 February 2011. The national final took place on 5 March 2011 at the AMPTV studios in Yerevan, hosted by Gohar Gasparyan and Khoren Levonyan and broadcast on Armenia 1 as well as online via the official Eurovision Song Contest website eurovision.tv. All four competing songs were performed by Emmy and the winning song, "Boom Boom", was selected by the 50/50 combination of votes from a professional jury and a public vote. In addition to the performances of the competing songs, the show was opened by Armenian 2010 Junior Eurovision winner Vladimir Arzumanyan with "Mama", while the interval acts featured Armenian Eurovision 2006 entrant André, Armenian Eurovision 2007 entrant Hayko and Avraam Russo with their recently released songs.

Evrotesil 2011 – 5 March 2011
R/O	Song	Songwriter(s)	Jury	Televote		Total	Place
R/O	Song	Songwriter(s)	Jury	Votes	Points	Total	Place
1	"Hi"	Vahram Petrosyan, Mariam Shahinyan	8	1,535	8	16	3
2	"Boom Boom"	Hayk Hovhannisyan, Hayk Harutyunyan, Sosi Khanikyan	12	3,219	12	24	1
3	"Ayo" (Այո)	DerHova	10	2,422	10	20	2
4	"Goodbye"	Martin Kesici	7	539	7	14	4

==== Reception ====
A large number of Armenian and foreign Eurovision fans expressed dissatisfaction with results of the national final, as most polls previously conducted on internal portals and websites preferred the song "Ayo" which ultimately placed second. Several viewers claimed that their votes sent for "Ayo" during the show were not successfully registered, and a group of Armenian Eurovision fans as well as online users launched protests and petitions demanding AMPTV to cancel the results of the selection. It was also claimed that "Boom Boom" had copied the song "Indiyskoye disko" by Russian singer Jasmin. In response to these allegations, Armenian Head of Delegation for the Eurovision Song Contest Gohar Gasparyan stated: "The decision to hold a rally against the selection of the song 'Boom Boom' for Eurovision 2011 is purposeless, as the song has already been selected. If someone does not like this song, it does not mean that it will not be presented at Eurovision."

=== Promotion ===
To promote the entry, Emmy filmed a music video for "Boom Boom" in Yerevan and Berlin, which was directed by Hrant Yeritskinyan and featured Armenian boxer Arthur Abraham. The video was presented to the public during a special presentation programme on 9 April 2011. Emmy also made several appearances across Europe to specifically promote "Boom Boom" as the Armenian Eurovision entry. On 3 April, Emmy performed during the Armenia Tashir Awards which was held in Moscow, Russia. On 14 April, Emmy performed during the Eurovision in Concert event which was held at the Club Air venue in Amsterdam, Netherlands and hosted by Cornald Maas, Esther Hart and Sascha Korf. In addition to her international appearances, Emmy completed promotional activities in Armenia where she performed during the National Music Awards on 27 March and the Armenia Music Awards on 18 April.

== At Eurovision ==
All countries except the "Big Five" (France, Germany, Italy, Spain and the United Kingdom), and the host country, are required to qualify from one of two semi-finals in order to compete for the final; the top ten countries from each semi-final progress to the final. The European Broadcasting Union (EBU) split up the competing countries into six different pots based on voting patterns from previous contests, with countries with favourable voting histories put into the same pot. On 17 January 2011, a special allocation draw was held which placed each country into one of the two semi-finals, as well as which half of the show they would perform in. Armenia was placed into the first semi-final, to be held on 10 May 2011, and was scheduled to perform in the first half of the show. The running order for the semi-finals was decided through another draw on 15 March 2011 and Armenia was set to perform in position 4, following the entry from Albania and before the entry from Turkey.

In Armenia, the two semi-finals and the final were broadcast on Armenia 1 with commentary by Artak Vardanyan. The Armenian spokesperson, who announced the Armenian votes during the final, was Lusine Tovmasyan.

=== Semi-final ===
Emmy took part in technical rehearsals on 1 and 5 May, followed by dress rehearsals on 9 and 10 May. This included the jury show on 9 May where the professional juries of each country watched and voted on the competing entries.

The Armenian performance featured Emmy performing on stage together with four backing vocalists/dancers. The stage presentation began with Emmy dressed in a red coat and appearing from a giant revolving red glove with her name on. The coat was removed to reveal a white and silver mini-dress with a silver boxing belt designed by Arevik Simonyan. During the performance, the backing performers surrounded Emmy by creating a box ring with elastic belts. The performance also included pyrotechnic effects. The LED screens projected rotating and pulsating blue stars which later transitioned to red colours. The stage director and choreographer for the Armenian performance was Emy Armine Zaryan. The backing performers that joined Emmy on stage were: Charalampos Christodoulou, Charis Savvas, Jenia Evgenios Buli and Petros Zlatkos. Zaryan was also part of the performance as an additional backing vocalist.

At the end of the show, Armenia was not announced among the top 10 entries in the first semi-final and therefore failed to qualify to compete in the final. This marked the first time that Armenia failed to qualify to the final of the Eurovision Song Contest from a semi-final since its first entry in 2006. It was later revealed that Armenia placed twelfth in the semi-final, receiving a total of 54 points.

=== Voting ===
Voting during the three shows consisted of 50 percent public televoting and 50 percent from a jury deliberation. The jury consisted of five music industry professionals who were citizens of the country they represent. This jury was asked to judge each contestant based on: vocal capacity; the stage performance; the song's composition and originality; and the overall impression by the act. In addition, no member of a national jury could be related in any way to any of the competing acts in such a way that they cannot vote impartially and independently.

Following the release of the full split voting by the EBU after the conclusion of the competition, it was revealed that Armenia had placed seventh with the public televote and fifteenth with the jury vote in the first semi-final. In the public vote, Armenia scored 75 points, while with the jury vote, Armenia scored 33 points.

Below is a breakdown of points awarded to Armenia and awarded by Armenia in the first semi-final and grand final of the contest. The nation awarded its 12 points to Russia in the semi-final and to Ukraine in the final of the contest.

==== Points awarded to Armenia ====
Points awarded to Armenia (Semi-final 1)
Score	Country
12 points	
10 points	
8 points	Georgia; Greece; Russia
7 points	Malta; San Marino; Turkey
6 points	
5 points	
4 points	Iceland
3 points	Spain
2 points	Poland
1 point	

==== Points awarded by Armenia ====
Points awarded by Armenia (Semi-final 1)
Score	Country
12 points	Russia
10 points	Greece
8 points	Georgia
7 points	Malta
6 points	Finland
5 points	San Marino
4 points	Lithuania
3 points	Switzerland
2 points	Iceland
1 point	Norway

Points awarded by Armenia (Final)
Score	Country
12 points	Ukraine
10 points	Georgia
8 points	Russia
7 points	Greece
6 points	Italy
5 points	France
4 points	Sweden
3 points	Austria
2 points	United Kingdom
1 point	Serbia
