= Belarus in the Eurovision Song Contest 2011 =

- Eurovision Song Contest 2011
- Participating broadcaster: Belarusian Television and Radio Company (BTRC)
- Country: Belarus
- Selection process: Internal selection
- Announcement date: Artist: 28 February 2011; Song: 14 March 2011

Competing entry
- Song: "I Love Belarus"
- Artist: Anastasia Vinnikova
- Songwriters: Evgeny Oleynik; Svetlana Geraskova

Placement
- Semi-final result: Failed to qualify (14th)

Participation chronology

Belarus was represented at the Eurovision Song Contest 2011 with the song "I Love Belarus", written by Evgeny Oleynik and Svetlana Geraskova, and performed by Anastasia Vinnikova. The Belarusian participating broadcaster, Belarusian Television and Radio Company (BTRC), internally selected its entry for the contest. Anastasia Vinnikova and the song "Born in Byelorussia" were initially announced as the Belarusian entry on 28 February 2011, however the song was reworked and retitled as "I Am Belarusian". The song was later disqualified and the replacement entry, "I Love Belarus", was announced on 14 March 2011.

Belarus was drawn to compete in the second semi-final of the Eurovision Song Contest which took place on 12 May 2011. Performing during the show in position 16, "I Love Belarus" was not announced among the top 10 entries of the second semi-final and therefore did not qualify to compete in the final. It was later revealed that Belarus placed fourteenth out of the 19 participating countries in the semi-final with 45 points.

== Background ==
Prior to the 2011 contest, Belarusian Television and Radio Company (BTRC) had participated in the Eurovision Song Contest representing Belarus seven times since its first entry in 2004. Its best placing in the contest was sixth, achieved in 2007 with the song "Work Your Magic" performed by Koldun. Following the introduction of semi-finals for the 2004 contest, Belarus had only managed to qualify to the final two times. In 2010, "Butterflies" performed by 3+2 featuring Robert Wells qualified to the final and placed twenty-fourth.

As part of its duties as participating broadcaster, BTRC organises the selection of its entry in the Eurovision Song Contest and broadcasts the event in the country. The broadcaster has used both internal selections and national finals to select its entry for the contest in the past. In 2010, BTRC has organised an internal selection in order to choose the entry, a selection procedure that continued for its 2011 entry.

== Before Eurovision ==
=== Internal selection ===
Despite reports by Serbian newspaper Blic that Irina Dorofeeva had been internally selected to represent Belarus at the Eurovision Song Contest 2011 with a song written by Željko Joksimović, who represented Serbia and Montenegro in 2004, BTRC opened a submission period where artists and composers were able to submit their applications and entries to the broadcaster between 25 January 2011 and 21 February 2011. At the closing of the deadline, 29 entries were received by the broadcaster, of which 22 were valid. Among the artists that had submitted entries were Aura, E.V.A., Katya Langer, Lena Voloshina, Marat Gringauz and Zhnyuv.

A jury panel consisting of representatives of BTRC, ONT and CTV was tasked with evaluating the received entries and "Born in Byelorussia" performed by Anastasia Vinnikova was announced as the Belarusian entry for the Eurovision Song Contest 2011 on 28 February 2011. The song, which was written by Evgeny Oleynik, Svetlana Geraskova and Viktor Rudenko, had previously participated in the third season of the ONT music competition Musical Court where it failed to qualify to the final. On 3 March 2011, BTRC announced that the song had undergone lyrical changes and was retitled as "I Am Belarusian".

==== Disqualification and replacement ====
On 12 March 2011, BTRC announced that "I Am Belarusian" had been disqualified as the song had been publicly performed by Anastasia Vinnikova during a concert in May 2010. The replacement song, "I Love Belarus" written by Evgeny Oleynik and Svetlana Geraskova, was presented to the public via the release of the official music video, directed by Alexander Potapov and filmed at the "Belarusfilm" studio in Minsk, on 14 March 2011.

=== Promotion ===
Anastasia Vinnikova specifically promoted "I Love Belarus" as the Belarusian Eurovision entry on 14 April 2011 by performing during the Eurovision in Concert event which was held at the Club Air venue in Amsterdam, Netherlands and hosted by Cornald Maas, Esther Hart and Sascha Korf.

== At Eurovision ==
According to Eurovision rules, all nations with the exceptions of the host country and the "Big Five" (France, Germany, Italy, Spain and the United Kingdom) are required to qualify from one of two semi-finals in order to compete for the final; the top ten countries from each semi-final progress to the final. The European Broadcasting Union (EBU) split up the competing countries into six different pots based on voting patterns from previous contests, with countries with favourable voting histories put into the same pot. On 17 January 2011, a special allocation draw was held which placed each country into one of the two semi-finals. Belarus was placed into the second semi-final, to be held on 12 May 2011. The running order for the semi-finals was decided through another draw on 15 March 2011 and Belarus was set to perform in position 16, following the entry from Estonia and before the entry from Latvia.

The two semi-finals and the final were broadcast in Belarus on Belarus 1 with commentary by Denis Kurian. BTRC appointed Leila Ismailava as its spokesperson to announce the Belarusian votes during the final.

=== Semi-final ===
Anastasia Vinnikova took part in technical rehearsals on 4 and 8 May, followed by dress rehearsals on 11 and 12 May. This included the jury show on 11 May where the professional juries of each country watched and voted on the competing entries.

The Belarusian performance featured Anastasia Vinnikova performing on stage wearing a short dress together with four backing vocalists/dancers and a dulcimer player all wearing black and white outfits. Vinnikova and her backing performers used glitter microphone stands and performed a choreographed routine that involved waving hands. The LED screens displayed red and white elements that reminded of the Belarusian flag. The performance also featured pyrotechnic effects. The backing vocalists/dancers and the dulcimer player that accompanied Vinnikova during the performance were: Artyom Ahpash, Anastasiya Shik, Alyona Gorbachova, Yuri Naurotski and Ludmila Kutz. Yuri Naurotski would go on to represent Belarus in 2015 under the artistic name Uzari, performing together with Maimuna.

At the end of the show, Belarus was not announced among the top 10 entries in the second semi-final and therefore failed to qualify to compete in the final. It was later revealed that Belarus placed fourteenth in the semi-final, receiving a total of 45 points.

=== Voting ===
Voting during the three shows involved each country awarding points from 1-8, 10 and 12 as determined by a combination of 50% national jury and 50% televoting. Each participating broadcaster assembled a jury of five music industry professionals who are citizens of the country they represent. This jury judged each entry based on: vocal capacity; the stage performance; the song's composition and originality; and the overall impression by the act. In addition, no member of a national jury was permitted to be related in any way to any of the competing acts in such a way that they cannot vote impartially and independently.

Below is a breakdown of points awarded to Belarus and awarded by Belarus in the second semi-final and grand final of the contest. The nation awarded its 12 points to Ukraine in the semi-final and to Georgia in the final of the contest.

==== Points awarded to Belarus ====
Points awarded to Belarus (Semi-final 2)
Score	Country
12 points	
10 points	Moldova; Ukraine
8 points	Macedonia
7 points	
6 points	Latvia
5 points	
4 points	Estonia
3 points	Cyprus
2 points	Bosnia and Herzegovina
1 point	Romania; Slovakia

==== Points awarded by Belarus ====
Points awarded by Belarus (Semi-final 2)
Score	Country
12 points	Ukraine
10 points	Moldova
8 points	Sweden
7 points	Macedonia
6 points	Israel
5 points	Bosnia and Herzegovina
4 points	Denmark
3 points	Slovakia
2 points	Latvia
1 point	Estonia

Points awarded by Belarus (Final)
Score	Country
12 points	Georgia
10 points	Ukraine
8 points	Germany
7 points	Moldova
6 points	Azerbaijan
5 points	Russia
4 points	Sweden
3 points	Italy
2 points	United Kingdom
1 point	Denmark
