= Pavlo Tabakov =

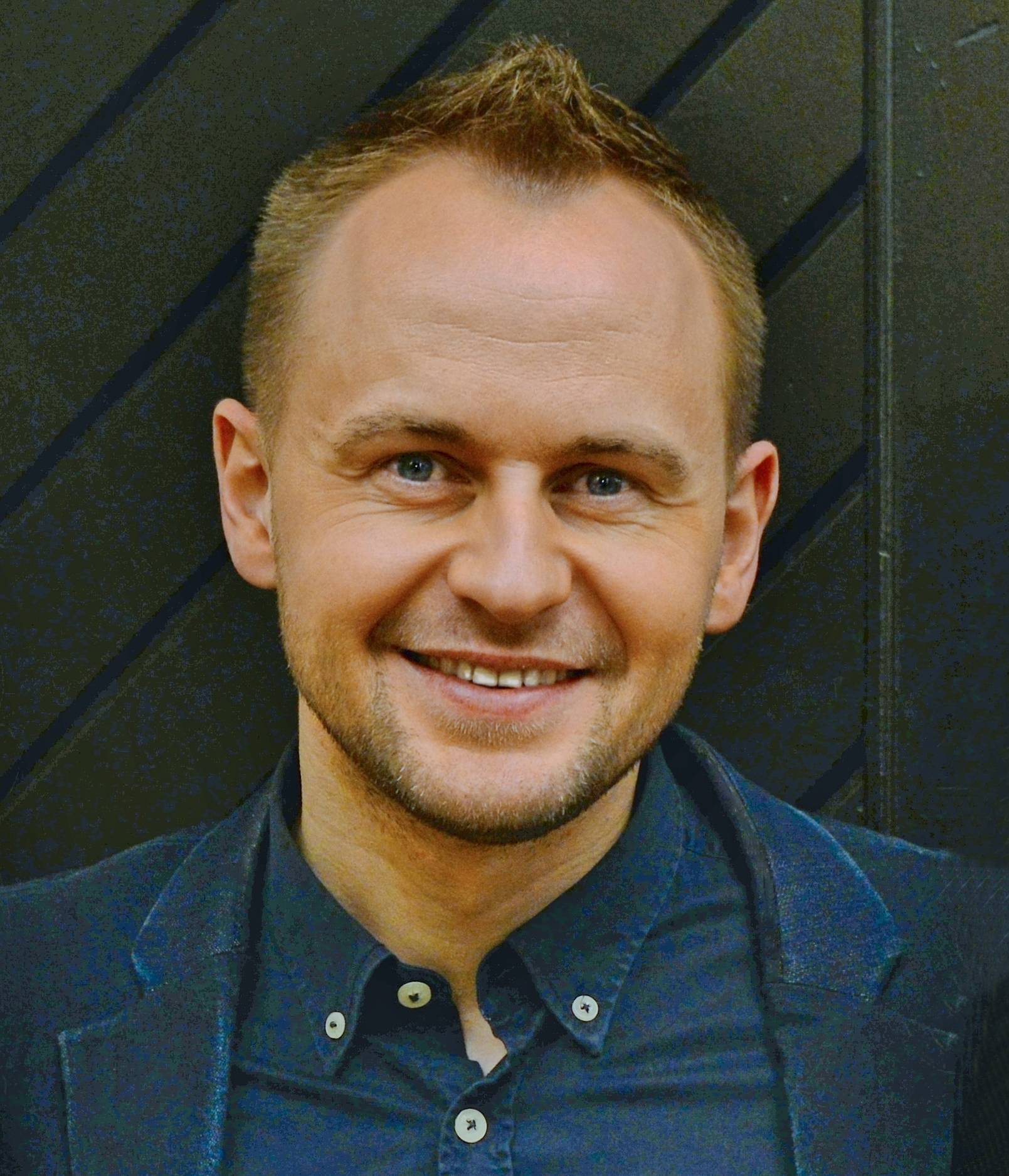

Background information
- Born: Pavlo Tabakov (Павло Табаков); 27 April 1978 (age 47); Lviv, Ukraine
- Occupations: Singer
- Instruments: Vocals, guitar

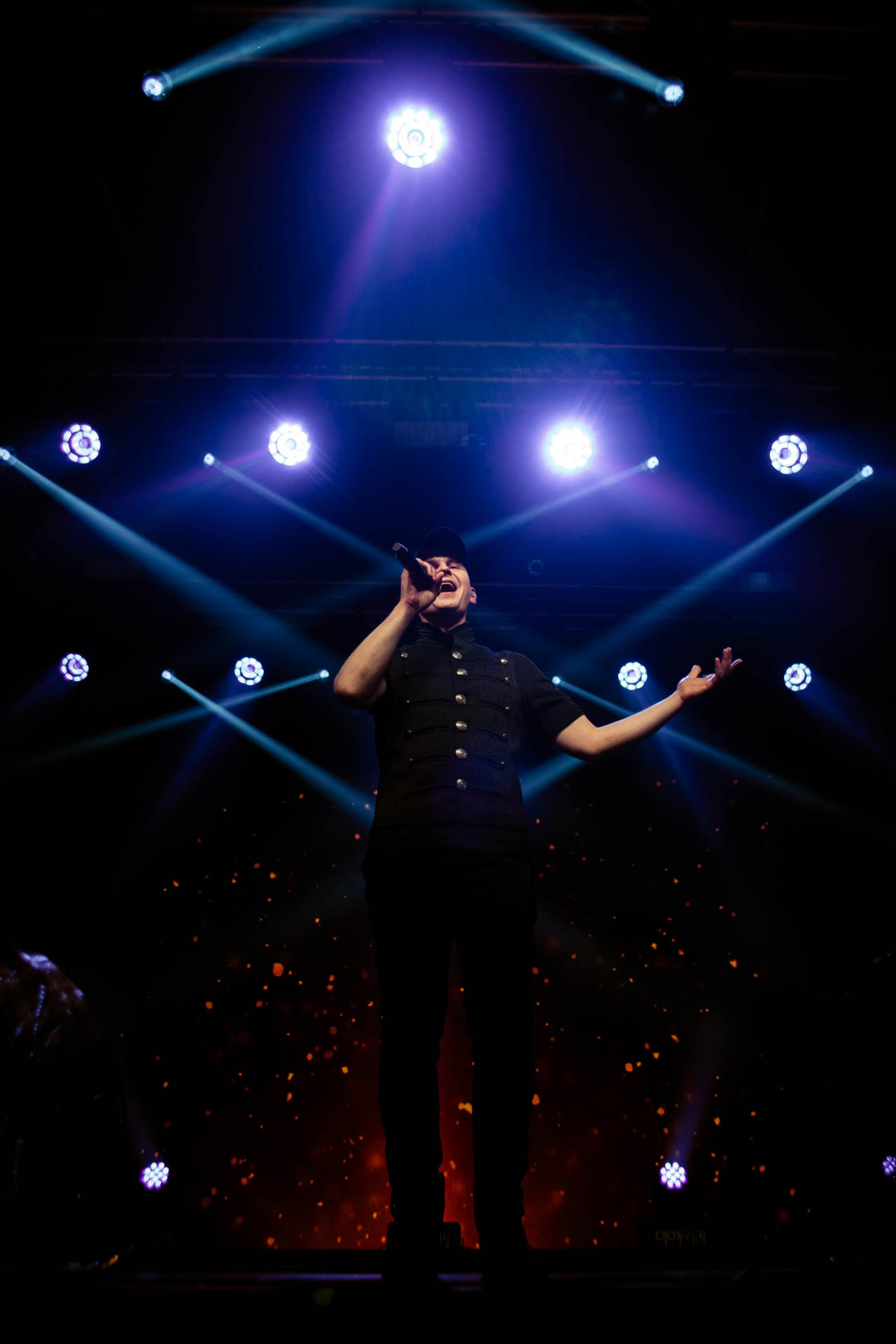
Tabakov Ukrsongproject 2022

Pavlo Anatoliyovych Tabakov (born April 27, 1978, Lviv) is a Ukrainian singer, musician, composer and arranger. Known for a vocal range of three octaves, he was the winner of the fifth season of the Ukrainian TV project Chance. He was a semifinalist of the second season of the show Ukraine's got talent. The winner of the TV project The Voice of Ukraine in the team of Diana Arbenina. Member of the national selection for the Eurovision-2011 (keeps his blog on the official website of the Eurovision song contest in Ukraine) was in the secondary educated Russian school no 45.

== Biography ==
He was born on April 27, 1978, in Lviv. In 1993–1997 he studied at the Lviv musical-pedagogical College. F. Kolessa (Department of choral conducting. 1997–2002, he studied at the Lviv music Academy. Mykola Lysenko (the Department of folk instruments; specialization Accordion and orchestra conducting).

- 1997–2003, soloist and arranger folk-jazz a cappella group The Minstrel.
- 2003–2008, soloist and arranger male octet Orpheus.

In December 2005, wins in the popular TV show Chance, after which, not wishing to sign the contract with the producer Igor Kondratyuk, starts a solo career. Debut music video for the hit song "Only you are mine", the singer took the well-known Director Maxim Papernik. May–June 2008 - tour around the Western and Central Ukraine. In the spring of 2010, together with an octet boundary Orpheus takes part in popular TV project Ukraine's got talent! the group comes to the semi-finals. In April 2012 wins in the show The Voice of the country 2. In his native Lviv Pavel Tabakov annually gives several successful solo concerts each time with a new thematic programme. Plays piano, guitar and accordion. Speaks Polish, English and French languages.

According to the rules of Ukrainian show The Voice of the country, the winner of the show gets the possibility to sign a contract with the record label Universal music. In 2012 he has become a winner of the second season of the show.

== Discography ==
- Album You're only mine (2007).
- Album of Christmas carols Xmas for two (2008).
- Album You burnt the paradise (2009).
- Album Pavlo Tabakov & Orchestra Vito - Coffee-Blues (2011).
