= Sweden in the Eurovision Song Contest 2011 =

- Eurovision Song Contest 2011
- Participating broadcaster: Sveriges Television (SVT)
- Country: Sweden
- Selection process: Melodifestivalen 2011
- Selection date: 12 March 2011

Competing entry
- Song: "Popular"
- Artist: Eric Saade
- Songwriters: Fredrik Kempe

Placement
- Semi-final result: Qualified (1st, 155 points)
- Final result: 3rd, 185 points

Participation chronology

Sweden was represented at the Eurovision Song Contest 2011 with the song "Popular", written by Fredrik Kempe, and performed by Eric Saade. The Swedish participating broadcaster, Sveriges Television (SVT), organised the national final Melodifestivalen 2011 in order to select its entry for the contest. After a six-week-long competition consisting of four heats, a Second Chance round and a final, "Popular" performed by Eric Saade emerged as the winner after achieving the highest score following the combination of votes from eleven international jury groups and a public vote.

Sweden was drawn to compete in the second semi-final of the Eurovision Song Contest which took place on 12 May 2011. Performing during the show in position 8, "Popular" was announced among the top 10 entries of the second semi-final and therefore qualified to compete in the final on 14 May. It was later revealed that Sweden placed first out of the 19 participating countries in the semi-final with 155 points. In the final, Sweden performed in position 7 and placed third out of the 25 participating countries with 185 points.

== Background ==
Prior to the 2011 contest, Sveriges Radio (SR) until 1979, and Sveriges Television (SVT) since 1980, had participated in the Eurovision Song Contest representing Sweden fifty times since SR's first entry in 1958. Sweden had won the contest on four occasions: in 1974 with the song "Waterloo" performed by ABBA, in 1984 with the song "Diggi-Loo Diggi-Ley" performed by Herreys, in 1991 with the song "Fångad av en stormvind" performed by Carola, and in 1999 with the song "Take Me to Your Heaven" performed by Charlotte Nilsson. Following the introduction of semi-finals for the 2004, Sweden's entries, to this point, have featured in every final except for 2010 when the nation failed to qualify with the song "This Is My Life" performed by Anna Bergendahl.

As part of its duties as participating broadcaster, SVT organises the selection of its entry in the Eurovision Song Contest and broadcasts the event in the country. Since 1959, SR first and SVT later have organised the annual competition Melodifestivalen in order to select their entries for the contest.

== Before Eurovision ==
=== Melodifestivalen 2011 ===
Melodifestivalen 2011 was the Swedish music competition that selected Sweden's entry for the Eurovision Song Contest 2011. 32 songs competed in a six-week-long process which consisted of four heats on 5, 12, 19 and 26 February 2011, a Second Chance round on 5 March 2011, and a final on 12 March 2011. The six shows were hosted by Marie Serneholt and Rickard Olsson. Eight songs competed in each heat—the top two qualified directly to the final, while the third and fourth placed songs qualified to the Second Chance round. The bottom four songs in each heat were eliminated from the competition. An additional two songs qualified to the final from the Second Chance round. The results in the heats and Second Chance round were determined exclusively by public televoting, while the overall winner of the competition was selected in the final through the combination of a public vote and the votes from eleven international jury groups. Among the competing artists were former Eurovision Song Contest contestants Elisabeth Andreassen who represented Sweden in 1982 as part of the group Chips as well as Norway in 1985 which she won as part of the duo Bobbysocks!, 1994 performing in a duet with Jan Werner Danielsen and 1996.

==== Heats and Second Chance round ====
- The first heat took place on 5 February 2011 at the Coop Norrbotten Arena in Luleå. "In the Club" performed by Danny Saucedo and "Me and My Drum" performed by Swingfly qualified directly to the final, while "Something in Your Eyes" performed by Jenny Silver and "Desperados" performed by Pernilla Andersson qualified to the Second Chance round. "Try Again" performed by Dilba, "On My Own" performed by Jonas Matsson, "Oh My God" performed by Le Kid, and "Social Butterfly" performed by Rasmus Viberg were eliminated.
- The second heat took place on 12 February 2011 at the Scandinavium in Gothenburg. "I'm in Love" performed by Sanna Nielsen and "7 Days and 7 Nights" performed by Brolle qualified directly to the final, while "My Heart Is Refusing Me" performed by Loreen and "Oh My God!" performed by The Moniker qualified to the Second Chance round. "Ge mig en spanjor" performed by Babsan, "Vaken i en dröm" performed by Elisabeth Andreassen, "Elektrisk" performed by Anniela, and "Like Suicide" performed by Christian Walz were eliminated.
- The third heat took place on 19 February 2011 at the Cloetta Center in Linköping. "Popular" performed by Eric Saade and "The King" performed by The Playtones qualified directly to the final, while "I Thought It Was Forever" performed by Shirley's Angels and "Spring för livet" performed by Sara Varga qualified to the Second Chance round. "Lucky You" performed by Linda Sundblad, "Tid att andas" performed by Simon Forsberg, "Enemy" performed by Sara Lumholdt, and "No One Else Could" performed by Sebastian were eliminated.
- The fourth heat took place on 26 February 2011 at the Malmö Arena in Malmö. "E de fel på mig?" performed by Linda Bengtzing and "Leaving Home" performed by Nicke Borg qualified directly to the final, while "Alive" performed by Linda Pritchard and "Dance Alone" performed by Love Generation qualified to the Second Chance round. "The Hunter" performed by Melody Club, "Better or Worse" performed by Julia Alvgard, "En blick och nånting händer" performed by Lasse Stefanz, and "Run" performed by Anders Fernette were eliminated.
- The Second Chance round (Andra chansen) took place on 5 March 2011 at the Nordichallen in Sundsvall. "Spring för livet" performed by Sara Varga and "Oh My God!" performed by The Moniker qualified to the final.

==== Final ====
The final was held on 12 March 2011 at the Globe Arena in Stockholm. Ten songs competed—two qualifiers from each of the four preceding heats and two qualifiers from the Second Chance round. The combination of points from a viewer vote and eleven international jury groups determined the winner. The viewers and the juries each had a total of 473 points to award. The nations that comprised the international jury were Croatia, France, Germany, Greece, Ireland, Malta, Norway, Russia, San Marino, the United Kingdom and Ukraine. "Popular" performed by Eric Saade was selected as the winner with 193 points.

| R/O | Artist | Song | Juries | Televote | Total | Place |
|---|---|---|---|---|---|---|
| 1 | Danny Saucedo | "In the Club" | 79 | 70 | 149 | 2 |
| 2 | Sara Varga | "Spring för livet" | 23 | 27 | 50 | 9 |
| 3 | The Moniker | "Oh My God!" | 55 | 69 | 124 | 3 |
| 4 | Brolle | "7 Days and 7 Nights" | 8 | 21 | 29 | 10 |
| 5 | Linda Bengtzing | "E de fel på mig?" | 42 | 16 | 58 | 7 |
| 6 | Nicke Borg | "Leaving Home" | 20 | 37 | 57 | 8 |
| 7 | Swingfly | "Me and My Drum" | 44 | 49 | 93 | 5 |
| 8 | Sanna Nielsen | "I'm in Love" | 75 | 39 | 114 | 4 |
| 9 | The Playtones | "The King" | 46 | 33 | 79 | 6 |
| 10 | Eric Saade | "Popular" | 81 | 112 | 193 | 1 |

== At Eurovision ==
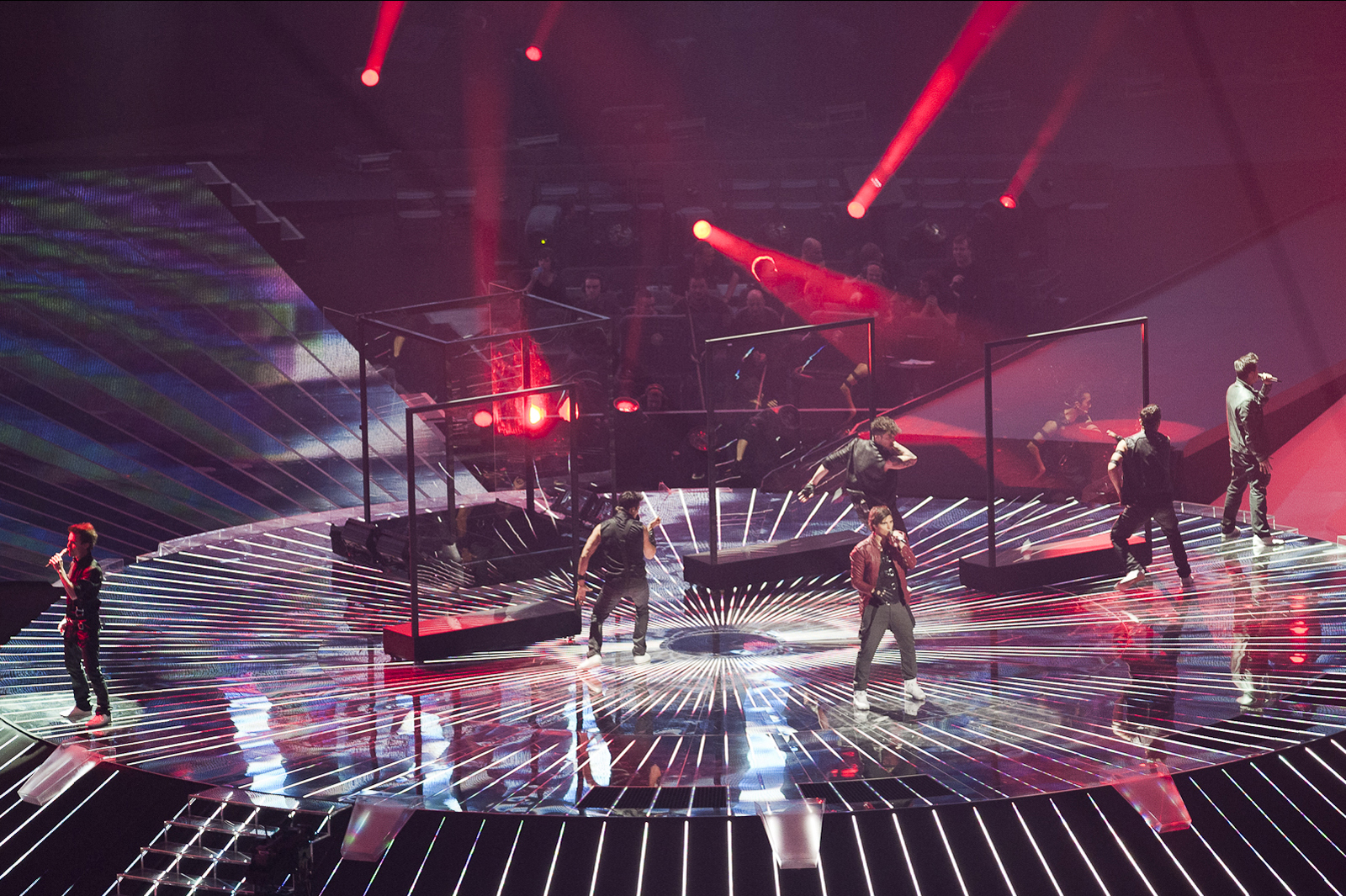
Eric Saade performing at the final of the Eurovision Song Contest 2011.

Performing 8th in the running order, following Moldova and preceding Cyprus, Sweden was called out as the last qualifier from the second semi-final on 12 May 2011. It was later revealed that Sweden placed first of nineteen competing entries in the second semi-final with 155 points. Soon after, Sweden was drawn to perform 7th in the grand final on 14 May 2011, where it finished in third place with 185 points, beaten only by Italy with 189 points and Azerbaijan with 221 points. This was the best result for Sweden since 1999, when Charlotte Nilsson won the contest.

=== Voting ===
==== Points awarded to Sweden ====
Points awarded to Sweden (Semi-final 2)
| Score | Country |
|---|---|
| 12 points | Belgium; Cyprus; Denmark; Estonia; France; Israel; Netherlands |
| 10 points | Austria |
| 8 points | Belarus; Ireland |
| 7 points | Latvia; Romania; Slovakia |
| 6 points | |
| 5 points | Bosnia and Herzegovina; Slovenia; Ukraine |
| 4 points | |
| 3 points | Italy; Moldova |
| 2 points | Macedonia |
| 1 point | Germany |

Points awarded to Sweden (Final)
| Score | Country |
|---|---|
| 12 points | Estonia; Israel |
| 10 points | Cyprus; Denmark; France; Hungary; Netherlands; Norway; Slovakia |
| 8 points | |
| 7 points | Iceland |
| 6 points | Finland; Greece; Macedonia; Malta; San Marino |
| 5 points | Bosnia and Herzegovina; Spain |
| 4 points | Armenia; Belarus; Belgium; Croatia; Ireland; Slovenia; Turkey |
| 3 points | Azerbaijan; Moldova; Romania; United Kingdom |
| 2 points | |
| 1 point | Georgia; Russia; Serbia; Ukraine |

==== Points awarded by Sweden ====
Points awarded by Sweden (Semi-final 2)
| Score | Country |
|---|---|
| 12 points | Denmark |
| 10 points | Ireland |
| 8 points | Bosnia and Herzegovina |
| 7 points | Romania |
| 6 points | Estonia |
| 5 points | Israel |
| 4 points | Austria |
| 3 points | Ukraine |
| 2 points | Latvia |
| 1 point | Bulgaria |

Points awarded by Sweden (Final)
| Score | Country |
|---|---|
| 12 points | Ireland |
| 10 points | Denmark |
| 8 points | Bosnia and Herzegovina |
| 7 points | Finland |
| 6 points | Germany |
| 5 points | Hungary |
| 4 points | Austria |
| 3 points | Azerbaijan |
| 2 points | Ukraine |
| 1 point | Iceland |
