= Austria in the Eurovision Song Contest 2011 =

- Eurovision Song Contest 2011
- Participating broadcaster: Österreichischer Rundfunk (ORF)
- Country: Austria
- Selection process: Düsseldorf - wir kommen!
- Selection date: 25 February 2011

Competing entry
- Song: "The Secret Is Love"
- Artist: Nadine Beiler
- Songwriters: Thomas Rabitsch; Nadine Beiler

Placement
- Semi-final result: Qualified (7th, 69 points)
- Final result: 18th, 64 points

Participation chronology

Austria was represented at the Eurovision Song Contest in 2011 with the song "The Secret Is Love" written by Thomas Rabitsch and Nadine Beiler. The song was performed by Nadine Beiler. In July 2010, the Austrian broadcaster Österreichischer Rundfunk (ORF) announced that they would be returning to the Eurovision Song Contest after a three-year absence following their withdrawal in 2008. ORF organised the national final Düsseldorf - wir kommen! in order to select the Austrian entry for the 2011 contest in Düsseldorf, Germany. Thirty songs competed in an online voting round titled Guten Morgen Düsseldorf, of which ten were selected to proceed to the national final. The ten songs competed in a televised show where two rounds of public voting selected the winner. The first round selected the top three entries to proceed to the second round, during which "The Secret Is Love" performed by Nadine Beiler was selected as the winner after gaining 46.73% of the votes.

Austria was drawn to compete in the second semi-final of the Eurovision Song Contest which took place on 12 May 2011. Performing during the show in position 2, "The Secret Is Love" was announced among the top 10 entries of the second semi-final and therefore qualified to compete in the final on 14 May. This marked the first time that Austria qualified to the final of the Eurovision Song Contest from a semi-final since the introduction of semi-finals in 2004. It was later revealed that Austria placed seventh out of the 19 participating countries in the semi-final with 69 points. In the final, Austria performed in position 18 and placed eighteenth out of the 25 participating countries, scoring 64 points.

== Background ==
Prior to the 2011 contest, Austria has participated in the Eurovision Song Contest forty-three times since its first entry in 1957. The nation has won the contest on one occasion: in 1966 with the song "Merci, Chérie" performed by Udo Jürgens. Following the introduction of semi-finals for the 2004 contest, Austria has featured in only one final. Austria's least successful result has been last place, which they have achieved on seven occasions, most recently in 1991. Austria has also received nul points on three occasions; in 1962, 1988 and 1991.

The Austrian national broadcaster, Österreichischer Rundfunk (ORF), broadcasts the event within Austria and organises the selection process for the nation's entry. Following the 2007 contest, the Austrian broadcaster announced in November 2007 that the country would not participate in 2008 citing poor results in the 2007 contest and declining interest as reasons for their decision. The nation also did not participate in 2009 and 2010, with ORF Head of Entertainment Edgar Böhm stating that the newly introduced semi-final format "still incorporates a mix of countries who will be politically favoured in the voting process". Following their three-year absence, ORF confirmed their intentions to participate at the 2011 Eurovision Song Contest on 27 July 2010. From 2002 to 2005, ORF had set up national finals with several artists to choose both the song and performer to compete at Eurovision for Austria. In 2007, ORF held an internal selection to choose the artist and song to represent Austria at the contest. On 26 October 2010, the broadcaster also announced that the Austrian entry for the 2011 contest would be selected through a national final.

== Before Eurovision ==
=== Düsseldorf - wir kommen! ===
Düsseldorf - wir kommen! (Düsseldorf - here we come!) was the national final that selected Austria's entry for the Eurovision Song Contest 2011. The competition took place on 25 February 2011 at the ORF Center in Vienna, hosted by Mirjam Weichselbraun and Robert Kratky with Andi Knoll hosting from the green room. The show was broadcast on ORF eins as well as streamed online via ORF's official website and the official Eurovision Song Contest website eurovision.tv. The first part of the national final was watched by 736,000 viewers in Austria with a market share of 26%, while the second part was watched by 818,000 viewers in Austria with a market share of 37%.

==== Format ====
Thirty songs competed in an online selection titled Guten Morgen Düsseldorf (Good Morning Düsseldorf), where public voting via SMS and a 15-member expert jury panel consisting of representatives of the radio station Ö3 selected ten entries for the national final. After the combination of the jury and public votes which each distributed points from 1 to 30 based on overall ranking, the top ten ranked entries proceeded to the national final where the winner was selected over two rounds of public voting via telephone or SMS. In the first round, the top three entries were selected to advance to the second round, during which the winner was selected.

==== Competing entries ====
ORF invited all interested artists to submit their songs to the broadcaster between 26 October 2010 and 10 December 2010. Each application was required to be backed by at least 33 people in order to be eligible for consideration. The public was also able to nominate artists for the national final on the same condition that they were backed by at least 33 people. All applications were posted on Ö3's official website, which included entries from former Austrian Eurovision representatives Hans Kreuzmayr–Waterloo (1976), Josef Krassnitzer–Robinson (1976), Petra Frey (1994), Alf Poier (2003) and di Bernando (2004 as part of Tie Break). The broadcaster received 210 submissions at the close of the deadline, which were reviewed by the Ö3 team led by Head of Ö3 Georg Spatt that selected 30 entries to compete in the online selection. The thirty artists and songs were revealed on 3 January 2011.

Artist	Song	Songwriter(s)
Alf Poier und die obersteirische Wolfshilfe	"Happy Song"	Alf Poier
Alkbottle	"Wir san do net zum Spaß"	Chris Zitta, Marco Billiani, Roman Gregory
Any Major Dude	"July"	Christoph Linher
Axel Wolph and Feeltank Orchestra	"My Little Reminder"	Axel Wolph
Band WG	"10 Sekunden Glück"	Markus Weiß, Mia Koller, Bern Wagner
Cama	"Times of Our Lives"	Carmen Maier, David Bronner, Matthias Kadoff
Charlee	"Good to Be Bad"	K.C. Tian, Anna Molander, Hubert Molander
CoryBanTic and Chris Schaller	"Try to Forget Her"	Chris Schaller, Christoph Konrad, Johannes Maier, Julian Schaller
Eva K. Anderson	"I Will Be Here"	Eva K. Anderson, Harald Hanisch
Excuse Me Moses	"Way Out"	Michael Paukner, Dietmar Schrödl, Gerald Weichselbaum, Martin Scheer
Freddy Sahin-Scholl	"Butterfly"	Cae Gauntt, Freddy Sahin-Scholl, Florian Sitzmann
Heinz aus Wien	"È cosi"	Bernd Jungmair, Cornelius Dix, Helmut Brossmann, Michael Gaissmaier
Jean Nolan	"Crazy"	Jean Nolan
Julian Heidrich	"Australian Gate"	Julian Heidrich, Lukas Hillebrand
Katie Lunette	"My Home"	Katrin Lampe, Disgo, Sanio
Klimmstein feat. Joe Sumner	"Paris, Paris"	Enzo Sutera, Gernot Höfler, Horst Klimstein, Markus Bieder, Salvatore Denaro, Joseph Sumner, Werner Posekany
Lana Gordon	"Ask the Universe"	Werner Stranka, Martin Gellner
Louie Austen	"Make Your Move"	Aid Abu Taleb, Don Summer, Sophie Geymueller
Luttenberger*Klug	"Sternenlichter"	Andreas Grass, Nikola Paryla
Mary Broadcast Band	"Who's Gonna Stop Me"	Mary Lamaro
Matara	"Why Do I"	Matara
Missy May	"It's a Girl's Life"	Peter Wolf
Nadine Beiler	"The Secret Is Love"	Thomas Rabitsch, Nadine Beiler
Oliver Wimmer	"Let Love Kick In"	Oliver Wimmer
Patricia Kaiser and Leo Aberer	"There Will Never Be Another You"	Leo Aberer, Paul Wegschaider
Petra Frey	"Send a Little Smile"	Werner Schüler, Norbert Beyerl
Richard Klein	"Bigger Better Best"	Bernd Jungmair, Markus Gartner
Robi Faustmann	"Neuer Wind"	Markus Adamer, Robi Faustmann
Sellyy	"Lethargie"	Alexander Kahr
Trackshittaz	"Oida Taunz!"	Lukas Plöchl, Manuel Hoffelner

==== Guten Morgen Düsseldorf ====
The thirty competing songs were posted on Ö3's official website for a public voting period that ran between 3 and 31 January 2011. The ten entries selected by the combination of votes from a jury panel and the public vote to compete in the national final were revealed on 1 February 2011.

Guten Morgen Düsseldorf – 1 February 2011
R/O	Artist	Song	Jury	Televote	Total	Place
1	Eva K. Anderson	"I Will Be Here"	5	13	18	7
2	Nadine Beiler	"The Secret Is Love"	3	9	12	2
3	Patricia Kaiser and Leo Aberer	"There Will Never Be Another You"	13	1	14	4
4	Oliver Wimmer	"Let Love Kick In"	7	14	21	9
5	Excuse Me Moses	"Way Out"	6	16	22	11
6	Alkbottle	"Wir san do net zum Spaß"	13	4	17	6
7	Richard Klein	"Bigger Better Best"	2	10	12	3
8	Mary Broadcast Band	"Who's Gonna Stop Me"	25	8	33	17
9	Heinz aus Wien	"È cosi"	23	30	53	28
10	Julian Heidrich	"Australian Gate"	24	3	27	14
11	Any Major Dude	"July"	6	25	41	23
12	Katie Lunette	"My Home"	19	6	25	12
13	Matara	"Why Do I"	27	19	46	24
14	Robi Faustmann	"Neuer Wind"	22	18	40	22
15	Louie Austen	"Make Your Move"	8	26	34	20
16	Charlee	"Good to Be Bad"	10	12	22	10
17	Axel Wolph and Feeltank Orchestra	"My Little Reminder"	20	29	49	25
18	Petra Frey	"Send a Little Smile"	17	20	37	21
19	Lana Gordon	"Ask the Universe"	26	28	54	29
20	Cama	"Times of Our Lives"	9	17	26	13
21	Sellyy	"Lethargie"	29	27	56	30
22	Jean Nolan	"Crazy"	18	15	33	18
23	Luttenberger*Klug	"Sternenlichter"	21	11	32	16
24	Alf Poier und die obersteirische Wolfshilfe	"Happy Song"	11	22	33	19
25	Missy May	"It's a Girl's Life"	28	23	51	27
26	Trackshittaz	"Oida Taunz!"	12	2	14	5
27	CoryBanTic and Chris Schaller	"Try to Forget Her"	30	21	51	26
28	Freddy Sahin-Scholl	"Butterfly"	4	24	28	15
29	Band WG	"10 Sekunden Glück"	15	5	20	8
30	Klimmstein feat. Joe Sumner	"Paris, Paris"	1	7	8	1

==== National final ====
The televised national final took place on 25 February 2011. Ten songs competed in the first round where the top three were selected by a public vote to proceed to the second round. In the second round, public televoting selected "The Secret Is Love" performed by Nadine Beiler as the winner.

First Round – 25 February 2011
R/O	Artist	Song	Televote	Place
1 (Note: Due to technical difficulties in the performance, Band WG was allowed to perform again following Richard Klein performing "Bigger Better Best".)	Band WG	"10 Sekunden Glück"	4.15%	7
2	Patricia Kaiser and Leo Aberer	"There Will Never Be Another You"	3.08%	9
3	Oliver Wimmer	"Let Love Kick In"	1.93%	10
4	Alkbottle	"Wir san do net zum Spaß"	4.2%	6
5	Eva K. Anderson	"I Will Be Here"	5.54%	5
6	Trackshittaz	"Oida Taunz!"	24.27%	2
7	Charlee	"Good to Be Bad"	3.65%	8
8	Klimmstein feat. Joe Sumner	"Paris, Paris"	12.54%	3
9	Nadine Beiler	"The Secret Is Love"	34.95%	1
10	Richard Klein	"Bigger Better Best"	5.69%	4

Second Round - 25 February 2011
R/O	Artist	Song	Televote	Place
1	Trackshittaz	"Oida Taunz!"	32.87%	2
2	Klimmstein feat. Joe Sumner	"Paris, Paris"	20.41%	3
3	Nadine Beiler	"The Secret Is Love"	46.73%	1

== At Eurovision ==
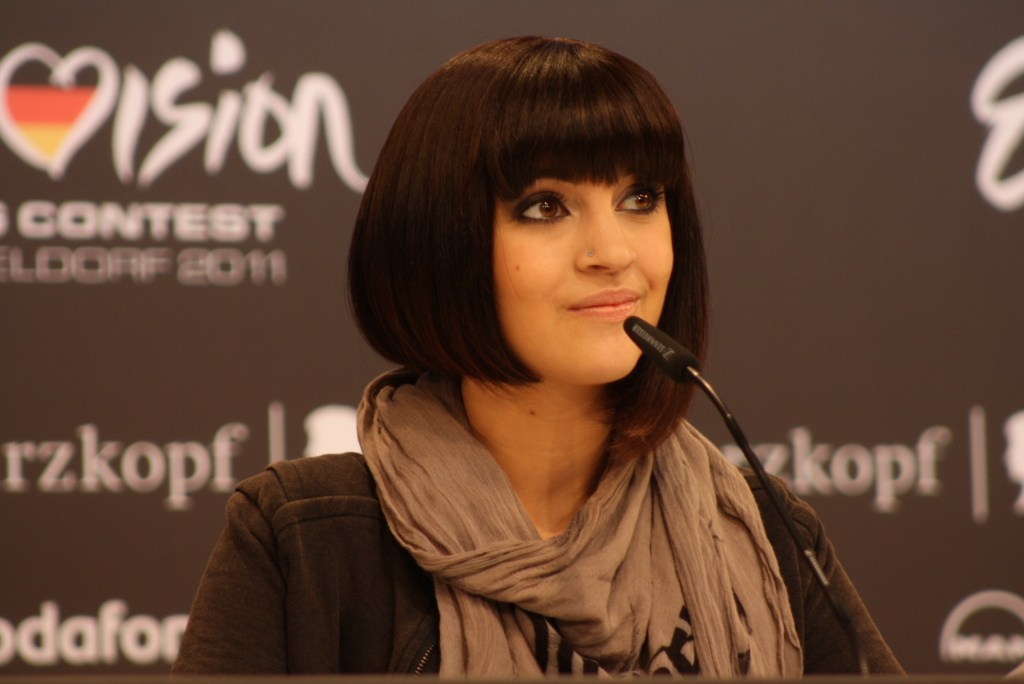
Nadine Beiler during a press meet and greet

All countries except the "Big Five" (France, Germany, Italy, Spain and the United Kingdom), and the host country, are required to qualify from one of two semi-finals in order to compete for the final; the top ten countries from each semi-final progress to the final. The European Broadcasting Union (EBU) split up the competing countries into six different pots based on voting patterns from previous contests, with countries with favourable voting histories put into the same pot. On 17 January 2011, a special allocation draw was held which placed each country into one of the two semi-finals, as well as which half of the show they would perform in. Austria was placed into the second semi-final, to be held on 12 May 2011, and was scheduled to perform in the first half of the show. The running order for the semi-finals was decided through another draw on 15 March 2011 and Austria was set to perform in position 2, following the entry from Bosnia and Herzegovina and before the entry from the Netherlands.

The two semi-finals and the final were broadcast in Austria on ORF eins with commentary by Andi Knoll and via radio on Ö3 with commentary by Martin Blumenau and Benny Hörtnagl. The Austrian spokesperson, who announced the Austrian votes during the final, was Kati Bellowitsch.

=== Semi-final ===
Nadine Beiler took part in technical rehearsals on 3 and 6 May, followed by dress rehearsals on 11 and 12 May. This included the jury show on 11 May where the professional juries of each country watched and voted on the competing entries.

The Austrian performance featured Nadine Beiler performing on stage in a short black dress with gemstones and Swarovski crystals attached, with flying diamonds on a black background appearing on the LED screens as well as a revolving star appearing on the stage floor. During the performance, Beiler performed on a crystallised platform accompanied by smoke effects. Nadine Beiler was joined by five backing vocalists on stage: Anne Semper, Juliane Janoska, Karin Ziegelwanger, Maria Rerych and Renee Benson.

At the end of the show, Austria was announced as having finished in the top 10 and subsequently qualifying for the grand final. This marked the first time that Austria qualified to the final of the Eurovision Song Contest from a semi-final since the introduction of semi-finals in 2004. It was later revealed that Austria placed seventh in the semi-final, receiving a total of 69 points.

=== Final ===
Shortly after the second semi-final, a winners' press conference was held for the ten qualifying countries. As part of this press conference, the qualifying artists took part in a draw to determine the running order for the final. This draw was done in the order the countries were announced during the semi-final. Austria was drawn to perform in position 18, following the entry from Romania and before the entry from Azerbaijan.

Nadine Beiler once again took part in dress rehearsals on 13 and 14 May before the final, including the jury final where the professional juries cast their final votes before the live show. Nadine Beiler performed a repeat of her semi-final performance during the final on 14 May. At the conclusion of the voting, Austria finished in eighteenth place with 64 points.

=== Voting ===
Voting during the three shows consisted of 50 percent public televoting and 50 percent from a jury deliberation. The jury consisted of five music industry professionals who were citizens of the country they represent. This jury was asked to judge each contestant based on: vocal capacity; the stage performance; the song's composition and originality; and the overall impression by the act. In addition, no member of a national jury could be related in any way to any of the competing acts in such a way that they cannot vote impartially and independently.

Following the release of the full split voting by the EBU after the conclusion of the competition, it was revealed that Austria had placed twenty-fourth with the public televote and fifth with the jury vote in the final. In the public vote, Austria scored 25 points, while with the jury vote, Austria scored 145 points. In the second semi-final, Austria placed tenth with the public televote with 52 points and fourth with the jury vote, scoring 95 points.

Below is a breakdown of points awarded to Austria and awarded by Austria in the second semi-final and grand final of the contest. The nation awarded its 12 points to Bosnia and Herzegovina in the semi-final and the final of the contest.

==== Points awarded to Austria ====
Points awarded to Austria (Semi-final 2)
Score	Country
12 points	Germany
10 points	Bulgaria
8 points	
7 points	Bosnia and Herzegovina; Slovenia
6 points	
5 points	Denmark; Italy; Slovakia
4 points	Cyprus; Sweden
3 points	Netherlands
2 points	Estonia; Ireland
1 point	France; Israel; Ukraine

Points awarded to Austria (Final)
Score	Country
12 points	Germany
10 points	
8 points	
7 points	Bosnia and Herzegovina; Switzerland
6 points	
5 points	Bulgaria; Slovenia
4 points	Sweden
3 points	Armenia; Croatia; Georgia; Slovakia
2 points	Hungary; Macedonia; Malta; United Kingdom
1 point	Denmark; Finland; Netherlands; Turkey

==== Points awarded by Austria ====
Points awarded by Austria (Semi-final 2)
Score	Country
12 points	Bosnia and Herzegovina
10 points	Sweden
8 points	Slovenia
7 points	Denmark
6 points	Romania
5 points	Estonia
4 points	Latvia
3 points	Slovakia
2 points	Bulgaria
1 point	Belgium

Points awarded by Austria (Final)
Score	Country
12 points	Bosnia and Herzegovina
10 points	Germany
8 points	Azerbaijan
7 points	Serbia
6 points	Italy
5 points	Moldova
4 points	Ireland
3 points	Slovenia
2 points	Hungary
1 point	Romania

== After Eurovision ==
"The Secret Is Love", which entered Austria's Ö3 Top 40 singles chart at number 9 on 11 March 2011, peaked again at number 9 on 27 May 2011. The song also entered Germany's official charts the same day, peaking at number 71.
