= United Kingdom in the Eurovision Song Contest 2011 =

- Eurovision Song Contest 2011
- Participating broadcaster: British Broadcasting Corporation (BBC)
- Country: United Kingdom
- Selection process: Internal selection
- Announcement date: Artist: 29 January 2011; Song: 11 March 2011

Competing entry
- Song: "I Can"
- Artist: Blue
- Songwriters: Duncan James; Lee Ryan; Ciaron Bell; Ben Collier; Ian Hope; Liam Keenan; StarSign

Placement
- Final result: 11th, 100 points

Participation chronology

The United Kingdom was represented at the Eurovision Song Contest 2011 with the song "I Can" written by Duncan James, Lee Ryan, Ciaron Bell, Ben Collier, Ian Hope, Liam Keenan and StarSign, and performed by the group Blue. The British participating broadcaster, the British Broadcasting Corporation (BBC), internally selected both the song and the performer. Blue was announced as the British entrant on 29 January 2011, while the song "I Can" was presented to the public on 11 March 2011.

As a member of the "Big Five", the United Kingdom automatically qualified to compete in the final of the Eurovision Song Contest. Performing in position 14, the United Kingdom placed 11th out of the 25 participating countries with 100 points.

== Background ==
Prior to the 2011 contest, the British Broadcasting Corporation (BBC) had participated in the Eurovision Song Contest representing the United Kingdom fifty-three times. Thus far, it has won the contest five times: in 1967 with the song "Puppet on a String" performed by Sandie Shaw, in 1969 with the song "Boom Bang-a-Bang" performed by Lulu, in 1976 with the song "Save Your Kisses for Me" performed by Brotherhood of Man, in 1981 with the song "Making Your Mind Up" performed by Bucks Fizz, and in 1997 with the song "Love Shine a Light" performed by Katrina and the Waves. To this point, the nation is noted for having finished as the runner-up in a record fifteen contests. Up to and including 1998, the UK had only twice finished outside the top 10, in 1978 and 1987. Since 1999, the year in which the rule was abandoned that songs must be performed in one of the official languages of the country participating, the UK has had less success, thus far only finishing within the top ten twice: in 2002 with the song "Come Back" performed by Jessica Garlick and in 2009 with the song "It's My Time" performed by Jade Ewen. For the 2010 contest, the United Kingdom finished in twenty-fifth place (last) out of twenty-five competing entries with the song "That Sounds Good to Me" performed by Josh Dubovie.

As part of its duties as participating broadcaster, the BBC organises the selection of its entry in the Eurovision Song Contest and broadcasts the event in the country. The broadcaster announced that it would participate in the 2011 contest on 20 December 2011. BBC has traditionally organised a national final featuring a competition among several artists and songs to choose the British entry for Eurovision. For their 2011 entry, BBC announced that they would opt to internally select the British entry due to poor results and decreasing public interest after a record low viewing figures had been achieved for the 2010 contest. This marked the first time that an internal selection would take place to select United Kingdom's entry since their first entry in 1957.

== Before Eurovision ==
=== Internal selection ===
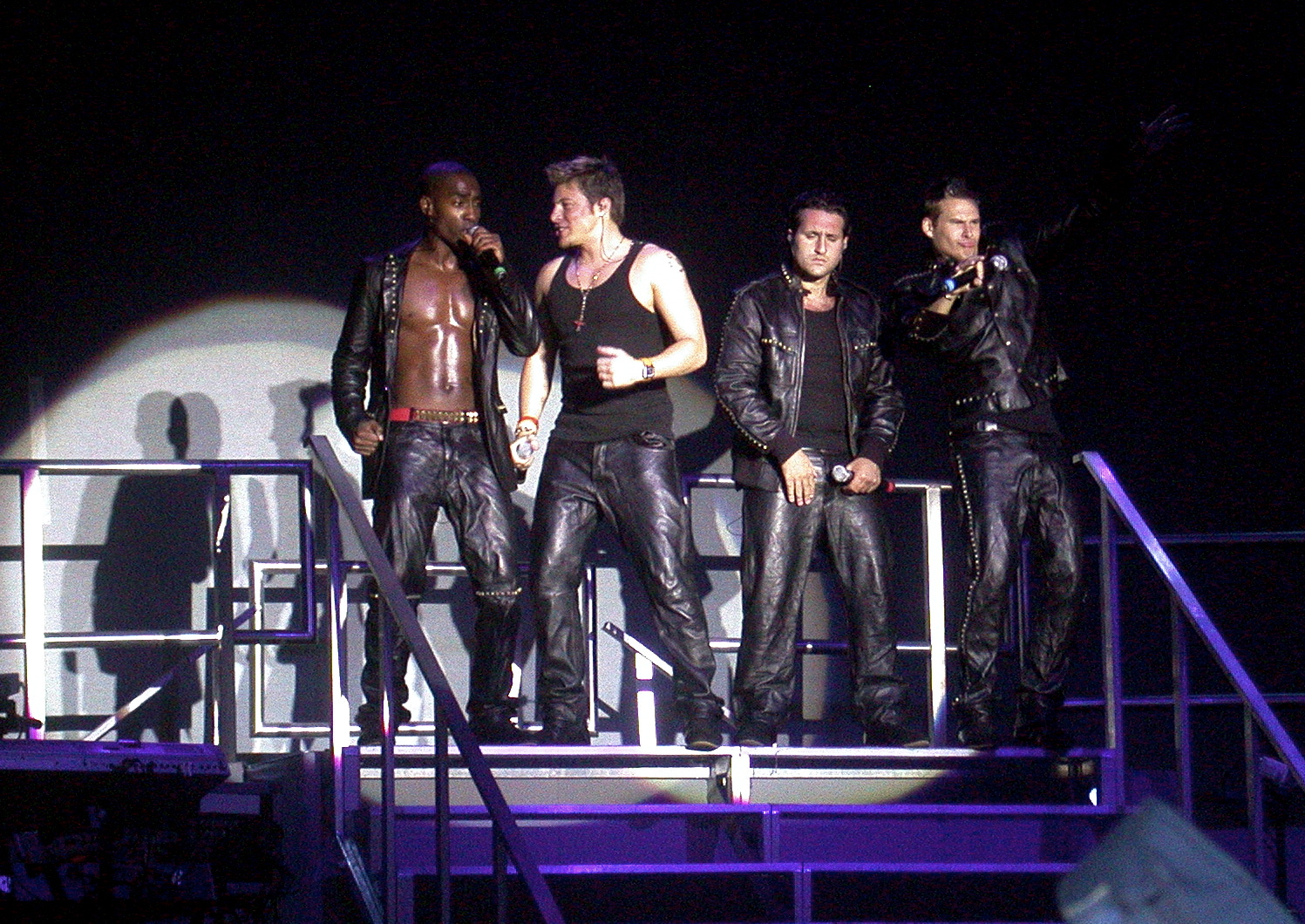
Blue was internally selected to represent the United Kingdom in the Eurovision Song Contest 2011

On 29 January 2011, the group Blue was revealed as the British entrant for the Eurovision Song Contest 2011. Among the group members were Antony Costa who previously attempted to represent the United Kingdom at the 2006 Eurovision Song Contest, placing second in the national final Eurovision: Making Your Mind Up with the song "It's a Beautiful Thing", and Duncan James who had previously been the British spokesperson at the Eurovision Song Contest 2009, revealing the results of the British vote. Prior to the announcement of Blue as the British representative, artists that were rumoured included singers Charlotte Church, Katherine Jenkins and Pixie Lott, the duo Hurts, actress Margi Clarke and Big Brother 2004 winner Nadia Almada, while singer-songwriter Mika was reported in July 2010 to be in talks with the BBC to write the British entry.

On 10 March 2011, the song "I Can" written by members of Blue Duncan James and Lee Ryan together with Ciaron Bell, Ben Collier, Ian Hope, Liam Keenan and StarSign was previewed and presented during a press conference, and was presented to the public on 11 March 2011 during the BBC One programme The Graham Norton Show, hosted by Graham Norton.

=== Criticism ===
BBC's selection of Blue as the British representatives for the 2011 Eurovision Song Contest received criticism from British media. Matt Williams of The Independent referred the group as a "nineties boy band", while Neil McCormick of The Daily Telegraph labelled the group's selection as "boardroom meetings and internal discussions involving unspecified members of the BBC hierarchy, imposing both a band and a song on the British public" and "high handed Auntie-knows-best arrogance allied [...] to the pop instincts of out-of-touch bureaucrats". Criticism was also made by Blue's former manager Daniel Glatman who described the group's decision to compete in Eurovision "reckless insanity", and by previously rumoured act Hurts which revealed that they had instead submitted their song to the Russian broadcaster "in light of the recent dark and depressing Eurovision news from the UK". Blue subsequently stated that their Eurovision participation would serve as an international springboard for the group's reunion, pledging people to wait until the song release.

Blue's contest entry was also met with criticism, including from television presenter Phillip Schofield who called it "a shocking song". The group responded to Schofield by calling his comments "upsetting" and "hurtful" as well as accusing him of seeking publicity from being overshadowed by Jason Gardiner on Dancing on Ice. Television presenter and Loose Women panellist Denise Welch also responded to Schofield in defense of the group, stating that the British public should support their act regardless of the song. Prior to the contest, group member Simon Webbe expressed his dissatisfaction with the lack of domestic support for "I Can" with few radio stations, including BBC stations, play-listing the song. A BBC spokesman later stated that their entry would be considered later on merit.

=== Preparation ===
The first version of the official music video of "I Can", filmed on top of a building in London, was released on 12 March 2011 in order to promote the special BBC One documentary Eurovision: Your Country Needs Blue. The official version of the music video was released by the BBC on 14 April 2011.

=== Promotion ===
Blue made several appearances across Europe to specifically promote "I Can" as the British Eurovision entry. On 12 February, Blue performed during the final of the Maltese Eurovision national final. On 18 February, Blue performed during the final of the Spanish Eurovision national final. On 26 March, Blue performed "I Can" in Italy during the Top of the Pops Italy. On 9 April, Blue performed during the Eurovision in Concert event which was held at the Club Air venue in Amsterdam, Netherlands and hosted by Cornald Maas, Esther Hart and Sascha Korf. On 22 April, Blue performed in Ireland during The Late Late Show on RTÉ One. On 24 April, Blue performed at a concert held at the Independence Square in Kyiv, Ukraine, as well as during Tantsi z zirkamy, the Ukrainian version of Dancing with the Stars on commercial broadcaster STB. The band also took part in promotional activities in Azerbaijan.

In addition to their international appearances, on 16 April, Blue were featured on the documentary Eurovision: Your Country Needs Blue, which covered the preparations of the band and featured advice from singers Robbie Williams, JLS, John Barrowman, Robin Gibb of the Bee Gees, composer David Arnold, choreographer Arlene Phillips, and former British representatives Cliff Richard and Lulu. On 17 March, Blue appeared during the BBC Red Nose Day telethon in order to raise money for the appeal. The band also appeared nude in British gay monthly magazine Attitude as part of their naked issue in April, taking the cover spot as well as a feature article in the magazine. On 29 April, Blue performed during the ITV programme Paul O'Grady Live and on 30 April during the dance competition So You Think You Can Dance. Blue completed promotional activities where they performed during the ITV chat show Loose Women and the BBC children's show Blue Peter on 3 May.

== At Eurovision ==
According to Eurovision rules, all nations with the exceptions of the host country and the "Big Five" (France, Germany, Italy, Spain and the United Kingdom) are required to compete in one of two semi-finals, and qualify in order to participate in the final; the top ten countries from each semi-final progress to the final. As a member of the "Big 5", the United Kingdom automatically qualified to compete in the final on 14 May 2011. In addition to their participation in the final, the United Kingdom is also required to broadcast and vote in one of the two semi-finals. During the semi-final allocation draw on 17 January 2011, the United Kingdom was assigned to broadcast and vote in the first semi-final on 10 May 2011.

In the United Kingdom, the semi-finals were broadcast on BBC Three and BBC HD with commentary by Scott Mills in London and Sara Cox, who interviewed guests live from the arena. The final was televised on BBC One and BBC One HD with commentary by Graham Norton and broadcast on BBC Radio 2 with commentary by Ken Bruce. The British spokesperson, who announced the British votes during the final, was Alex Jones.

=== Final ===
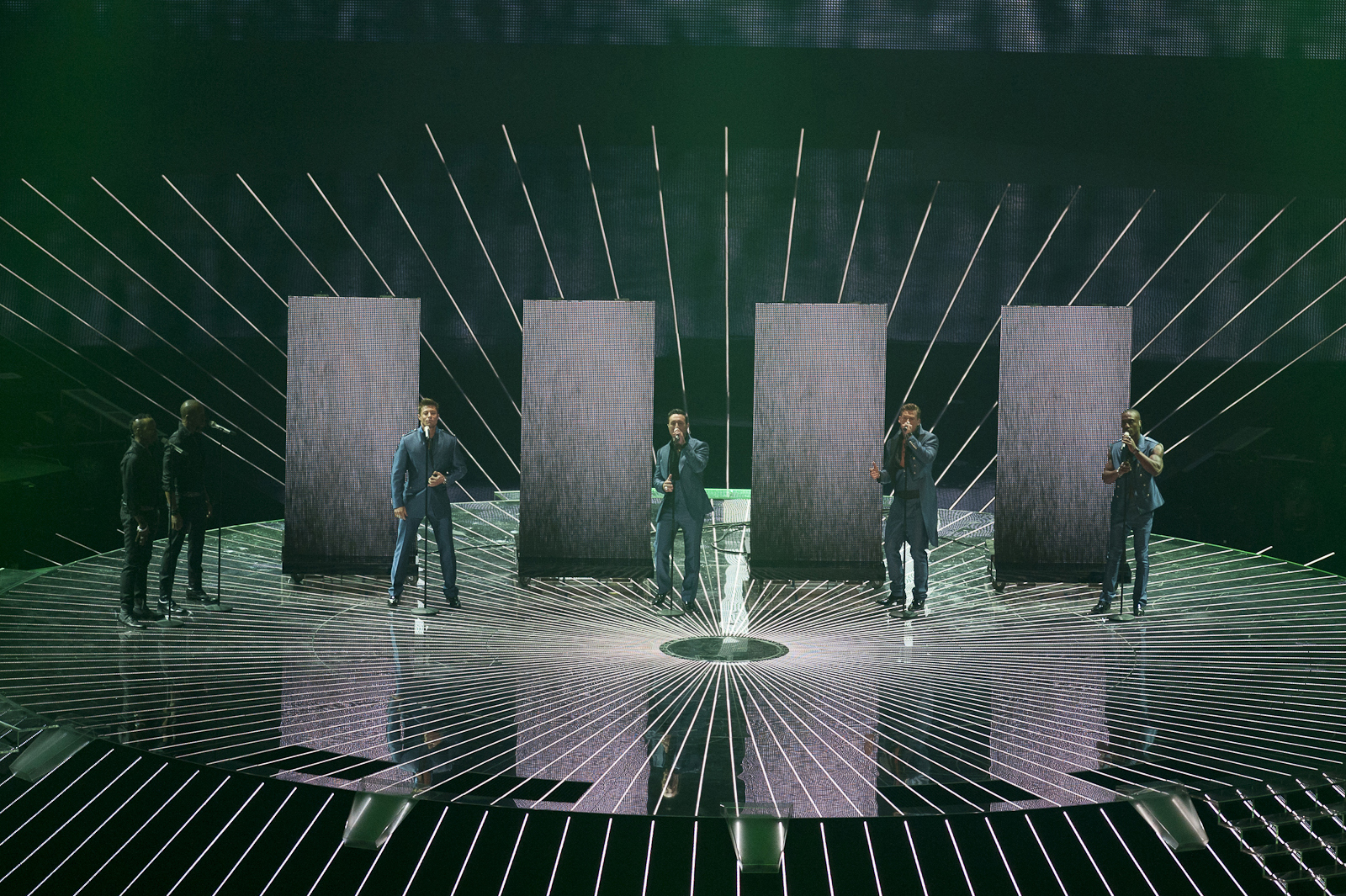
Blue performing during the final

Blue took part in technical rehearsals on 7 and 8 May, followed by dress rehearsals on 13 and 14 May. This included the jury final on 13 May where the professional juries of each country watched and voted on the competing entries. During the running order draw on 15 March which determined the running order of the British entry in the final, United Kingdom was drawn to perform in position 14, following the entry from Switzerland and before the entry from Moldova. On the day of the final, the United Kingdom was considered by bookmakers to be the fourth most likely country to win the competition.

The British performance featured the members of Blue, dressed in blue outfits, performing a choreographed dance routine on a predominately blue and green coloured stage which featured four small LED screens displaying images of the band members, the letters "I CAN" as well as other images such as rain and green lightning. The band was joined by two male backing vocalists, Bryan Chambers and Daniel Thomas, dressed in black outfits. The main LED screens displayed abstract images in shades of green that alternate during the performance, which also featured pyrotechnic effects. The United Kingdom placed eleventh in the final, scoring 100 points.

=== Voting ===
Voting during the three shows involved each country awarding points from 1–8, 10 and 12 as determined by a combination of 50% national jury and 50% televoting. Each nation's jury consisted of five music industry professionals who are citizens of the country they represent. This jury judged each entry based on: vocal capacity; the stage performance; the song's composition and originality; and the overall impression by the act. In addition, no member of a national jury was permitted to be related in any way to any of the competing acts in such a way that they cannot vote impartially and independently.

Following the release of the full split voting by the EBU after the conclusion of the competition, it was revealed that the United Kingdom had placed fifth with the public televote and twenty-second with the jury vote. In the public vote, the United Kingdom scored 166 points and in the jury vote the nation scored 57 points.

Below is a breakdown of points awarded to the United Kingdom and awarded by United Kingdom in the first semi-final and grand final of the contest. The nation awarded its 12 points to Lithuania in the semi-final and to Ireland in the final of the contest.

==== Points awarded to the United Kingdom ====
Points awarded to the United Kingdom (Final)
Score	Country
12 points	Bulgaria
10 points	Italy
8 points	
7 points	Malta
6 points	Albania; Ireland; Turkey
5 points	Azerbaijan; Latvia; Macedonia
4 points	Cyprus; Moldova; Russia
3 points	Denmark; Lithuania; Portugal; Ukraine
2 points	Armenia; Belarus; Greece; Iceland; San Marino
1 point	France; Israel; Norway; Slovenia

==== Points awarded by the United Kingdom ====
Points awarded by the United Kingdom (Semi-final 1)
Score	Country
12 points	Lithuania
10 points	Hungary
8 points	Greece
7 points	Iceland
6 points	Finland
5 points	Poland
4 points	Azerbaijan
3 points	Portugal
2 points	Switzerland
1 point	Turkey

Points awarded by the United Kingdom (Final)
Score	Country
12 points	Ireland
10 points	Switzerland
8 points	Moldova
7 points	Italy
6 points	Lithuania
5 points	Denmark
4 points	Iceland
3 points	Sweden
2 points	Austria
1 point	Spain

==== Detailed voting results ====
Detailed voting results from the United Kingdom (Semi-Final 1)
R/O	Country	Results			Points
R/O	Country	Jury	Televoting	Combined	Points
01	Poland		8	8	5
02	Norway	3	1	4	
03	Albania		2	2	
04	Armenia				
05	Turkey		4	4	1
06	Serbia	4		4	
07	Russia				
08	Switzerland	5		5	2
09	Georgia	2		2	
10	Finland	8	3	11	6
11	Malta	1		1	
12	San Marino				
13	Croatia				
14	Iceland	6	6	12	7
15	Hungary	10	7	17	10
16	Portugal		5	5	3
17	Lithuania	12	10	22	12
18	Azerbaijan	7		7	4
19	Greece		12	12	8

Detailed voting results from the United Kingdom (Final)
R/O	Country	Results			Points
R/O	Country	Jury	Televoting	Combined	Points
01	Finland				
02	Bosnia and Herzegovina				
03	Denmark	6	3	9	5
04	Lithuania	2	7	9	6
05	Hungary		2	2	
06	Ireland	8	12	20	12
07	Sweden	3	5	8	3
08	Estonia				
09	Greece		4	4	
10	Russia				
11	France				
12	Italy	10		10	7
13	Switzerland	12		12	10
14	United Kingdom				
15	Moldova		10	10	8
16	Germany		1	1	
17	Romania				
18	Austria	7		7	2
19	Azerbaijan	1		1	
20	Slovenia				
21	Iceland		8	8	4
22	Spain		6	6	1
23	Ukraine				
24	Serbia	5		5	
25	Georgia	4		4	

== After Eurovision ==
The final of the Eurovision Song Contest 2011 was watched by an average of 9.54 million viewers in the United Kingdom with a market share of 40.4%, more than double the previous year and making it the most watched Eurovision Song Contest final since 1999. After the contest, "I Can" entered the top ten iTunes download charts in several European countries.
