= Slovenia in the Eurovision Song Contest 2011 =

- Eurovision Song Contest 2011
- Participating broadcaster: Radiotelevizija Slovenija (RTVSLO)
- Country: Slovenia
- Selection process: Evrovizijska Melodija 2011
- Selection date: 27 February 2011

Competing entry
- Song: "No One"
- Artist: Maja Keuc
- Songwriters: Matjaž Vlašič; Urša Vlašič

Placement
- Semi-final result: Qualified (3rd, 112 points)
- Final result: 13th, 96 points

Participation chronology

Slovenia was represented at the Eurovision Song Contest 2011 with the song "No One", written by Matjaž Vlašič and Urša Vlašič, and performed by Maja Keuc. The Slovene participating broadcaster, Radiotelevizija Slovenija (RTVSLO), organised the national final Evrovizijska Melodija 2011 in order to select its entry for the contest. Ten entries competed in the national final where the winner was selected over two rounds of voting. In the first round, the top two entries were selected by a three-member jury panel. In the second round, "Vanilija" performed by Maja Keuc was selected as the winner entirely by a public vote. The song was later translated from Slovene to English for the Eurovision Song Contest and was titled "No One".

Slovenia was drawn to compete in the second semi-final of the Eurovision Song Contest which took place on 12 May 2011. Performing during the show in position 13, "No One" was announced among the top 10 entries of the second semi-final and therefore qualified to compete in the final on 14 May. It was later revealed that Slovenia placed third out of the 19 participating countries in the semi-final with 112 points. In the final, Slovenia performed in position 20 and placed thirteenth out of the 25 participating countries, scoring 96 points.

== Background ==
Prior to the 2011 contest, Radiotelevizija Slovenija (RTVSLO) had participated in the Eurovision Song Contest representing Slovenia sixteen times since its first entry in 1993. Its highest placing in the contest, to this point, has been seventh place, achieved on two occasions: in 1995 with the song "Prisluhni mi" performed by Darja Švajger and in 2001 with the song "Energy" performed by Nuša Derenda. The country's only other top ten result was achieved in 1997 when Tanja Ribič performing "Zbudi se" placed tenth. Since the introduction of semi-finals to the format of the contest in 2004, Slovenia had thus far only managed to qualify to the final on one occasion. In 2010, "Narodnozabavni rock" performed by Ansambel Žlindra and Kalamari failed to qualify to the final.

As part of its duties as participating broadcaster, RTVSLO organises the selection of its entry in the Eurovision Song Contest and broadcasts the event in the country. The broadcaster confirmed its participation in the 2011 contest on 9 November 2011. RTVSLO has traditionally selected its entry through a national final entitled Evrovizijska Melodija (EMA), which has been produced with variable formats. For 2011, the broadcaster opted to organise Evrovizijska Melodija 2011 (EMA 2011) to select its entry.

== Before Eurovision ==
=== EMA 2011 ===
EMA 2011 was the 16th edition of the Slovenian national final format Evrovizijska Melodija (EMA), used by RTV Slovenija to select Slovenia's entry for the Eurovision Song Contest 2011. The competition took place at the RTV Slovenija Studio 1 in Ljubljana, hosted by Klemen Slakonja and was broadcast on TV SLO 1, Radio Val 202, Radio Maribor and online via the broadcaster's website rtvslo.si as well as the official Eurovision Song Contest website eurovision.tv.

==== Format ====
Ten songs competed in a televised show where the winner was selected over two rounds of voting. In the first round, a three-member expert jury selected two finalists out of the ten competing songs to proceed to a superfinal. Each member of the expert jury assigned a score of 1 (lowest score) to 5 (highest score) to each song with the top two being determined by the songs that receive the highest overall scores when the jury votes are combined. Ties were broken by giving priority to the song(s) that achieved a higher number of top scores (5), which would be followed by each juror indicating their preferred song should a tie still have persisted. In the superfinal, public televoting exclusively determined the winner. In case of technical problems with the televote, the jury would have voted to determine the winner in a similar process as in the first round of the competition.

==== Competing entries ====
An expert committee consisting of editors for the entertainment programme of RTV Slovenija nominated ten artists to be directly invited by the broadcaster for the competition. The artists selected the composers for their entries in consultation with RTV Slovenija. The competing artists were announced on 20 January 2011. Among the competing artists was former Slovenian Eurovision contestant Omar Naber who represented Slovenia in 2005.

==== Final ====
EMA 2011 took place on 27 February 2011. In addition to the performances of the competing entries, Maestro Dance Crew, 1995 and 1999 Slovenian Eurovision entrant Darja Švajger and 2006 Croatian Eurovision entrant Severina performed as guests. The winner was selected over two rounds of voting. In the first round, a three-member jury panel selected two entries to proceed to the second round. The jury consisted of Švajger, Severina and Mojca Mavec (journalist and television presenter). In the second round, a public televote selected "Vanilija" performed by Maja Keuc as the winner.

Final – 27 February 2011
R/O	Artist	Song	Songwriter(s)	Result
1	Rock Partyzani	"Time for Revolution"	Aleš Klinar	—N/a
2	Tabu	"Moje luči"	Tomaž Trup, Iztok Melanšek	—N/a
3	Nina Pušlar	"Bilo lepo bi"	Martin Štibernik, Dejan Radičevič	—N/a
4	Maja Keuc	"Vanilija"	Matjaž Vlašič, Urša Vlašič	Advanced
5	Feliks Langus	"Disko raj"	Matej Mršnik, Anže Langus, Alen Steržaj	—N/a
6	LeeLooJamais	"Slovenka"	LeeLooJamais, Sašo Pipič	—N/a
7	April	"Ladadidej"	Raay, Erika Mager, Franci Tepina	Advanced
8	Sylvain, Mike Vale feat. Hannah Mancini	"Ti si tisti"	Mike Vale, Hannah Mancini, Anze Palka	—N/a
9	Time to Time	"Pravi čas"	Tomaž Kozlevčar, Nino Kozlevčar, Samo Kozlevčar, Andrej Rozman	—N/a
10	Omar Naber	"Bistvo skrito je očem"	Omar Naber, Jure Golobič, Eva Breznikar	—N/a

Superfinal – 27 February 2011
R/O	Artist	Song	Televote	Place
1	April	"Ladadidej"	11,993	2
2	Maja Keuc	"Vanilija"	28,908	1

=== Preparation ===
Following Maja Keuc's win at EMA 2011, the singer revealed that "Vanilija" would likely be translated from Slovene to English for the Eurovision Song Contest. On 9 April, the English version "No One" was presented via the premiere of the official music video, directed by i3 and filmed in the woods in the Ljubljana Zoo, during the TV SLO1 programme Spet doma.

=== Promotion ===
Maja Keuc made several appearances across Europe to specifically promote "No One" as the Slovenian Eurovision entry. On 8 April, Maja Keuc performed during the BHT 1 show Konačno petak in Bosnia and Herzegovina. On 9 April, Keuc performed during the Eurovision in Concert event which was held at the Club Air venue in Amsterdam, Netherlands and hosted by Cornald Maas, Esther Hart and Sascha Korf. Maja Keuc also took part in promotional activities in Greece and Macedonia in late April.

== At Eurovision ==
According to Eurovision rules, all nations with the exceptions of the host country and the "Big Five" (France, Germany, Italy, Spain and the United Kingdom) are required to qualify from one of two semi-finals in order to compete for the final; the top ten countries from each semi-final progress to the final. The European Broadcasting Union (EBU) split up the competing countries into six different pots based on voting patterns from previous contests, with countries with favourable voting histories put into the same pot. On 17 January 2011, an allocation draw was held which placed each country into one of the two semi-finals, as well as which half of the show they would perform in. Slovenia was placed into the second semi-final, to be held on 12 May 2011, and was scheduled to perform in the second half of the show. The running order for the semi-finals was decided through another draw on 16 January 2011 and Slovenia was set to perform in position 13, following the entry from Israel and before the entry from Romania.

In Slovenia, the semi-finals were televised on TV SLO 2 and the final was televised on TV SLO 1. All shows featured commentary by Andrej Hofer. The Slovenian spokesperson, who announced the Slovenian votes during the final, was Klemen Slakonja.

=== Semi-final ===
Maja Keuc took in technical rehearsals on 4 and 8 May, followed by dress rehearsals on 11 and 12 May. This included the jury show on 12 May where the professional juries of each country watched and voted on the competing entries.

The Slovenian performance featured Maja Keuc performing in a black outfit containing real metal together with four backing vocalists. The performance also included Keuc and her backing vocalists performing a choreographed routine. The LED screens displayed rotating flowers that changed colour and shade which remained dark until the chorus of the song. The four backing vocalists that joined Maja Keuc on stage were: Ana Bezjak, Katja Koren, Martina Majerle and Sandra Feketija. Majerle previously represented Slovenia in the Eurovision Song Contest 2009 together with the group Quartissimo where they failed to qualify to the grand final of the contest with the song "Love Symphony".

At the end of the show, Slovenia was announced as having finished in the top ten and subsequently qualifying for the grand final. It was later revealed that the Slovenia placed third in the semi-final, receiving a total of 112 points.

=== Final ===
Shortly after the second semi-final, a winners' press conference was held for the ten qualifying countries. As part of this press conference, the qualifying artists took part in a draw to determine the running order of the final. This draw was done in the order the countries appeared in the semi-final running order. Slovenia was drawn to perform in position 20, following the entry from Azerbaijan and before the entry from Iceland.

Maja Keuc once again took part in dress rehearsals on 13 and 14 May before the final, including the jury final where the professional juries cast their final votes before the live show. Maja Keuc performed a repeat of her semi-final performance during the final on 14 May. Slovenia placed thirteenth in the final, scoring 96 points.

=== Voting ===
Voting during the three shows involved each country awarding points from 1–8, 10 and 12 as determined by a combination of 50% national jury and 50% televoting. Each nation's jury consisted of five music industry professionals who are citizens of the country they represent. This jury judged each entry based on: vocal capacity; the stage performance; the song's composition and originality; and the overall impression by the act. In addition, no member of a national jury was permitted to be related in any way to any of the competing acts in such a way that they cannot vote impartially and independently.

Below is a breakdown of points awarded to Slovenia and awarded by Slovenia in the second semi-final and grand final of the contest. The nation awarded its 12 points to Bosnia and Herzegovina in the semi-final and the final of the contest.

==== Points awarded to Slovenia ====
Points awarded to Slovenia (Semi-final 2)
Score	Country
12 points	Bosnia and Herzegovina
10 points	Macedonia; Romania
8 points	Austria; Bulgaria; Denmark; Netherlands; Slovakia
7 points	Cyprus
6 points	Ireland; Israel
5 points	Estonia; France
4 points	Latvia; Moldova
3 points	Germany
2 points	
1 point	

Points awarded to Slovenia (Final)
Score	Country
12 points	Bosnia and Herzegovina; Croatia
10 points	Macedonia; Serbia
8 points	
7 points	Denmark
6 points	Cyprus; Hungary
5 points	Russia
4 points	Romania
3 points	Austria; Israel; Latvia; Malta
2 points	Estonia; Ireland; Netherlands; Turkey
1 point	Germany; Portugal; San Marino; Slovakia

==== Points awarded by Slovenia ====
Points awarded by Slovenia (Semi-final 2)
Score	Country
12 points	Bosnia and Herzegovina
10 points	Denmark
8 points	Macedonia
7 points	Austria
6 points	Ukraine
5 points	Sweden
4 points	Bulgaria
3 points	Slovakia
2 points	Belgium
1 point	Ireland

Points awarded by Slovenia (Final)
Score	Country
12 points	Bosnia and Herzegovina
10 points	Serbia
8 points	Denmark
7 points	Germany
6 points	Ukraine
5 points	Austria
4 points	Sweden
3 points	Italy
2 points	Spain
1 point	United Kingdom
