= France in the Eurovision Song Contest 2011 =

- Eurovision Song Contest 2011
- Participating broadcaster: France Télévisions
- Country: France
- Selection process: Internal selection
- Announcement date: Artist: 4 February 2011; Song: 7 March 2011

Competing entry
- Song: "Sognu"
- Artist: Amaury Vassili
- Songwriters: Daniel Moyne; Quentin Bachelet; Jean-Pierre Marcellesi; Julie Miller

Placement
- Final result: 15th, 82 points

Participation chronology

France was represented at the Eurovision Song Contest 2011 with the song "Sognu" written by Daniel Moyne, Quentin Bachelet and Jean-Pierre Marcellesi, and performed by Amaury Vassili. The French broadcaster France Télévisions in collaboration with the television channel France 3 internally selected the French entry for the 2011 contest in Düsseldorf, Germany. Amaury Vassili was officially announced by France 3 as the French entrant on 4 February 2011 and later the song was presented to the public as the contest entry during a live performance by Vassili on 7 March 2011 during the France 3 programme Chabada.

As a member of the "Big Five", France automatically qualified to compete in the final of the Eurovision Song Contest. Performing in position 11, France placed fifteenth out of the 25 participating countries with 82 points.

== Background ==
Prior to the 2011 contest, France had participated in the Eurovision Song Contest fifty-three times since its debut as one of seven countries to take part in 1956. France first won the contest in 1958 with "Dors, mon amour" performed by André Claveau. In the 1960s, they won three times, with "Tom Pillibi" performed by Jacqueline Boyer in 1960, "Un premier amour" performed by Isabelle Aubret in 1962 and "Un jour, un enfant" performed by Frida Boccara, who won in 1969 in a four-way tie with the Netherlands, Spain and the United Kingdom. France's fifth victory came in 1977, when Marie Myriam won with the song "L'oiseau et l'enfant". France have also finished second four times, with Paule Desjardins in 1957, Catherine Ferry in 1976, Joëlle Ursull in 1990 and Amina in 1991, who lost out to Sweden's Carola in a tie-break. In the 21st century, France has had less success, only making the top ten three times, with Natasha St-Pier finishing fourth in 2001, Sandrine François finishing fifth in 2002 and Patricia Kaas finishing eighth in 2009. In 2010, the nation finished in twelfth place with the song "Allez Ola Olé" performed by Jessy Matador.

The French national broadcaster, France Télévisions, broadcasts the event within France and delegates the selection of the nation's entry to the television channel France 3. France 3 confirmed that France would participate in the 2011 Eurovision Song Contest on 6 December 2010. The French broadcaster had used both national finals and internal selection to choose the French entry in the past. From 2008 to 2010, the broadcaster opted to internally select the French entry, a procedure that was continued in order to select the 2011 entry despite earlier rumours of a national final being organised to select the French entry.

== Before Eurovision ==
=== Internal selection ===
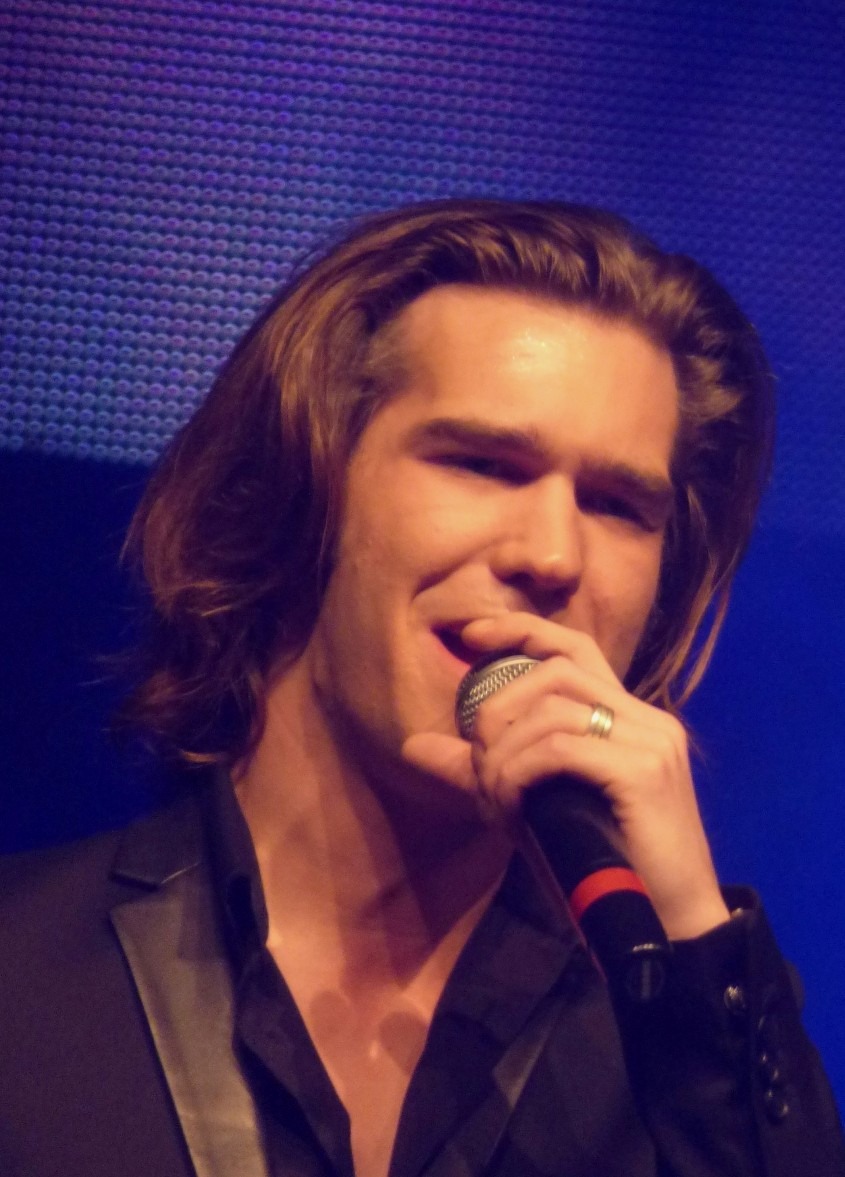
Amaury Vassili was internally selected to represent France in the Eurovision Song Contest 2011

France 3 announced in early 2011 that the French entry for the 2011 Eurovision Song Contest would be selected internally after requesting proposals from record companies. The organisation of the internal selection was headed by the artistic committee of France 3 consisting of programme director Pierre Sled, entertainment director Marie-Claire Mezerette and programme adviser Frédéric Valencak.

On 4 February 2011, France 3 announced that the French entry for the Eurovision Song Contest 2011 would be "Sonniu" performed by Amaury Vassili. The song was written by Daniel Moyne, Quentin Bachelet and Jean-Pierre Marcellesi and was performed entirely in Corsican. France 3 had initially selected the song "Maria", which had already been released as a single from Vassili's forthcoming album Canterò, but it was later replaced as the song had been publicly performed in July 2010. In regards to the selected artist, Pierre Sled stated: "Our choice was driven by the desire to promote a young talented artist representing the best of the French music and its diversity. That's why we quickly agreed an opera singer was the most elegant option. Amaury is an angel of music with a powerful voice. Without any hesitation, he was definitely the perfect choice." The artistic committee considered two artists, Amaury Vassili and Anggun, before finalising their decision internally. The entry, later retitled as "Sognu", was presented to the public on 7 March 2011 during the France 3 programme Chabada, hosted by Daniela Lumbroso.

== At Eurovision ==
According to Eurovision rules, all nations with the exceptions of the host country and the "Big Five" (France, Germany, Italy, Spain and the United Kingdom) are required to qualify from one of two semi-finals in order to compete for the final; the top ten countries from each semi-final progress to the final. As a member of the "Big Five", France automatically qualified to compete in the final on 14 May 2011. In addition to their participation in the final, France is also required to broadcast and vote in one of the two semi-finals. During the semi-final allocation draw on 17 January 2011, France was assigned to broadcast and vote in the second semi-final on 12 May 2011.

In France, the two semi-finals was broadcast on France Ô with commentary by Audrey Chauveau and Bruno Berberes, while the final was broadcast on France 3 with commentary by Laurent Boyer and Catherine Lara, as well as via radio on France Bleu with commentary by Fred Musa and Éric Mazet. The French spokesperson, who announced the French votes during the final, was Cyril Féraud.

=== Final ===
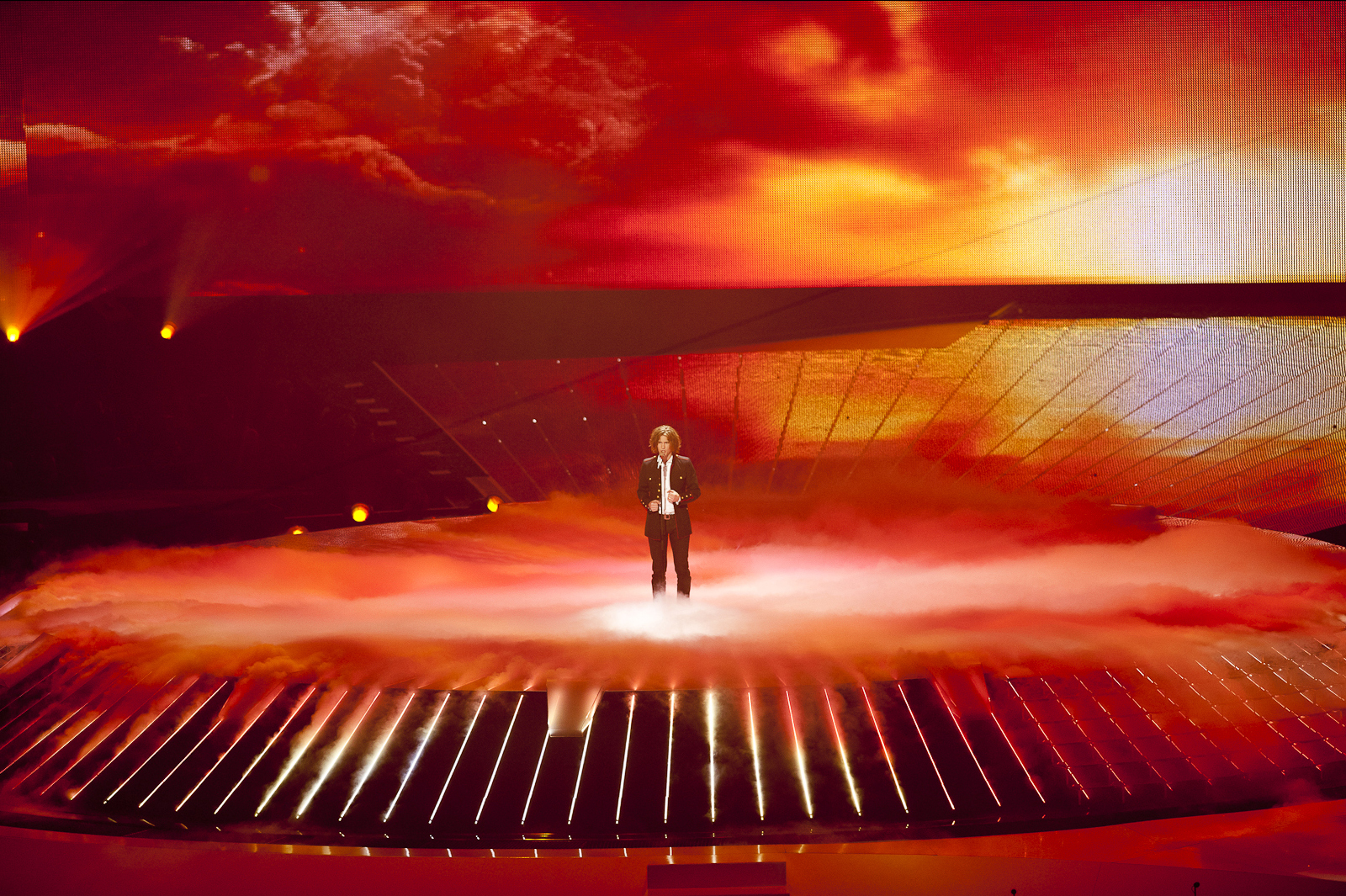
Amaury Vassili performing during the final

Amaury Vassili took part in technical rehearsals on 7 and 8 May, followed by dress rehearsals on 11 and 12 May. This included the jury final on 11 May where the professional juries of each country watched and voted on the competing entries. The running order for the semi-finals and final was decided by through another draw on 15 March 2011 and France was subsequently placed to perform in position 11, following the entry from Russia and before the entry from Italy. On the day of the grand final, bookmakers considered France the most likely country to win the competition.

The French performance featured Amaury Vassili on stage alone dressed in a black suit with red stripes and golden buttons with a white shirt. The LED screen of the stage began with a nightly scene with blue and white clouds, which later changed to a dawn scenery with red and orange colours with the sun appearing at the conclusion of the performance. The performance also featured smoke and pyrotechnic effects. France placed fifteenth in the final, scoring 82 points.

=== Voting ===
Voting during the three shows consisted of 50 percent public televoting and 50 percent from a jury deliberation. The jury consisted of five music industry professionals who were citizens of the country they represent. This jury was asked to judge each contestant based on: vocal capacity; the stage performance; the song's composition and originality; and the overall impression by the act. In addition, no member of a national jury could be related in any way to any of the competing acts in such a way that they cannot vote impartially and independently.

Following the release of the full split voting by the EBU after the conclusion of the competition, it was revealed that France had placed fifteenth with the public televote and twelfth with the jury vote. In the public vote, France scored 76 points and in the jury vote the nation scored 90 points.

Below is a breakdown of points awarded to France and awarded by France in the second semi-final and grand final of the contest. The nation awarded its 12 points to Sweden in the semi-final and to Spain in the final of the contest.

==== Points awarded to France ====
Points awarded to France (Final)
Score	Country
12 points	Belgium; Greece
10 points	Spain
8 points	
7 points	Cyprus
6 points	Croatia
5 points	Armenia; Ukraine
4 points	Bosnia and Herzegovina; Finland
3 points	Russia; San Marino
2 points	Albania; Georgia; Moldova; Portugal
1 point	Italy; Latvia; Malta

==== Points awarded by France ====
Points awarded by France (Semi-final 2)
Score	Country
12 points	Sweden
10 points	Bosnia and Herzegovina
8 points	Romania
7 points	Israel
6 points	Belgium
5 points	Slovenia
4 points	Estonia
3 points	Bulgaria
2 points	Denmark
1 point	Austria

Points awarded by France (Final)
Score	Country
12 points	Spain
10 points	Sweden
8 points	Italy
7 points	Denmark
6 points	Azerbaijan
5 points	Bosnia and Herzegovina
4 points	Moldova
3 points	Germany
2 points	Hungary
1 point	United Kingdom
