= Denmark in the Eurovision Song Contest 2011 =

- Eurovision Song Contest 2011
- Participating broadcaster: Danmarks Radio (DR)
- Country: Denmark
- Selection process: Dansk Melodi Grand Prix 2011
- Selection date: 26 February 2011

Competing entry
- Song: "New Tomorrow"
- Artist: A Friend in London
- Songwriters: Lise Cabble; Jakob Schack Glæsner

Placement
- Semi-final result: Qualified (2nd, 135 points)
- Final result: 5th, 134 points

Participation chronology

Denmark was represented at the Eurovision Song Contest 2011 with the song "New Tomorrow" written by Lise Cabble and Jakob Glæsner. The song was performed by the band A Friend in London. The Danish broadcaster DR organised the national final Dansk Melodi Grand Prix 2011 in order to select the Danish entry for the 2011 contest in Düsseldorf, Germany. Ten songs competed in a televised show where the winner was selected over three rounds of voting. The results of the first round were decided upon through the combination of jury voting and public voting while the results in the second and third round were determined solely by public televoting. "New Tomorrow" performed by A Friend in London was the winner after gaining the most public votes in the third round.

Denmark was drawn to compete in the second semi-final of the Eurovision Song Contest which took place on 12 May 2011. Performing during the show in position 18, "New Tomorrow" was announced among the top 10 entries of the second semi-final and therefore qualified to compete in the final on 14 May. It was later revealed that Denmark placed second out of the 19 participating countries in the semi-final with 135 points. In the final, Denmark performed in position 3 and placed fifth out of the 25 participating countries, scoring 134 points.

== Background ==
Prior to the 2011 contest, Denmark had participated in the Eurovision Song Contest thirty-nine times since its first entry in 1957. Denmark had won the contest, to this point, on two occasions: in 1963 with the song "Dansevise" performed by Grethe and Jørgen Ingmann, and in 2000 with the song "Fly on the Wings of Love" performed by Olsen Brothers. In the 2010 contest, "In a Moment like This" performed by Chanée and N'evergreen qualified Denmark to the final placing fourth.

The Danish national broadcaster, DR, broadcasts the event within Denmark and organises the selection process for the nation's entry. DR confirmed their intentions to participate at the 2011 Eurovision Song Contest on 4 June 2010. Denmark has selected all but one of their Eurovision entries through the national final Dansk Melodi Grand Prix. Along with their participation confirmation, the broadcaster announced that Dansk Melodi Grand Prix 2011 would be organised in order to select Denmark's entry for the 2011 contest.

== Before Eurovision ==
=== Dansk Melodi Grand Prix 2011 ===
Dansk Melodi Grand Prix 2011 was the 41st edition of Dansk Melodi Grand Prix, the music competition that selects Denmark's entries for the Eurovision Song Contest. The event was held on 26 February 2011 at the Ballerup Super Arena in Ballerup, hosted by Felix Smith and Lise Rønne and televised on DR1. The national final was watched by 1.661 million viewers in Denmark.

==== Format ====
Ten songs competed in one show where the winner was determined over three rounds of voting. In the first round, the top four songs based on the combination of votes from a public televote and a five-member jury panel qualified to the second round. In the second round, the four songs competed in two duels and the winner of each duel as determined exclusively by the public vote qualified to the final round, where the winner was determined again exclusively by the public vote. Viewers were able to vote via SMS.

The five-member jury panel was composed of:

- Bent Fabricius-Bjerre – composer
- Erann David Drori (Erann DD) – singer-songwriter
- Karen Rosenberg – singer
- Le Gammeltoft – radio host on DR P3
- Martin Brygmann – actor and composer

==== Competing entries ====
DR opened a submission period between 4 June 2010 and 27 September 2010 for artists and composers to submit their entries. The broadcaster received 663 entries during the submission period. A selection committee selected seven songs from the entries submitted to the broadcaster, while three of the participants were invited to compete based on editorial considerations. DR held a press meet and greet at the DR Byen in Copenhagen on 3 January 2011 where the competing artists and songs were announced and officially presented.

Artist	Song	Songwriter(s)	Selection
A Friend in London	"New Tomorrow"	Lise Cabble, Jakob Glæsner	Open submission
Anne Noa	"Sleepless"	John Gordon, Lene Dissing, Peter Bjørnskov	Invited by DR
Christopher Brandt	"Emma"	Christopher Brandt, Sisse Marie Søby	Open submission
Jeffrey	"Drømmen"	Lasse Lindorff, Svend Gudiksen, Daniel Fält, Kim Nowak-Zorde	Open submission
Jenny Berggren	"Let Your Heart Be Mine"	Jeppe Federspiel, Thomas G:son, Lars Sjelle	Invited by DR
Kat and Justin Hopkins	"Black and Blue"	Patric Johnson, Joakim Övrenius, Justin Hopkins	Open submission
Le Freak	"25 Hours a Day"	Erik Bernholm, Henrik Sethsson, Thomas G:son	Open submission
Lee Hutton	"Hollywood Girl"	Matilde Kühl, Sune Haansbæk, Ian Mack	Open submission
Sine Vig	"You'll Get Me Through"	Henrik Janson, Hanif Sabzevari	Open submission
Stine Kinck	"Hvad hjertet lever af"	Pharfar, Rasmus Allin, Fresh-I, Stine Kinck	Invited by DR

==== Final ====
The final took place on 26 February 2011. The running order was determined by DR and announced on 21 February 2011. In the first round of voting the top four advanced to the superfinal based on the votes of a five-member jury (50%) and a public televote (50%). In the second round, four songs faced off each other in two duels and a public vote selected the winners of each duel that advanced to the final round. In the final round, the winner, "New Tomorrow" performed by A Friend in London, was selected solely by a public vote.

In addition to the performances of the competing entries, Keld Heick, Danish Eurovision 1961 entrant Dario Campeotto and Danish Eurovision 1984, 1985 and 1988 entrant Kirsten Siggaard performed as the interval acts.

Final – 26 February 2011
R/O	Artist	Song	Result
1	Anne Noa	"Sleepless"	Qualified
2	Jenny Berggren	"Let Your Heart Be Mine"	—N/a
3	Jeffrey	"Drømmen"	—N/a
4	Le Freak	"25 Hours a Day"	Qualified
5	Sine Vig	"You'll Get Me Through"	—N/a
6	Stine Kinck	"Hvad hjertet lever af"	Qualified
7	Lee Hutton	"Hollywood Girl"	—N/a
8	Christopher Brandt	"Emma"	—N/a
9	Kat and Justin Hopkins	"Black and Blue"	—N/a
10	A Friend in London	"New Tomorrow"	Qualified

Second Round – 26 February 2011
Duel	R/O	Artist	Song	Result
I	1	Anne Noa	"Sleepless"	Qualified
I	2	Stine Kinck	"Hvad hjertet lever af"	—N/a
II	3	Le Freak	"25 Hours a Day"	—N/a
II	4	A Friend in London	"New Tomorrow"	Qualified

Final Round – 26 February 2011
R/O	Artist	Song	Place
1	Anne Noa	"Sleepless"	2
2	A Friend in London	"New Tomorrow"	1

== At Eurovision ==
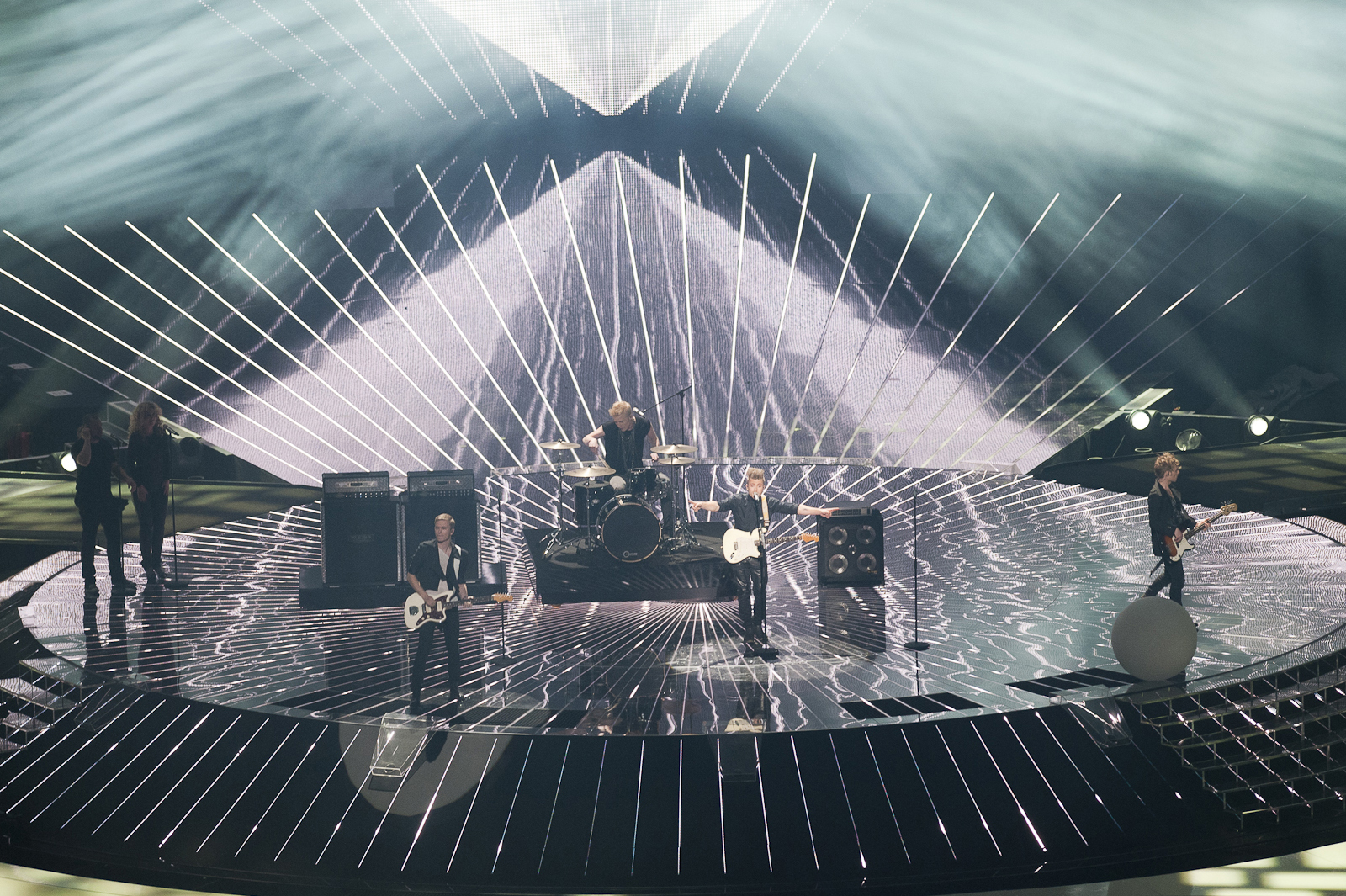
A Friend in London performing at the Eurovision Song Contest

All countries except the "Big Five" (France, Germany, Italy, Spain and the United Kingdom), and the host country, are required to qualify from one of two semi-finals in order to compete for the final; the top ten countries from each semi-final progress to the final. The European Broadcasting Union (EBU) split up the competing countries into six different pots based on voting patterns from previous contests, with countries with favourable voting histories put into the same pot. On 17 January 2011, a special allocation draw was held which placed each country into one of the two semi-finals, as well as which half of the show they would perform in. Denmark was placed into the second semi-final, to be held on 12 May 2011, and was scheduled to perform in the second half of the show. The running order for the semi-finals was decided through another draw on 15 March 2011 and Denmark was set to perform in position 18, following the entry from Latvia and before the entry from Ireland.

The two semi-finals and final were broadcast on DR1 and DR HD with commentary by Ole Tøpholm. DR appointed Lise Rønne as its spokesperson to announce the Danish votes during the final.

=== Semi-final ===
A Friend in London took part in technical rehearsals on 12 and 15 May, followed by dress rehearsals on 18 and 19 May. This included the jury show on 18 May where the professional juries of each country watched and voted on the competing entries.

The Danish performance featured the members of A Friend in London dressed in dark outfits and performing in a band set-up. During the bridge, lead singer Tim Schou kicked a large white ball from the stage and ran down the catwalk before returning back to the main stage and finishing the performance. The stage colours were predominantly white and orange and the LED screens displayed abstract white and black images. A Friend in London was joined by two backing vocalists on stage: Lone Strandsbjerg Baltzer and Tim McEwan.

At the end of the show, Denmark was announced as having finished in the top ten and subsequently qualifying for the grand final. It was later revealed that Denmark placed second in the semi-final, receiving a total of 135 points.

=== Final ===
Shortly after the second semi-final, a winners' press conference was held for the ten qualifying countries. As part of this press conference, the qualifying artists took part in a draw to determine the running order for the final. This draw was done in the order the countries were announced during the semi-final. Denmark was drawn to perform in position 3, following the entry from Bosnia and Herzegovina and before the entry from Lithuania.

A Friend in London once again took part in dress rehearsals on 13 and 14 May before the final, including the jury final where the professional juries cast their final votes before the live show. The band performed a repeat of their semi-final performance during the final on 14 May. At the conclusion of the voting, Denmark finished in fifth place with 134 points.

=== Voting ===
Voting during the three shows consisted of 50 percent public televoting and 50 percent from a jury deliberation. The jury consisted of five music industry professionals who were citizens of the country they represent. This jury was asked to judge each contestant based on: vocal capacity; the stage performance; the song's composition and originality; and the overall impression by the act. In addition, no member of a national jury could be related in any way to any of the competing acts in such a way that they cannot vote impartially and independently.

Following the release of the full split voting by the EBU after the conclusion of the competition, it was revealed that Denmark had placed eighteenth with the public televote and third with the jury vote in the final. In the public vote, Denmark scored 61 points, while with the jury vote, Denmark scored 168 points. In the second semi-final, Denmark placed fourth with the public televote with 115 points and second with the jury vote, scoring 129 points.

Below is a breakdown of points awarded to Denmark and awarded by Denmark in the second semi-final and grand final of the contest. The nation awarded its 12 points to Sweden in the semi-final and to Ireland in the final of the contest.

==== Points awarded to Denmark ====
Points awarded to Denmark (Semi-final 2)
Score	Country
12 points	Bulgaria; Ireland; Latvia; Sweden
10 points	Estonia; Germany; Israel; Slovenia
8 points	
7 points	Austria; Belgium; Netherlands
6 points	Cyprus
5 points	Romania
4 points	Belarus
3 points	Slovakia; Ukraine
2 points	France; Moldova
1 point	Bosnia and Herzegovina

Points awarded to Denmark (Final)
Score	Country
12 points	Iceland; Ireland; Netherlands
10 points	Estonia; Israel; Sweden
8 points	Slovenia
7 points	Bulgaria; France; Norway
6 points	Germany; Latvia; Slovakia
5 points	Malta; United Kingdom
4 points	San Marino
3 points	Cyprus; Poland
2 points	
1 point	Belarus

==== Points awarded by Denmark ====
Points awarded by Denmark (Semi-final 2)
Score	Country
12 points	Sweden
10 points	Ireland
8 points	Slovenia
7 points	Bosnia and Herzegovina
6 points	Romania
5 points	Austria
4 points	Bulgaria
3 points	Estonia
2 points	Latvia
1 point	Ukraine

Points awarded by Denmark (Final)
Score	Country
12 points	Ireland
10 points	Sweden
8 points	Germany
7 points	Slovenia
6 points	Iceland
5 points	Finland
4 points	Romania
3 points	United Kingdom
2 points	Estonia
1 point	Austria
