= Turkey in the Eurovision Song Contest 2011 =

- Eurovision Song Contest 2011
- Participating broadcaster: Türkiye Radyo ve Televizyon Kurumu (TRT)
- Country: Turkey
- Selection process: Internal selection
- Announcement date: Artist: 1 January 2011; Song: 25 February 2011

Competing entry
- Song: "Live It Up"
- Artist: Yüksek Sadakat
- Songwriters: Kutlu Özmakinacı; Ergün Arsal

Placement
- Semi-final result: Failed to qualify (13th)

Participation chronology

Turkey was represented at the Eurovision Song Contest 2011 with the song "Live It Up", composed by Kutlu Özmakinacı, with lyrics by Ergün Arsal, and performed by the band Yüksek Sadakat. The Turkish participating broadcaster, Türkiye Radyo ve Televizyon Kurumu (TRT), internally selected its entry for the contest.

Turkey was drawn to compete in the first semi-final of the Eurovision Song Contest which took place on 10 May 2011. Performing during the show in position 5, "Live It Up" was not announced among the top 10 entries of the first semi-final and therefore failed to qualify to compete in the final on 14 May. This marked the first time that Turkey failed to qualify to the final of the Eurovision Song Contest since the introduction of semi-finals in 2004. It was later revealed that Turkey placed 13th out of the 19 participating countries in the semi-final with 47 points.

This was the penultimate entry from Turkey in the Eurovision Song Contest.

== Before Eurovision ==
=== Internal selection ===
In October 2010, Turkish Eurovision website eurovisiondream.com launched an online petition to persuade Türkiye Radyo ve Televizyon Kurumu (TRT) to hold a national final instead of an internal selection, aiming to reach 10,000 signatures in two weeks. However, TRT announced on 1 January 2011 that it had selected the band Yüksek Sadakat to represent Turkey in Düsseldorf. Prior to the announcement of Yüksek Sadakat as the Turkish representative, rumoured artists in Turkish media included Atiye, Ayna, Hande Yener, Hayko Cepkin, and Şebnem Ferah. Three songs, all written in English, were submitted by the band to the broadcaster in late January 2011 and a selection committee selected "Live It Up" as the song they would perform at the contest.

On 25 February 2011, "Live It Up" was presented to the public during a press conference that took place at the TRT Tepebaşı Studios in Istanbul, broadcast on TRT 1 as well as online via the official Eurovision Song Contest website eurovision.tv. The song was written by members of the band Kutlu Özmakinacı and Ergün Arsal.

== At Eurovision ==
Turkey competed in the first semi-final on 10 May 2011 but did not qualify for the final, placing 13th with 47 points. The public awarded Turkey 10th place with 54 points and the jury awarded 12th place with 58 points. This was the first and as of 2012, only time that Turkey did not make it to the final since the semi-final system was introduced in 2004. It was the first year that Turkey wasn't present in a Eurovision final since 1994, when they had been relegated due to a poor result in 1993.

=== Voting ===
==== Points awarded to Turkey ====
Points awarded to Turkey (Semi-final 1)
Score	Country
12 points	Albania; Azerbaijan
10 points	San Marino
8 points	
7 points	
6 points	
5 points	Switzerland
4 points	
3 points	Georgia
2 points	Malta; Russia
1 point	United Kingdom

==== Points awarded by Turkey ====
Points awarded by Turkey (Semi-final 1)
Score	Country
12 points	Azerbaijan
10 points	Georgia
8 points	Albania
7 points	Armenia
6 points	Hungary
5 points	San Marino
4 points	Greece
3 points	Russia
2 points	Malta
1 point	Finland

Points awarded by Turkey (Final)
Score	Country
12 points	Azerbaijan
10 points	Bosnia and Herzegovina
8 points	Georgia
7 points	Ukraine
6 points	United Kingdom
5 points	Romania
4 points	Sweden
3 points	Germany
2 points	Slovenia
1 point	Austria
