= Die Mayerin =

Austrian singer and songwriter (born 1984)

- Born: Ulrike Maria Koller; 23 December 1984 (age 41); Eisenstadt, Burgenland, Austria
- Other name: Mia Koller
- Education: University of Vienna
- Occupations: Singer; songwriter; psychologist
- Years active: 2006–present
- Musical career
- Instrument: Vocals

Ulrike Maria Mayer (née Koller; born 23 December 1984), known professionally as Die Mayerin, is an Austrian singer, songwriter and psychologist.

== Early life and education ==
Ulrike Maria Koller was born on 23 December 1984 in Eisenstadt, Burgenland. After elementary school in Wimpassing an der Leitha, Koller attended the Gymnasium of the Diocese of Eisenstadt Wolfgarten, where she graduated in 2003. She then studied psychology at the University of Vienna, graduating in 2011 with a master's degree in psychology with a thesis on the subject of "The Influence of Tomatis Therapy on Spatial Imagination." After completing her studies, she established her own practice.

== Career ==
From 2006 to 2011, Koller was the lead singer of the group BandWG under the moniker Mia Koller. With her song "10 Sekunden Glück" (10 Seconds of Happiness) she participated in the ORF show Guten Morgen Düsseldorf, the Austrian preliminary round for the Eurovision Song Contest 2011, and performed as the opening act for Ich + Ich, Silbermond, and Juli.

When she married in 2016, she changed her surname from Koller to Mayer. At her wedding, she sang the song "Between Heaven and Earth," which she had written, for her husband, and was subsequently encouraged to make music again. With her debut album "Sternschnuppn," she entered the Austrian album charts in March 2018 under the stage name "Die Mayerin." She dedicated the ballad "So wias is" (As it is) to her deceased grandparents, and actors Gertrud Roll and Erich Schleyer appeared in the video for the song. Die Mayerin writes the lyrics for her songs, sung in dialect, herself, and composes them together with her guitarist Alexander Sieber and her Berlin producer Marcus Gorstein. The stage name "die Mayerin" is derived from her surname.

In July 2018, Die Mayerin appeared on ORF's Starnacht am Wörthersee and in January 2019 at the Wenn die Musi spielt Winter Open Air. In June 2019, she performed at the Donauinselfest. In September 2019, Die Mayerin performed at the ORF's Starnacht aus der Wachau (Star Night from the Wachau region), and in December 2019 at the ORF program Zauberhafte Weihnacht im Land der Stillen Nacht (Magic Christmas in the Land of Silent Night).

At the end of March 2020, Die Mayerin released the single "Tanzen im Regen" (Dancing in the Rain) from her second album Libellen. For the album, she worked again with her former colleagues Markus Weiß and Bern Wagner of BandWG. In June 2020, she presented "Tanzen im Regen" as part of the ORF program Österreich blüht auf – Die Natur im Garten and in July 2020, "Töchter von Eden" in the ORF/MDR program Stars am Wörthersee. In June 2021, she released the single "Dahoam", which she presented alongside the song "Heut und hier" as part of the ORF/MDR program "Die Gartenparty der Stars". Dahoam was also used as music for an advertising campaign by Nah & Frisch. In May 2022, she was again a guest on the MDR/ORF program "Die Gartenparty der Stars" with "Schweben" and at the beginning of June 2022 at the "Starnacht am Neusiedler See". In February 2023, she was one of the four candidates in the celebrity edition of the Millionenshow. At the end of May 2023, she presented her third album Liebe at the KUZ in Eisenstadt.

== Personal life ==
Die Mayerin is married and the mother of two children (born 2012 and 2014). She lives in Wimpassing an der Leitha in Burgenland. In the ORF city portrait My Eisenstadt (2021), she reported on her youth in Eisenstadt.

== Discography ==
=== Studio albums ===
Title	Details	Peak chart positions
Title	Details	AUT
Sternschnuppn	Released: 23 February 2018; Label: Son Music; Format: CD, download	4
Libellen	Released: 5 June 2020; Label: Son Music; Format: CD, download	2
Liebe	Released: 23 June 2023; Label: Son Music; Format: CD, download	3
"—" denotes an album that did not chart or was not released in that territory.

=== Singles ===
- 2020: Tanzen im Regen
- 2021: Dahoam
- 2022: Wunder
- 2023: Die Ersten

== Awards and nominations ==
Year	Award	Category	Work	Result	Ref.
2019	Amadeus Austrian Music Awards	Schlager / Folk music	Herself	Won	
2021	Amadeus Austrian Music Awards	Schlager / Folk music	Herself	Nominated	
2024	Amadeus Austrian Music Awards	Songwriter of the Year	Die Ersten (with Michael Klimas)	Nominated	
