= Ireland in the Eurovision Song Contest 2011 =

- Eurovision Song Contest 2011
- Participating broadcaster: Raidió Teilifís Éireann (RTÉ)
- Country: Ireland
- Selection process: Eurosong 2011
- Selection date: 11 February 2011

Competing entry
- Song: "Lipstick"
- Artist: Jedward
- Songwriters: Dan Priddy; Lars Halvor Jensen; Martin Michael Larson

Placement
- Semi-final result: Qualified (8th, 68 points)
- Final result: 8th, 119 points

Participation chronology

Ireland was represented at the Eurovision Song Contest 2011 with the song "Lipstick", written by Dan Priddy, Lars Halvor Jensen, and Martin Michael Larson, and performed by the duo Jedward. The Irish participating broadcaster, Raidió Teilifís Éireann (RTÉ), organised the national final Eurosong 2011 in order to select its entry for the contest. Five songs faced the votes of six regional juries and a public televote, ultimately resulting in the selection of "Lipstick" performed by Jedward as the Irish Eurovision entry.

Ireland was drawn to compete in the second semi-final of the Eurovision Song Contest which took place on 12 May 2011. Performing as the closing entry during the show in position 19, "Lipstick" was announced among the top 10 entries of the second semi-final and therefore qualified to compete in the final on 14 May. It was later revealed that Ireland placed eighth out of the 19 participating countries in the semi-final with 68 points. In the final, Ireland performed in position 6 and placed eighth out of the 25 participating countries, scoring 119 points.

== Background ==
Prior to the 2011 contest, Raidió Teilifís Éireann (RTÉ) and its predecessor national broadcasters have participated in the Eurovision Song Contest representing Ireland forty-four times since RÉ's first entry in 1965. They have won the contest a record seven times in total. Their first win came in 1970, with "All Kinds of Everything" performed by Dana. Ireland holds the record for being the only country to win the contest three times in a row (in 1992, 1993, and 1994), as well as having the only three-time winner (Johnny Logan, who won in 1980 as a singer, 1987 as a singer-songwriter, and again in 1992 as a songwriter). In 2010, "It's for You" performed by Niamh Kavanagh, managed to qualify for the final and placed twenty-third.

As part of its duties as participating broadcaster, RTÉ organises the selection of its entry in the Eurovision Song Contest and broadcasts the event in the country. The broadcaster confirmed its intentions to participate in the 2011 contest on 3 November 2010. From 2008 to 2010, RTÉ had set up the national final Eurosong to choose both the song and performer to compete at Eurovision for Ireland, with both the public and regional jury groups involved in the selection. For the 2011 contest, it announced on 26 November 2010 the organisation of Eurosong 2011 to choose the artist and song. The competition format differed from the previous three years with a mentor system that involved five music professionals each selecting one entry for the competition, indicating the abandonment of the public entry submission process. In regards to the mentor system, Julian Vignoles, Irish Eurovision Head of Delegation, stated: "Given our mixed results in recent years, we felt it was our duty to look again at our selection procedure to see what method could improve Ireland's chances of winning on the Eurovision stage. Ireland has a vibrant and successful music industry and we want to find the best performer to represent our country. This year we have decided to suspend the open call for entries and instead harness the skills and experience of professionals in the Irish music business to source the talent and the song that has the potential to be a Eurovision winner. We are enlisting five people who each have proven success in different areas of the music industry so the public will have five strong entries to choose from in Eurosong 2011."

== Before Eurovision ==
=== Eurosong 2011 ===
Eurosong 2011 was the national final format developed by RTÉ in order to select its entry for the Eurovision Song Contest 2011. The competition was held on 11 February 2011 at the Studio 4 of RTÉ in Dublin, hosted by Ryan Tubridy and broadcast on RTÉ One during a special edition of The Late Late Show. The show was also broadcast online via the broadcaster's official website rte.ie and the official Eurovision Song Contest website eurovision.tv.

==== Competing entries ====
On 26 November 2010, RTÉ revealed the five music industry professionals that were invited to each select and mentor an entry for the competition: director of MCD and event producer Caroline Downey-Desmond, musical director and arranger David Hayes, composer and performer Liam Lawton, composer Ronan Hardiman and chairman of EMI Music Ireland Willie Kavanagh. The five finalists were announced between 28 January and 4 February 2011, while their songs were presented on 10 February 2011 during The Derek Mooney Show on RTÉ Radio 1.

Artist	Song	Songwriter(s)	Mentor
Bling	"Shine On"	Patrick Mahoney	Willie Kavanagh
Don Mescall	"Talking with Jennifer"	Ronan Hardiman, Don Mescall	Ronan Hardiman
Jedward	"Lipstick"	Dan Priddy, Lars Halvor Jensen, Martin Michael Larson	Caroline Downey-Desmond
Nikki Kavanagh	"Falling"	Christina Schilling, Camilla Gottschalck, Jonas Gladnikoff, Hanif Sabzevari	David Hayes
The Vard Sisters	"Send Me an Angel"	Liam Lawton	Liam Lawton

==== Final ====
The national final took place on 11 February 2011 and featured guest performances from former contest winners Niamh Kavanagh and Bucks Fizz as well as guest appearances from former contestant Brian Kennedy and former contest hosts Cynthia Ní Mhurchú, Gerry Ryan and Mary Kennedy. Following the combination of votes from six regional juries (2/3) and public televoting (1/3) which had a weighting equal to the votes of three juries, "Lipstick" performed by Jedward was selected as the winner.

Final – 11 February 2011
R/O	Artist	Song	Jury	Televote	Total	Place
1	Don Mescall	"Talking with Jennifer"	44	24	68	3
2	Jedward	"Lipstick"	62	36	98	1
3	Bling	"Shine On"	32	12	44	5
4	The Vard Sisters	"Send Me an Angel"	36	18	54	4
5	Nikki Kavanagh	"Falling"	66	30	96	2

Detailed Regional Jury Votes
R/O	Song	Waterford	Cork	Limerick	Galway	Sligo	Dublin	Total
1	"Talking with Jennifer"	6	6	4	10	10	8	44
2	"Lipstick"	10	10	12	8	12	10	62
3	"Shine On"	4	8	6	6	4	4	32
4	"Send Me an Angel"	8	4	8	4	6	6	36
5	"Falling"	12	12	10	12	8	12	66

== At Eurovision ==
According to Eurovision rules, all nations with the exceptions of the host country and the "Big Five" (France, Germany, Italy, Spain and the United Kingdom) are required to qualify from one of two semi-finals in order to compete for the final; the top ten countries from each semi-final progress to the final. The European Broadcasting Union (EBU) split up the competing countries into six different pots based on voting patterns from previous contests, with countries with favourable voting histories put into the same pot. On 17 January 2011, a special allocation draw was held which placed each country into one of the two semi-finals, as well as which half of the show they would perform in. Ireland was placed into the second semi-final, to be held on 12 May 2011, and was scheduled to perform in the second half of the show. The running order for the semi-finals was decided through another draw on 15 March 2011 and Ireland was set to perform last in position 19, following the entry from Denmark.

In Ireland, the semi-finals were broadcast on RTÉ Two and the final was broadcast on RTÉ One with commentary by Marty Whelan. The second semi-final and final were also broadcast via radio on RTÉ Radio 1 with commentary by Shay Byrne and Zbyszek Zalinski. The Irish spokesperson, who announced the Irish votes during the final, was Derek Mooney.

=== Semi-final ===
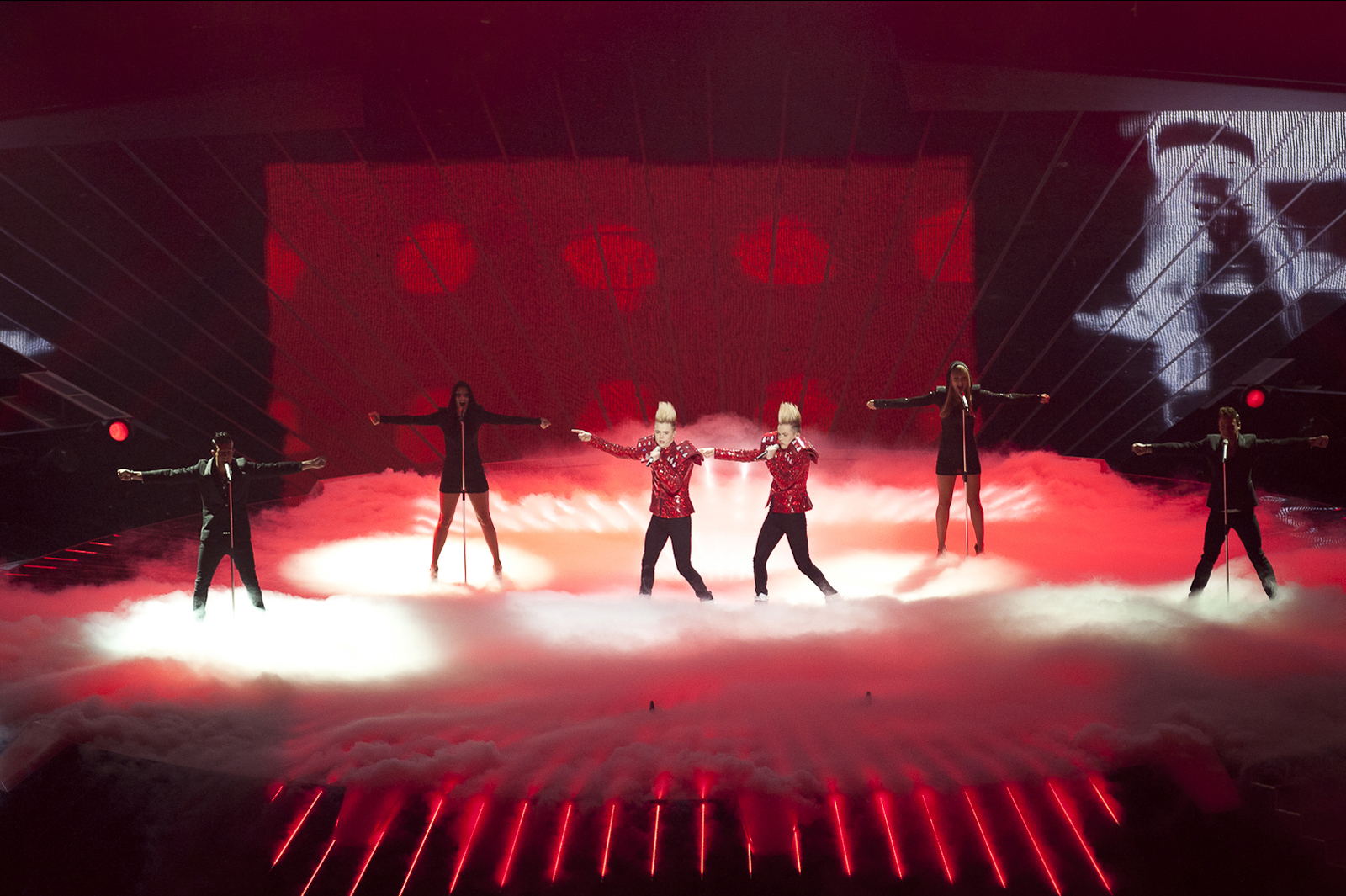
Jedward during a rehearsal before the second semi-final

Jedward took part in technical rehearsals on 4 and 8 May, followed by dress rehearsals on 11 and 12 May. This included the jury show on 11 May where the professional juries of each country watched and voted on the competing entries.

The Irish performance featured Jedward dressed in red sequence jackets with shoulder pads. The performance began with John Grimes performing the opening line of the song in the centre of the stage followed by Edward Grimes lying on the stage floor and performing the second line, with John later pulling Edward up and continuing the performance, which they concluded by tossing over. The LED screens displayed silhouettes of Jedward dancing in the background alternating with big red lips flashing, with the stage lighting being dominantly in red. Jedward was joined on stage by four backing vocalists: the co-composer of "Lipstick" Dan Priddy, David O'Connor, Leanne Moore and Morgan Deane.

At the end of the show, Ireland was announced as having finished in the top 10 and consequently qualifying for the grand final. It was later revealed that Ireland placed eighth in the semi-final, receiving a total of 68 points.

=== Final ===
Shortly after the second semi-final, a winners' press conference was held for the ten qualifying countries. As part of this press conference, the qualifying artists took part in a draw to determine the running order for the final and Ireland was drawn to perform in position 6, following the entry from Hungary and before the entry from Sweden.

Jedward once again took part in dress rehearsals on 13 and 14 May before the final, including the jury final where the professional juries cast their final votes before the live show. Jedward performed a repeat of his semi-final performance during the final on 14 May. Ireland placed eighth in the final, scoring 119 points and achieving Ireland's highest position in the contest since 2000.

=== Voting ===
Voting during the three shows consisted of 50 percent public televoting and 50 percent from a jury deliberation. The jury consisted of five music industry professionals who were citizens of the country they represent. This jury was asked to judge each contestant based on: vocal capacity; the stage performance; the song's composition and originality; and the overall impression by the act. In addition, no member of a national jury could be related in any way to any of the competing acts in such a way that they cannot vote impartially and independently.

Following the release of the full split voting by the EBU after the conclusion of the competition, it was revealed that Ireland had placed sixth with the public televote and tenth with the jury vote in the second semi-final. In the public vote, Ireland scored 78 points, while with the jury vote, Ireland scored 66 points. In the final, Ireland had placed tenth with the public televote and sixth with the jury vote. In the public vote, Ireland scored 101 points, while with the jury vote, Ireland scored 119 points.

Below is a breakdown of points awarded to Ireland and awarded by Ireland in the second semi-final and grand final of the contest, and the breakdown of the jury voting and televoting conducted during the two shows:

==== Points awarded to Ireland ====
Points awarded to Ireland (Semi-final 2)
Score	Country
12 points	
10 points	Denmark; Latvia; Sweden
8 points	Germany
7 points	Bulgaria
6 points	Romania
5 points	Belgium
4 points	
3 points	Bosnia and Herzegovina; Estonia
2 points	Slovakia; Ukraine
1 point	Netherlands; Slovenia

Points awarded to Ireland (Final)
Score	Country
12 points	Denmark; Sweden; United Kingdom
10 points	Finland; Latvia
8 points	Germany; Malta; Slovakia
7 points	Belgium; Spain
6 points	Portugal
5 points	Netherlands
4 points	Austria; Iceland
3 points	Bulgaria
2 points	Bosnia and Herzegovina
1 point	Poland

==== Points awarded by Ireland ====
Points awarded by Ireland (Semi-final 2)
Score	Country
12 points	Denmark
10 points	Estonia
8 points	Sweden
7 points	Latvia
6 points	Slovenia
5 points	Slovakia
4 points	Moldova
3 points	Romania
2 points	Austria
1 point	Bulgaria

Points awarded by Ireland (Final)
Score	Country
12 points	Denmark
10 points	Lithuania
8 points	Moldova
7 points	Estonia
6 points	United Kingdom
5 points	Italy
4 points	Sweden
3 points	Finland
2 points	Slovenia
1 point	Romania
