= Netherlands in the Eurovision Song Contest 2011 =

- Eurovision Song Contest 2011
- Participating broadcaster: Televisie Radio Omroep Stichting (TROS)
- Country: Netherlands
- Selection process: Artist: Internal selection Song: Nationaal Songfestival 2011
- Selection date: Artist: 15 July 2010; Song: 30 January 2011

Competing entry
- Song: "Never Alone"
- Artist: 3JS
- Songwriters: Jan Dulles; Jaap Kwakman; Jaap de Witte

Placement
- Semi-final result: Failed to qualify (19th)

Participation chronology

The Netherlands was represented at the Eurovision Song Contest 2011 with the song "Never Alone", written by Jan Dulles, Jaap Kwakman and Jaap de Witte, and performed by the band 3JS. The Dutch participating broadcaster, Televisie Radio Omroep Stichting (TROS), internally selected its representative. 3JS' appointment was announced on 15 July 2010, while the national final Nationaal Songfestival 2011 was organised in order to select the song. Five songs competed in the national final on 30 January 2011 where "Je vecht nooit alleen" was selected as the winning song following the combination of votes from a five-member jury panel and a public vote. The song was later translated from Dutch to English for the Eurovision Song Contest and was titled "Never Alone".

The Netherlands was drawn to compete in the second semi-final of the Eurovision Song Contest which took place on 12 May 2011. Performing during the show in position 3, "Never Alone" was not announced among top 10 entries of the second semi-final and therefore did not qualify to compete in the final. It was later revealed that the Netherlands placed nineteenth (last) out of the 19 participating countries in the semi-final with 13 points.

== Background ==
Prior to the 2011 contest, Televisie Radio Omroep Stichting (TROS) and its predecessor national broadcasters have participated in the Eurovision Song Contest representing the Netherlands fifty-one times since NTS début in 1956. They have won the contest four times: in 1957 with the song "Net als toen" performed by Corry Brokken; in 1959 with the song "'n Beetje" performed by Teddy Scholten; in 1969 as one of four countries to tie for first place with "De troubadour" performed by Lenny Kuhr; and finally in 1975 with "Ding-a-dong" performed by the group Teach-In. Following the introduction of semi-finals for the 2004 contest, the Netherlands had featured in only one final. The Dutch least successful result has been last place, which they have achieved on four occasions, most recently in the 1968 contest. The Netherlands has also received nul points on two occasions; in 1962 and 1963.

As part of its duties as participating broadcaster, TROS organises the selection of its entry in the Eurovision Song Contest and broadcasts the event in the country. The Dutch broadcaster has used various methods to select its entry in the past, such as the Nationaal Songfestival, a live televised national final to choose the performer, song or both to compete at Eurovision. However, internal selections have also been held on occasion. In 2010, TROS has internally selected the song, while Nationaal Songfestival was organised in order to select the artist for the contest. For 2011, the broadcaster opted to select the artist through an internal selection, while Nationaal Songfestival was continued to select the song.

== Before Eurovision ==
=== Artist selection ===
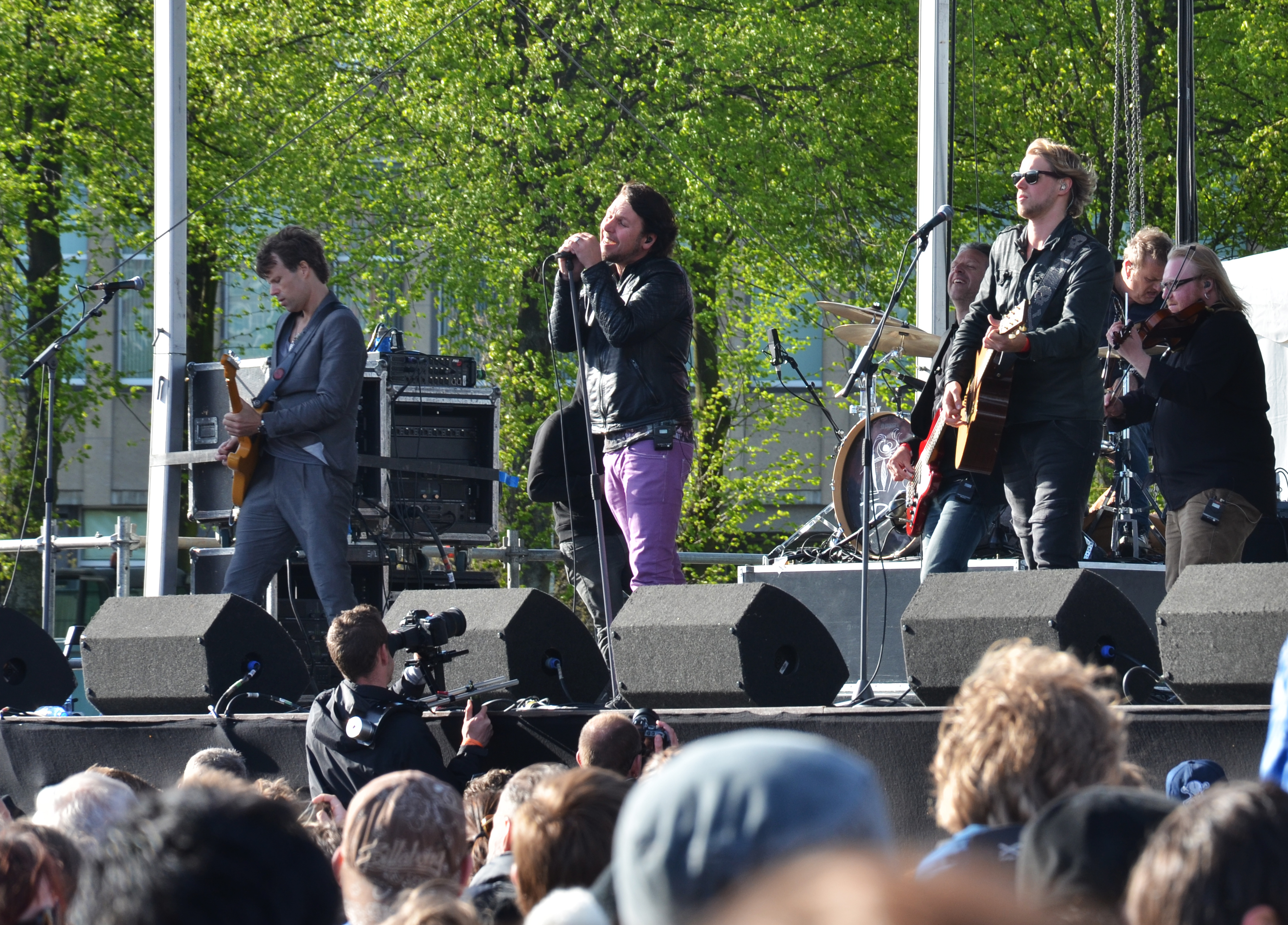
3JS was internally selected to represent the Netherlands in the Eurovision Song Contest 2011

Following Sieneke' failure to qualify to the final in 2010 with the song "Ik ben verliefd (Sha-la-lie)", TROS internally selected the artist for the Eurovision Song Contest 2011. On 14 July 2010, radio DJ Giel Beelen claimed that TROS had selected the band 3JS to represent the Netherlands at the 2011 contest. 3JS was confirmed as the Dutch entrant on 15 July 2010 during the Radio 2 programme Gouden Uren, hosted by Daniël Dekker. During the programme, it was revealed that their Eurovision song would be selected through the national final Nationaal Songfestival 2011.

=== Nationaal Songfestival 2011 ===
Five songs, all written by 3JS members Jan Dulles, Jaap Kwakman and Jaap de Witte, were submitted by the band for the competition and announced on 16 December 2010 during the Stadsradio Breda programme Eurovisie FM, hosted by Frank Mol. The final took place on 30 January 2011 at the Studio 21 in Hilversum, hosted by Yolanthe Sneijder-Cabau and was broadcast on Nederland 1 as well as streamed online via the official Eurovision Song Contest website eurovision.tv. All five competing songs were performed by 3JS and the winning song, "Je vecht nooit alleen", was selected by the 50/50 combination of a public televote and the votes of a five-member jury. The jury panel consisted of 2009 Dutch Eurovision entrant (as part of De Toppers) René Froger, producer Eric van Tijn, radio DJs Daniël Dekker and Annemieke Schollaardt, and 2008 Dutch Eurovision entrant Hind Laroussi. In addition to the performances of the competing songs, the show featured guest performances by past Dutch Eurovision entrants Anneke Grönloh (1964), Ben Cramer (1973), Marga Bult (1987), Justine Pelmelay (1989), Marlayne (1999), Esther Hart (2003) and Sieneke (2010). The national final was watched by 2.245 million viewers in the Netherlands with a market share of 30.9%.

Final – 30 January 2011
R/O	Song	Jury	Televote		Total	Place
R/O	Song	Jury	Percentage	Points	Total	Place
1	"Ga dan niet"	3	1.0%	1	4	3
2	"De stroom"	4	25.5%	4	8	2
3	"Toen ik jou vergat"	2	3.9%	2	4	3
4	"Weelderig waardeloos"	1	5.8%	3	4	3
5	"Je vecht nooit alleen"	5	63.8%	5	10	1

=== Preparation ===
On 5 March, Jan Dulles revealed during an interview on the Radio 2 programme En nu serieus, hosted by Christel Van Dyck and Peter Jan Hautekiet, that "Je vecht nooit alleen" would be performed in English at the Eurovision Song Contest, titled "Never Alone". The new version premiered on 11 March during Gouden Uren.

=== Promotion ===
In the lead up to the Eurovision Song Contest, 3JS' promotional activities occurred entirely within the Netherlands where they performed at live events, radio shows and talk shows. On 14 April, 3JS performed during the Eurovision in Concert event which was held at the Club Air venue in Amsterdam and hosted by Cornald Maas, Esther Hart and Sascha Korf.

== At Eurovision ==
All countries except the "Big Five" (France, Germany, Italy, Spain and the United Kingdom), and the host country, are required to qualify from one of two semi-finals in order to compete for the final; the top ten countries from each semi-final progress to the final. The European Broadcasting Union (EBU) split up the competing countries into six different pots based on voting patterns from previous contests, with countries with favourable voting histories put into the same pot. On 17 January 2011, a special allocation draw was held which placed each country into one of the two semi-finals, as well as which half of the show they would perform in. The Netherlands was placed into the second semi-final, to be held on 12 May 2011, and was scheduled to perform in the first half of the show. The running order for the semi-finals was decided through another draw on 15 March 2011 and the Netherlands was set to perform in position 3, following the entry from Austria and before the entry from Belgium.

The two semi-finals and the final was broadcast in the Netherlands on Nederland 1 with commentary by Jan Smit and Daniël Dekker. The Dutch spokesperson, who announced the Dutch votes during the final, was Mandy Huydts.

=== Semi-final ===
3JS took part in technical rehearsals on 2 and 6 May, followed by dress rehearsals on 9 and 10 May. This included the jury show on 9 May where the professional juries of each country watched and voted on the competing entries. The Dutch performance featured the members of 3JS wearing white and dark suits and performing together with three backing vocalists. The stage colours transitioned from purple and yellow to yellow and orange with spotlights, flashing lights and light rigs being used as well during the performance. The three backing vocalists that joined 3JS were: Brian Zalmijn, Lesley van der Aa and Michèle van der Aa.

At the end of the show, the Netherlands was not announced among the top 10 entries in the second semi-final and therefore failed to qualify to compete in the final. It was later revealed that the Netherlands placed nineteenth (last) in the semi-final, receiving a total of 13 points.

=== Voting ===
Voting during the three shows consisted of 50 percent public televoting and 50 percent from a jury deliberation. The jury consisted of five music industry professionals who were citizens of the country they represent. This jury was asked to judge each contestant based on: vocal capacity; the stage performance; the song's composition and originality; and the overall impression by the act. In addition, no member of a national jury could be related in any way to any of the competing acts in such a way that they cannot vote impartially and independently.

Following the release of the full split voting by the EBU after the conclusion of the competition, it was revealed that the Netherlands had placed nineteenth (last) with the public televote and eighteenth with the jury vote in the second semi-final. In the public vote, the Netherlands scored 17 points, while with the jury vote, the Netherlands scored 22 points.

Below is a breakdown of points awarded to the Netherlands and awarded by the Netherlands in the second semi-final and grand final of the contest. The nation awarded its 12 points to Sweden in the semi-final and to Denmark in the final of the contest.

==== Points awarded to the Netherlands ====
Points awarded to the Netherlands (Semi-final 2)
Score	Country
12 points	
10 points	
8 points	Belgium
7 points	
6 points	
5 points	Bulgaria
4 points	
3 points	
2 points	
1 point	

==== Points awarded by the Netherlands ====
Points awarded by the Netherlands (Semi-final 2)
Score	Country
12 points	Sweden
10 points	Bosnia and Herzegovina
8 points	Slovenia
7 points	Denmark
6 points	Belgium
5 points	Israel
4 points	Romania
3 points	Austria
2 points	Bulgaria
1 point	Ireland

Points awarded by the Netherlands (Final)
Score	Country
12 points	Denmark
10 points	Sweden
8 points	Bosnia and Herzegovina
7 points	Germany
6 points	Azerbaijan
5 points	Ireland
4 points	Romania
3 points	Serbia
2 points	Slovenia
1 point	Austria
