= E de fel på mig? =

2011 Linda Bengtzing song

Single by Linda Bengtzing

from the album Min karusell
- Released: 2011
- Genre: schlager
- Songwriters: Pontus Assarsson, Thomas G:son, Jörgen Ringqvist, Daniel Barkman

Linda Bengtzing singles chronology
"Victorious" (2010)	"E de fel på mig?" (2011)	"Ta mig" (2014)

"E de fel på mig?" is a song written by Pontus Assarsson, Thomas G:son, Jörgen Ringqvist and Daniel Barkman. Performed by Linda Bengtzing in the fourth semifinal of Melodifestivalen 2011 in Malmö, it received the highest number of votes, making it to the finals inside the Stockholm Globe Arena, where it ended up seventh.

The song charted at Svensktoppen for one week on 10 April 2011, where it entered at number nine, before leaving chart the next week. It also charted on the Swedish Singles Chart at number 15.

== Charts ==
Chart (2011)	Peak position
Sweden (Sverigetopplistan)	15
