= Bosnia and Herzegovina in the Eurovision Song Contest 2011 =

- Eurovision Song Contest 2011
- Country: Bosnia and Herzegovina
- Selection process: Internal selection
- Announcement date: Artist: 1 December 2010; Song: 21 February 2011

Competing entry
- Song: "Love in Rewind"
- Artist: Dino Merlin
- Songwriters: Dino Merlin

Placement
- Semi-final result: Qualified (5th, 109 points)
- Final result: 6th, 125 points

Participation chronology

Bosnia and Herzegovina was represented at the Eurovision Song Contest 2011 with the song "Love in Rewind" written and performed by Dino Merlin, who had represented Bosnia and Herzegovina in the Eurovision Song Contest 1999. On 1 December 2010, the Bosnian broadcaster Radio and Television of Bosnia and Herzegovina (BHRT) revealed that they had internally selected Dino Merlin to compete at the 2011 contest in Düsseldorf, Germany. His song, "Love in Rewind", was presented to the public during a show entitled BH Eurosong Show 2011 on 21 February 2011.

Bosnia and Herzegovina was drawn to compete in the second semi-final of the Eurovision Song Contest which took place on 12 May 2011. Performing as the opening entry for the show in position 1, "Love in Rewind" was announced among the top 10 entries of the second semi-final and therefore qualified to compete in the final on 14 May. It was later revealed that Bosnia and Herzegovina placed fifth out of the 19 participating countries in the semi-final with 109 points. In the final, Bosnia and Herzegovina performed in position 2 and placed sixth out of the 25 participating countries, scoring 125 points.

== Background ==
Prior to the 2011 contest, Bosnia and Herzegovina had participated in the Eurovision Song Contest sixteen times since its first entry in 1993. The nation's best placing in the contest was third, which it achieved in 2006 with the song "Lejla" performed by Hari Mata Hari. Following the introduction of semi-finals for the 2004 contest, Bosnia and Herzegovina has, up to this year, managed to qualify on each occasion the nation has participated and compete in the final. Bosnia and Herzegovina's least successful result has been 22nd place, which they have achieved in 1996.

The Bosnian national broadcaster, Radio and Television of Bosnia and Herzegovina (BHRT), broadcasts the event within Bosnia and Herzegovina and organises the selection process for the nation's entry. BHRT confirmed their intentions to participate at the 2011 Eurovision Song Contest on 19 November 2010. The broadcaster had selected the Bosnian entry through an internal selection process since 2006, a selection procedure that was continued for their 2011 entry.

== Before Eurovision ==
=== Internal selection ===
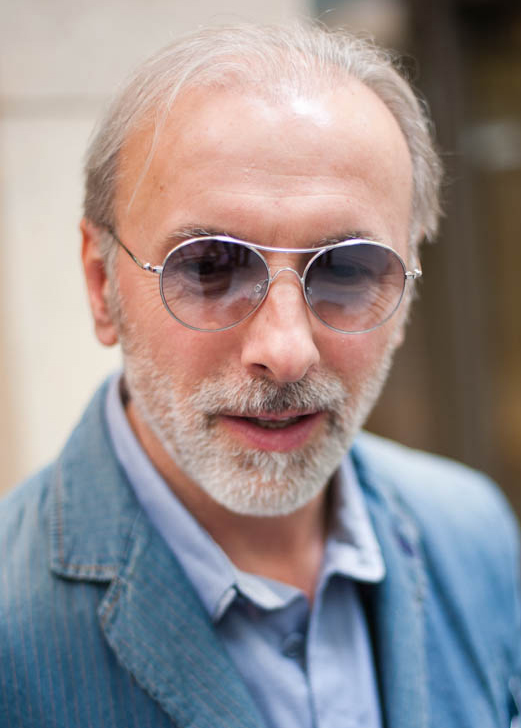
Dino Merlin was internally selected to represent Bosnia and Herzegovina in the Eurovision Song Contest 2011.

On 18 September 2010, the broadcaster opened the suggestions for the public to submit possible artists or ideas via their Facebook page. On 1 December 2010, BHRT announced that they had internally selected Dino Merlin to represent Bosnia and Herzegovina in Düsseldorf. Dino Merlin previously represented Bosnia and Herzegovina in the Eurovision Song Contest 1999 together with Béatrice Poulot, placing seventh with the song "Putnici". The song to be performed at the contest was also selected internally and was written by Merlin himself.

The song, "Love in Rewind", was presented during a television special entitled BH Eurosong Show 2011 on 21 February 2011, which was held at the BHRT Studio A in Sarajevo and hosted by Maja Čengić. The show was broadcast on BHT 1 and BH Radio 1 as well as streamed online via the broadcaster's website bhrt.ba and the official Eurovision Song Contest website eurovision.tv. In addition to the presentation of the song, the show featured guest performances by Béatrice Poulot, 1997 Italian Eurovision entrant Jalisse, 2010 Bosnian Eurovision entrant Vukašin Brajić and Turkish singer Mustafa Sandal. A Bosnian language version and English language version of the song were prepared, with the song being performed in English at the Eurovision Song Contest.

=== Promotion ===
Dino Merlin made several appearances across Europe to specifically promote "Love in Rewind" as the Bosnian Eurovision entry. On 26 February, Dino Merlin performed "Love in Rewind" during the semi-final of the Croatian Eurovision national final Dora 2011 - Let's go to Eurovision!. On 9 April, Dino Merlin performed during the special concert Düsseldorf, venim! which was held at the Liceul Teoretic "Nichita Stănescu" in Bucharest, Romania. Dino Merlin also took part in promotional activities in Bulgaria, Denmark, Macedonia, Slovenia and Sweden which included several television and concert appearances.

== At Eurovision ==
All countries except the "Big Five" (France, Germany, Italy, Spain and the United Kingdom), and the host country, are required to qualify from one of two semi-finals in order to compete for the final; the top ten countries from each semi-final progress to the final. The European Broadcasting Union (EBU) split up the competing countries into six different pots based on voting patterns from previous contests, with countries with favourable voting histories put into the same pot. On 17 January 2011, a special allocation draw was held which placed each country into one of the two semi-finals, as well as which half of the show they would perform in. Bosnia and Herzegovina was placed into the second semi-final, to be held on 12 May 2011, and was scheduled to perform in the first half of the show. The running order for the semi-finals was decided through another draw on 15 March 2011 and Bosnia and Herzegovina was set to open the show and perform in position 1, before the entry from Austria.

The two semi-finals and the final were broadcast in Bosnia and Herzegovina on BHT 1 with commentary by Dejan Kukrić. Additionally, a public screening of both the second semi-final and the final was organized at the Children of Sarajevo Square in Sarajevo. The Bosnian spokesperson, who announced the Bosnian votes during the final, was Ivana Vidmar.

=== Semi-final ===
Dino Merlin took part in technical rehearsals on 3 and 6 May, followed by dress rehearsals on 9 and 10 May. This included the jury show on 9 May where the professional juries of each country watched and voted on the competing entries.

The Bosnian performance featured Dino Merlin in a checked jacket and brown trousers, joined on stage by five backing vocalists who each played an instrument: contrabass, keyboard, banjo, tambourine and trumpet. The stage lighting displayed predominantly red colours with the LED screens displaying pictures red curtain effects which transitioned to pictures of a fairground theme with hobby horses overlaid with heart shapes that were turned on their side to show a rewind symbol on modern gadgets. The five backing vocalists that joined Dino Merlin were: Aida Mušanović, Edvin Hadžić, Mahir Sulejmanović, Maya Sar and Nermin Puškar. Maya Sar would go on to represent Bosnia and Herzegovina in the Eurovision Song Contest 2012.

At the end of the show, Bosnia and Herzegovina was announced as having finished in the top 10 and subsequently qualifying for the grand final. It was later revealed that Bosnia and Herzegovina placed fifth in the semi-final, receiving a total of 109 points.

=== Final ===
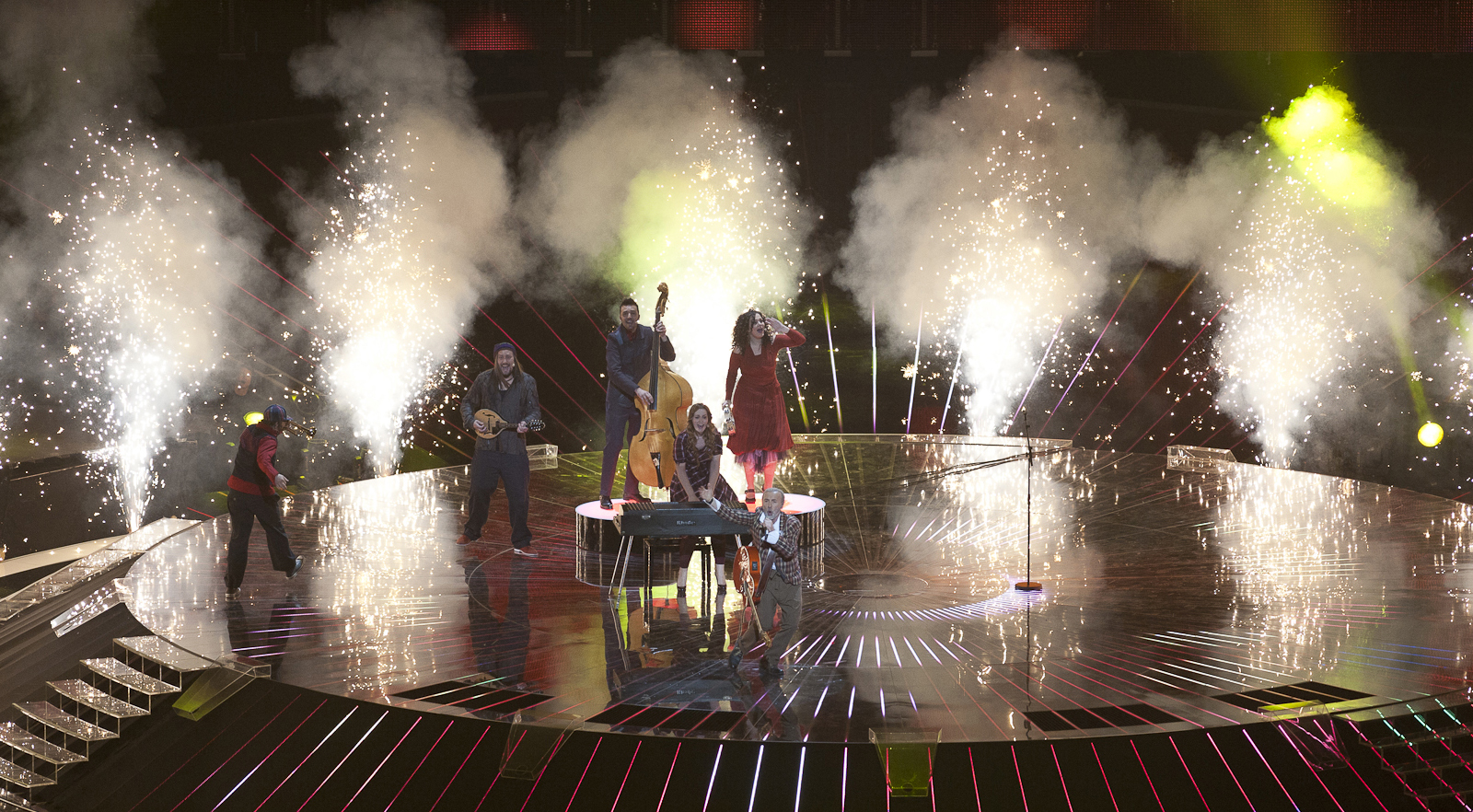
Dino Merlin performing "Love in Rewind" at the Eurovision Song Contest final on 14 May.

Shortly after the second semi-final, a winners' press conference was held for the ten qualifying countries. As part of this press conference, the qualifying artists took part in a draw to determine the running order for the final. This draw was done in the order the countries were announced during the semi-final. Bosnia and Herzegovina was drawn to perform in position 2, following the entry from Finland and before the entry from Denmark.

Dino Merlin once again took part in dress rehearsals on 13 and 14 May before the final, including the jury final where the professional juries cast their final votes before the live show. Dino Merlin performed a repeat of his semi-final performance during the final on 14 May. At the conclusion of the voting, Bosnia and Herzegovina finished in sixth place with 125 points.

=== Voting ===
Voting during the three shows involved each country awarding points from 1-8, 10 and 12 as determined by a combination of 50% national jury and 50% televoting. Each nation's jury consisted of five music industry professionals who are citizens of the country they represent. This jury judged each entry based on: vocal capacity; the stage performance; the song's composition and originality; and the overall impression by the act. In addition, no member of a national jury was permitted to be related in any way to any of the competing acts in such a way that they cannot vote impartially and independently.

Following the release of the full split voting by the EBU after the conclusion of the competition, it was revealed that Bosnia and Herzegovina had placed sixth with the public televote and eleventh with the jury vote in the final. In the public vote, Bosnia and Herzegovina scored 151 points, while with the jury vote, Bosnia and Herzegovina scored 90 points. In the second semi-final, Bosnia and Herzegovina placed second with the public televote with 131 points and eleventh with the jury vote, scoring 65 points.

Below is a breakdown of points awarded to Bosnia and Herzegovina and awarded by Bosnia and Herzegovina in the second semi-final and grand final of the contest. The nation awarded its 12 points to Slovenia in the semi-final and the final of the contest.

==== Points awarded to Bosnia and Herzegovina ====
Points awarded to Bosnia and Herzegovina (Semi-final 2)
Score	Country
12 points	Austria; Macedonia; Slovakia; Slovenia
10 points	France; Netherlands
8 points	Sweden
7 points	Denmark; Germany
6 points	
5 points	Belarus
4 points	Belgium; Italy; Ukraine
3 points	
2 points	Latvia
1 point	

Points awarded to Bosnia and Herzegovina (Final)
Score	Country
12 points	Austria; Macedonia; Serbia; Slovenia; Switzerland
10 points	Turkey
8 points	Netherlands; Sweden
7 points	Albania; Croatia; Germany
6 points	
5 points	France
4 points	Italy; Norway
3 points	Greece
2 points	Bulgaria
1 point	

==== Points awarded by Bosnia and Herzegovina ====
Points awarded by Bosnia and Herzegovina (Semi-final 2)
Score	Country
12 points	Slovenia
10 points	Macedonia
8 points	Belgium
7 points	Austria
6 points	Slovakia
5 points	Sweden
4 points	Ukraine
3 points	Ireland
2 points	Belarus
1 point	Denmark

Points awarded by Bosnia and Herzegovina (Final)
Score	Country
12 points	Slovenia
10 points	Serbia
8 points	Azerbaijan
7 points	Austria
6 points	Italy
5 points	Sweden
4 points	France
3 points	Germany
2 points	Ireland
1 point	Iceland
