= Alkbottle =

Austrian metal band

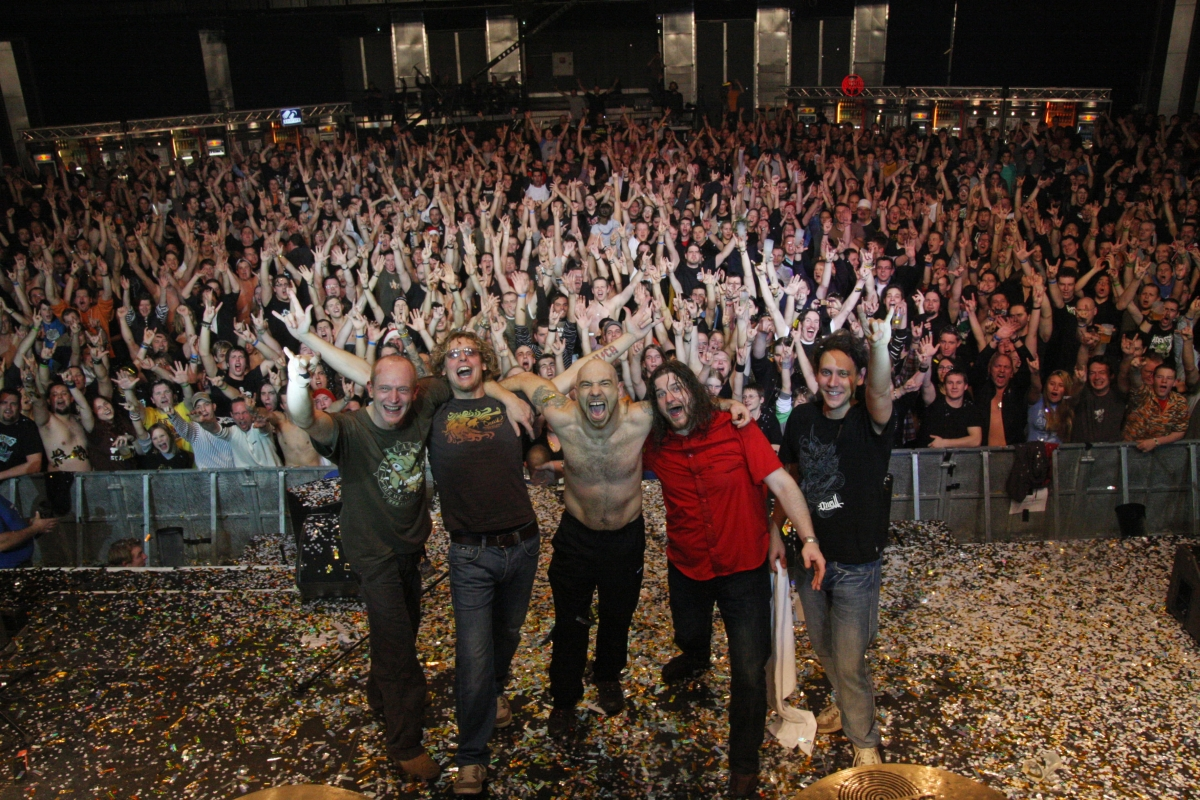
- Alkbottle live at Gasometer Vienna 2009.

Background information
- Origin: Meidling, Vienna, Austria
- Genres: Heavy Metal, Hard rock,
- Years active: 1990–1998, 2002–2003, 2006–present
- Labels: ATS Records,
- Members: Roman Gregory; Chris Zitta; Marco Billiani; Didi Baumgartner; Christoph "Mad" Ullmann
- Past members: Christian Breier; Wilfried Keck; Alex "Mungo" Brunner; Michi Klapper; Peter Wagner; Robert "Bertl" Baumgartner; Ernst Luttinger

Alkbottle is an Austrian rock, metal and Punk rock band from Vienna, Austria. They have been notable in Austria since 1993.

They have had gold records, founded their own label, have their own beer, supported bands like Kiss, Deep Purple, ZZ Top and many more until they decided to go separate ways in 1998. After a long break the band returned in 2006 and released their album "Hier regiert der Rock 'n' Roll in 2008".

== Albums ==
- No Sleep Till Meidling (1993)
- Blader, fetter, lauter & a bissl mehr (1994)
- Wir san auf kana Kinderjausn (1995)
- Trivialkbottle (1997)
- Hier regiert der Rock n' Roll (2008)
- Für immer (2012)

=== Live ===
- Live statt nüchtern (1996)
- Live im Zelt 94 (2 CD) (2004)

=== Compilations ===
- The Last of (2 CD) (1999)
- S'Ollagrösste & a bissl mehr (2011)
- Lager Export (2014)

=== Singles ===
- Geh scheissn! (1995)
- Fliesenlegen (1995)
- Wir trinken auf Rapid (1997)
- 6 Bier (2004)
- Wir san do ned zum Spass (2011)

=== DVD ===
- 5 nach XII - Lights Out Over Meidling (2002)
- 20 Joa in Ö & Fett wia Christkindl (2 CD/2 DVD) (2010)
