= Oh My God! (The Moniker song) =

Single by The Moniker
- Released: 2011
- Genre: Pop
- Songwriter(s): The Moniker

The Moniker singles chronology
"Oh My God!" (2011)	"I Want to Be Chris Isaak" (2012)

"Oh My God!" is a song written by The Moniker which he performed at Melodifestivalen 2011. The song made it through Andra chansen to the final inside the Stockholm Globe Arena where it finished in third place.

The song entered Svensktoppen on 17 April 2011.

An alternate version with lyrics in Swedish, "Göteborgslåten", is about the city of Gothenburg.

== Charts ==
Chart (2011)	Peak position
Sweden (Sverigetopplistan)	4
