= Joker (Anna Rossinelli song) =

Single by Anna Rossinelli

from the album Bon Voyage
- Released: 14 October 2011
- Recorded: 2011
- Genre: Pop
- Length: 3:38
- Label: Universal Music
- Songwriter(s): Phillipa Alexander, Ellie Wyatt, Alex Ball, Vicky Nolan
- Producer(s): Fred Herrmann

Anna Rossinelli singles chronology
"In Love for a While" (2011)	"Joker" (2011)	"See What You've Done" (2012)

"Joker" is a song performed by Swiss singer Anna Rossinelli from her debut studio album Bon Voyage. The single was released on 14 October 2011 as a digital download in Switzerland. The song was written by Phillipa Alexander, Ellie Wyatt, Alex Ball, Vicky Nolan and produced by Fred Herrmann. It's a cover of "The Joker" by Kato, a Belgian artist, it was her first single after her participation at Idols 2011. The single was released in June 2011

== Track listing ==
Digital download
No.	Title	Length
1.	"Joker"	3:38

== Credits and personnel ==
- Lead vocals – Anna Rossinelli
- Producer – Fred Herrmann
- Lyrics – Phillipa Alexander, Ellie Wyatt, Alex Ball, Vicky Nolan
- Label: Universal Music

== Release history ==
Region	Date	Format	Label
Switzerland	14 October 2011	Digital download	Universal Music
