= List of awards and nominations received by Aurela Gaçe =

The List of awards and nominations received by refers to the awards and nominations which were received by Albanian singer and songwriter Aurela Gaçe.

== Awards and nominations ==
Balkan Music Awards

Year	Nominee / work	Award	Result
2011	"Origjinale"	Best Song from Albania	Won
2011	"Origjinale"	Best Song from Balkans	Won

Festivali i Këngës

Year	Nominee / work	Award	Result
1997	"E kemi fatin shpresë dhe marrëzi"	First Place	Runner-up
1999	"S´jam tribu"	First Prize	Won
1999	"S´jam tribu"	Best Performer	Won
2001	"Jetoj"	First Prize	Won
2010	"Kënga Ime"	First Prize	Won

Kënga Magjike

Year	Nominee / work	Award	Result
2007	"Hape Vetën"	First Prize	Won
2007	"Hape Vetën"	Best Performer	Won
2014	"Pa Kontroll" (feat.Young Zerka)	First Prize	Won
2014	"Pa Kontroll" (feat.Young Zerka)	Hit Song	Won
2015	"Akoma Jo"	First Prize	Won
2015	"Akoma Jo"	Best Performer	Won

Kult Awards

Year	Nominee / work	Award	Result
2016	"Akoma Jo"	Best Song of the Year	Won

Euro Fest

Year	Nominee / work	Award	Result
1998	"Addicted To Love"	Best Performer	Won

Netet e Klipt Shqipetar

Year	Nominee / work	Award	Result
2012	"Tranzit"	First Prize/Best Video	Won
2013	"Shpirt i Shpirtit Tim"	Best Camera	Won
2013	"Shpirt i Shpirtit Tim"	Best Performer	Won

Videofest Awards

Year	Nominee / work	Award	Result
2011	Origjinale	Internet Prize	Won

Zhurma Show Awards

Year	Nominee / work	Award	Result
2010	"Origjinale"	Best Song	Won
