= Croatia in the Eurovision Song Contest 2011 =

- Eurovision Song Contest 2011
- Country: Croatia
- Selection process: Dora 2011
- Selection date: 5 March 2011

Competing entry
- Song: "Celebrate"
- Artist: Daria
- Songwriters: Boris Đurđević; Marina Mudrinić

Placement
- Semi-final result: Failed to qualify (15th)

Participation chronology

Croatia was represented at the Eurovision Song Contest 2011 with the song "Celebrate" written by Boris Đurđević and Marina Mudrinić. The song was performed by Daria. The Croatian broadcaster Croatian Radiotelevision (HRT) organised the national final Dora 2011 to select the Croatian entry for the 2011 contest in Düsseldorf, Germany. Twenty-four artists competed in the national final which consisted of seven shows: four heats, a quarter-final, a semi-final and a final. Contestants were selected to advance in the competition based on the votes of a public televote. Two contestants qualified to compete in the final on 5 March 2011 where the winner was selected over two rounds of voting. In the first round, each finalist performed the three candidate Eurovision songs and one song per finalist advanced to the superfinal following the combination of votes from a three-member judging panel and a public televote. In the superfinal, "Lahor" performed by Daria was selected as the winner based entirely on a public televote. The song was later translated from Croatian to English for the Eurovision Song Contest and was titled "Celebrate".

Croatia was drawn to compete in the first semi-final of the Eurovision Song Contest which took place on 10 May 2011. Performing during the show in position 13, "Celebrate" was not announced among the top 10 entries of the first semi-final and therefore did not qualify to compete in the final. It was later revealed that Croatia placed fifteenth out of the 19 participating countries in the semi-final with 41 points.

== Background ==
Prior to the 2011 contest, Croatia had participated in the Eurovision Song Contest eighteen times since its first entry in 1993. The nation's best result in the contest was fourth, which it achieved on two occasions: in 1996 with the song "Sveta ljubav" performed by Maja Blagdan and in 1999 with the song "Marija Magdalena" performed by Doris Dragović. Following the introduction of semi-finals for the 2004, Croatia had thus far featured in five finals. In 2010, Croatia failed to qualify to the final with Feminnem and the song "Lako je sve".

The Croatian national broadcaster, Croatian Radiotelevision (HRT), broadcasts the event within Croatia and organises the selection process for the nation's entry. HRT confirmed Croatia's participation in the 2011 Eurovision Song Contest on 23 October 2010. Since 1993, HRT organised the national final Dora in order to select the Croatian entry for the Eurovision Song Contest, a method that was continued for their 2011 participation.

== Before Eurovision ==
=== Dora 2011 ===
The logo of Dora 2011

Dora 2011 was the nineteenth edition of the Croatian national selection Dora which selected Croatia's entry for the Eurovision Song Contest 2011. Under the slogan Idemo na Eurosong! (Let's go to Eurovision!), the competition consisted of seven shows between 22 January and 5 March 2011 all taking place at the Studio 10 of HRT in Zagreb, hosted by Aleksandar Kostadinov, Leona Paraminski and Monika Lelas and broadcast on HRT 1 as well as online via the broadcaster's official website hrt.hr. The final was also streamed online via the official Eurovision Song Contest website eurovision.tv.

==== Format ====
Dora 2011 consisted of seven shows: four heats, a quarter-final, a semi-final and a final. In each of the first two heats on 22 and 29 January 2011, twelve contestants performed a song of their choice and seven were eliminated from the competition. An additional seven contestants were eliminated in the third heat on 5 February 2011, while three were eliminated in the fourth heat on 12 February 2011 and the top three proceeded to the quarter-final. Two contestants were eliminated in the quarter-final on 19 February 2011, while one was eliminated in the semi-final on 26 February 2011. The results of the first six shows were determined by public televoting, while in the first five shows, one contestant was saved by a weekly public vote among those eliminated to remain in the competition as a wildcard. The remaining two contestants proceeded to the final on 5 March 2011 where they performed their versions of the three songs bidding for Eurovision and the Croatian entry was selected by votes from the public and a judging panel. Ties in the final were decided in favour of the entry that was awarded the most points from the jury. Public voting included options for telephone and SMS voting.

==== Competing entries ====
Singers being citizens of the Republic of Croatia were able to attend auditions between 9 December 2010 and 11 December 2010. A six-member expert committee consisting of Željen Klašterka (HRT), Branka Muvrin (HRT), Hrid Matić (HRT), Željimir Babogredac (HDU), Zvonimir Bučević (HDU) and Hrvoje Hegedušić (HDS) reviewed the 150 applicants and selected twenty-four contestants for the competition. HRT announced the contestants on 21 December 2010, while the three candidate Eurovision songs to be performed by the finalists of the competition, written by composers invited by HRT: Ante Pecotić, Boris Đurđević and Lea Dekleva, were announced on 28 February 2011.

Competing songs
Song	Songwriter(s)
"Još ima nas"	Lea Dekleva
"Lahor"	Boris Đurđević, Andrea Čubrić
"Stotinama godina"	Ante Pecotić, Predrag Martinjak

==== Results summary ====
Colour key
– Contestant received the most public votes
– Contestant received the fewest public votes and was eliminated
– Contestant received the public wildcard

Contestant	Show 1	Show 2	Show 3	Show 4	Show 5 (Quarter-final)	Show 6 (Semi-final)	Show 7 (Final)
Daria Kinzer	—N/a	Safe	Safe	Safe	3rd	1st	1st
Jacques Houdek	Safe	—N/a	Safe	Safe	2nd	2nd	2nd
Mirko Švenda	—N/a	Safe	Safe	Safe	1st	3rd	Eliminated (Show 6)
Katica Marinović	—N/a	Safe	Safe	Safe	4th	Eliminated (Show 5)	
Ana Eškinja	—N/a	Safe	Safe	5th-6th	Eliminated (Show 4)		
Doris Teur	—N/a	Safe	Safe	5th-6th	Eliminated (Show 4)		
Dora Benc	Safe	—N/a	7th-12th	Eliminated (Show 3)			
Sabrina Hebiri	Safe	—N/a	7th-12th	Eliminated (Show 3)			
Saša Lozar	—N/a	Safe	7th-12th	Eliminated (Show 3)			
Miro Tomić	Safe	—N/a	7th-12th	Eliminated (Show 3)			
Jelena Vanjek	Safe	—N/a	7th-12th	Eliminated (Show 3)			
Tina Vukov	Safe	—N/a	7th-12th	Eliminated (Show 3)			
Diana Heraković	—N/a	7th-12th	Eliminated (Show 2)				
Filip Dizdar	—N/a	7th-12th	Eliminated (Show 2)				
Manuela Svorcan	—N/a	7th-12th	Eliminated (Show 2)				
Marija Rubčić	—N/a	7th-12th	Eliminated (Show 2)				
Mijo Lešina	—N/a	7th-12th	Eliminated (Show 2)				
Renata Holi	—N/a	7th-12th	Eliminated (Show 2)				
Artemija Stanić	7th-12th	Eliminated (Show 1)					
Damir Kedžo	7th-12th	Eliminated (Show 1)					
Ivana Brkašić	7th-12th	Eliminated (Show 1)					
Mario Sambrailo	7th-12th	Eliminated (Show 1)					
Mila Soldatić	7th-12th	Eliminated (Show 1)					
Valentina Briški	7th-12th	Eliminated (Show 1)					

==== Heats ====
The four heats took place on 22 January, 29 January, 5 February and 12 February 2011. Following the first heat, HRT announced during a press conference that the votes were incorrectly analysed and that Jelena Vanjek had qualified instead of Damir Kedžo. Three guest judges also participated in each heat, which were Gabi Novak, Dino Jelusić and Milana Vlaović for the first heat, Vanna, Luka Nižetić and Sandra Bagarić for the second heat, Tereza Kesovija, Maja Blagdan and Hari Varešanović for the third heat, and Ivana Banfić, Mirjana Bohanec and Tomislav Bralić for the fourth heat.

Heat 1 – 22 January 2011
R/O	Artist	Song (Original artists)	Place	Result
1	Damir Kedžo	"Crazy Little Thing Called Love" (Queen)		—N/a
2	Ivana Brkašić	"Iznad oblaka" (Nola)		—N/a
3	Artemija Stanić	"Believe" (Cher)		—N/a
4	Miro Tomić	"Sjećam se provog poljupca" (Film)		Safe
5	Mila Soldatić	"Wuthering Heights" (Kate Bush)		—N/a
6	Tina Vukov	"S vremena na vrijeme" (Prljavo kazalište)		Wildcard
7	Mario Sambrailo	"Sway" (Michael Bublé)		—N/a
8	Sabrina Hebiri	"Tempera" (Gibonni)		Safe
9	Dora Benc	"This Is the Life" (Amy Macdonald)		Safe
10	Jelena Vanjek	"Gdje Dunav ljubi nebo" (Josipa Lisac)		Safe
11	Valentina Briški	"Monday Morning" (Melanie Fiona)		—N/a
12	Jacques Houdek	"Molitva" (Parni Valjak)	1	Safe

Heat 2 – 29 January 2011
R/O	Artist	Song (Original artists)	Televote	Place	Result
1	Renata Holi	"Ja za ljubav neću moliti" (Nina Badrić)			—N/a
2	Mijo Lešina	"Signed, Sealed, Delivered I'm Yours" (Stevie Wonder)			—N/a
3	Manuela Svorcan	"Da smo se voljeli manje" (Jinx)			—N/a
4	Daria Kinzer	"A New Day Has Come" (Celine Dion)			Wildcard
5	Doris Teur	"Stop" (Natali Dizdar)			Safe
6	Diana Heraković	"Respect" (Aretha Franklin)			—N/a
7	Mirko Švenda	"Da li znaš da te volim" (Time)	2,969	1	Safe
8	Katica Marinović	"I'm Outta Love" (Anastacia)			Safe
9	Ana Eškinja	"Kao da me nema tu" (Vanna)			Safe
10	Marija Rubčić	"If I Ain't Got You" (Alicia Keys)			—N/a
11	Filip Dizdar	"Nebo iznad nas" (Tony Cetinski)			—N/a
12	Saša Lozar	"Billie Jean" (Michael Jackson)			Safe

Heat 3 – 5 February 2011
R/O	Artist	Song (Original artists)	Televote	Place	Result
1	Mirko Švenda	"I'm Still Standing" (Elton John)	3,978	1	Safe
2	Doris Teur	"Tako lako" (Cacadou Look)			Wildcard
3	Saša Lozar	"Stars" (Simply Red)			—N/a
4	Dora Benc	"Mjesec" (DeTour)			—N/a
5	Sabrina Hebiri	"Mercy" (Duffy)			—N/a
6	Miro Tomić	"Nitko kao ti" (Songkillers)			—N/a
7	Jacques Houdek	"Right Here Waiting" (Richard Marx)			Safe
8	Katica Marinović	"Vatra i led" (Colonia)			Safe
9	Tina Vukov	"Cry Cry" (Oceana)			—N/a
10	Jelena Vanjek	"Valerie" (Amy Winehouse)			—N/a
11	Ana Eškinja	"Alejandro" (Lady Gaga)			Safe
12	Daria Kinzer	"Ugasi me" (Parni Valjak)			Safe

Heat 4 – 12 February 2011
R/O	Artist	Song (Original artists)	Place	Result
1	Katica Marinović	"Tvoja ljubav" (The Bastardz)		Wildcard
2	Jacques Houdek	"Oprosti" (Gibonni)		Safe
3	Ana Eškinja	"Čarobno jutro" (Nina Badrić)		—N/a
4	Mirko Švenda	"U ljubav vjere nemam" (Oliver Dragojević)	1	Safe
5	Daria Kinzer	"Da ti nisam bila dovoljna" (Electro Team)		Safe
6	Doris Teur	"Danas sam luda" (Josipa Lisac)		—N/a

==== Quarter-final ====
The quarter-final took place on 19 February 2011. The three guest judges that participated in the quarter-final were Danijela Martinović, Miran Veljković and Ivanka Boljkovac. In addition to the performances of the contestants, Danijela Martinović and 2006 Croatian Eurovision entrant Severina performed as the interval acts during the show.

Quarter-final – 19 February 2011
R/O	Artist	Song (Original artists)	R/O	Song (Original artists)	Televote	Place	Result
1	Katica Marinović	"Idem tamo gdje je sve po mom" (Jinx)	5	"I'm So Excited" (The Pointer Sisters)			—N/a
2	Daria Kinzer	"If I Could Turn Back Time" (Cher)	6	"Kao rijeka" (Vanna)			Wildcard
3	Mirko Švenda	"Svi tvoji poljupci" (Boa)	7	"Help!" (Beatles)	6,707	1	Safe
4	Jacques Houdek	"Kiss" (Prince)	8	"Nek' ti bude ljubav sva" (Tony Cetinski)	6,504	2	Safe

==== Semi-final ====
The semi-final took place on 26 February 2011. The three guest judges that participated in the semi-final were Josipa Lisac, Emilija Kokić and Branko Bubica. In addition to the performances of the contestants, the show was opened by Doris Karamatić and 1983 Yugoslav Eurovision entrant Danijel Popović, while 1999 and 2011 Bosnian Eurovision entrant Dino Merlin as well as Emilija Kokić performed as the interval acts.

Semi-final – 26 February 2011
R/O	Artist	Song (Original artists)	R/O	Song (Original artists)	Televote	Place	Result
1	Daria Kinzer	"Žena za sva vremena" (Zorica Brunclik)	4	"The Best" (Tina Turner)	11,844	1	Safe
2	Jacques Houdek	"Dvije duše" (Gibonni)	5	"You Raise Me Up" (Secret Garden)	8,937	2	Safe
3	Mirko Švenda	"You Raise Me Up" (Secret Garden)	6	"Bitanga i princeza" (Bijelo Dugme)		3	—N/a

===== Final =====
The final took place on 5 March 2011. The winner was selected over two rounds of voting. In the first round, the two finalists Daria Kinzer and Jacques Houdek each performed their versions of the three candidate Eurovision songs and a 50/50 combination of votes from a three-member judging panel and a public televote selected one song per finalist to proceed to the second round, the superfinal. "Lahor" and "Stotinama godina" performed by both Kinzer and Houdek were tied at 5 points each but since "Lahor" received the most votes from the judges the song was selected to advance. The judges that participated in the final were Tonči Huljić, Severina and Andrej Babić. In the superfinal, the winner, "Lahor" performed by Daria Kinzer, was determined exclusively by a public televote. In addition to the performances of the contestants, Petar Grašo with Madre Badessa and Goran Bregović, 2005 Croatian Eurovision entrant Boris Novković, and 2005 Bosnian and 2010 Croatian Eurovision entrant Feminnem performed as the interval acts during the show.

Final – 5 March 2011
R/O	Artist	Song	Jury	Televote		Total	Result
R/O	Artist	Song	Jury	Votes	Points	Total	Result
1	Jacques Houdek	"Još ima nas"	1	530	1	2	—N/a
2	Daria Kinzer	"Još ima nas"	1	725	1	2	—N/a
3	Jacques Houdek	"Lahor"	3	1,853	2	5	Advanced
4	Daria Kinzer	"Lahor"	3	2,293	2	5	Advanced
5	Jacques Houdek	"Stotinama godina"	2	3,920	3	5	—N/a
6	Daria Kinzer	"Stotinama godina"	2	5,915	3	5	—N/a

Detailed Jury Votes
R/O	Artist	Song	T. Huljić	Severina	A. Babić	Total	Points
1	Jacques Houdek	"Još ima nas"	5	6	5	16	1
2	Daria Kinzer	"Još ima nas"	5	7	5	17	1
3	Jacques Houdek	"Lahor"	9	10	10	29	3
4	Daria Kinzer	"Lahor"	10	9	10	29	3
5	Jacques Houdek	"Stotinama godina"	9	9	9	27	2
6	Daria Kinzer	"Stotinama godina"	7	8	8	23	2

Superfinal – 5 March 2011
R/O	Artist	Song	Televote	Place
1	Jacques Houdek	"Lahor"	5,090	2
2	Daria Kinzer	"Lahor"	9,000	1

=== Preparation ===
An English version of "Lahor" entitled "Break a Leg" was also performed by Daria at the final of Dora 2011 following her victory. On 6 March, composer Boris Đurđević revealed that the English lyrics of the song would undergo changes for the Eurovision Song Contest. The new version, "Celebrate", premiered on 11 March during the radio programme Sunčani sat broadcast on HR 2 and hosted by Zlatko Turkalj Turki. In early March, Daria filmed the music video for "Celebrate", which was directed by Zoran Pezo and the company Blue Film. The music video was presented on 14 March during the HRT news programme Dnevnik. French, German and Russian versions of the song were also recorded entitled "C'est la fête", "Diese Nacht" and "Lunnij svjet", respectively.

=== Promotion ===
Daria made several appearances across Europe to specifically promote "Celebrate" as the Croatian Eurovision entry. On 18 March, Daria performed during the BHT 1 show Konačno petak in Bosnia and Herzegovina. On 15 and 16 April, Daria took part in promotional activities in Malta where she appeared during several programmes on TVM including the talk show Xarabank. On 18 April, Daria performed during the show Bingo i pesma and the morning programme on Radio Television of Serbia (RTS) in Serbia. Daria concluded promotional activities in Slovenia where she appeared in and performed during the TV SLO1 programme Spet doma in Slovenia on 22 April.

== At Eurovision ==
According to Eurovision rules, all nations with the exceptions of the host country and the "Big Five" (France, Germany, Italy, Spain and the United Kingdom) are required to qualify from one of two semi-finals in order to compete for the final; the top ten countries from each semi-final progress to the final. The European Broadcasting Union (EBU) split up the competing countries into six different pots based on voting patterns from previous contests, with countries with favourable voting histories put into the same pot. On 17 January 2011, a special allocation draw was held which placed each country into one of the two semi-finals, as well as which half of the show they would perform in. Croatia was placed into the first semi-final, to be held on 10 May 2011, and was scheduled to perform in the second half of the show. The running order for the semi-finals was decided through another draw on 15 March 2011 and Croatia was set to perform in position 13, following the entry from San Marino and before the entry from Iceland.

The two semi-finals and the final were broadcast in Croatia on HRT 1 with commentary by Duško Ćurlić. The Croatian spokesperson, who announced the Croatian votes during the final, was Nevena Rendeli.

=== Semi-final ===
Daria took part in technical rehearsals on 2 and 5 May, followed by dress rehearsals on 9 and 10 May. This included the jury show on 9 May where the professional juries of each country watched and voted on the competing entries.

The Croatian performance featured Daria in a short black dress with a gold band in the middle, which changed colours twice to pink and silver. The stage lighting was predominantly blue with Daria performing choreography with a dancer at a DJ deck with silver and purple strands and making use of the stage catwalk. Daria was joined on stage by four backing vocalists: Ana Jakšić, Irena Križ, Jasenka Rutar and Katarina Jurić. The dancer was Russian illusionist Sergey Vorontsov, while the choreographer of the Croatian performance was Larisa Lipovac.

At the end of the show, Croatia was not announced among the top 10 entries in the second semi-final and therefore failed to qualify to compete in the final. It was later revealed that Croatia placed fifteenth in the semi-final, receiving a total of 41 points.

=== Voting ===
Voting during the three shows consisted of 50 percent public televoting and 50 percent from a jury deliberation. The jury consisted of five music industry professionals who were citizens of the country they represent, with their names published before the contest to ensure transparency. This jury was asked to judge each contestant based on: vocal capacity; the stage performance; the song's composition and originality; and the overall impression by the act. In addition, no member of a national jury could be related in any way to any of the competing acts in such a way that they cannot vote impartially and independently. The individual rankings of each jury member were released shortly after the grand final.

Following the release of the full split voting by the EBU after the conclusion of the competition, it was revealed that Croatia had placed sixteenth with the public televote and fourteenth with the jury vote in the first semi-final. In the public vote, Croatia scored 32 points, while with the jury vote, Croatia scored 49 points.

Below is a breakdown of points awarded to Croatia and awarded by Croatia in the first semi-final and grand final of the contest. The nation awarded its 12 points to Serbia in the semi-final and to Slovenia in the final of the contest.

==== Points awarded to Croatia ====
Points awarded to Croatia (Semi-final 1)
Score	Country
12 points	Malta; Serbia
10 points	
8 points	
7 points	Albania
6 points	
5 points	
4 points	Azerbaijan; San Marino
3 points	
2 points	
1 point	Iceland; Russia

==== Points awarded by Croatia ====
Points awarded by Croatia (Semi-final 1)
Score	Country
12 points	Serbia
10 points	Azerbaijan
8 points	Greece
7 points	Albania
6 points	Hungary
5 points	Russia
4 points	Malta
3 points	Finland
2 points	Switzerland
1 point	San Marino

Points awarded by Croatia (Final)
Score	Country
12 points	Slovenia
10 points	Azerbaijan
8 points	Serbia
7 points	Bosnia and Herzegovina
6 points	France
5 points	Ukraine
4 points	Sweden
3 points	Austria
2 points	Lithuania
1 point	Germany
