= Shine in the Light =

Single by Anna Rossinelli

from the album Marylou Two
- Released: February 2014
- Recorded: 2013
- Genre: Pop
- Length: 3:13
- Label: Universal Music Group
- Songwriters: Anna Rossinelli; Georg Schlunegger; Georg Dillier; Manuel Meisel
- Producer: Georg Schlunegger

Anna Rossinelli singles chronology
"Let It Go" (2013)	"Shine in the Light" (2014)

"Shine in the Light" is a single by Swiss singer-songwriter Anna Rossinelli. The song was released as the lead single from her re-released second studio album Marylou called Marylou Two (2014). The song has peaked to number 4 on the Swiss Singles Chart. The song was written by Anna Rossinelli, Georg Schlunegger, Georg Dillier, and Manuel Meisel. The Swiss television studio SRF used the single Shine in the Light as their official song for the broadcast of the 2014 Winter Olympics.

== Music video ==
A music video to accompany the release of "Shine in the Light" was first released onto YouTube on February 7, 2014, at a total length of three minutes and twenty-one seconds.

== Track listing ==
Digital download
No.	Title	Length
1.	"Shine in the Light"	3:13

== Charts ==
Chart (2014)	Peak position
Switzerland (Schweizer Hitparade)	4

== Release history ==
Region	Date	Format	Label
Switzerland	February 2014	Digital download	Universal Music Group
