= Albania in the Eurovision Song Contest 2011 =

- Eurovision Song Contest 2011
- Participating broadcaster: Radio Televizioni Shqiptar (RTSH)
- Country: Albania
- Selection process: Festivali i Këngës 49
- Selection date: 25 December 2010

Competing entry
- Song: "Feel the Passion"
- Artist: Aurela Gaçe
- Songwriters: Shpëtim Saraçi; Sokol Marsi

Placement
- Semi-final result: Failed to qualify (14th)

Participation chronology

Albania was represented at the Eurovision Song Contest 2011 with the song "Feel the Passion", written by Shpëtim Saraçi and Sokol Marsi, and performed by Aurela Gaçe. The Albanian participating broadcaster, Radio Televizioni Shqiptar (RTSH), selected its entry through the national selection competition Festivali i Këngës in December 2010. To this point, RTSH had participated in the Eurovision Song Contest seven times since its first entry in 2004. Prior to the contest, the song was promoted by a music video and live performances both in Belarus, Greece, Turkey and the Netherlands. Albania was drawn to compete in the first semi-final of the Eurovision Song Contest, which took place on 10 May 2011. Performing as number three, the nation was not announced among the top 10 entries of the semi-final and therefore failed to qualify for the grand final, marking Albania's third non-qualification in the contest.

== Background ==
Prior to the 2011 contest, Radio Televizioni Shqiptar (RTSH) had participated in the Eurovision Song Contest representing Albania seven times since its first entry in 2004. Its highest placing in the contest, to this point, had been seventh place, achieved in 2004 with the song "The Image of You" performed by Anjeza Shahini. During its tenure in the contest, Albania failed to qualify for the final two times, with the 2007 entry being the most recent non-qualifier.

As part of its duties as participating broadcaster, RTSH organises the selection of its entry in the Eurovision Song Contest and broadcasts the event in the country. RTSH has organised Festivali i Këngës since its inauguration in 1962. Since 2003, the winner of the competition has simultaneously won the right to represent Albania in the Eurovision Song Contest.

== Before Eurovision ==
=== Festivali i Këngës ===
RTSH organised the 49th edition of Festivali i Këngës to determine its entry for the Eurovision Song Contest 2011. The competition consisted of two semi-finals on 23 and 24 December, respectively, and the grand final on 25 December 2010. The three live shows were hosted by Albanian singer Jonida Maliqi, presenter Josif Gjinpali and actress Mirela Naska. The contest featured two categories, one dedicated to established artists and the other to newcomer artists. The two semi-finals each featured 16 competing entries performed by established artists and three competing entries performed by newcomers. The votes of a jury panel selected 11 entries from the established artists in each semi-final to advance to the final, while the votes of an alternate jury panel selected one entry from the newcomer artists in each semi-final to advance to the final. In the final, the 18 competing entries were voted upon by a jury panel in order to select the winner. As a result of technical issues with the orchestra, the music was presented through a pre-recorded playback, while the artists performed live.

==== Competing entries ====
RTSH invited interested artists and composers to submit their entries between 12 September and 20 October 2010. The deadline was later extended to 6 November 2010 in order to give more time for the artists participating in Kënga Magjike to work on their entries. On 15 November 2010, RTSH announced the 38 artists and songs selected for the competition by a special committee consisting of Altin Goci, Fatmir Hysi, Hajg Zaharian, Kozeta Mamaqi, Mefarete Laze, Thoma Gaqi and Zef Çoba.

Key: Withdrawn

Competing entries
Artist(s)	Song	Songwriter(s)	Lyricist(s)
Established category
Adhurim Demiri	"24 orët"	Adhurim Demiri	
Agim Poshka	"Bota com vetmi"	Unknown	
Alban Skënderaj and Miriam Cani	"Ende ka shpresë"	Alban Skënderaj, Miriam Cani	
Ardita Tusha	"Dikur besoja"	Unknown	
Aurela Gaçe	"Kënga ime"	Shpëtim Saraçi	Sokol Marsi
Besa Kokëdhima	"E bukura dhe bisha"	Besar Likaj	Dalina Buzi
Blerina Shalari	"Lutjes apo dashurisë"	Blerina Shalari	
Denis Hasa	"Mbi xhaketën time"	Xhavit Ujkani	Ismail Kadare
Dorian Nini	"Mirë se vini në Shqipëri"	Jetmir Barbullushi	Perikli Papingji
Dorina Garuci	"Mirëmbrëma engjëlli im"	Sokol Marsi	Jorgo Papingji
Emi Bogdo	"Letër për ty"	Suela Kalaja	
Enkeleda Arifi	"Një dashuri"	Adrian Hila	Pandi Laço
Entela Zhula	"Lojë në dashuri"	Edmond Veizaj	Entela Zhula
Ernis Cili and Onanta Spahiu (Note: Prior to the scheduled semi-finals, Radio Televizioni Shqiptar (RTSH) announced the withdrawal of Ernis Cili and Onanta Spahiu. They were replaced by Ardita Tusha.)	"FAM"	Ernis Cili	
Etmond Mancaku	"Dashuri pas emrit"	Etmond Mancaku	
Evans Rama	"Sonte"	Unknown	
Francesk Radi	"Kemi dasëm'o"	Francesk Radi	Agim Doci
Goldi Halili	"Në krahët e tu"	Fatrin Keajka	
Heldi Kraja	"E diela pa ty"	Heldi Kraja	
Herci Matmuja	"Me cilin rri ti dashuri"	Gent Myftarai	Agron Tufa
Humus (Note: Prior to the scheduled semi-finals, Radio Televizioni Shqiptar (RTSH) announced the withdrawal of Humus. They were replaced by Agim Poshka.)	"S'ka"	Humus	
Kamela Islamaj	"Jetova për ty"	A. Male	Olti Curri
Kejsi Tola	"Pranë"	Kristi Popa	Florian Zyka
Klajdi Musabelliu	"Vetëm ti"	L. Jorganxhi	Zh. Jorganxhi
Kujtim Prodani	"Ti ishe kryevepër"	Kujtim Prodani	Arben Duka
Linda Halimi (Note: Prior to the scheduled semi-finals, Radio Televizioni Shqiptar (RTSH) announced the withdrawal of Linda Halimi. She was replaced by Evans Rama.)	"Nuk e kam pritur"	Linda Halimi	
Marjeta Billo	"Perjetësi"	Klodian Qafoku	Dr. Flori
Marsida Saraci	"Vetem s'jemi në botë"	Valentin Veizi	Arben Duka
Mateus Froku	"Dimër në shpirt"	Kledi Bahiti	Dr. Flori
NRG Band	"Mina-Mina"	NRG Band	
Orges Toce	"Mari"	Orges Toce	
Selami Kolonja	"Marmara"	Selami Kolonja	
Sajmir Braho	"Shtegëtar i jetës time"	E. Sina	Sajmir Braho
Sonila Mara	"Egoist"	Sonila Mara	
Xhejsi Jorgaqi	"Rastësi"	G. Lako	J. Papingji
Newcomers category
Albi Xhepa and Semi Jaupaj	"Dritë"	Sam Jaupaj	Bojken Lako
Bledi Polena	"Të jemi të dy"	Unknown	
Ilir Kazaferi	"Nuk ke faj"	Ilir Kazaferi	
Maria Prifti	"Pasuri e pasurive"	Frederik Ndoci	A.Doci
Megi Laska	"Ëndrat ekzistojnë"	Fabian Asllani	Megi Laska
Rudina Delia	"Pa botë"	Rudina Delia	
Shpat Deda (Note: Prior to the scheduled semi-finals, Radio Televizioni Shqiptar (RTSH) announced the withdrawal of Shpat Deda. He was replaced by Bledi Polena.)	"Të kam afër"	Shpat Deda	

==== Shows ====
===== Semi-finals =====
The semi-finals of Festivali i Këngës took place on 23 December and 24 December 2010 on the respective dates. Seventeen contestants participated in each semi-final, with the highlighted ones progressing to the grand final.

Semi-final 1 – 23 December 2010
R/O	Artist(s)	Song	Result
Established category
1	Selami Kolonja	"Marmara"	Qualified
2	Alban Skënderaj and Miriam Cani	"Ende ka shpresë"	Qualified
3	Orges Toce	"Mari"	Qualified
4	Kamela Islamaj	"Jetova për ty"	Qualified
5	Blerina Shalari	"Lutjes apo dashurisë"	—N/a
6	Ernis Cili and Onanta Spahiu	"FAM"	—N/a
7	Dorian Nini	"Mirë se vini në Shqipëri"	Qualified
8	Etmond Mancaku	"Dashuri pas emrit"	—N/a
9	Ardita Tusha	"Dikur besoja"	—N/a
10	Klajdi Musabelliu	"Vetëm ti"	—N/a
11	Evans Rama	"Sonte"	—N/a
12	Dorina Garuci	"Mirëmbrëma engjëlli im"	Qualified
13	Herci Matmuja	"Me cilin rri ti dashuri"	Qualified
14	Agim Poshka	"Bota com.vetmi"	—N/a
15	Marsida Saraci	"Vetem s'jemi në botë"	Qualified
16	Entela Zhula	"Lojë në dashuri"	—N/a
Newcomers category
1	Ilir Kazaferi	"Nuk ke faj"	—N/a
2	Maria Prifti	"Pasuri e pasurive"	Qualified
3	Megi Laska	"Ëndrat ekzistojnë"	—N/a

Semi-final 2 – 24 December 2010
R/O	Artist(s)	Song	Result
Established category
1	Adhurim Demiri	"24 orët"	—N/a
2	Besa Kokëdhima	"E bukura dhe bisha"	Qualified
3	Emi Bogdo	"Letër për ty"	—N/a
4	Denis Hasa	"Mbi xhaketën time"	Qualified
5	Kujtim Prodani	"Ti ishe kryevepër"	—N/a
6	Goldi Halili	"Në krahët e tu"	Qualified
7	Marjeta Billo	"Perjetësi"	—N/a
8	Françesk Radi	"Kemi dasëm'o"	Qualified
9	Aurela Gaçe	"Kënga ime"	Qualified
10	Heldi Kraja	"E diela pa ty"	—N/a
11	Sonila Mara	"Egoist"	—N/a
12	Mateus Frroku	"Dimër në shpirt"	—N/a
13	Xhejsi Jorgaqi	"Rastësi"	Qualified
14	Enkeleda Arifi	"Një dashuri"	Qualified
15	Kejsi Tola	"Pranë"	—N/a
16	Sajmir Braho	"Shtegëtar i jetës time"	Qualified
Newcomers category
1	Albi Xhepa and Semi Jaupaj	"Dritë"	Qualified
2	Bledi Polena	"Të jemi të dy"	—N/a
3	Rudina Delia	"Pa botë"	—N/a

===== Final =====
The grand final of Festivali i Këngës took place on 25 December 2010 and was broadcast live at 20:30 (CET). Determined by the combination of the votes from a seven-member jury, Aurela Gaçe with "Kënga ime" emerged as the winner and was thus announced as Albania's representative for the Eurovision Song Contest 2011.

Final – 25 December 2010
R/O	Artist(s)	Song	Points	Result
1	Francesk Radi	"Kemi dasëm'o"	13	8
2	Herci Matmuja	"Me cilin rri ti dashuri"	7	11
3	Goldi Halili	"Në krahët e tu"	0	18
4	Marsida Saraci	"Vetem s'jemi në botë"	2	16
5	Besa Kokëdhima	"E bukura dhe bisha"	13	9
6	Alban Skënderaj and Miriam Cani	"Ende ka shpresë"	66	2
7	Enkeleda Arifi	"Një dashuri"	36	5
8	Aurela Gaçe	"Kënga ime"	82	1
9	Maria Prifti	"Pasuri e pasurive"	5	14
10	Sajmir Braho	"Shtegëtar i jetës time"	48	3
11	Dorian Nini	"Mirë se vini në Shqipëri"	34	6
12	Selami Kolonja	"Marmara"	6	12
13	Xhejsi Jorgaqi	"Rastësi"	44	4
14	Albi Xhepa and Semi Jaupaj	"Dritë"	0	18
15	Dorina Garuci	"Mirëmbrëma engjëlli im"	34	6
16	Kamela Islamaj	"Jetova për ty"	12	10
17	Orges Toce	"Mari"	3	15
18	Denis Hasa	"Mbi xhaketën time"	6	13

=== Promotion ===
A music video for "Feel the Passion" premiered via the Eurovision Song Contest's official YouTube channel on 16 March 2011. For promotional purposes, Gaçe embarked on a small tour with live performances at various events related to the contest, including in Belarus, Greece, Turkey and the Netherlands.

== At Eurovision ==
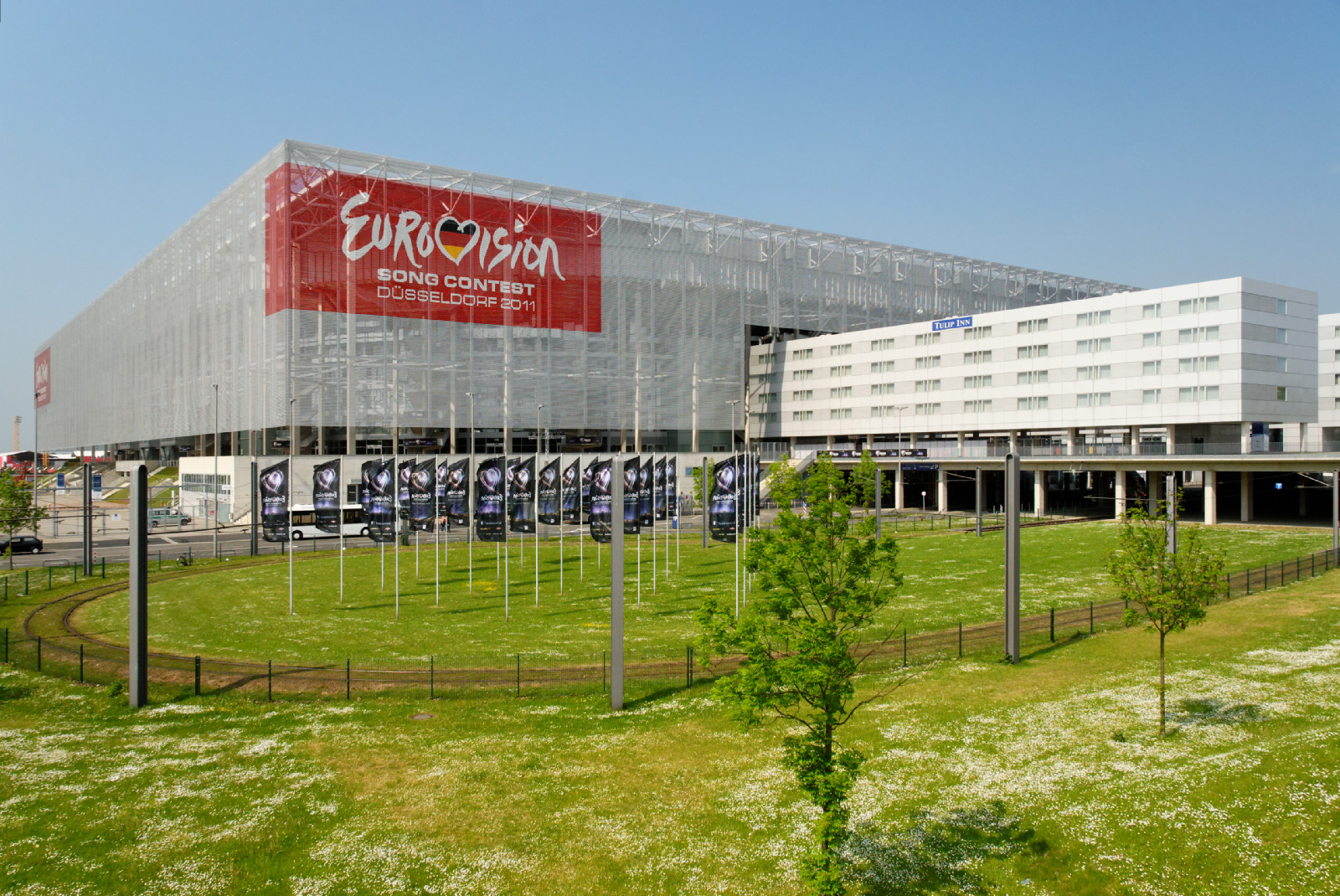
The Eurovision Song Contest 2011 took place at Esprit Arena in Düsseldorf, Germany in May 2011.

The Eurovision Song Contest 2011 took place at Esprit Arena in Düsseldorf, Germany, and consisted of two semi-finals held on 10 and 12 May, respectively, and the grand final on 14 May 2011. According to the Eurovision rules, all participating countries, except the host nation and the "Big Four", consisting of France, Germany, Spain and the United Kingdom, were required to qualify from one of the two semi-finals to compete for the grand final. The top 10 countries from the respective semi-final progress to the grand final. On 17 January 2011, a special allocation draw was held that placed each country into one of the two semi-finals, as well as which half of the show they would perform in. Albania was placed into the first semi-final, to be held on 10 May, and was scheduled to perform in the first half of the show. Once all the competing songs for the 2011 contest had been released, the running order for the semi-finals was decided by the producers of the contest rather than through another draw, for preventing similar songs being placed next to each other. Albania was set to perform in position 3, following Norway and preceding Armenia. At the end of the first semi-final, the country was not announced among the top 10 entries in the semi-final and therefore failed to qualify for the grand final, marking Albania's third non-qualification in the Eurovision Song Contest.

=== Voting ===
The tables below visualise a breakdown of points awarded to Albania in the first semi-final of the Eurovision Song Contest 2011, as well as by the country for both the second semi-final and grand final. In the semi-final, Albania finished in 14th place with a total of 47 points, including 12 from Greece and 8 from both San Marino and Turkey. In the final, Albania awarded its 12 points to Turkey in the first semi-final, and to Italy in the final of the contest.

==== Points awarded to Albania ====
Points awarded to Albania (Semi-final 1)
Score	Country
12 points	Greece
10 points	
8 points	San Marino; Turkey
7 points	Croatia
6 points	Switzerland
5 points	
4 points	Portugal
3 points	
2 points	Azerbaijan
1 point	

==== Points awarded by Albania ====
Points awarded by Albania (Semi-final 1)
Score	Country
12 points	Turkey
10 points	Greece
8 points	San Marino
7 points	Croatia
6 points	Malta
5 points	Azerbaijan
4 points	Portugal
3 points	Russia
2 points	Serbia
1 point	Norway

Points awarded by Albania (Final)
Score	Country
12 points	Italy
10 points	Greece
8 points	Azerbaijan
7 points	Bosnia and Herzegovina
6 points	United Kingdom
5 points	Spain
4 points	Russia
3 points	Ukraine
2 points	France
1 point	Serbia
