= Daria Kinzer =

Croatian-Austrian singer (born 1988)

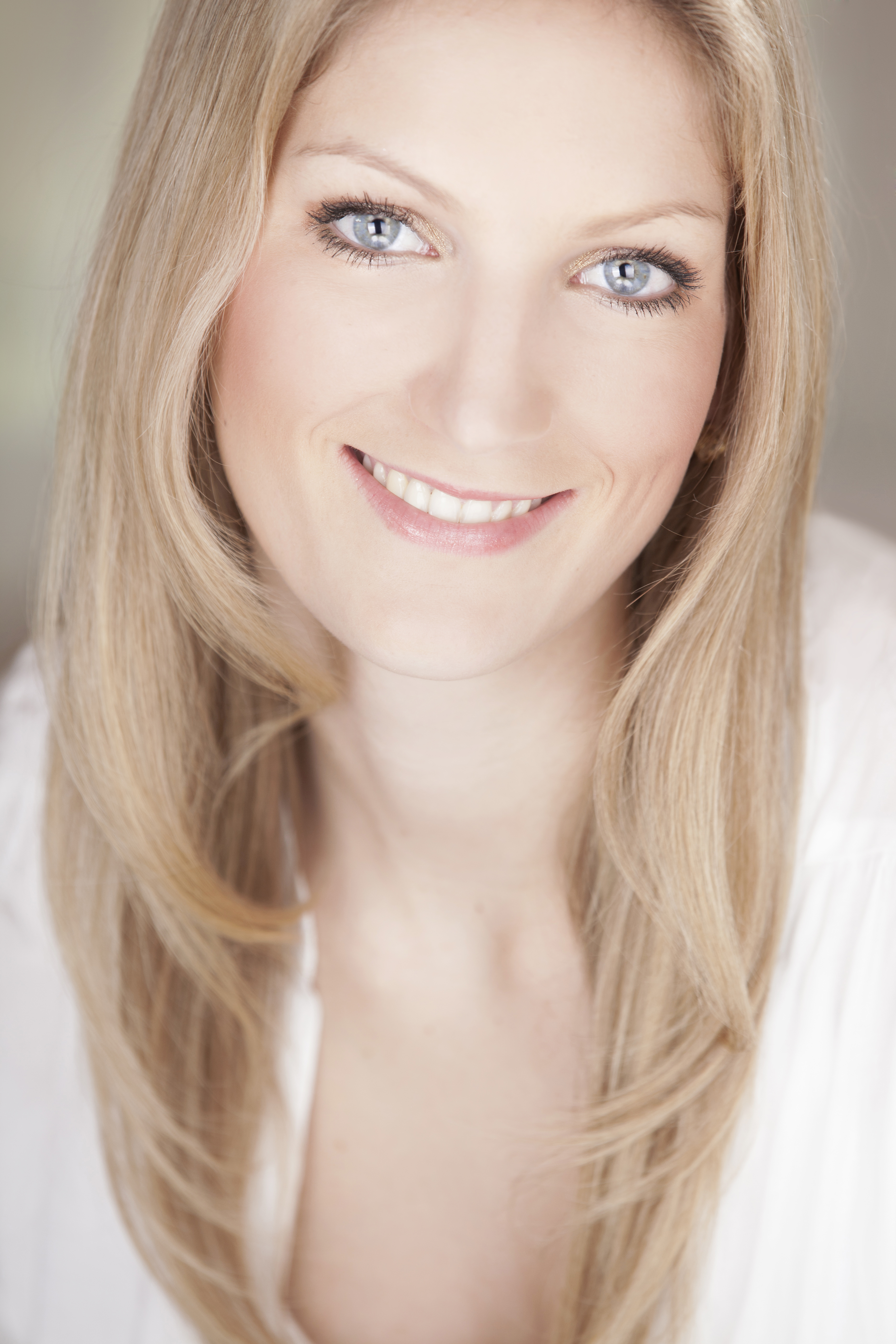

Background information
- Also known as: Daria
- Born: 29 May 1988 (age 38); Aschaffenburg, West Germany
- Origin: Zagreb, Croatia; Vienna, Austria
- Genres: Pop, Jazz
- Occupation: Singer
- Website: Official website

Daria Kinzer (born 29 May 1988) is a Croatian-Austrian singer who represented Croatia in the Eurovision Song Contest 2011 in Germany. Kinzer won the national selection on 5 March with her entry "Celebrate", and took part in the first semifinal night of the Contest finishing at 15th place. She has also recorded a German version of the "Celebrate" song, entitled "Diese Nacht". (English lyrics for "Diese Nacht" by Daria Kinzer)

Kinzer was born in Aschaffenburg, Bavaria, West Germany to a Croatian mother and German father, and speaks Croatian as well as German. She studies in Vienna.

== Discography ==
- Zwischen Himmel und Erde (2013)

Preceded by Feminnem with "Lako je sve"	Croatia in the Eurovision Song Contest; 2011	Succeeded by Nina Badrić with "Nebo"
