= Sarah Burgess (singer) =

American musician (born 1987)

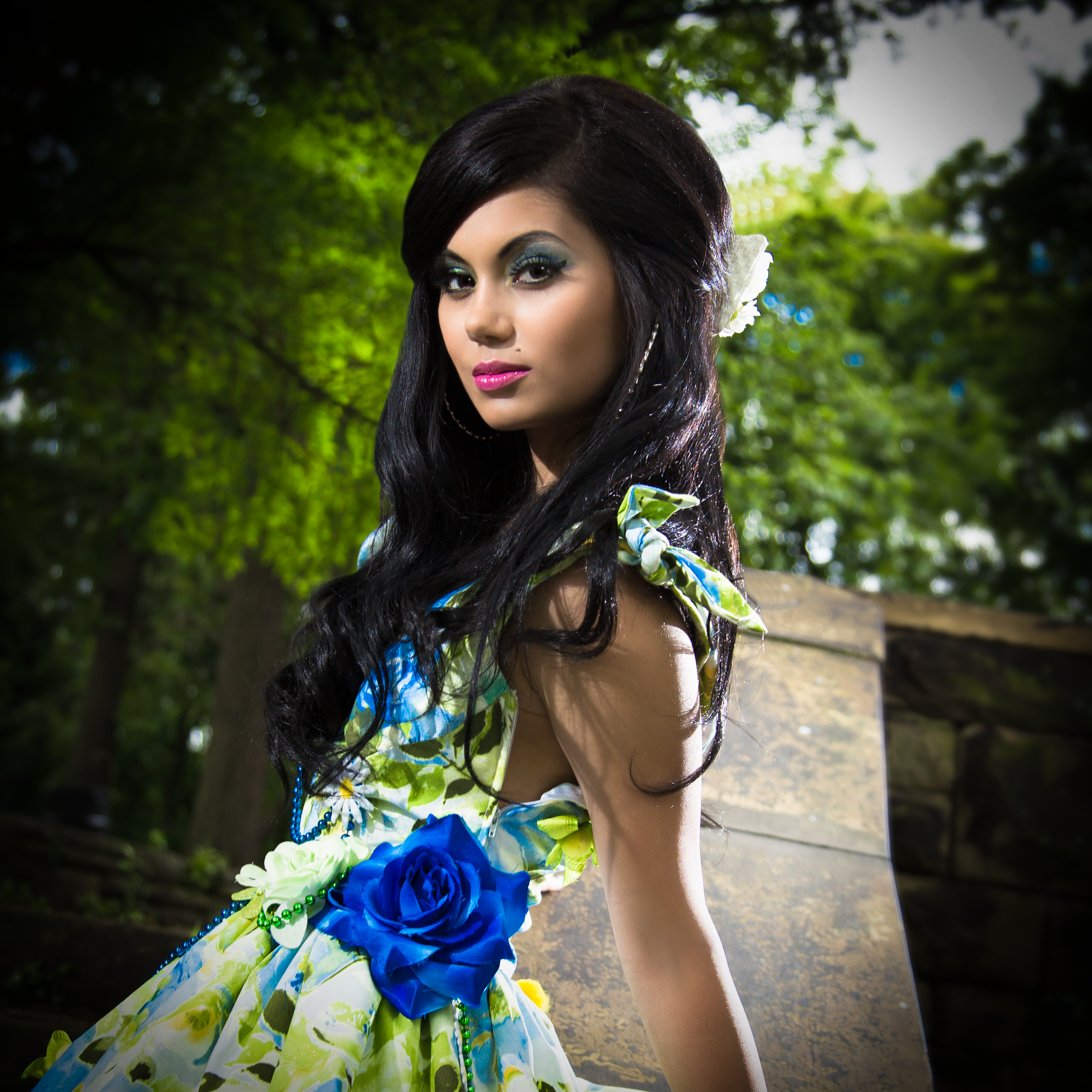

Background information
- Born: July 14, 1987 (age 37); West Chester, Pennsylvania
- Genres: Pop, pop rock, R&B
- Occupation(s): Singer-songwriter, model
- Instrument: Vocals
- Years active: 2007–present
- Labels: PME Records (2007–2009); Solymar Music (2009–18)
- Website: sarahburgessmusic.com

Sarah Burgess (born July 14, 1987) is an American singer-songwriter who was a contestant on the sixth season of the television series American Idol (cut in Hollywood week). She signed with indie label, PME Records in 2007, and released her album One in 2008 to stores in the US. In 2009, her album was released in Japan stores. In July 2009, Burgess announced she had parted ways with PME Records. Burgess went on a tour in Switzerland in September 2009.

== American Idol ==
Burgess auditioned for the sixth season of American Idol in New York City in 2007, and got through to Hollywood Week, auditioning with the song "Call Me" by Blondie. During Burgess' audition she told the judges that she had skipped school and auditioned without her parents knowledge. When she got through to Hollywood, she called her father and told him everything. She also said her father did not want her to audition for American Idol, or even to have a career in the music business.

Burgess had a strong fanbase since her audition, but during Hollywood Week the judges cut her, and she did not make the voting rounds. She was signed shortly after by an Indie label PME Records and has since released a Billboard Top 40 hit single, "Dangerouz", which was released and charted in 2008.

== Post Idol ==
After her elimination on American Idol, Burgess got offers from both indie and major recording labels. She later signed with PME Records, and recorded her album, One, with her first song being "Didn't Matter That", which was written by Colbie Caillat and Mikal Blue. Burgess also opened for Daughtry at the Colorado State Fair in 2007. She released her debut album on June 30, 2008. Her second single, "Dangerouz", was heavily played on radio stations, mainly in secondary markets.

Burgess's debut album was later released in Japan in 2009, and she was currently writing/recording her second album with PME Records, however she left PME Records in early July. She is now writing/recording the new album on her own. A European tour is also planned. Her first music video was "Dangerouz", however both VH1 and Fuse passed on showing the video.

Burgess's debut album One is now available on iTunes, as well as her EP titled Didn't Matter That and her Top 40 hit single "Dangerouz" in 2008. Music videos for "Dangerouz" and "I'm So Crushed" are not yet available on iTunes. The album is also in FYE stores.

In July 2009, Burgess announced she had parted ways with her record label PME Records and is working on signing with a new management team and record label. Burgess is currently unsigned, but in the process of recording her second studio album. Her second studio album is looking towards a 2010 release.

In September 2009, Burgess toured all of Switzerland on a tour for a month. This was her first tour since leaving PME Records and being unsigned. The tour ended September 28, 2009.

Burgess indicated her new album would be more edgy rock, but mainstream pop as well. Burgess said, "I am so proud and finally feel as if I am 100% going into the right direction" regarding the new album.

In October 2009, Burgess announced she had signed with a new record label, Solymar Music.

In October 2010, Burgess entered her new single "Just Me" into the open online competition of Swiss television SF, to represent Switzerland in the Eurovision Song Contest 2011; she was chosen as one of the 12 finalists to compete in the National Final, Die grosse Entscheidungs Show where she placed 6th.

On May 31, 2013, Burgess' second album "Just Me" was released. The album's first single is "Thank You Very Much For Absolutely Nothing".

== Personal life ==
Burgess is a native of East Palestine, Ohio. She resides in Beaver Falls, Pennsylvania with her husband Mark.

== Philanthropy ==
Sarah Burgess, in conjunction with CureDuchenne, has started "The Run Away Project" and has also written the song titled "Run Away" in honor of her brother Jacob and people diagnosed with Duchenne muscular dystrophy.

== Discography ==
=== Albums ===
Title	Album details
One	Released: June 30, 2008; Label: PME Records; Formats: CD, Digital download
Just Me	Released: May 31, 2013; Label: Iceberg Records / Solymar Music; Formats: CD, Digital download

=== Singles ===
Year	Title	Chart positions	Album
Year	Title	US Hot 100	Album
2008	"Dangerouz"	–	One
2008	"I'm So Crushed"	–	One
2013	"Thank You Very Much (For Absolutely Nothing)"	–	Just Me
