= Let It Go (Anna Rossinelli song) =

Single by Anna Rossinelli

from the album Marylou
- Released: March 6, 2013
- Recorded: 2012–13
- Genre: Indie pop
- Length: 2:53
- Label: Universal Music
- Songwriter(s): Georg Schlunegger; Anna Rossinelli; Georg Dillier; Manuel Meisel
- Producer(s): Georg Schlunegger

Anna Rossinelli singles chronology
"See What You've Done" (2012)	"Let It Go" (2013)	"Shine in the Light" (2014)

"Let It Go" is a song performed by Swiss singer Anna Rossinelli from her second studio album Marylou. The single was released on March 6, 2013, as a digital download in Switzerland. The song was written by Georg Schlunegger, Anna Rossinelli, Georg Dillier and Manuel Meisel.

== Track listing ==
Digital download
No.	Title	Length
1.	"Let It Go"	2:53

== Credits and personnel ==
- Lead vocals – Anna Rossinelli
- Producer – Georg Schlunegger
- Lyrics – Georg Schlunegger, Anna Rossinelli, Georg Dillier, Manuel Meisel
- Label: Universal Music

== Chart performance ==
=== Weekly charts ===
Chart (2013)	Peak position
Switzerland (Schweizer Hitparade)	26

== Release history ==
Region	Date	Format	Label
Switzerland	March 6, 2013	Digital download	Universal Music
