= Anna Rossinelli =

Swiss singer-songwriter

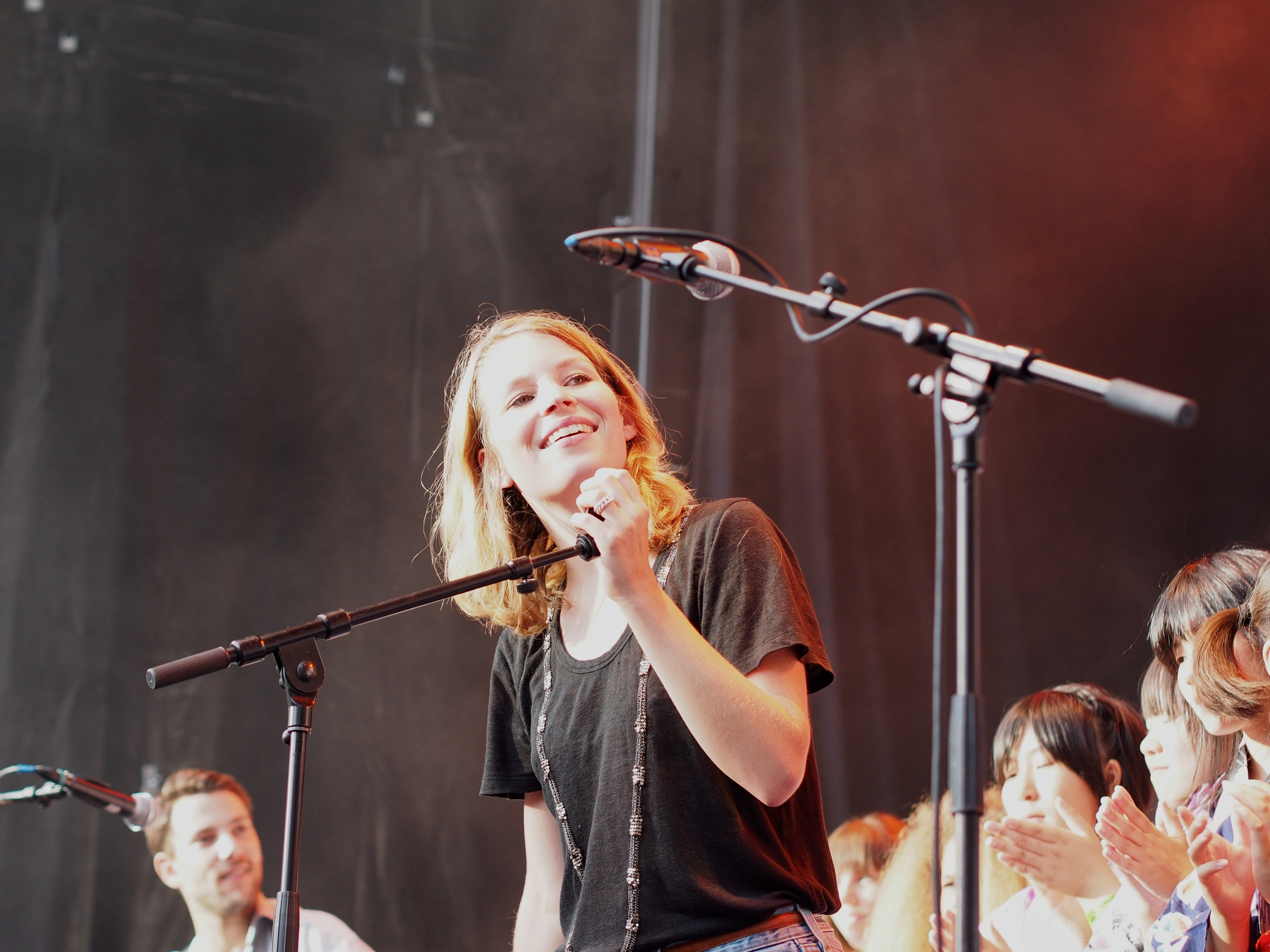
- Anna Rossinelli at the Openair auf dem Bundesplatz 2012, Bern

Background information
- Born: 20 April 1987 (age 39)
- Origin: Basel, Switzerland
- Genre: Pop
- Years active: 2000–present
- Label: Sony Music
- Members: Anna Rossinelli Georg Dillier Manuel Meisel
- Website: http://www.annarossinellimusic.com

Anna Rossinelli (born 20 April 1987 in Basel) is a Swiss singer-songwriter. Rossinelli is part of a pop-soul trio band of her name. Georg Dillier and Manuel Meisel are also part of the trio.

== Music career ==
=== Eurovision Song Contest ===
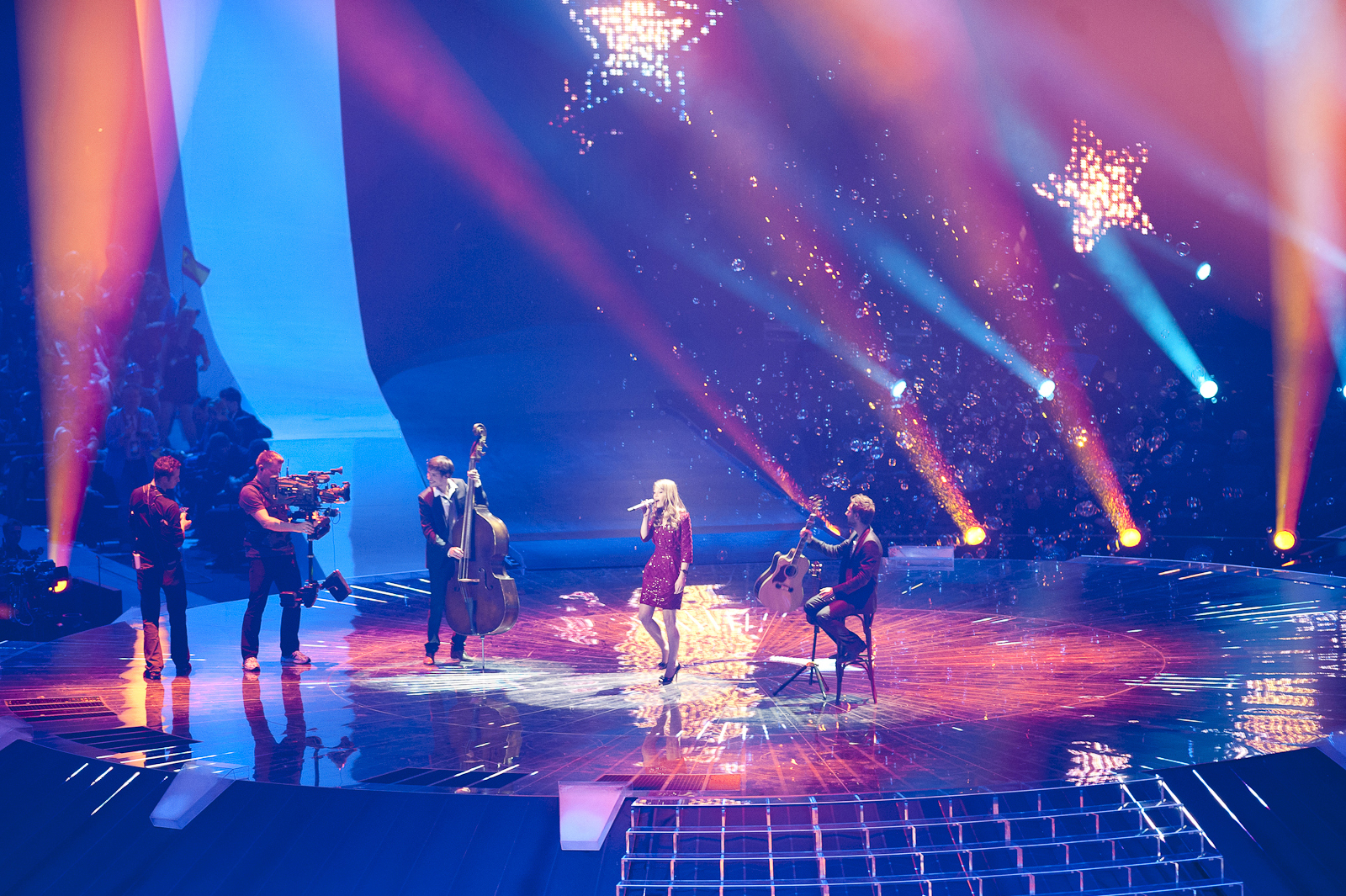
Anna Rossinelli at Eurovision 2011

On 11 December 2010, Rossinelli won the Swiss national final (Die grosse Entscheidungs Show), with the song In Love for a While and represented Switzerland at the Eurovision Song Contest 2011 in Düsseldorf, Germany. On 10 May 2011, she joined the first semifinal of the show. She entered the finale successfully thanks to the jury vote. Unfortunately, Switzerland ended up last that year.

=== 2011-present: Bon Voyage and present ===
On 14 October 2011, Rossinelli released the lead single from her debut album Joker. It was written by Phillipa Alexander, Ellie Wyatt, Alex Ball, Vicky Nolan. It was produced by Fred Herrmann. She released her debut album Bon Voyage on 9 December 2011.

On 6 March 2013, her next single was published. Let It Go is the first single from her upcoming album, Marylou which was released on 3 May 2013 and debuted at number one.

On 7 February 2014, Rossinelli re-release her album Marylou under the new title Marylou Two with the bonus tracks Shine In The Light, Let It Go (Live), Vagabonds (Live), Reconcile and Shine In The Light (Piano Version). The Swiss television studio SRF used the single Shine in the Light as their official song for the broadcast of the 2014 Winter Olympic.

After the fifth album Takes Two To Tango, Anna Rossinelli released a fifth album on the 18 January 2019. The album had singles such as Union, Jewellery, Feel It and Hold Your Head Up, which was also the lead single of the album White Garden. Due to the COVID-19 pandemic, the tour accompanying this album was cancelled. At the end of 2022, the band announced a new album called Mother for the upcoming summer. On 22 February 2023, the "Mother"-Tour was announced after the release of the album in the fall of that year.

== Discography ==
=== Albums ===
Year	Title	Peak chart positions	Album Details
Year	Title	SWI	Album Details
2011	Bon Voyage	10 (10 weeks)	Released: 9 December 2011
2013	Marylou	1 (9 weeks)	Released: 3 May 2013
2014	Marylou Two	7 (8 weeks)	Released: 4 February 2014
2015	Takes Two to Tango	7 (9 weeks)	Released: 27 November 2015
2019	White Garden	1 (7 weeks)	Released: 18 January 2019
2023	Mother	3 (3 weeks)	Released: 22 September 2023
2025	Heat	3	Released: 21 November 2025

=== Singles ===
Year	Single	Peak chart positions	Album
Year	Single	SWI	Album
2011	In Love for a While	3	Non-album single
2011	Joker	—	Bon Voyage
2012	See What You've Done	—	Bon Voyage
2013	Let It Go	26	Marylou
2014	Shine in the Light	4	Marylou Two
2015	Bang Bang Bang	—	Takes Two to Tango
2018	Hold Your Head Up	88	White Garden
2020	Victoria Line	19	Non-album single available on Pegasus' album Unplugged
2024	Over	—	Non-album single
2025	Heat	—	—
"—" denotes single that did not chart or was not released.

Preceded by Michael von der Heide with Il pleut de l'or	Switzerland in the Eurovision Song Contest; 2011	Succeeded by Sinplus with Unbreakable
