= Nina Radojičić =

Serbian singer

Danica Prodanović
- Даница Продановић
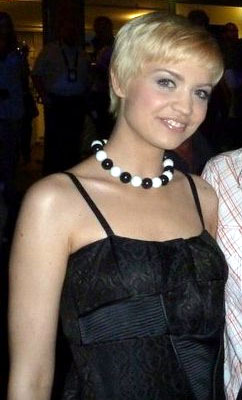
- Born: Danica Radojčić; 5 August 1989 (age 37); Belgrade, SR Serbia, SFR Yugoslavia
- Education: University of Belgrade; University of Melbourne
- Spouse: Veljko Prodanović
- Scientific career
- Fields: Pharmacology

Nina
- Born: Danica Radojičić
- Genres: Pop, pop rock, soul
- Occupation: Singer
- Instruments: Vocals, piano
- Years active: 2011–present
- Label: PGP RTS

Danica "Nina" Prodanović (née Radojičić; Serbian Cyrillic: Даница "Нина" Продановић (Радојичић), pronounced [dǎnitsa prodanoʋitɕ]; born 5 August 1989), is a Serbian singer and pharmacologist.

She represented Serbia in the Eurovision Song Contest 2011 with the song "Čaroban", composed by Kristina Kovač, and placed fourteenth in the final.

== Life and career ==
=== Early life and career (1989–2010) ===
Nina was born as Danica Radojčić on 5 August 1989 in Belgrade (Yugoslavia then, Serbia now). She has an older brother, Stefan. Nina began playing the piano aged six, and also attended dance classes. She finished both elementary and secondary musical school, but she entered pharmacy at the University of Belgrade. She has performed in various clubs with her band "Legal Sex Department". Nina cites "Duffy, Muse, and other pop and alternative artists" as her major influences.

=== Eurovision Song Contest and debut album (2011–present) ===
On 19 January 2011, Radio Television of Serbia (RTS) announced that the three members of the Kovač family — Kornelije, Aleksandra and Kristina — would compose three songs that would compete to represent Serbia in the Eurovision Song Contest 2011. On 16 February, it was confirmed that Kristina Kovač had chosen Nina, then an unknown singer, to perform her song "Čaroban". Kovač discovered Nina thanks to YouTube. On 26 February, Nina was chosen for the Serbian entry at the Eurovision Song Contest 2011 in Düsseldorf, Germany, with more than 15,000 SMS votes.

In March, Nina recorded the English version of the song, called "Magical". On 9 April, she performed at the Eurovision In Concert in Amsterdam to promote her song, along with 19 other participants. At the Eurovision Song Contest, Nina performed sixth in the first semi-final, after Yüksek Sadakat from Turkey and before Alexey Vorobyov from Russia, and qualified for the final. She performed the 24th in the final, after Mika Newton from Ukraine and before Eldrine from Georgia, and placed 14th.

In June 2011, Nina announced she would release her debut studio album through the PGP RTS. In an interview for OGAE Serbia, Nina stated that she had moved to Melbourne, Australia and that she was currently pursuing her PhD in immunopharmacology. She also stated that the plans to record an album through the PGP RTS had been scrapped.

== Discography ==
- 2008 — "Dokaži da me voliš"
- 2011 — "Čaroban"
- 2016 — "Colors of my love"
- 2020 — "Nemoćna"

== See also ==
- Eurovision Song Contest 2011
- Serbia in the Eurovision Song Contest
- Serbia in the Eurovision Song Contest 2011

== Publications ==
- Prodanovic D, Keenan CR, Langenbach S, Li M, Chen Q, Lew MJ, et al. Cortisol limits selected actions of synthetic glucocorticoids in the airway epithelium. FASEB J. 2017;
- Xia YC, Radwan A, Keenan CR, Langenbach SY, Li M, Radojicic D, et al. Glucocorticoid Insensitivity in Virally Infected Airway Epithelial Cells Is Dependent on Transforming Growth Factor-β Activity. PLoS Pathog. 2017;13(1).
- Keenan CR, Radojicic D, Li M, Radwan A, Stewart AG. Heterogeneity in mechanisms influencing glucocorticoid sensitivity: The need for a systems biology approach to treatment of glucocorticoid-resistant inflammation. Vol. 150, Pharmacology and Therapeutics. 2015. p. 81–93.

Awards and achievements
Preceded by Milan Stanković with Ovo je Balkan	Serbia in the Eurovision Song Contest; 2011	Succeeded by Željko Joksimović with Nije ljubav stvar
