= San Marino in the Eurovision Song Contest 2011 =

- Eurovision Song Contest 2011
- Participating broadcaster: San Marino RTV (SMRTV)
- Country: San Marino
- Selection process: Internal selection
- Announcement date: Artist: 3 February 2011; Song: 11 March 2011

Competing entry
- Song: "Stand By"
- Artist: Senit
- Songwriters: Radiosa Romani

Placement
- Semi-final result: Failed to qualify (16th)

Participation chronology

San Marino was represented at the Eurovision Song Contest 2011, held in Düsseldorf, Germany. The Sammarinese national broadcaster San Marino RTV (SMRTV) confirmed the country's second participation in the contest on 22 November 2010, marking their return after not participating in 2009 and 2010. Italian singer Senhit Zadik Zadik, under the stage name Senit, was internally selected by SMRTV to represent San Marino with the song "Stand By". The entry was promoted through the creation of a music video, a promotional tour throughout Europe and an interview to the press in the lead up to the Eurovision Song Contest 2011. San Marino performed 12th in the first semi-final, held on 10 May 2011, and placed 16th, receiving 34 points and failing to qualify for the final.

== Background ==
Prior to the 2011 contest, San Marino had participated in the Eurovision Song Contest once, when it debuted at the 2008 contest. San Marino RTV (SMRTV) had first announced the nation's debut in late November 2007. For their first appearance, SMRTV hosted an internal selection process, choosing the band Miodio with the song "Complice". At the contest, San Marino finished last with five points in the first semi-final, failing to qualify for the final. San Marino did not return to the 2009 or 2010 contests, citing financial difficulties. On 10 December 2010, it was announced that the nation was on the provisional list of countries seeking to take part in the Eurovision Song Contest 2011 in Düsseldorf, Germany. On 22 December, San Marino's Head of Delegation Alessandro Capicchioni confirmed the country's intent to take part, marking their return to the contest after a two-year absence.

== Before Eurovision ==
=== Internal selection ===
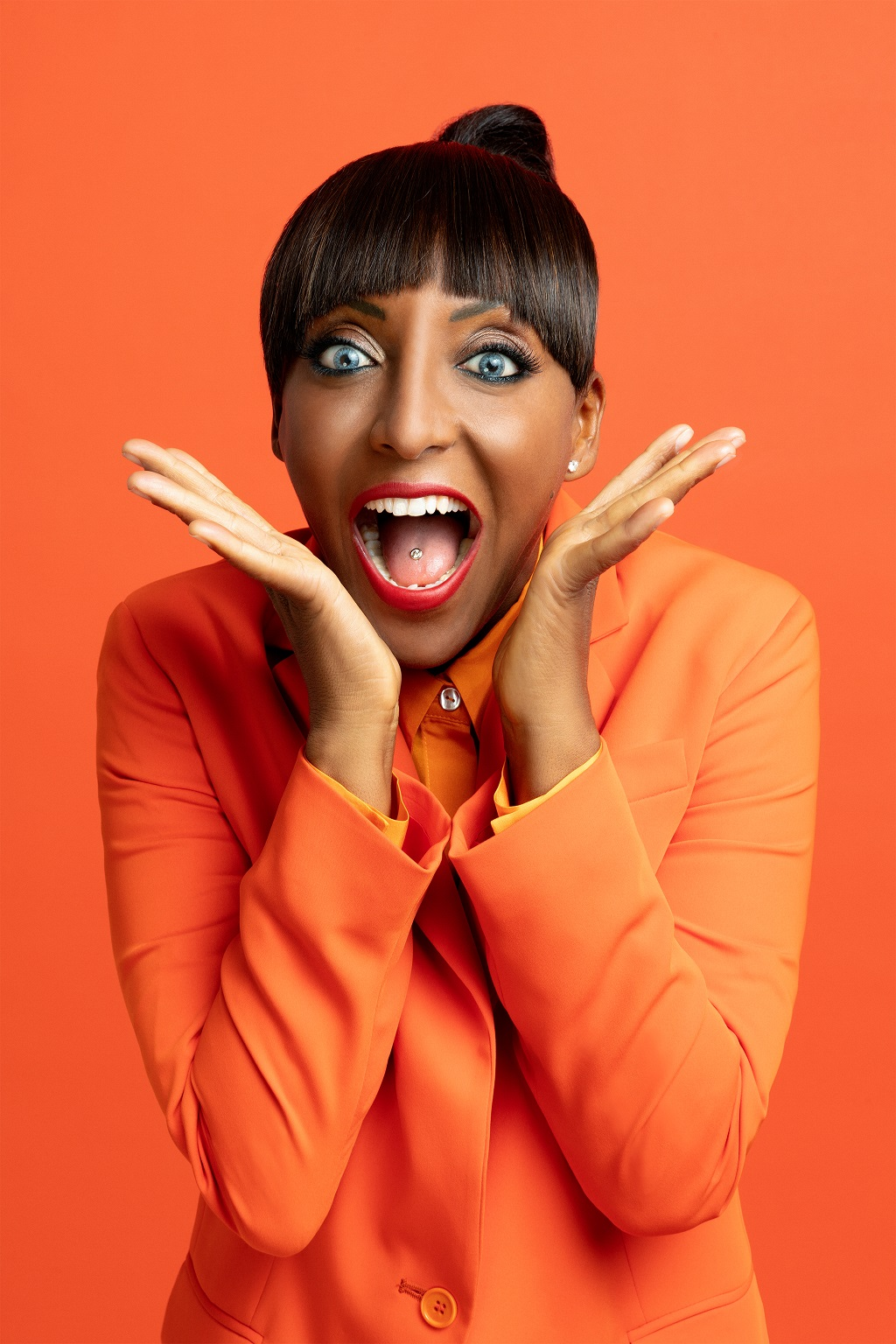
Senit was internally selected by SMRTV to represent San Marino in the Eurovision Song Contest 2011.

On 3 February 2011, SMRTV held a press conference at their headquarters where they announced that they had internally selected Italian singer Senit to represent San Marino at the Eurovision Song Contest 2011. Senit was selected to represent San Marino by the broadcaster and a selection committee which included project manager Eddy Anselmi. SMRTV stated in a press release: "As well as a good placement in the contest, our goals are to have our entry in the European airplays and charts. Senit will represent the international and open-minded side of our Republic, following the path of other small countries like Luxembourg and Monaco, who have achieved great results in the Eurovision History".

A special presentation programme to reveal Senit's song was held on 11 March 2011 at the broadcaster's studio, hosted by Emanuela Rossi and broadcast on SMRTV as well as online via the official Eurovision Song Contest website eurovision.tv. At the programme, "Stand By" was presented as the song to represent San Marino in the Eurovision Song Contest 2011. The song was written and composed by Radiosa Romani with production by German music producer Christian Lohr. In regards to the song, Senit stated that she opted to perform in English as it would be better suited for an international audience, while also letting them differentiate themselves from Italy who would be performing in Italian.

=== Promotion ===
To promote the entry, a music video for "Stand By" was filmed in London and San Marino and released as part of the song's presentation on 11 March 2011. A promotional tour saw Senit performing in nearly 40 countries including Albania, Malta, Greece, Turkey, Georgia and the United Kingdom. On 9 April, Senit was one of several participants of 2011 who participated in the third annual Eurovision in Concert series, an event held at Club Air in Amsterdam, Netherlands staged to serve as a preview party for the year's entries. She and her backing vocalists were interviewed by website ESCToday on 2 May 2011 after their first technical rehearsal, speaking about their experiences performing the song and what viewers could expect for their final performance. In the lead up to the contest, the delegation hosted a Eurovision-themed party on 8 May, where Senit performed the song live. Invitations to the event were also extended to contestants from other countries competing that year, encouraging them to perform as well.

== At Eurovision ==
The Eurovision Song Contest 2011 took place at the Düsseldorf Arena in Düsseldorf, Germany. It consisted of two semi-finals held on 10 and 12 May, respectively, and the final on 14 May 2011. According to the Eurovision rules, all participating countries, except the host nation and the "Big Five", consisting of France, Germany, Italy, Spain and the United Kingdom, were required to qualify from one of the two semi-finals to compete for the final; the top 10 countries from the respective semi-finals would proceed to the final.

On 17 January 2011, an allocation draw was held that placed each country into one of the two semi-finals, with San Marino being placed into the first semi-final, to be held on 10 May. Once all the competing songs for the Eurovision Song Contest 2011 had been released, the running order for the semi-finals was decided by another draw, which was held on 15 March in Düsseldorf. The nation was assigned to perform at position 12, following Malta and preceding Croatia. Lia Fiorio and Gigi Restivo served as commentators for the television and radio broadcasts, which were also streamed online.

Senit competed 12th in the first semi-final of the contest on 10 May 2011. Flanked by two guitar players and three backing vocalists, she appeared on stage wearing a tight fitting dress designed by British designer Elizabeth Emanuel, who had also designed Princess Diana's wedding dress. In a press release, SMRTV described the stage presence as a club-like atmosphere featuring smoke fountains and spotlights surrounded by black LED screens. Susan Duncan Smith served as Senit's production manager, while the performance's choreography was created by Shaun Fernandes, who had previously contributed to the contest for the UK's 1993, 1994 and 2002 entries. Fernandes also served as stage director, managing camera angles and the overall positioning of the ensemble on the stage.

=== Voting ===
Below is a breakdown of points awarded to San Marino in the first semi-final of the Eurovision Song Contest 2011, as well as by the country in the semi-final and final, respectively. In the first semi-final, San Marino came 16th with 34 points; the nation was awarded 19th place with 8 points by the public and awarded 8th place with 74 points by the jury. Nicola Della Valle, a group member of San Marino's 2008 entrants Miodio, was the Sammarinese spokesperson announcing the country's voting results.

==== Points awarded to San Marino ====
Points awarded to San Marino (Semi-final 1)
Score	Country
12 points	
10 points	
8 points	Albania
7 points	
6 points	Azerbaijan; Malta
5 points	Armenia; Turkey
4 points	
3 points	
2 points	Greece
1 point	Croatia; Georgia

==== Points awarded by San Marino ====
Points awarded by San Marino (Semi-final 1)
Score	Country
12 points	Malta
10 points	Turkey
8 points	Albania
7 points	Armenia
6 points	Greece
5 points	Azerbaijan
4 points	Croatia
3 points	Serbia
2 points	Georgia
1 point	Russia

Points awarded by San Marino (Final)
Score	Country
12 points	Italy
10 points	Azerbaijan
8 points	Greece
7 points	Georgia
6 points	Sweden
5 points	Serbia
4 points	Denmark
3 points	France
2 points	United Kingdom
1 point	Slovenia
