= Marylou (album) =

Studio album by Anna Rossinelli
- Released: 3 May 2013 (Marylou); 4 February 2014 (Marylou Two)
- Recorded: 2013
- Genre: Pop
- Label: Universal Music

Anna Rossinelli chronology
Bon Voyage (2011)	Marylou (2013)	Takes Two to Tango (2015)

Singles from Marylou
- 1. "Let It Go" Released: 6 March 2013; 2. "Shine in the Light" Released: February 2014

Marylou is the second studio album by Swiss singer-songwriter Anna Rossinelli. The album was released on 3 May 2013 by Universal Music. The first single from the album was "Let It Go" and it was released on 6 March 2013. The album was re-released under the new title Marylou Two on 4 February 2014, with the bonus tracks "Shine in the Light", "Let It Go (Live)", "Vagabonds (Live)", "Reconcile" and "Shine In The Light (Piano Version)".

== Singles ==
"Let It Go" was released as the album's lead single on 6 March 2013. "Shine in the Light" was released as the lead single from Marylou Two in February 2014.

== Track listing ==
Marylou
No.	Title	Writer(s)	Producer(s)	Length
1.	"Let It Go"	Georg Schlunegger, Anna Rossinelli, Georg Dillier, Manuel Meisel	Georg Schlunegger	2:53
2.	"So Damn Pretty"	Schlunegger, Rossinelli, Dillier, Meisel	Schlunegger	3:01
3.	"Until"	Schlunegger, Rossinelli, Dillier, Meisel	Schlunegger	3:48
4.	"Vagabonds" (feat. Célien Schneider)	Schlunegger, Rossinelli, Dillier, Meisel	Schlunegger	2:40
5.	"Marylou"	Schlunegger, Rossinelli, Dillier, Meisel	Schlunegger	2:40
6.	"Pretty Normal Guy"	Schlunegger, Rossinelli, Dillier, Meisel	Schlunegger	3:03
7.	"Head In the Sky"	Schlunegger, Rossinelli, Dillier, Meisel	Schlunegger	2:47
8.	"Chain Reaction"	Schlunegger, Rossinelli, Dillier, Meisel	Schlunegger	3:45
9.	"Burn This City Down" (feat. Dieter Meier)	Schlunegger, Rossinelli, Dillier, Meisel	Schlunegger	3:29
10.	"Go Go"	Schlunegger, Rossinelli, Dillier, Meisel	Schlunegger	2:56
11.	"She's So Him"	Schlunegger, Rossinelli, Dillier, Meisel	Schlunegger	3:07
12.	"Polaroid Picture"	Schlunegger, Rossinelli, Dillier, Meisel	Schlunegger	3:59

Marylou Two
No.	Title	Length
13.	"Shine in the Light"	3:15
14.	"Let It Go (Live)"	3:19
15.	"Vagabonds (Live)"	4:40
16.	"Reconcile"	3:14
17.	"Shine In The Light (Piano Version)"	4:06

== Chart performance ==
=== Marylou ===
Chart (2013)	Peak position
Swiss Albums (Schweizer Hitparade)	1

=== Marylou Two ===
Chart (2014)	Peak position
Swiss Albums (Schweizer Hitparade)	7

== Release history ==
Type	Region	Date	Format	Label
Original	Switzerland	3 May 2013	Digital download	Universal Music
Re-release	Switzerland	7 February 2014	Digital download	Universal Music
