= Kënga Magjike 2015 =

Kënga Magjike 2015 was the 2015 edition of the Kënga Magjike that took place in the Palace of Congresses in Tirana, Albania. There were two semifinals (3 & 4 December 2015) and a final (5 December 2015). 55 songs were heard in advance by the public at home, which narrowed them down to 40 songs by televoting. These songs competed in the semi-finals but only 20 made it to the final. In the end, Aurela Gaçe won the first prize. Endri Prifti and Juliana Pasha were the runners up. The winner was determined by the singers who voted for each other.
