= Serbia in the Eurovision Song Contest 2011 =

- Eurovision Song Contest 2011
- Participating broadcaster: Radio Television of Serbia (RTS)
- Country: Serbia
- Selection process: Pesma za Evropu - Diseldorf 2011
- Selection date: 26 February 2011

Competing entry
- Song: "Čaroban"
- Artist: Nina
- Songwriters: Kristina Kovač

Placement
- Semi-final result: Qualified (8th, 67 points)
- Final result: 14th, 85 points

Participation chronology

Serbia was represented at the Eurovision Song Contest 2011 with the song "Čaroban" written by Kristina Kovač. The song was performed by Nina. The Serbian national broadcaster, Radio Television of Serbia (RTS) organised the national final Pesma za Evropu - Diseldorf 2011 in order to select the Serbian entry for the 2011 contest in Düsseldorf, Germany. Kornelije Kovač and his two daughters Aleksandra Kovač and Kristina Kovač were selected to each compose a song for the national final on 26 February 2011, which resulted in "Čaroban" performed by Nina as the winner entirely by a public televote.

Serbia was drawn to compete in the first semi-final of the Eurovision Song Contest which took place on 10 May 2011. Performing during the show in position 6, "Čaroban" was announced among the top 10 entries of the first semi-final and therefore qualified to compete in the final on 14 May. It was later revealed that Serbia placed eighth out of the 19 participating countries in the semi-final with 67 points. In the final, Serbia performed in position 24 and placed fourteenth out of the 25 participating countries, scoring 85 points.

== Background ==
Prior to the 2011 contest, Serbia had participated in the Eurovision Song Contest four times since its first entry in 2007, winning the contest with their debut entry "Molitva" performed by Marija Šerifović. Since 2007, three out of four of Serbia's entries have featured in the final with the nation failing to qualify in 2009. Serbia's 2010 entry "Ovo je Balkan" performed by Milan Stanković qualified to the final and placed thirteenth.

The Serbian national broadcaster, Radio Television of Serbia (RTS), broadcasts the event within Serbia and organises the selection process for the nation's entry. RTS confirmed their intentions to participate at the 2011 Eurovision Song Contest on 11 June 2010. Between 2007 and 2009, Serbia used the Beovizija national final in order to select their entry. However, after their 2009 entry, "Cipela" performed by Marko Kon and Milaan, failed to qualify Serbia to the final, the broadcaster shifted their selection strategy to selecting specific composers to create songs for artists. In 2010, RTS selected Goran Bregović to compose songs for a national final featuring three artists.

== Before Eurovision ==
=== Pesma za Evropu - Diseldorf 2011 ===
Pesma za Evropu - Diseldorf 2011 (transl. Song for Europe - Düsseldorf 2011) was the national final organised by RTS in order to select the Serbian entry for the Eurovision Song Contest 2011. The selection was held on 26 February 2011 at the studios of RTS in Košutnjak, Belgrade, hosted by Maja Nikolić and broadcast on RTS 1, RTS Sat and RTS Digital as well as streamed online via the broadcaster's website rts.rs and the official Eurovision Song Contest website eurovision.tv.

==== Competing entries ====
RTS announced during a press conference on 19 January 2011 that Kornelije Kovač, who represented Yugoslavia in 1974 as part of the band Korni Grupa, and his two daughters Aleksandra Kovač and Kristina Kovač would each compose one song for the national final. Each composer also selected the performer for their song and the competing entries were announced on 16 February 2011.

Artist	Song	Songwriter(s)
Aleksandra Kovač	"Idemo dalje" (Идемо даље)	Aleksandra Kovač, Spomenka Kovač
Breeze	"Ring Ring Ring"	Kornelije Kovač, Aleksandar Eraković, Damjan Dašić, Marko Ćalić
Nina	"Čaroban" (Чаробан)	Kristina Kovač

==== Final ====
The final took place on 26 February 2011 where the three competing songs were performed together with a live studio band and the RTS Big Band. The winner, "Čaroban" performed by Nina, was decided exclusively by the Serbian public via SMS voting. Former Eurovision contestants Karolina Gočeva, who represented Macedonia in 2002 and 2007, Boris Novković, who represented Croatia in 2005, Dado Topić, who represented Croatia in 2007, and Jelena Tomašević, who represented Serbia in 2008, singers Aleksandra Radović, Nina Badrić and Tanja Banjanin, bands Peti Element and Zemlja Gruva, and actors Milan Kalinić, Nikola Bulatović and Mina Lazarević were featured as guests during the show.

R/O	Artist	Song	Televote	Place
1	Breeze	"Ring Ring Ring"	4,049	3
2	Aleksandra Kovač	"Idemo dalje"	5,994	2
3	Nina	"Čaroban"	14,900	1

== At Eurovision ==
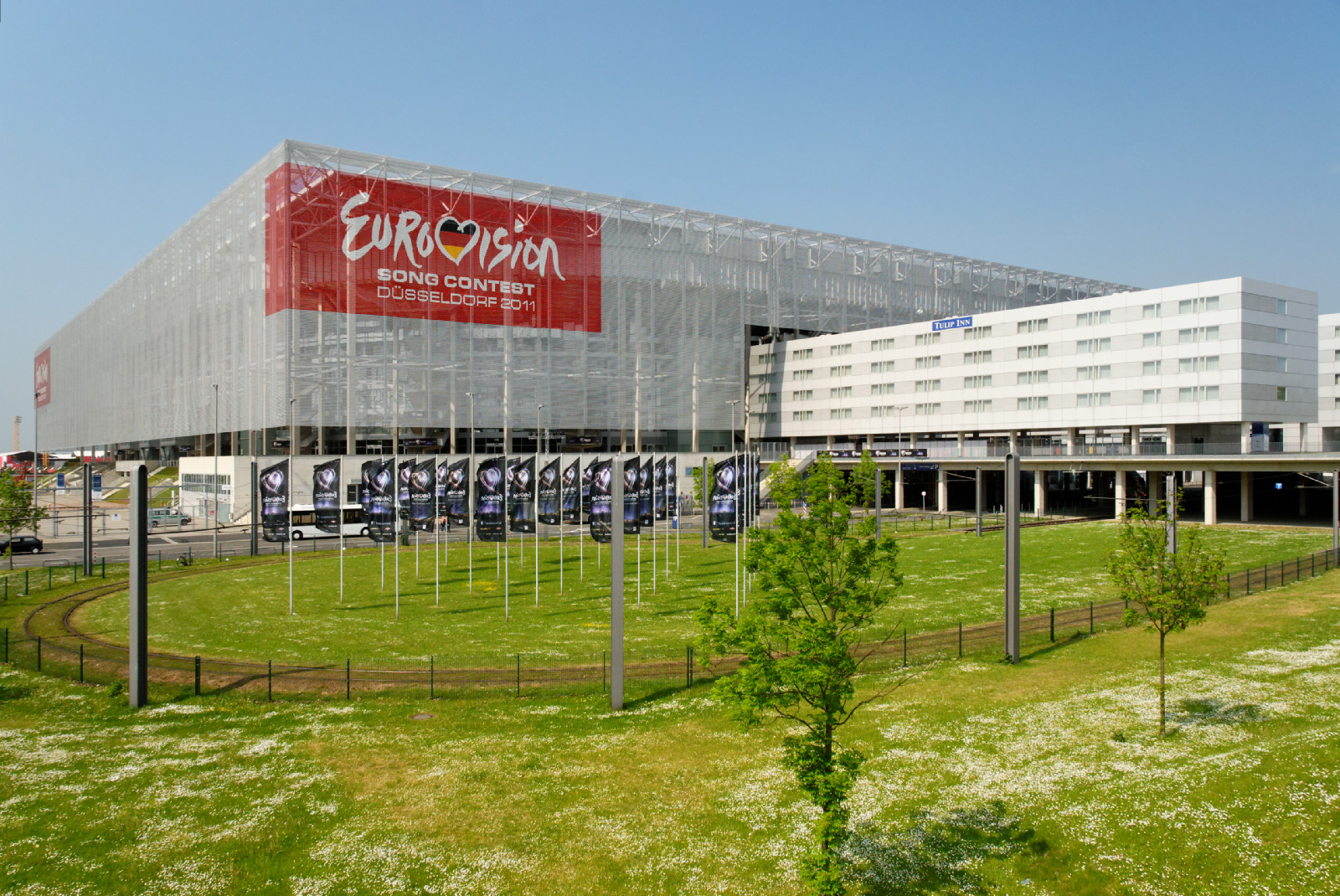
The Eurovision Song Contest 2011 took place at the Düsseldorf Arena in Düsseldorf, Germany.

According to Eurovision rules, all nations with the exceptions of the host country and the "Big Five" (France, Germany, Italy, Spain and the United Kingdom) are required to qualify from one of two semi-finals in order to compete for the final; the top ten countries from each semi-final progress to the final. The European Broadcasting Union (EBU) split up the competing countries into six different pots based on voting patterns from previous contests, with countries with favourable voting histories put into the same pot. On 17 January 2011, an allocation draw was held which placed each country into one of the two semi-finals, as well as which half of the show they would perform in. Serbia was placed into the first semi-final, to be held on 10 May 2011, and was scheduled to perform in the first half of the show. The running order for the semi-finals was decided through another draw on 15 March 2011 and Serbia was set to perform in position 6, following the entry from Turkey and before the entry from Russia.

The two semi-finals and the final were broadcast in Serbia on RTS 1, RTS Sat and RTS Digital with commentary for the first semi-final by Marina Nikolić, commentary for the second semi-final by Dragan Ilić and commentary for the final by Duška Vučinić-Lučić. The three shows were also broadcast via radio on Radio Belgrade with commentary by Tanja Zeljković. The Serbian spokesperson, who announced the Serbian votes during the final, was Dušica Spasić.

=== Semi-final ===
Nina took part in technical rehearsals on 1 and 5 May, followed by dress rehearsals on 9 and 10 May. This included the jury show on 9 May where the professional juries of each country watched and voted on the competing entries.

The Serbian performance featured Nina performing in a grey and white dress with white tights together with three backing vocalists in dresses of various colours. The choreography and staging of the performance interpreted the late 1960's theme of the song. The background LED screens displayed pink spirals on a silver backdrop which later transitioned to a rainbow-themed tunnel. The director and choreographer of the Serbian performance was Miloš Paunović. The three backing vocalists that joined Nina on stage were: Tijana Bogićević, Sanja Bogosavljević and Saška Janković.

At the end of the show, Serbia was announced as having finished in the top 10 and subsequently qualifying for the grand final. It was later revealed that Serbia placed eighth in the semi-final, receiving a total of 67 points.

=== Final ===
Shortly after the first semi-final, a winners' press conference was held for the ten qualifying countries. As part of this press conference, the qualifying artists took part in a draw to determine the running order for the final. This draw was done in the order the countries were announced during the semi-final. Serbia was drawn to perform in position 24, following the entry from Ukraine and before the entry from Georgia.

Nina once again took part in dress rehearsals on 13 and 14 May before the final, including the jury final where the professional juries cast their final votes before the live show. Nina performed a repeat of her semi-final performance during the final on 14 May. Serbia placed fourteenth in the final, scoring 85 points.

=== Voting ===
Voting during the three shows consisted of 50 percent public televoting and 50 percent from a jury deliberation. The jury consisted of five music industry professionals who were citizens of the country they represent. This jury was asked to judge each contestant based on: vocal capacity; the stage performance; the song's composition and originality; and the overall impression by the act. In addition, no member of a national jury could be related in any way to any of the competing acts in such a way that they cannot vote impartially and independently.

Following the release of the full split voting by the EBU after the conclusion of the competition, it was revealed that Serbia had placed thirteenth with the public televote and eighth with the jury vote in the final. In the public vote, Serbia scored 89 points, while with the jury vote, Serbia scored 111 points. In the first semi-final, Serbia placed fourteenth with the public televote with 42 points and fourth with the jury vote, scoring 102 points.

Below is a breakdown of points awarded to Serbia and awarded by Serbia in the first semi-final and grand final of the contest. The nation awarded its 12 points to Croatia in the semi-final and to Bosnia and Herzegovina in the final of the contest.

==== Points awarded to Serbia ====
Points awarded to Serbia (Semi-final 1)
Score	Country
12 points	Croatia; Switzerland
10 points	
8 points	
7 points	Finland; Norway
6 points	Poland
5 points	Iceland
4 points	Russia
3 points	Lithuania; Malta; San Marino
2 points	Albania; Spain
1 point	Portugal

Points awarded to Serbia (Final)
Score	Country
12 points	
10 points	Bosnia and Herzegovina; Slovenia
8 points	Croatia; Macedonia
7 points	Austria
6 points	Norway; Poland; Switzerland
5 points	Lithuania; San Marino
4 points	Spain
3 points	Italy; Netherlands
2 points	Finland
1 point	Albania; Armenia

==== Points awarded by Serbia ====
Points awarded by Serbia (Semi-final 1)
Score	Country
12 points	Croatia
10 points	Hungary
8 points	Iceland
7 points	Greece
6 points	Russia
5 points	Malta
4 points	Georgia
3 points	Finland
2 points	Switzerland
1 point	Lithuania

Points awarded by Serbia (Final)
Score	Country
12 points	Bosnia and Herzegovina
10 points	Slovenia
8 points	Hungary
7 points	Lithuania
6 points	Ukraine
5 points	Switzerland
4 points	Russia
3 points	Greece
2 points	Italy
1 point	Sweden
