= Bon Voyage (Anna Rossinelli album) =

Studio album by Anna Rossinelli
- Released: 9 December 2011
- Recorded: 2011
- Genre: Pop
- Label: Universal Music
- Producer: Fred Herrmann

Anna Rossinelli chronology
Bon Voyage (2011)	Marylou (2013)

Singles from Bon Voyage
- 1. "Joker" Released: 14 October 2011; 2. "See What You've Done" Released: 12 April 2012

Bon Voyage is the debut studio album and by the Swiss singer-songwriter Anna Rossinelli, released on 9 December 2011, by Universal Music. The album includes the single "Joker". The album was produced by Fred Herrmann and entered the Swiss Albums Chart at number 10. The song "No One" was available for free on iTunes before the release of the album.

== Singles ==
- "Joker" was released as the album's first single on 14 October 2011. The song was written by Phillipa Alexander, Ellie Wyatt, Alex Ball and Vicky Nolan and produced by Fred Herrmann.
- "See What You've Done" was released as the album's second single. The video was released on 12 April 2012.

== Track listing ==
No.	Title	Writer(s)	Producer(s)	Length
1.	"Holiday"	Kim Richey, Lisa Mitchell, Sacha Skarbeck	Fred Herrmann	2:56
2.	"Accident Waiting To Happen"	Lauren Christy, Karen Poole, Greg Kurstin, Eliza Caird	Herrmann	3:18
3.	"See What You've Done"	Roman Camenzind, Georg Schlunegger	Herrmann	2:40
4.	"Amazing"	David Holler, Dick Holler, Anna Rossinelli, Georg Dillier	Herrmann	3:21
5.	"You Are"	Rossinelli, Dillier, Manuel Meisel	Herrmann	3:26
6.	"Strawberry Cream"	David Jürgens, Olivia Uhlig	Herrmann	3:24
7.	"Joker"	Phillipa Alexander, Ellie Wyatt, Alex Ball, Vicky Nolan	Herrmann	3:38
8.	"Hello Boy"	Rossinelli, Dillier, Meisel	Herrmann	3:09
9.	"Sunny Afternoon"	Schlunegger	Herrmann	3:26
10.	"100 Days"	Bassel El Hallak, Lennart A. Salomon, Aimée Proal	Herrmann	3:02
11.	"No One"	Schlunegger	Herrmann	2:46
12.	"The Reason I Stay"	Rossinelli, Dillier	Herrmann	2:28

iTunes bonus track
No.	Title	Length
13.	"Wonderful"	3:19

== Chart performance ==
Chart (2011)	Peak position
Swiss Albums Chart	10

== Release history ==
Country	Date	Format	Label
Switzerland	9 December 2011	Digital download, CD	Universal Music
