= Aurela Gaçe =

Albanian singer-songwriter and actress (born 1974)

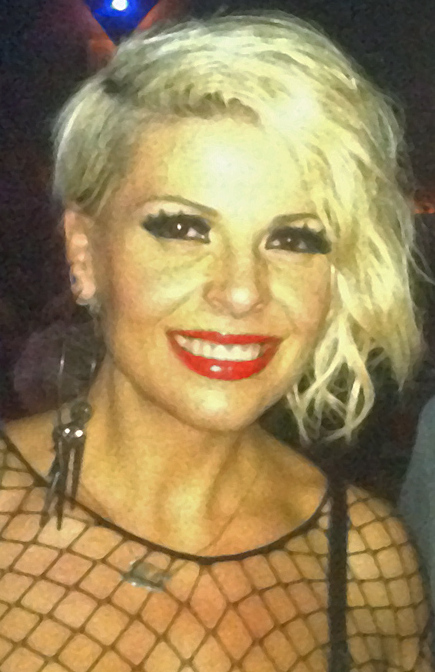
- Gaçe in 2012

Background information
- Born: 16 October 1974 (age 51); Llakatund, Vlorë, Albania
- Genres: Pop-folk; jazz; soul
- Occupations: Singer-songwriter; actress
- Years active: 1982–present
- Website: aurelagace.com

Aurela Gaçe (pronounced [auˈɾɛla ˈɡatʃɛ]; born 16 October 1974) is an Albanian singer-songwriter, actress and television personality. Her music career made her to be called as the diva of South Albania.

== Awards ==
A three-time Festivali i Këngës winner, a three-time Kënga Magjike winner and a two-time Balkan Music Award winner for Balkan's Song of the Year and Best Singer from Albania. She was a judge on the third season of The Voice of Albania.

In 2010, she won the 49th edition of Festivali i Këngës with the song "Kënga ime" and represented Albania in the Eurovision Song Contest 2011 held in Düsseldorf, Germany.

== Life and career ==
Aurela Gaçe was born on 16 October 1974 into an Albanian family in the village of Llakatund, Vlorë, then part of the People's Socialist Republic, present Albania.

In 2010 Gaçe won the 49th edition of "Festivali i Këngës" with "Kënga Ime", written by Shpëtim Saraçi. Her most successful song Origjinale (feat. Dr. Flori & Marsel) has more than 20 million views on YouTube.

After experiencing success during the late 1990s and early 2000s, Gaçe quit singing and moved to the United States where she spent 8 years. She returned to the music industry in 2010 releasing "Origjinale", a song composed by Flori Mumajesi, that became a success in Albania. In late 2010, Gaçe was invited by Shpëtim Saraçi to participate in the Festivali i Këngës. Initially she denied the request, as she stated "It is time for new artists to be promoted with original music performed by an orchestra". However, she later decided to participate.

=== Eurovision Song Contest ===
Gaçe participated in the Festivali i Këngës, 10 years after her last participation. She won for the third time, and was chosen to represent her Albania in the Eurovision Song Contest 2011, which was held in Düsseldorf, Germany. Gaçe flew to Los Angeles, California to record the final version of her song, cooperating with Capitol Records. Later, it was announced that the song title would be "Feel the Passion", as the song was translated to English. The final version was released on 12 March 2011.

Gaçe appeared on the first semi-final of the Eurovision Song Contest 2011, performing third. She finished 14th in total with 47 points, thus failing to qualify to the final of the competition.

== Discography ==
=== Albums ===
- 1998: Oh Nënë
- 1998: The Best
- 2001: Tundu Bejke
- 2001: Superxhiro
- 2008: Mu Thanë Sytë
- 2012: Paraprakisht

=== Singles ===
- 1993: "Pegaso"
- 1994: "Nuk mjafton"
- 1995: "Nata"
- 1996: "Me jetën dashuruar"
- 1997: "Pranvera e vonuar"
- 1997: "Fati ynë, shpresë dhe marrëzi"
- 1998: "E pafajshme jam"
- 1999: "S'jam tribu"
- 2000: "Cimica"
- 2001: "Jetoj"
- 2007: "Hape veten"
- 2008: "Bosh"
- 2009: "Mu thanë sytë"
- 2009: "Jehonë" (feat. West Side Family)
- 2010: "Origjinale" (feat. Dr. Flori & Marsel)
- 2010: "Kënga ime"
- 2011: "Feel the Passion"
- 2011: "CA$H" (feat. Mc Kresha)
- 2012: "Tranzit"
- 2012: "Boom Boom Boom"
- 2012: "Ja ke nge"
- 2013: "Shpirt i shpirtit tim"
- 2013: "Dua"
- 2014: "Merrem sonte"
- 2014: "Pa kontroll" (feat. Young Zerka)
- 2015: "Akoma jo"
- 2016: "Nënë e imja nënë"
- 2017: "S'mundem"
- 2017: "S'nuk" (feat. Fifi)
- 2020: "Lento"

== See also ==
- Albania in the Eurovision Song Contest 2011
- Awards and nominations received by Aurela Gaçe

Awards and achievements
| Preceded by Albërie Hadërgjonaj; Rovena Dilo; Juliana Pasha | Festivali i Këngës Winner; 1999; 2001; 2010 | Succeeded by Rovena Dilo; Mira Konçi; Rona Nishliu |
| Preceded by Armend Rexhepagiqi; Besa Kokëdhima; Herself and Young Zerka | Kënga Magjike Winner; 2007; 2014 (with Young Zerka); 2015 | Succeeded by Jonida Maliqi; Herself; Rozana Radi |
| Preceded by (Serbia) Željko Joksimović with Ljubavi | Performer of The Best Song in Balkans; 2010 | Succeeded by (Albania) Elvana Gjata with Afër dhe larg |
| Preceded by Juliana Pasha with It's All About You | Albania in the Eurovision Song Contest; 2011 | Succeeded by Rona Nishliu with Suus |
