= Feel the Passion =

2011 song by Aurela Gaçe

Single by Aurela Gaçe

from the album Paraprakisht
- Released: 15 April 2011
- Studio: The Village, Los Angeles, U.S.
- Genre: Pop; rock
- Length: 3:01
- Label: EMI
- Composer(s): Shpëtim Saraçi
- Lyricist(s): Sokol Marsi

Aurela Gaçe singles chronology
"Origjinale" (2010)	"Feel the Passion" (2011)	"Ca$h" (2011)

Music video
- "Feel The Passion" on YouTube

Eurovision Song Contest 2011 entry
- Country: Albania
- Artist(s): Aurela Gaçe
- Language: English
- Composer(s): Shpëtim Saraçi
- Lyricist(s): Sokol Marsi

Finals performance
- Semi-final result: 14th
- Semi-final points: 47

Entry chronology
- ◄ "It's All About You" (2010)
- "Suus" (2012) ►

"Feel the Passion" is a song by Albanian singer Aurela Gaçe. It was issued as a CD single on 15 April 2011 by EMI. The English-language pop and rock song was composed by Shpëtim Saraçi and written by Sokol Marsi. An accompanying music video premiered on the official YouTube channel of the Eurovision Song Contest on 16 March 2011. The song represented Albania in the Eurovision Song Contest 2011 in Düsseldorf, Germany, after Gaçe won the pre-selection competition Festivali i Këngës with the Albanian-language version "Kënga ime". It failed to qualify for the grand final in fourteenth place marking the country's third non-qualification in the contest. During her show, Gaçe was accompanied by three backing vocalists and two instrumentalists, while the Albanian theme was visually amplified by the wings of a white and red coloured eagle on the LED screens.

== Background and composition ==
In 2010, Aurela Gaçe was announced as one of the contestants selected to compete in the 49th edition of Festivali i Këngës, a competition to determine Albania's participant for the Eurovision Song Contest 2011. As part of the competition's rules, the lyrics of the participating entries had to be in the Albanian language. The singer took part with the Albanian-language song "Kënga ime" written by Sokol Marsi and composed by Shpëtim Saraçi. For the purpose of the singer's Eurovision Song Contest participation, "Kënga ime" was remastered and translated to "Feel the Passion". It was recorded and reworked at Village Studios in Los Angeles, the United States. Musically, it is an English-language pop and rock song.

== Promotion and release ==
An accompanying music video for the song premiered onto the official YouTube channel of the Eurovision Song Contest on 16 March 2011. The colourful and vibrant video contains footage of several Albanian tourist attractions, including in the cities of Shkodër in the north of the country and Dhërmi, Gjirokastër, Ksamil and Vlorë in the south. For further promotion, Gaçe made several appearances throughout Europe to perform the song on various occasions, including in Amsterdam and Minsk. On the same month, she also appeared to sing the song on the Turkish television shows Gün Sonu, Gülay Kuriş ile Life Style and Beyaz Show, as well as on the Greek television show Kous Kous. The song was released as a CD single in various countries through EMI. In 2012, the song was included on the singer's sixth studio album Paraprakisht.

== At Eurovision ==
=== Festivali i Këngës ===
The national broadcaster of Albania, Radio Televizioni Shqiptar (RTSH), organised the 49th edition of Festivali i Këngës to select the country's entrant for the Eurovision Song Contest 2011 in Düsseldorf, Germany. It took place in December 2010, for which 32 songs had been internally shortlisted by a jury panel made up of music professionals. Following the grand final, Aurela Gaçe and her song "Kënga ime" was chosen to represent Albania in the contest, after the votes of an expert jury panel were combined, resulting in 81 total points.

=== Düsseldorf ===
The 56th edition of the Eurovision Song Contest took place in Düsseldorf, Germany, and consisted of two semi-finals on 10 and 12 May, and the grand final on 14 May 2011. According to the Eurovision rules, each participating country, except the host country and the "Big Five", consisting of France, Germany, Italy, Spain and the United Kingdom, were required to qualify from one of the two semi-finals to compete for the grand final, although, the top ten countries from the respective semi-final progress to the grand final. On 17 January 2011, it was announced that "Feel the Passion" would be performed in the first half of the first semi-final of the contest. During the live show, Albania performed third, following Norway and preceding Armenia, and failed to qualify for the grand final in fourteenth place with 47 points, ranking eleventh by the jury's 61 points and thirteenth by the televote of 42 points.

During Gaçe's Albanian-themed performance, she was accompanied by three female backing vocalists, a drummer and a guitarist. She was wearing a beige flowing dress and her backing vocalists and instrumentalist were dressed in black. The LED screens in the background displayed large white wings of a flying eagle mixed with red colours representing the flag and theme of Albania. Her show also featured a variety of red colours with turning white spotlights, while pyrotechnics and smoke were used along the performance.

== Track listing ==
- CD
1. "Feel the Passion" – 3:01

== Release history ==
Region	Date	Format	Label	Ref.
Various	15 April 2011	CD	EMI	
United Kingdom	18 April 2011	CD	EMI	
Italy	19 April 2011	CD	EMI	
