= Switzerland in the Eurovision Song Contest 2011 =

- Eurovision Song Contest 2011
- Participating broadcaster: Swiss Broadcasting Corporation (SRG SSR)
- Country: Switzerland
- Selection process: Die grosse Entscheidungs Show 2011
- Selection date: 11 December 2010

Competing entry
- Song: "In Love for a While"
- Artist: Anna Rossinelli
- Songwriters: David Klein

Placement
- Semi-final result: Qualified (10th, 55 points)
- Final result: 25th, 19 points

Participation chronology

Switzerland was represented at the Eurovision Song Contest 2011 with the song "In Love for a While" written by David Klein. The song was performed by Anna Rossinelli. The Swiss entry for the 2011 contest in Düsseldorf, Germany was selected through the national final Die grosse Entscheidungs Show 2011, organised by the Swiss German speaking broadcaster Schweizer Fernsehen (SF) and radio station DRS 3 in collaboration with the other broadcasters part of the Swiss Broadcasting Corporation (SRG SSR). SF, DRS 3, the Swiss-French broadcaster Télévision Suisse Romande (TSR) and the Swiss-Italian broadcaster Radiotelevisione svizzera (RSI) each conducted varying selections and a total of twelve entries were selected to advance to the televised national final—seven artists and songs from the SF selection, three from the DRS 3 selection, one from the TSR selection and one from the RSI selection. The twelve finalists performed during the national final on 11 December 2010 were public voting ultimately selected "In Love for a While" performed by Anna Rossinelli as the winner.

Switzerland was drawn to compete in the first semi-final of the Eurovision Song Contest which took place on 10 May 2011. Performing during the show in position 8, "In Love for a While" was announced among the top 10 entries of the first semi-final and therefore qualified to compete in the final on 14 May. This marked the second time Switzerland managed to qualify to the final, which they achieved after six years since 2005. It was later revealed that Switzerland placed tenth out of the 19 participating countries in the semi-final with 55 points. In the final, Switzerland performed in position 13 and placed twenty-fifth (last) out of the 25 participating countries, scoring 19 points.

== Background ==
Prior to the 2011 contest, Switzerland had participated in the Eurovision Song Contest fifty-one times since its first entry in 1956. Switzerland is noted for having won the first edition of the Eurovision Song Contest with the song "Refrain" performed by Lys Assia. Their second and, to this point, most recent victory was achieved in 1988 when Canadian singer Céline Dion won the contest with the song "Ne partez pas sans moi". Following the introduction of semi-finals for the 2004, Switzerland had managed to participate in the final two times up to this point. In 2005, the internal selection of Estonian girl band Vanilla Ninja, performing the song "Cool Vibes", qualified Switzerland to the final where they placed 8th. Due to their successful result in 2005, Switzerland was pre-qualified to compete directly in the final in 2006. Since 2007, the nation failed to qualify to the final with a string of internal selections. In 2010, Switzerland earned one of their lowest results of all time, with Michael von der Heide and his song "Il pleut de l'or" placing last in their semi-final earning only 2 points.

The Swiss national broadcaster, the Swiss Broadcasting Corporation (SRG SSR), broadcasts the event within Switzerland and organises the selection process for the nation's entry. SRG SSR confirmed their intentions to participate at the 2011 Eurovision Song Contest on 1 September 2010. Along with their participation confirmation, the broadcaster also announced that the Swiss entry for the 2011 contest would be selected through a national final for the first time since 2004 due to increased popularity for Eurovision in Switzerland after victories for Norway and Germany. Switzerland has selected their entry for the Eurovision Song Contest through both national finals and internal selections in the past. Between 2005 and 2010, the Swiss entry was internally selected for the competition.

== Before Eurovision ==
=== Die grosse Entscheidungs Show 2011 ===
The logo of Die grosse Entscheidungs Show

Die grosse Entscheidungs Show 2011 was the first edition of the Swiss national final format that selected Switzerland's entry for the Eurovision Song Contest 2011. The national final was a collaboration between three broadcasters in Switzerland: the Swiss-German broadcaster Schweizer Fernsehen (SF) and radio station DRS 3, the Swiss-French broadcaster Télévision Suisse Romande (TSR) and the Swiss-Italian broadcaster Radiotelevisione svizzera (RSI). The show took place on 11 December 2010 at the Bodensee Arena in Kreuzlingen, hosted by Sven Epiney and was televised on SRF 1, RSI La 2 and TSR 2. The competition was also broadcast via radio on DRS 3.

==== Selection process ====
The selection process took place in two stages before the finalists for the live show and ultimately the winner are selected. The first stage of the competition included SF, DRS 3, TSR and RSI each conducting varying selections in order to determine the candidates they submitted for the second stage of the competition. SF submitted six candidates, DRS 3 submitted three candidates, and TSR and RSI each submitted one candidate. The twelve artists and songs proceed to the second stage, the televised national final, where the winning artist and song was selected to represent Switzerland in Düsseldorf.

- The SF selection involved an online internet voting platform where interested artists could submit their songs and have them listed for public listening. The platform accepted entries between 1 October 2010 and 30 October 2010. 327 entries were submitted following the submission deadline, including entries from 1983 and 1985 Swiss entrant Mariella Farré, 2004 Swiss entrant Piero Esteriore, 2007 Danish entrant DQ and 2008 Sammarinese entrants Miodio. Internet users had between 1 and 10 November 2010 to vote for their favourite entries and their votes were combined with the votes from an expert jury. On 16 November 2010, the top seven entries and SF candidates for the national final were announced.
- The DRS 3 selection involved artists submitting their songs through an online platform between 1 October 2010 and 30 October 2010. All submitted entries were discussed by a jury panel consisting of Sascha Rossier, Tamara Steffen and Patrik Lütolf during the DRS 3 programme ESC-Club, which together with listeners selected ten of the entries for an internet vote held between 2 and 12 November 2010. The top three entries and DRS 3 candidates for the national final were announced on 12 November 2010.
- Following an internal selection, the TSR candidate for the national final was announced on 19 November 2010.
- RSI opened a submission period between 1 October 2010 and 30 October 2010 for interested artists and composers to submit their entries. On 3 November 2010, a jury panel consisting of Marco Trovesi, Mauro Ravarelli and Nicola Albertoni evaluated the 46 entry submissions received and selected five songs for the regional final RSI Eurosong Contest, which took place on 10 November 2010 at the Hotel Besso in Lugano and was broadcast via radio on RSI Rete Uno. The combination of results from public televoting (50%), an expert jury consisting of Barbara Berta, Giuliana Castellani and Renato Reichlin (40%) and internet voting held between 3 and 9 November 2010 (10%) selected "Surrender" performed by Orpheline as the RSI candidate for the national final, however the song was withdrawn by the artist on 22 November 2010 and replaced the following day by "Barbie Doll" performed by Scilla, which came third, as runner-up "Play the Trumpet" performed by Vittoria Hyde was disqualified for being published prior to the 1 September 2010 deadline, making it ineligible for the Eurovision Song Contest.

RSI Eurosong Contest – 10 November 2010
R/O	Artist	Song	Place	Result
1	Scilla	"Barbie Doll"	3	Advanced
2	Néo	"Learning to Love"	—	—N/a
3	Orpheline	"Surrender"	1	Withdrawn
4	Maxi B feat. Marco	"Most Likely – Probabilmente"	—	—N/a
5	Vittoria Hyde	"Play the Trumpet"	2	Disqualified

DRS 3 selection – 12 November 2010
Artist	Song	Percentage	Place
Anetta Morozova feat. Wilder Berg	"Sky"	—	—
Dominique Borriello	"Il ritmo dentro di noi"	20.39%	1
Dorian Gray	"No Seasons"	—	—
Duke	"Waiting for Ya"	19.88%	2
Evelyn	"Who Do You Love?"	—	—
Fräkmündt	"D'Draachejongfer"	—	—
Ilira and the Colors	"Home"	16.10%	3
Lucas	"Hot Temptation"	—	—
Scilla	"Barbie Doll"	—	—
Simongad	"I Will Stand (for the Nation)"	—	—

Competing entries
Artist	Song	Songwriter(s)	Channel
Aliose	"Sur les pavés"	Alizé Oswald, Xavier Michel	TSR
Andrina	"Drop of Drizzle"	Andi Schneider, Martina Denzinger	SF
Anna Rossinelli	"In Love for a While"	David Klein	SF
Bernarda Brunović	"Confidence"	Bernarda Brunović	SF
CH	"Gib nid uf"	Reto Burrell, Marc A. Trauffer	SF
Dominique Borriello	"Il ritmo dentro di noi"	Dominique Borriello	DRS 3
Duke	"Waiting for Ya"	Silvio Panosetti	DRS 3
Ilira and the Colors	"Home"	Andreas Renggli, Fabian Liechti	DRS 3
Polly Duster	"Up to You"	Ralf Zünd	SF
Sarah Burgess	"Just Me"	Sarah Burgess, John Gordon, Lene Dissing	SF
Scilla	"Barbie Doll"	Scilla Hess Siekmann	RSI
The Glue	"Come What May"	Michael Moor, Gregor Beermann, Tumasch Clalüna, Jonas Göttin, Oliver Rudin	SF

==== Final ====
The final took place on 11 December 2010. The twelve candidate songs in contention to represent Switzerland were performed and televoting solely selected "In Love for a While" performed by Anna Rossinelli as the winner. An expert panel consisting of Baschi (singer), Nik Hartmann (presenter) and former Swiss Eurovision Song Contest entrants Pepe Lienhard (1977), Peter Reber (1971, 1976, 1979 and 1981) and Francine Jordi (2002) also provided commentary and feedback to the entries. In addition to the performances from the competing entries, Baschi performed his song "Ha di nit vergässe" as the interval act.

Final – 11 December 2010
R/O	Artist	Song	Televote	Place
1	Polly Duster	"Up to You"	4.36%	8
2	Duke	"Waiting for Ya"	2.66%	11
3	Andrina	"Drop of Drizzle"	3.30%	9
4	Bernarda Brunović	"Confidence"	13.36%	2
5	Anna Rossinelli	"In Love for a While"	23.93%	1
6	Aliose	"Sur les pavés"	6.49%	7
7	Dominique Borriello	"Il ritmo dentro di noi"	2.33%	12
8	Scilla	"Barbie Doll"	2.88%	10
9	CH	"Gib nid uf"	11.73%	4
10	Ilira and the Colors	"Home"	13.05%	3
11	Sarah Burgess	"Just Me"	7.70%	6
12	The Glue	"Come What May"	8.21%	5

=== Promotion ===
Anna Rossinelli made several appearances across Europe to specifically promote "In Love for a While" as the Swiss Eurovision entry. On 11 February, Rossinelli performed "In Love for a While" during the final of the Azerbaijani Eurovision national final Milli Seçim Turu 2011. On 14 April, Rossinelli performed during the Eurovision in Concert event which was held at the Club Air venue in Amsterdam, Netherlands and hosted by Cornald Maas, Esther Hart and Sascha Korf. On 17 April, Rossinelli performed during the London Eurovision Party, which was held at the Shadow Lounge venue in London, United Kingdom and hosted by Nicki French and Paddy O'Connell.

== At Eurovision ==
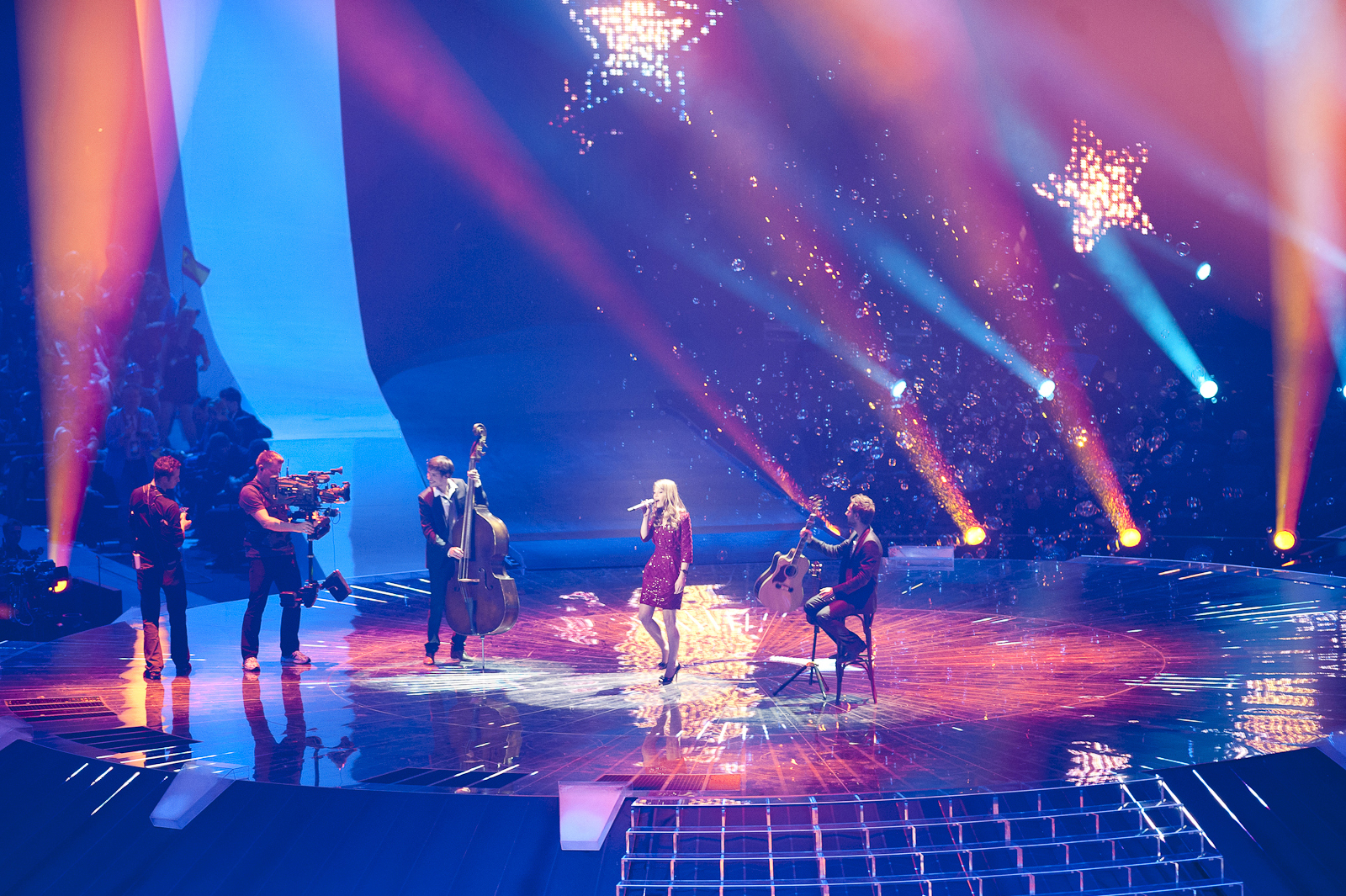
Anna Rossinelli performing at the Eurovision Song Contest

According to Eurovision rules, all nations with the exceptions of the host country and the "Big Five" (France, Germany, Italy, Spain and the United Kingdom) are required to qualify from one of two semi-finals in order to compete for the final; the top ten countries from each semi-final progress to the final. The European Broadcasting Union (EBU) split up the competing countries into six different pots based on voting patterns from previous contests, with countries with favourable voting histories put into the same pot. On 17 January 2011, a special allocation draw was held which placed each country into one of the two semi-finals, as well as which half of the show they would perform in. Switzerland was placed into the first semi-final, to be held on 10 May 2011, and was scheduled to perform in the first half of the show. The running order for the semi-finals was decided through another draw on 15 March 2011 and Switzerland was set to perform in position 8, following the entry from Russia and before the entry from Georgia.

In Switzerland, three broadcasters that form SRG SSR aired the contest. Sven Epiney provided German commentary for the first semi-final and the final airing on SRF zwei. Jean-Marc Richard provided French commentary on TSR 2 together with Henri Dès for the first semi-final and Nicolas Tanner for the final. Jonathan Tedesco provided Italian commentary for the semi-finals on RSI La 2 and the final on RSI La 1. The Swiss spokesperson, who announced the Swiss votes during the final, was Cécile Bähler.

=== Semi-final ===
Anna Rossinelli took part in technical rehearsals on 1 and 5 May, followed by dress rehearsals on 9 and 10 May. This included the jury show on 9 May where the professional juries of each country watched and voted on the competing entries.

The Swiss performance featured Anna Rossinelli performing on stage in a sparkly mid length dark red dress together with a double bassist and a guitarist who also played the banjo at the beginning of the performance. The LED screens displayed multicoloured clouds shapes and stars in amongst bright yellow and orange sun rays, and the performance featured bubbles being blown on stage from the back. The double bassist and guitarist/banjo player that joined Anna Rossinelli were Manuel Meisel and Georg Dillier, respectively.

At the end of the show, Switzerland was announced as having finished in the top 10 and subsequently qualifying for the grand final. This marked the second time Switzerland managed to qualify to the final, which they achieved after six years since their last qualification in 2005 (and final appearance in 2006). It was later revealed that Switzerland placed tenth in the semi-final, receiving a total of 55 points.

=== Final ===
Shortly after the first semi-final, a winners' press conference was held for the ten qualifying countries. As part of this press conference, the qualifying artists took part in a draw to determine the running order for the final. This draw was done in the order the countries were announced during the semi-final. Switzerland was drawn to perform in position 13, following the entry from Italy and before the entry from the United Kingdom.

Anna Rossinelli once again took part in dress rehearsals on 13 and 14 May before the final, including the jury final where the professional juries cast their final votes before the live show. Rossinelli performed a repeat of her semi-final performance during the final on 14 May. Switzerland placed twenty-fifth (last) in the final, scoring 19 points.

=== Voting ===
Voting during the three shows consisted of 50 percent public televoting and 50 percent from a jury deliberation. The jury consisted of five music industry professionals who were citizens of the country they represent. This jury was asked to judge each contestant based on: vocal capacity; the stage performance; the song's composition and originality; and the overall impression by the act. In addition, no member of a national jury could be related in any way to any of the competing acts in such a way that they cannot vote impartially and independently.

Following the release of the full split voting by the EBU after the conclusion of the competition, it was revealed that Switzerland had placed twenty-fifth (last) with the public televote and twenty-third with the jury vote in the final. In the public vote, Switzerland scored 2 points, while with the jury vote, Switzerland scored 53 points. In the first semi-final, Switzerland placed twelfth with the public televote with 45 points and seventh with the jury vote, scoring 76 points.

Below is a breakdown of points awarded to Switzerland and awarded by Switzerland in the first semi-final and grand final of the contest. The nation awarded its 12 points to Serbia in the semi-final and to Bosnia and Herzegovina in the final of the contest.

==== Points awarded to Switzerland ====
Points awarded to Switzerland (Semi-final 1)
Score	Country
12 points	
10 points	
8 points	Hungary
7 points	
6 points	Finland; Iceland; Lithuania; Norway; Spain
5 points	Portugal
4 points	
3 points	Armenia; Poland
2 points	Croatia; Serbia; United Kingdom
1 point	

Points awarded to Switzerland (Final)
Score	Country
12 points	
10 points	United Kingdom
8 points	
7 points	
6 points	
5 points	Serbia
4 points	Slovakia
3 points	
2 points	
1 point	

==== Points awarded by Switzerland ====
Points awarded by Switzerland (Semi-final 1)
Score	Country
12 points	Serbia
10 points	Finland
8 points	Iceland
7 points	Greece
6 points	Albania
5 points	Turkey
4 points	Portugal
3 points	Lithuania
2 points	Norway
1 point	Azerbaijan

Points awarded by Switzerland (Final)
Score	Country
12 points	Bosnia and Herzegovina
10 points	Iceland
8 points	Germany
7 points	Austria
6 points	Serbia
5 points	Finland
4 points	Italy
3 points	Spain
2 points	Greece
1 point	Azerbaijan
