= The Bastardz =

Croatian funk band

- Origin: Zagreb, Croatia Amsterdam, The Netherlands
- Genres: jazz, funk soul, pop
- Years active: 1990–present
- Labels: Aquarius Records, CBS, Croatia Records, 2 fonkee, Memphis
- Members: Jex Zoran Jaeger; Gojko Tomljanović; Alen Svetopetrić; Damir Šomen; Tasha Nataša Petrić; Ivica Premelč; Mario Huljev
- Past members: Helena Bastić; Dubravko Vorih; Siniša Banović; Saša Nestorović; Krunoslav Levačić; Davor Križić; Srđan Dedić; Goran Delač; Borna Šercar; Igor Šega; Zdravko Tabain; Irina Jambrošić; Davor Ivelić; Hrvoje Štefotić - Štef; Dražen Scholz; Kristijan Zebić
- Website: www.thebastardz.com

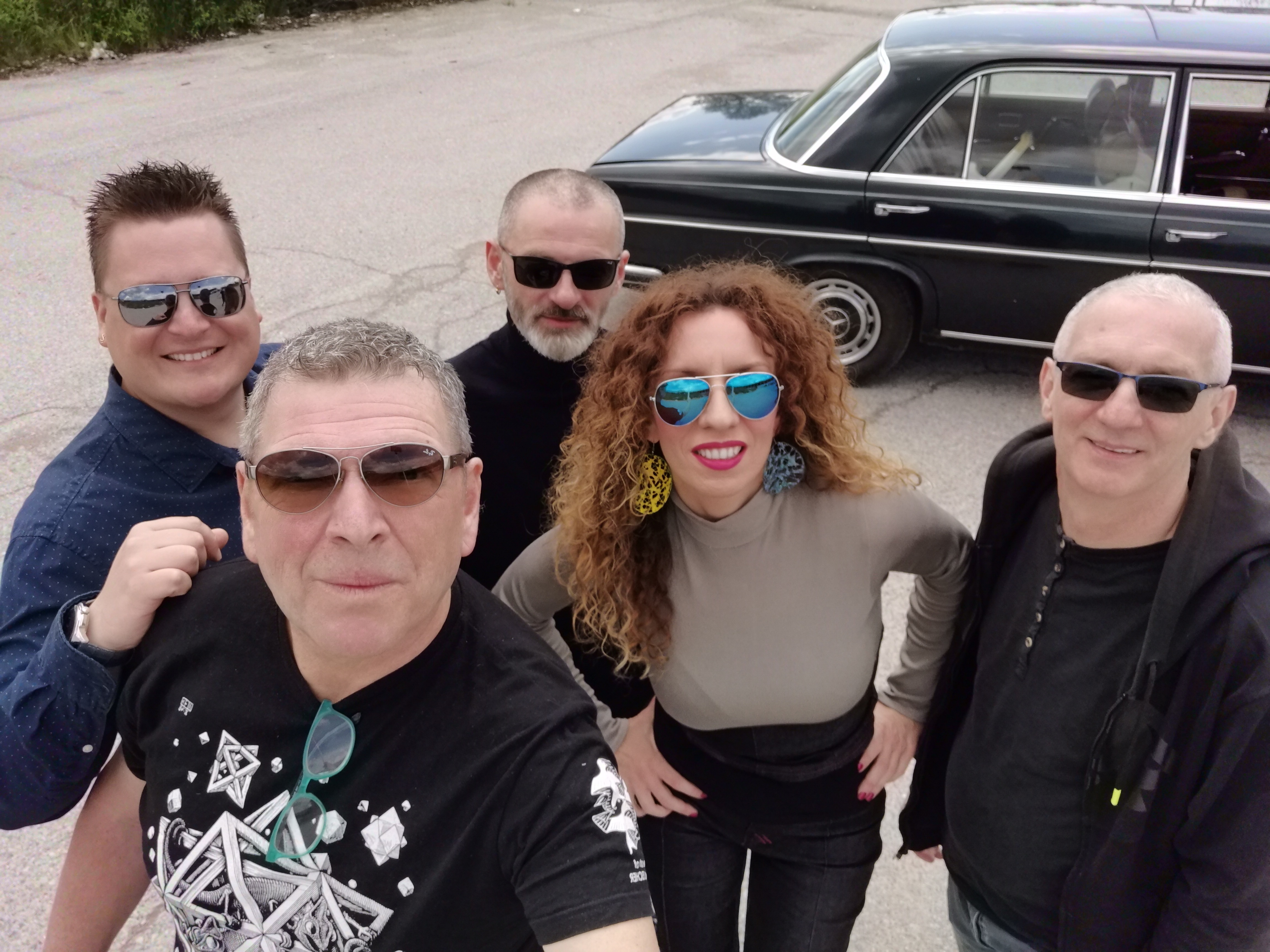
The Bastardz during the video shoot for Dance with me

The Bastardz are a Croatian funk based band with a lot of pop and jazz influences, founded in 1990 by guitarist and songwriter Jex Zoran Jaeger. In 1995, they released their first music release, a mini LP titled "Your Love". The song "Tvoja Ljubav" quickly topped the charts in Croatia. It also started the whole urban music movement united under the record label Aquarius Records. They have won several national music awards. Due to the fact that Jex resided in Croatia and in The Netherlands, The Bastardz were active as a band there, too. Apart from leading The Bastardz, Jex was a long time guitarist for several Dutch funk, acid jazz oriented bands like Saskia Laroo Band, Saxual Harassment, Traffic Jam and many others.

The Bastardz are well known for their collaborations with other soul/funk/jazz musicians from all over the world, including the legendary "Mr. Defunkt" Joseph Bowie, leader of the band DEFUNKT from New York.

== History ==
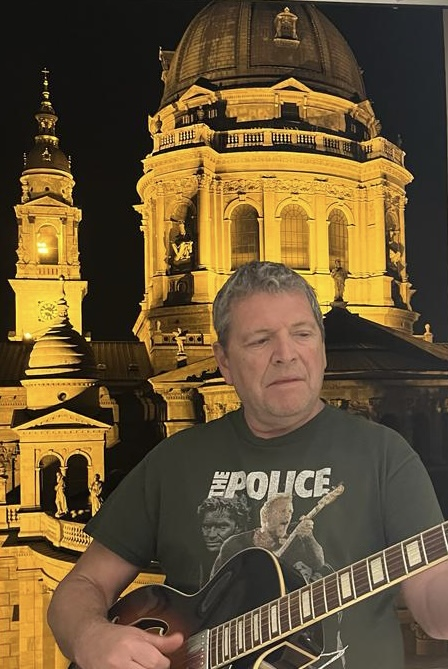
The Bastardz, Jex in Budapest

The band was established in 1990, with the original lineup featuring Zoran Jaeger Jex on electric guitar, Zvonimir Bučević on bass guitar, Goran Markić on drums, Alan Bjelinski on keyboards, and Miha Hawlina on tenor saxophone. They performed at local clubs in Zagreb and were the "house band" on the TV show Top-Cup. In addition to their original songs, they also recorded popular hits in the funk style and had regular Thursday performances at the club "Saloon", top spot in Zagreb, Croatia. The band initially disbanded in 1991 but reunited in the summer of 1995 with a new lineup consisting of Helena Bastić on vocals, Zvonimir Bučević - Buč on bass guitar, Zoran Jaeger - Jex on guitar, Kruno Levačić on drums, and Gojko Tomljanović on keyboards. In the same year, they released a mini-LP titled Your Love, featuring their own material, with the song "Tvoja ljubav" standing out as a major hit. The song quickly gained traction on radio and TV, eventually reaching the top of the Croatian charts. In 1996, they received the Porin discography award in the category of debutant of the year. Subsequently, due to a variety of circumstances, the lineup ceased to work together.

Following 1996, Lady Miss Helena (Helena Bastić) and guitarist/composer Jex (Zoran Jaeger) became the core of the band, collaborating with various prominent Croatian and international musicians. They released multiple studio albums and won three Porin discography awards (debutants of the year, 1996, best instrumental performance, and best album of urban club music). Their first album introduced a new sound to the Croatian music scene, leading to the establishment of the specialized record company, Aquarius Records. They also played a significant role in the inception of the 'Lagano, lagano' festival. The band has been regular performers at various jazz festivals and concerts both domestically and internationally. To date, they have produced ten Top 10 hits, an equal number of music videos, multiple studio albums, a compilation, and a live album. Apart from leading The Bastardz, Jex performs with several successful Dutch jazz/acid jazz groups. In 2006, Helena Bastić departed from The Bastardz, following which the band collaborated with vocalist Danijela Pintarić for a brief period, sometimes performing together with the Croatian funk legend Dino Dvornik. In 2008, Tasha (Natasha Petrić) joined the band as a vocal soloist, with whom, alongside numerous guest artists, they released their sixth album, titled The Bastardz 6, in late 2010 through IDM Music. Since 2009, The Bastardz have extensively collaborated with the legendary figure in the world funk and jazz funk scene, trombonist Joseph Bowie, founder of the cult group Defunkt from New York. Apart from several tours and numerous concerts featuring "Mr. Defunkt" Joseph Bowie & The Bastardz, the joint single "Knock, knock" was included on The Bastardz 6 album, with plans for a full-length collaborative project in the works. In 2016, the single "Angels" was released, featuring vocal soloist Daria Hodnik Marinković, while in 2017, they partnered with Željko Banić and the Songkillers group for the track "Pola meni, pola tebi". Alongside the original version, there is also a rendition performed by The Bastardz & Songkillers featuring Radiofonik and a remix by Davor Devčić titled "Pola meni, pola tebi" by D 3 Rework. October 2020 saw the release of the single "Što je svijet bez ljubavi (What's the world without love)" by The Bastardz feat. Mario Huljev, announcing the launch of a compilation album marking the group's 30th anniversary and the 25th anniversary of their inaugural record release. In 2021, the single "Dance with me" was released. Then, in February 2022, they released the single "Sve je lako kad si gad" with Davor Gobac as the lead vocalist, followed by the EP "Dance with me" in June, which not only includes the title track in two vocal and one instrumental versions, but also features a remix of the song "Angels" by Oleg Colnago. February 2023 witnessed the release of the single "Mama Funky" showcasing Zdenka Kovačiček as the lead vocalist, accompanied by a music video directed by Radislav Jovanov Gonzo.

== Discography ==
=== Albums ===
- 1995. - Your love (Aquarius Records, EP)
- 1996. - C’est Universal (Croatia Records)
- 1998. - The Groove Resistance (Croatia Records)
- 2000. - Muzika Ljubavi (Croatia Records)
- 2003. - Chronological (Memphis)
- 2003. - The Bastardz Go Jazzy Live (Memphis)
- 2010. - The Bastardz 6 (IDM)
- 2020. - The Bastardz 30 (Aquarius records)

=== Singles ===
- 2016. - Anđeli featuring Daria Hodnik Marinković (Aquarius records)
- 2017. - Pola meni, pola tebi featuring Songkillers & Radiofonik (Aquarius records)
- 2017. - Pola meni, pola tebi D 3 Rework
- 2020. - Što je svijet bez ljubavi featuring Mario Huljev (Aquarius records/SIPA music)
- 2021. - Pleši sa mnom (Aquarius records)
- 2022. - Sve je lako kad si gad featuring Davor Gobac (Aquarius records)
- 2022. - Dance with me EP (Aquarius records)
- 2023. - Funky Mama featuring Zdenka Kovačiček (Aquarius records)
- 2024. - Love around the world/Ljubav za sve nas featuring Mario Huljev (Aquarius records)
- 2024. - Sax around the world featuring Ywek
- 2024. - Budala (Aquarius records)
- 2025. - Tvoja Ljubav remake - Eni Jurišić
- 2026. - Močvara featuring RAMBO AMADEUS (Aquarius records)
