= Change (Hotel FM song) =

2011 song by Hotel FM

Single by Hotel FM
- Released: 2011
- Genre: Pop
- Length: 3:04
- Label: TVR
- Songwriters: Alexandra Ivan; Gabriel Băruță
- Producer: Băruță

Eurovision Song Contest 2011 entry
- Country: Romania
- Artists: Gabriel Băruţă; David Bryan; Alex Szűz
- As: Hotel FM
- Languages: English
- Composer: Gabriel Băruţă
- Lyricists: Băruță; Alexandra Ivan

Finals performance
- Semi-final result: 4th
- Semi-final points: 111
- Final result: 17th
- Final points: 77

Entry chronology
- ◄ "Playing with Fire" (2010)
- "Zaleilah" (2012) ►

"Change" is a song recorded by Romanian group Hotel FM, released as a CD single in 2011 by Romanian Television (TVR). It was written by Alexandra Ivan and Gabriel Băruţă, while production was solely handled by the latter. An uptempo pop ballad containing drums, piano and violins in its instrumentation, the lyrics talk about making a positive change in the world and one's life. A reviewer compared "Change" to the music of English group Take That and singer Sean Maguire.

The track represented Romania in the Eurovision Song Contest 2011 after winning the pre-selection show Selecția Națională. Hotel FM eventually came 17th in the contest's Grand Final, gathering a total of 77 points. During their performance, the group was joined by two female background dancers, while the LED screen showed pulsating circles and ovals. Music critics gave mixed reviews of "Change", praising its instrumentation, but criticising the song as "unspectacular" and "cheesy". The track was promoted by endeavours in several European countries, as well as by the release of an accompanying music video produced by TVR and Schneider Production. Uploaded onto YouTube on 18 March 2011, the visual features shots of various Romanian tourist attractions.

== Background and composition ==
Hotel FM is a Romanian group consisting of British expatriate David Bryan, who provides lead vocals, as well as of Gabriel Băruţă on piano and Alex Szűz on drums. Their song "Change" was written by Alexandra Ivan and Băruţă, while production was solely handled by the latter. It was composed in November 2010 after Băruţa came up with a melody one morning and played it on the piano. He also wrote the beginnings of the song's chorus. According to Bryan, he asked what the verses should discuss on, to which Băruţa responded: "Well, you have time... figure something out!"; Bryan came up with the line: "You think you’ve got the time to figure it out" and the rest of "Change" was written in a "very natural flow" in about 30 minutes. An enhanced CD of the song was released in Romania in 2011 by Romanian Television (TVR), containing "Change", its instrumental version and music video, along with the tracks "The Gathering" and "Come as One". The latter served as Hotel FM's entry for the 2010 Romanian national selection for the Eurovision Song Contest. The CD contains images photographed by Ioana Chiriță, Aurel Baboi and Edy Schneider, while graphic design and editing were handled by Bristenea Marin and Mariana Rusen, respectively.

A "tranquil" and "romantic" uptempo pop ballad, the instrumentation of "Change" lacks electronic effects and consists of "natural" instruments such as drums, piano and violins. Stuart Heritage of The Guardian likened the track to "Shine" (2007) by Take That and "Today's the Day" (1997) by Sean Maguire, whereas Băruţă said the song had a British sound. During the track's lyrics, Bryan states that he "can't change the world alone" and that "a smile can change it all". The singer elaborated on the message of "Change" in an interview with Wiwibloggs: "The title itself says it all. We are always hearing that we have our whole life in front of us and then we wake up to see that we accomplished nothing during our lives. So, our message to Europe is: Stop dreaming of it, take a step that's gonna make a difference and change your world."

== Reception ==
"Change" was one of the favourites to win the Eurovision Song Contest 2011 in betting odds. An author of PureMédias gave a positive review of the song, writing: "Rhythmed and lively, the Romanians interpret a seductive title". Marc Gehring of German website Prinz.de described "Change" as "nice but unspectacular mainstream". In a 2016 poll on Wiwibloggs called "What is your favourite Eurovision song from Romania?", the track finished in 11th place with over 100 votes. Commercially, "Change" received minor airplay on Romanian radio and television stations.

== Promotion ==
Hotel FM began their promotion tour for "Change" in Bulgaria on 23 February 2011, performing as a guest on the country's national selection for Eurovision, held at the National Palace of Culture in Sofia. The performance involved technical issues with Bryan's microphone and headset. During the next day, the group gave an interview on BNT 1's morning show with Bulgarian Eurovision entrant Poli Genova, which was later also aired on Radio Bulgaria (BNR). On 25 February 2011, Hotel FM continued their tour in Chișinău, Moldova for television appearances on Noroc TV, Jurnal TV, Moldova 1 and Muz TV, as well as for a radio interview on Radio Moldova. The next day, the group performed "Change" at the final of the Moldovan Eurovision preselection, O melodie pentru Europa. Their promotion tour on European television and radio stations continued in Athens, Greece, Rome, Italy, Budapest, Hungary, Brussels, Belgium and London, United Kingdom from April to May 2011.

For further promotion, an accompanying music video for "Change" was uploaded onto the official YouTube channel of the Eurovision Song Contest on 18 March 2011. It was shot in February 2011 and produced by Romanian Television and Schneider Production, containing footage of several Romanian tourist attractions including the Bran Castle in Brașov, an ice hotel and church at Bâlea Lake in Cârțișoara, Salina Turda, and Bran-Moieciu. The clip was meant to promote the tourism in Romania. Initially, it was planned to shoot scenes at Babele in the Southern Carpathians, but plans were scrapped after the aerial tramway there was out of function due to bad weather. On 14 March 2011, the music video was sent to several European television channels.

== At Eurovision ==
=== National selection ===
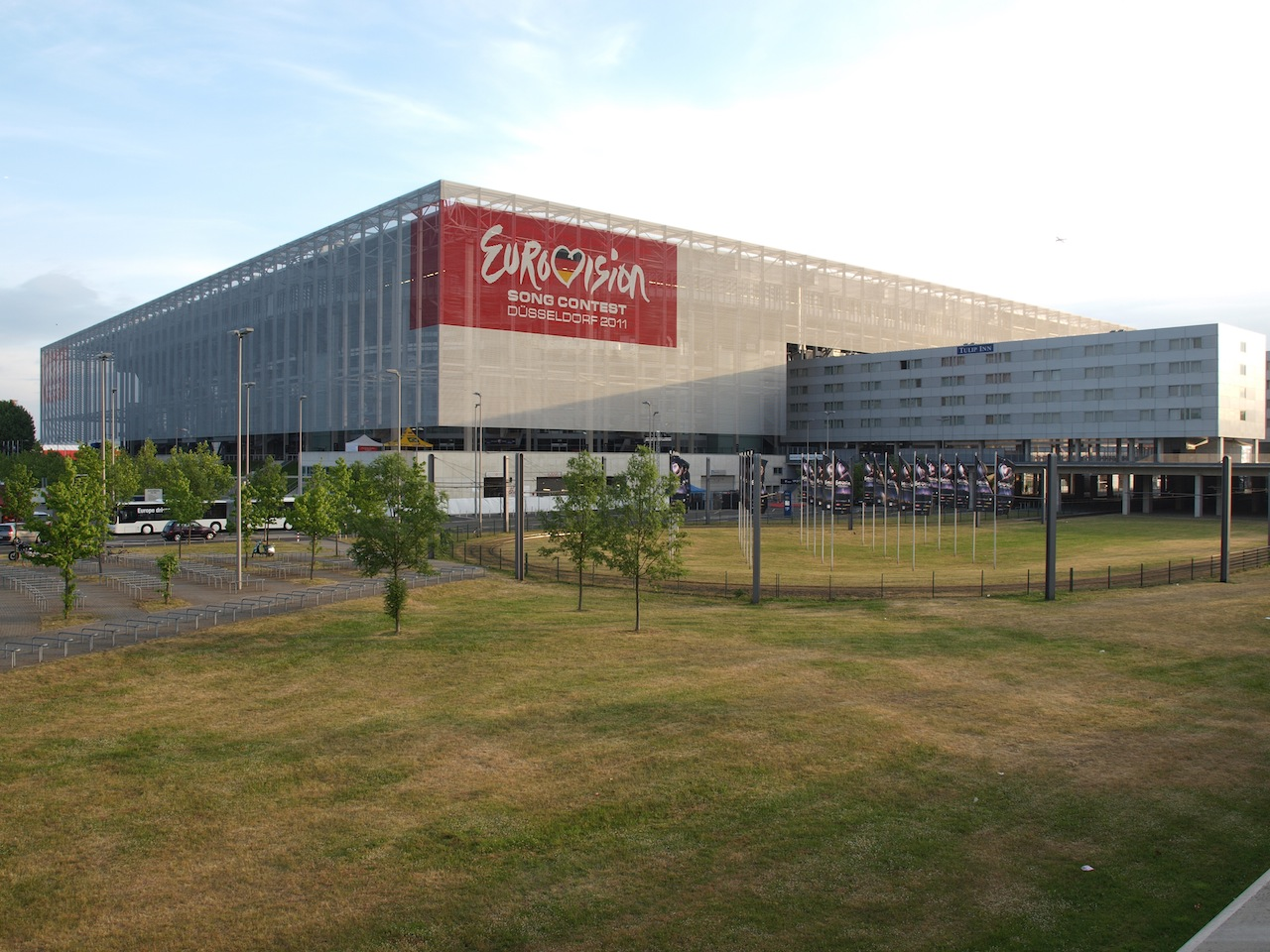
Hotel FM performed at the Esprit Arena in Germany during the Eurovision Song Contest 2011.

On 31 December 2010, the Selecția Națională was held in order to select the Romanian entrant for the Eurovision Song Contest. Subsequently, "Change" was chosen to represent Romania at the contest after the votes of a professional jury panel (12 points) and public televoting (ten points) were combined, resulting in 22 points.

=== In Düsseldorf ===
The Eurovision Song Contest 2011 took place at the Esprit Arena in Düsseldorf, Germany and consisted of two semi-finals on 10 and 12 May, and the final on 14 May 2011. According to the Eurovision rules, all participating countries, except the host country and the "Big Five" (France, Germany, Italy, Spain, and the United Kingdom), were required to qualify from one semi-final to compete for the final; the top ten countries from the respective semi-final progressed to the final. Hotel FM sang 14th in the second semi-final following Slovenia and preceding Estonia, while they performed 17th in the Grand Final following Germany and preceding Austria.

Romania's total budget for their Eurovision appearance amounted to €500,000. Their performance used a remastered version of "Change", which Hotel FM elaborated on: "We weren't satisfied with the initial version, as it was made very fast. Now, the song sounds way better and is more dynamic and conveying". All three band members were featured onstage during their show, along with two female background dancers wearing black suits and hats involved in a dance routine with trumpets. The background LED screen displayed flashing circles and ovals, "fitting the energetic song and performance well, just like the flickering lights on the stage floor". The Guardian likened Bryan's appearance to British singer Cliff Richard and negatively commented on his outfit: "He wants to change the world, but he can't do it alone. Start small, David – change the trousers. Then the waistcoat."

==== Points awarded to Romania ====
Below is a breakdown of points awarded to Romania in the second semi-final and Grand Final of the contest. On the first occasion, the country finished in fourth place with a total of 111 points, including 12 from Italy and Moldova, 10 from Belgium, and 8 from Cyprus and France. In the Grand Final of the Eurovision Song Contest, Romania finished in 17th position, gathering a total of 77 points, including 12 awarded by Moldova and Italy, 10 by Belgium and 8 by Spain.

Points awarded to Romania (Semi-final 2)
Score	Country
12 points	Italy; Moldova
10 points	Belgium
8 points	Cyprus; France
7 points	Israel; Sweden
6 points	Austria; Denmark; Estonia; Germany; Slovakia
5 points	Latvia
4 points	Macedonia; Netherlands
3 points	Ireland
2 points	
1 point	Bulgaria

Points awarded to Romania (Final)
Score	Country
12 points	Italy; Moldova
10 points	Belgium
8 points	Spain
7 points	
6 points	Azerbaijan; Bulgaria; Israel
5 points	Turkey
4 points	Denmark; Netherlands
3 points	
2 points	
1 point	Austria; Estonia; Hungary; Ireland

== Track listing ==
- Romanian enhanced CD (Note: The lengths of the different tracks on the enhanced CD were not revealed.)
1. "Change"
2. "Change" (Instrumental)
3. "Come as One"
4. "The Gathering"
5. "Change" (Music video)

== Release history ==
Country	Date	Format	Label
Romania	2011	Enhanced CD	TVR
