= Seventeen (Iris album) =

Studio album by Iris
- Released: 26 April 2012
- Recorded: 2011
- Genre: Pop
- Label: SonicAngel

Singles from Seventeen
- 1. "Wonderful" Released: 18 November 2011; 2. "Would You?" Released: 18 March 2012; 3. "Welcome to My World" Released: 19 June 2012

Seventeen is the debut studio album by Belgian female singer Iris. It was released in Belgium on 26 April 2012. The album has reached number 30 in Belgium. The album includes the singles "Wonderful" and "Would You?".

== Singles ==
- "Wonderful" was the first single to be released from the album on 18 November 2011, the single peaked at number 28 in Belgium.
- "Would You?" was the second single released from the album on 18 March 2012. She will sing the song at the Eurovision Song Contest 2012 for Belgium. It has reached number 19 in Belgium.
- "Welcome to My World" was the third single released from the album on 19 June 2012.

== Track listing ==
No.	Title	Length
1.	"Safety Net"	2:59
2.	"I Know"	2:56
3.	"Gone" (feat. Dean)	3:38
4.	"17"	3:09
5.	"24/7"	3:34
6.	"My Lucky Day"	3:01
7.	"Girlfriend"	2:50
8.	"Welcome to My World"	3:23
9.	"Fly Away"	3:38
10.	"Wonderful"	3:03
11.	"Would You?"	2:59

== Chart performance ==
Chart (2012)	Peak position
Belgian Albums Chart (Flanders)	30

== Release history ==
Country	Date	Format	Label
Belgium	26 April 2012	Digital download	SonicAngel
