= RoxorLoops =

Belgian beatboxer

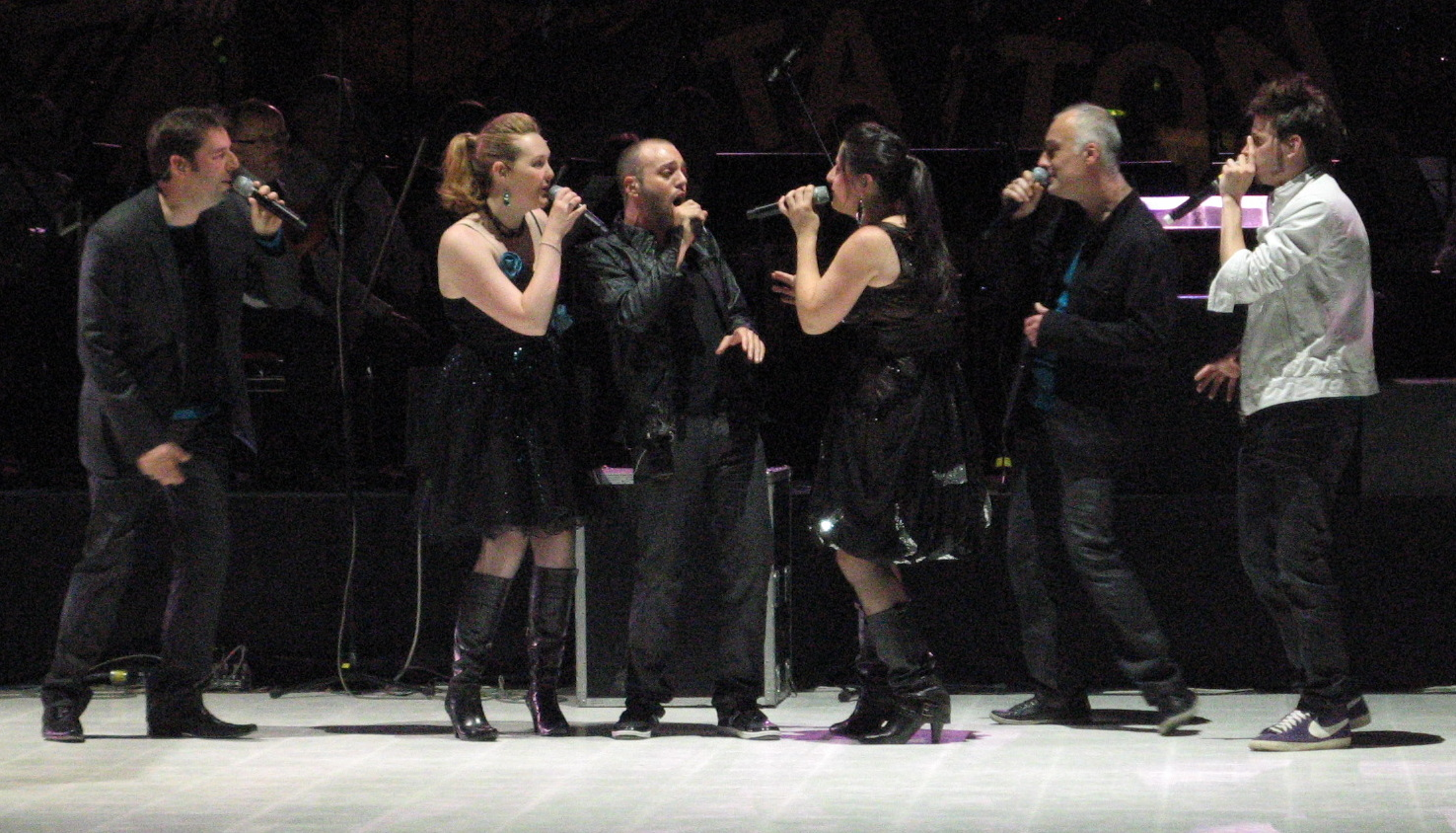
- RoxorLoops (right) in 2011 as part of Witloof Bay at a concert in Turku, Finland.

Background information
- Also known as: RoxorLoops
- Born: Senjka Danhieux; 28 April 1984 (age 42); Jette, Belgium
- Occupations: Beatboxer, songwriter
- Years active: 2004–present
- Formerly of: Witloof Bay

Senjka Danhieux (born 28 April 1984), better known under his stage name RoxorLoops, is a Belgian beatboxer and songwriter. He currently lives in Denmark, where he studied vocal leading and singing at the Royal Academy of Music in Aalborg.

== Career ==
=== Early career ===
In 2004, Danhieux won the Belgian Beatboxing Championship. One year later, he competed in the Beatbox Battle World Championship, in which he won second place. In 2006, he was a part of the group Beatoxic, which performed the song "Feel Like" in the second heat of Eurosong '06, the Belgian national selection for the Eurovision Song Contest 2006, but failed to qualify for the semi-finals.

=== Eurovision Song Contest 2011 ===
In 2011, he participated in the Belgian national selection Eurovision 2011: Qui? A vous de choisir, this time as part of the a cappella group Witloof Bay with the song "With Love Baby" (co-written by Danhieux). The group went on to win the competition and were given the right to represent Belgium in the Eurovision Song Contest 2011 held in Düsseldorf, Germany. The entry did not qualify for the final, finishing in eleventh place in the second semi-final.

=== Dansk Melodi Grand Prix 2020 ===
In 2020, Danhieux was selected by the Danish broadcaster DR to compete in Dansk Melodi Grand Prix, Denmark’s national selection for the Eurovision Song Contest. Together with his girlfriend Jasmin Rose, he performed the song "Human" (co-written by Lise Cabble) in the final on 7 March 2020, but ultimately failed to advance to the superfinal.

== Discography ==
=== As part of Witloof Bay ===
| Title | Year | Peak chart positions | | Album |
| Title | Year | BEL (Fla) | BEL (Wal) | Album |
|---|---|---|---|---|
| "With Love Baby" | 2011 | 42 | 50 | Non-album singles |

=== As featured artist ===
| Title | Year | Album |
|---|---|---|
| "Human" (Jasmin Rose feat. RoxorLoops) | 2020 | Dansk Melodi Grand Prix 2020 |

| Preceded by Tom Dice with "Me and My Guitar" | Belgium in the Eurovision Song Contest (as part of Witloof Bay); 2011 | Succeeded by Iris with "Would You?" |
