= The Voice of Vietnam season 6 =

Season of television series

The Voice of Vietnam
- Season 6
- Hosted by: Phí Linh; Ali Hoàng Dương (backstage)
- Judges: Hồ Hoài Anh; Thanh Hà; Tuấn Ngọc; Tuấn Hưng
- Winner: Hoàng Đức Thịnh
- Winning coach: Tuấn Ngọc
- Runner-up: Lâm Bảo Ngọc

Release
- Original network: VTV3
- Original release: April 14 – July 21, 2019

Season chronology
- ← Previous; Season 5

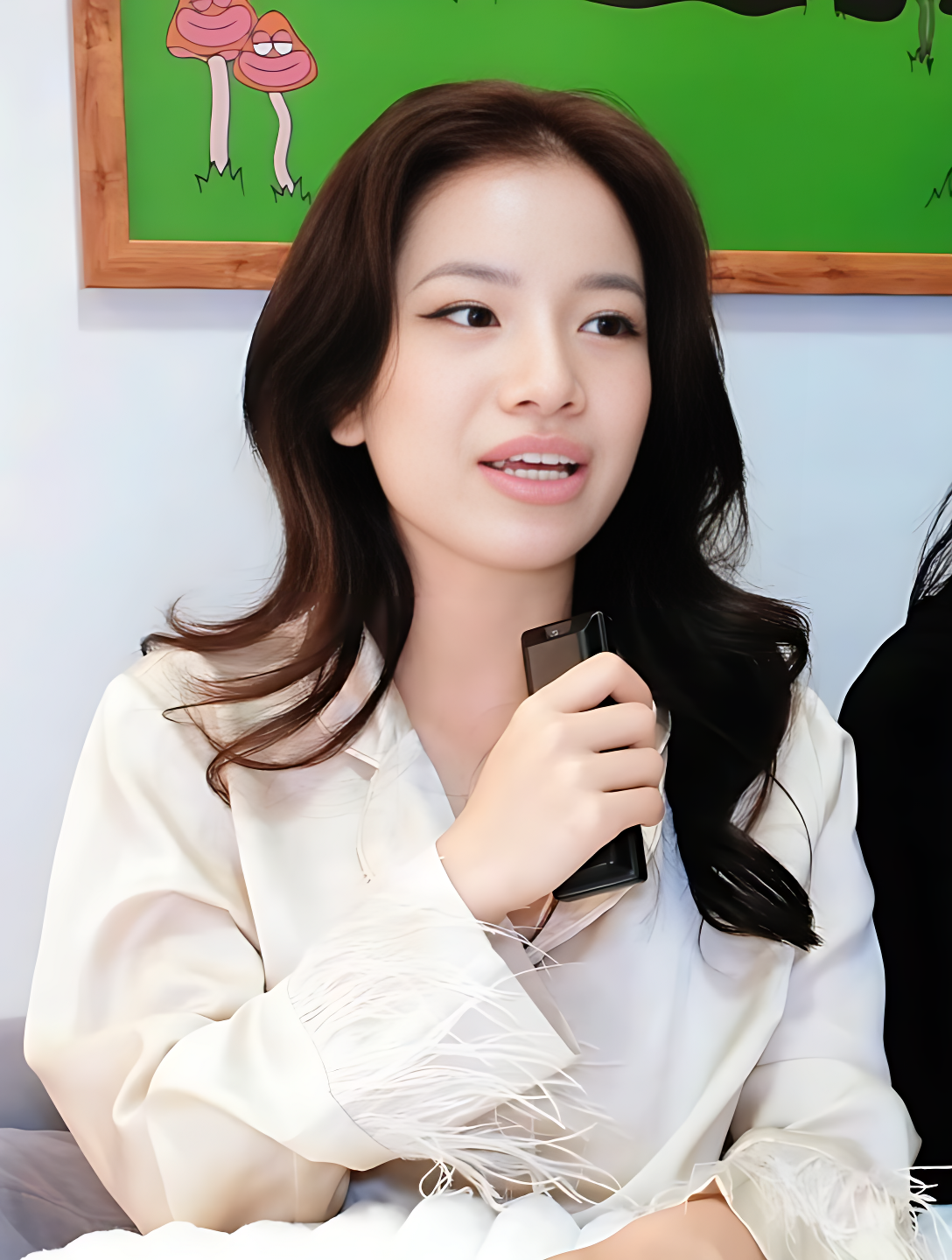
Lâm Bảo Ngọc, season six runner-up

The sixth season of The Voice of Vietnam, a Vietnamese reality television series, began on April 14, 2019. All four coaches from the previous season did not return, leaving the panel to be renewed with Hồ Hoài Anh, Thanh Hà, Tuấn Ngọc and Tuấn Hưng.

This season was won by Hoàng Đức Thịnh from team Tuấn Ngọc.

== Coaches and hosts ==
The Voice of Vietnam season 6 coaches

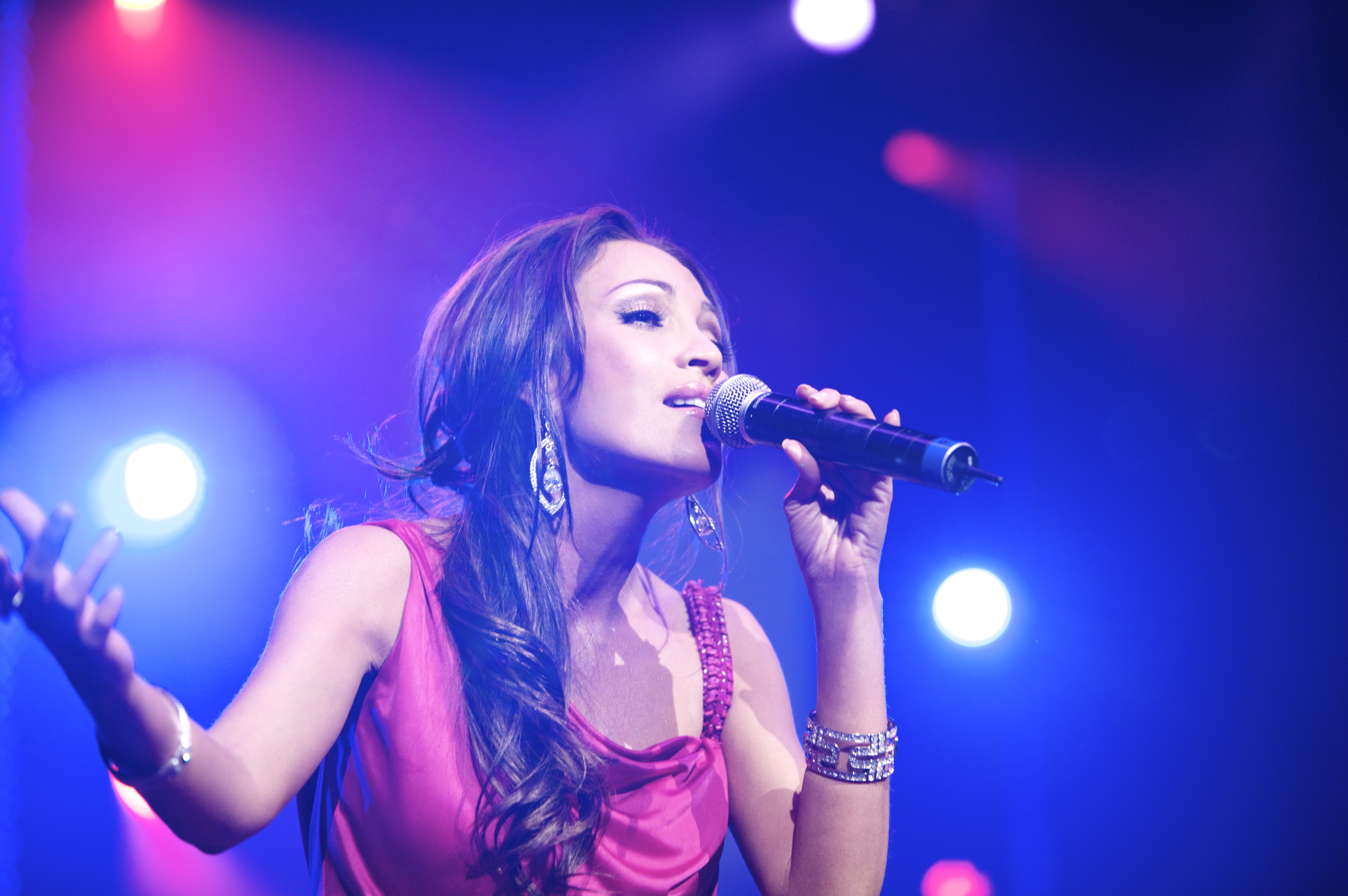
Thanh Hà

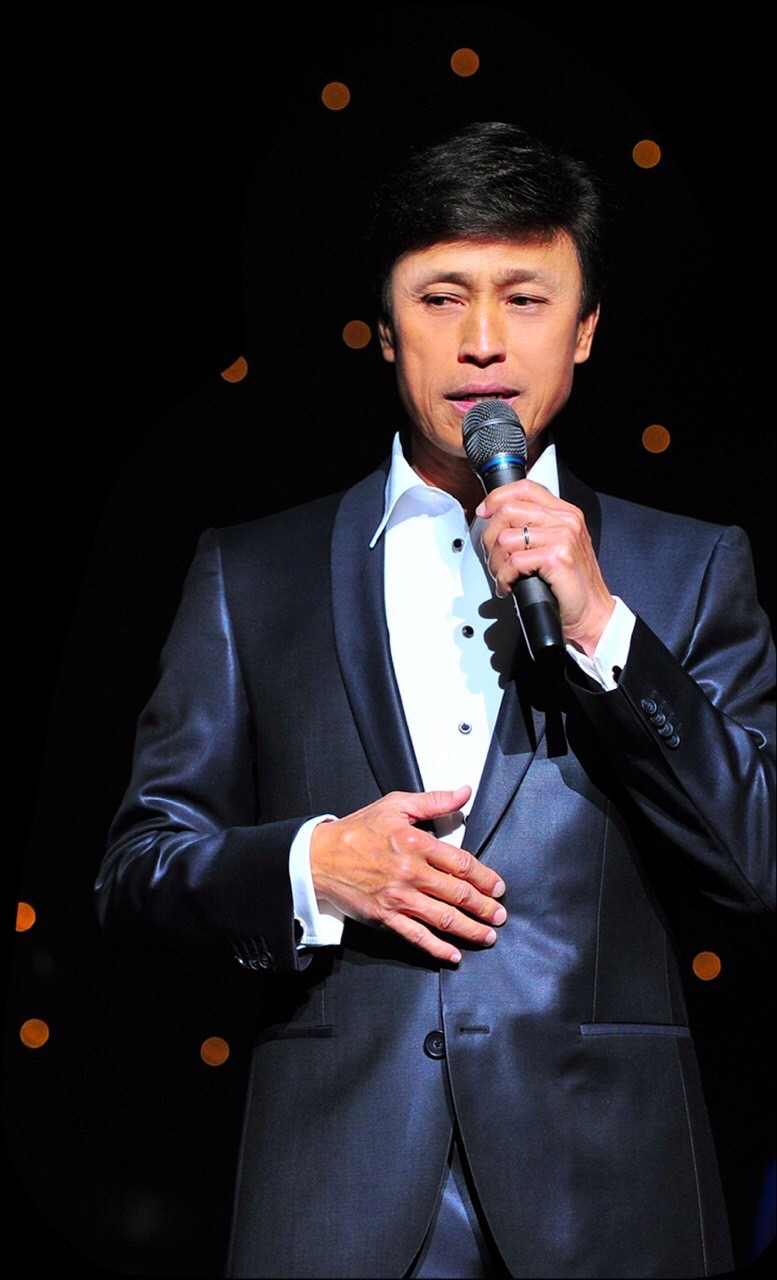
Tuấn Ngọc

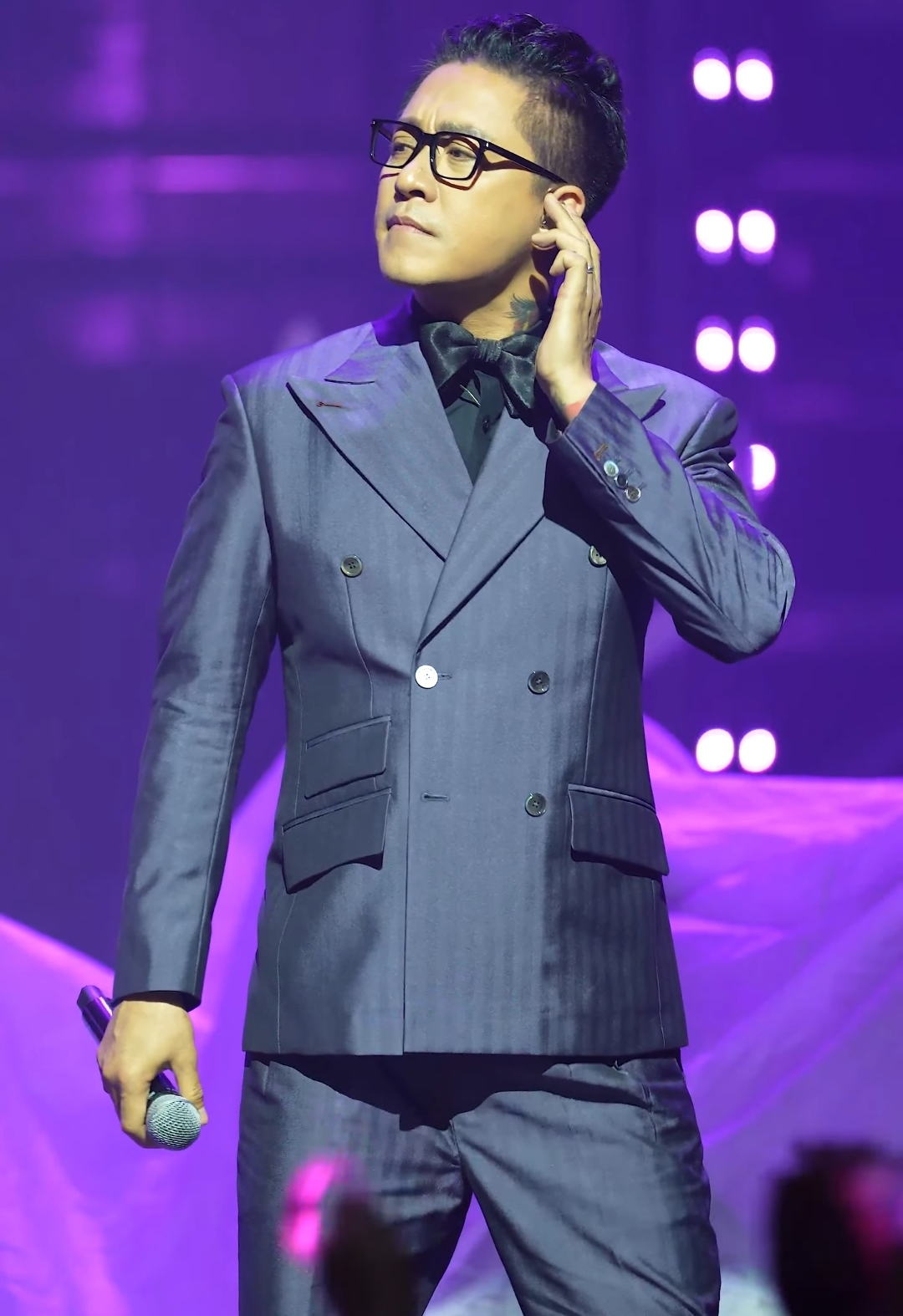
Tuấn Hưng

On 12 March 2019, it was confirmed that season 3 coach Tuấn Hưng would be returning to his red chair for the series' sixth season, after a four-year hiatus. The following day, it was announced that The Voice Kids coach Hồ Hoài Anh, singers Tuấn Ngọc and Thanh Hà would join the coaching panel for season six. Therefore, this season has the oldest panel in the show's history, with the youngest judge (Hồ Hoài Anh) is 40 and Tuấn Ngọc is 72 at this point of time.

Controversy arose after the jury was revealed, with some fans questioning if Tuấn Ngọc's age distance with young generation will make it difficult for him in connecting with his contestants or whether an old jury will cause a fall in ratings. On his appointment, Tuấn Ngọc stated, "I'm just afraid I can't help much for the contestants, and age is sometimes just a matter of numbers. Have been performing in the past few decades, I understand that any music is a musical note, it's musical aesthetics that important. The Voice UK's Sir Tom Jones is 78, am I already considered old?". Tuấn Hưng commented on his return to the show despite having confirmed to never coming back four years ago, "My finalist Yến Lê's post-show success inspired me, also my desire to refresh myself and once again get immersed in the music flow of young people is what made me return".

Two presenters from season 5, Phí Linh and Ali Hoàng Dương, both resumed their duties as hosts this season.

In a new twist, Hồ Hoài Anh would become the show's first-ever "special" coach, a role that shares similarities with the American version's Comeback Stage coach. The special coach has the chair staying towards the stage and has the right to choose unlimited contestants in the Blinds, but can only pick an artist if other coaches refrained; has separated Battle round rules and can save a number of artists in the Cross Battles.

Midway through the season, Tuấn Hưng announced he would not be returning to the show in future seasons.

== Teams ==
Color key

- Winner
- Runner-up
- Third place
- Fourth place
- Fifth place
- Eliminated in the Playoffs
- Eliminated but selected by the special coach in the Knockout rounds
- Eliminated in the Knockout rounds
- Stolen in the Battle rounds
- Eliminated in the Battle rounds

Coach	Top 45 Artists					
Hồ Hoài Anh						
Hồ Hoài Anh	Layla	Juky San	Phạm Thị Bảo Trân	Huỳnh Công Luận	Vũ Đức Thịnh	Nguyễn Cát Tiên
Hồ Hoài Anh	Nguyễn Khánh Linh	Nguyễn Tùng Hiếu	Hoàng Đình Quân	Nguyễn Thùy Dương	Đinh Nho Khoa	Zunni Hoàng Tùng Anh
Hồ Hoài Anh	Nguyễn Thị Trang	Trần Hà Thu	Mystery	S2	Nguyễn Cathy	
Thanh Hà						
Thanh Hà	**DOMINIX**	Trần Lê Bích Tuyết	Diêu Ngọc Bích Trâm	Trần Đức Trường	Nguyễn Châu Nhi	Bùi Tuấn Anh
Thanh Hà	~~Vũ Xuân Đạt~~	Đinh Bảo Yến	INNO	Nguyễn Hoài Vũ		
Tuấn Ngọc						
Tuấn Ngọc	Hoàng Đức Thịnh	Vũ Xuân Đạt	Văn Võ Ngọc Nhân	~~Layla~~	Vương Chí Bảo	Nguyễn Thảo Vân
Tuấn Ngọc	Phan Thị Huỳnh Giao	~~Trần Duy Đạt~~	Trần Hồng Liên	Nguyễn Trương Minh Nguyệt	Nguyễn Hoàng My	
Tuấn Hưng						
Tuấn Hưng	Lâm Bảo Ngọc	Trần Duy Đạt	Trần Hằng My	Ella Beth	Nguyễn Hoàng Bách	Hồng Hòa & Hồng Hiếu
Tuấn Hưng	Đỗ Hoài Nam	~~Nguyễn Cathy~~	David Bryan	Nguyễn Thanh Long	Nguyễn Hoàng Huy	
Note: Italicised names are stolen artists (names struck through within former teams). Bolded name is artist who received the Wildcard and advanced to the Semifinal.

== Blind auditions ==
The Blind auditions were taped on March 19 and 20; and were broadcast from April 14. With the exception of Hồ Hoài Anh, who serves as the "special" coach this season, the coaches have to fill their teams with 10 contestants each. The "Block" twist returned this season, one per coach. Also for the first time in the show's history, groups are allowed to enter the competition.

=== New rules ===
- Throughout the Blind audition course this season, instead of turning away from the stage as usual, Hồ Hoài Anh's chair will stay towards the stage during all performances, allowing him to know how the contestants look like. Hồ Hoài Anh will also has the ability to choose unlimited contestants unlike other coaches, and his selection button will still be valid even when the contestant has finished his/her performance. However, Hồ Hoài Anh will lose the opportunity to be picked if another coach also turn for the same artists, but also immune from the Block.
- This season, another twist was added in the Blind audition called "The Switch". If a coach has already filled his/her team with 10 members but interest in a contestant later, he/she can press the Switch button to swap that contestant with 1 of the 10 chosen artists. Each coach only has one Switch during the course of the Blind auditions.

Color key

Coach hit his or her "TÔI CHỌN BẠN" (I WANT YOU) button
Artist defaulted to a coach's team
Artist elected a coach's team
Artist was eliminated with no coach pressing their button
Coach pressed the "I WANT YOU" button, but was blocked by Thanh Hà from getting the artist
Coach pressed the "I WANT YOU" button, but was blocked by Tuấn Ngọc from getting the artist
Coach pressed the "I WANT YOU" button, but was blocked by Tuấn Hưng from getting the artist
Artist was originally selected, but was later switched with another artist and eliminated

=== Episode 1 (April 14) ===
Order	Artist	Age	Hometown	Song	Coaches and artists choices			
Order	Artist	Age	Hometown	Song	Hoài Anh	Thanh Hà	Tuấn Ngọc	Tuấn Hưng
1	Bùi Tuấn Anh	19	Ho Chi Minh City	"When I Was Your Man" by Bruno Mars			—	
2	Đinh Bảo Yến	24	Ho Chi Minh City	"Em ngày xưa khác rồi" by Hiền Hồ	—			
3	Đỗ Hoài Nam	33	Ho Chi Minh City	"Perfect" by Ed Sheeran		—	—	
4	Nguyễn Cát Tiên	—N/a	Yên Bái	"Buông tay"/"Dựa" by Lưu Thiên Hương		—	—	—
5	Nguyễn Thanh Long	20	Da Nang	"Góc ban công" by Vũ Cát Tường	—	—	—	
6	Hoàng Đức Thịnh	28	Hai Phong	"Cần lắm" by Hoàng Rapper	—	—		
7	Vũ Đức Thịnh	24	Hai Phong	"Em ơi" by Vũ Cát Tường		—	—	—
8	Nguyễn Khánh Linh	22	Hanoi	"I'm in Love" by Tóc Tiên		—	—	—
9	Trần Duy Đạt	24	Huế	"Năm ấy" by Đức Phúc				
10	Nguyễn Tùng Hiếu	21	Ho Chi Minh City	"Đừng xin lỗi nữa" by Min & Erik		—	—	—
11	Nguyễn Ngọc Lương	N/A	Hai Phong	"Lạc nhau có phải muôn đời" by Erik	—	—	—	—
12	Kiều Phan Quốc Lân	N/A	Ho Chi Minh City	"Flashlight" by Jessie J	—	—	—	—
13	DOMINIX	20-23	An Giang/ Gia Lai/ Ho Chi Minh City/ Thái Bình	"Một đêm say" by Thịnh Suy/ "Mượn rượu tỏ tình" by BigDaddy & Emily				

=== Episode 2 (April 21) ===
Order	Artist	Age	Hometown	Song	Coaches and artists choices			
Order	Artist	Age	Hometown	Song	Hoài Anh	Thanh Hà	Tuấn Ngọc	Tuấn Hưng
1	Layla	23	Hanoi	"Without Me" by Halsey				
2	INNO	—N/a	Hanoi/ Sơn La/ Hòa Bình	"Say tình by Đàm Vĩnh Hưng/ "Bùa yêu" by Bích Phương	—		—	—
3	Văn Võ Ngọc Nhân	22	Phú Yên	"Anh đang ở đâu đấy anh" by Hương Giang Idol	—	—		
4	Lê Minh Triết	N/A	N/A	"Là anh đó" by Andiez Nam Trương	—	—	—	—
5	Nguyễn Ngọc Long	N/A	N/A	"Lạ lùng" by Vũ	—	—	—	—
6	Phan Thị Huỳnh Giao	20	Bến Tre	"Shallow" by Lady Gaga & Bradley Cooper	—	—		—
7	David Bryan	34	United Kingdom	"Somebody to Love" by Queen				
8	Trần Hằng My	16	Hanoi	"Dangerous Woman" by Ariana Grande				
9	Phạm Thị Bảo Trân	25	Bình Dương	"New Rules" by Dua Lipa		—	—	—
10	Hoàng Đình Quân	26	Hanoi	"Ngày mai em đi" by Lê Hiếu		—	—	—
11	Nguyễn Hoài Vũ	28	Ho Chi Minh City	"Careless Whisper" by George Michael				
12	Nguyễn Thùy Dương	18	Hanoi	"Sao anh vẫn chờ" by Hương Tràm		—	—	—
13	Đinh Nho Khoa	20	Ho Chi Minh City	"The Sound of Silence" by Simon & Garfunkel		—	—	—
14	Diêu Ngọc Bích Trâm	19	Ho Chi Minh City	"I'll Never Love Again" by Lady Gaga				

=== Episode 3 (April 28) ===
Order	Artist	Age	Hometown	Song	Coaches and artists choices			
Order	Artist	Age	Hometown	Song	Hoài Anh	Thanh Hà	Tuấn Ngọc	Tuấn Hưng
1	Ella Beth	27	Hanoi	"Hương ngọc lan" by Mỹ Linh		—	—	
2	Nguyễn Tiến Việt	26	Hanoi	"Đã lỡ yêu em nhiều" by JustaTee	—	—	—	—
3	Nguyễn Hoàng My	—N/a	Đắk Lắk	"Sway" by Michael Bublé				
4	Nguyễn Hoàng Bách	22	Hà Nam	"Cơn mưa tháng Năm" by Bức Tường	—	—	—	
5	Trần Lê Bích Tuyết	20	Ho Chi Minh City	"Đã bao lần" by Dương Hoàng Yến	—			
6	Phạm Anh Vũ	27	Hanoi	"Chẳng nói nên lời" by Nguyễn Hoàng Dũng	—	—	—	—
7	Nguyễn Trương Minh Nguyệt	26	Hanoi	"Dù chỉ là" by Dương Hoàng Yến	—	—		—
8	Huỳnh Công Luận	25	Nha Trang	"Chỉ một câu" by Đức Phúc		—	—	—
9	Lương Thu Uyên	22	N/A	"Yêu mình anh" by Thu Minh	—	—	—	—
10	Trần Hồng Liên	18	Ho Chi Minh City	"thank u, next" by Ariana Grande		—		—
11	Zunni Hoàng Tùng Anh	26	Hanoi	"Daydream" by Soobin Hoàng Sơn		—	—	—
12	Nguyễn Thị Trang	—N/a	Hanoi	"Và em có anh" by Mỹ Tâm		—	—	—
13	Trần Đức Trường	21	Đồng Nai	"Dù chẳng phải anh" by Đinh Mạnh Ninh		(Note: Tuấn Hưng used his block on Thanh Hà, but because Thanh Hà turned her chair before Tuấn Hưng press his block, the block was regarded as invalid.)		

=== Episode 4 (May 5) ===
Order	Artist	Age	Hometown	Song	Coaches and artists choices			
Order	Artist	Age	Hometown	Song	Hoài Anh	Thanh Hà	Tuấn Ngọc	Tuấn Hưng
1	Juky San	21	Ho Chi Minh City	"Chuyện nắng" by Máy Bay Dấy Band	(Note: Trần Dung originally joined team Tuấn Hưng during her blind audition. But at the end of the Blind Audition course, coach Tuấn Hưng used his "Switch" on her in favor of another contestant, and switch her to special coach Hồ Hoài Anh's team.)	—		
2	Nguyễn Trần Minh Tân	22	Ho Chi Minh City	"7 Rings" by Ariana Grande	—	—	—	—
3	Nguyễn Cathy	16	Hanoi	"Hero" by Mariah Carey				
4	Hồng Hòa & Hồng Hiếu	22	Vũng Tàu	"Đừng yêu" by Thu Minh	—	—		
5	Nguyễn Thảo Vân	22	Hanoi	"Thanh âm" by Khả Linh	—	—		
6	Nguyễn Châu Nhi	19	—N/a	"Always Remember Us This Way" by Lady Gaga	—		—	—
7	Vương Chí Bảo	23	Ho Chi Minh City	"How Am I Supposed to Live Without You" by Michael Bolton	—			
8	Vũ Xuân Đạt	17	Hanoi	"Ôi trời ơi" by Bùi Công Nam	—		Team full	—
9	Trần Hà Thu	23	Hanoi	"Nếu mai này" by Khắc Hưng		Team full	Team full	—
10	Nguyễn Phương Thúy	N/A	N/A	"Lệ đá" by Khánh Ly	—	Team full	Team full	—
11	Mystery	25-28	Đắk Lắk/ Khánh Hòa/ Lâm Đồng	"Giữ lấy làm gì" by Grey-D		Team full	Team full	—
12	Nguyễn Hoàng Huy	23	Hanoi	"Bản ballad cho ..." by Lưu Thiên Hương	—	Team full	Team full	
13	S2	—N/a	Ho Chi Minh City/ Da Nang/ Đắk Lắk	"Phai" by Vũ Cát Tường		Team full	Team full	Team full
14	Lâm Bảo Ngọc	23	Hanoi	"If" by Vũ Cát Tường				

== The Battles ==
The Battle round was taped on April 12 and was broadcast from May 12, 2019. The Battles' advisors for this season are: Long Halo for team Hồ Hoài Anh, last season's coach Noo Phước Thịnh for team Thanh Hà, The Voice Kids coach Vũ Cát Tường for team Tuấn Ngọc and Nguyễn Hoàng Duy for team Tuấn Hưng. While battles are still pairings from within each team, a "Last choice" chair was added this season where a contestant who lost the battle but given a second chance by his/her coach is sent to. Coaches can switch out a battle loser in the chair in favor of a new losing artist, and the contestant who end up seated until the end of the Battle round would be saved and advanced to the Knockouts. In addition, each coach had one Steal.

Color key:

Artist won the Battle and advanced to the Knockouts
Artist lost the Battle but was stolen by another coach and advanced to the Knockouts
Artist lost the Battle but was saved by their coach and advanced to the Knockouts
Artist lost the Battle and was eliminated

Episode	Coach	Order	Winner	Song	Loser	'Steal' result			
Episode	Coach	Order	Winner	Song	Loser	Hoài Anh	Thanh Hà	Tuấn Ngọc	Tuấn Hưng
Episode 5 (May 12, 2019)	Thanh Hà	1	Bùi Tuấn Anh	"Sắc màu" by Trần Tiến / "Holiday" by Bee Gees	Nguyễn Hoài Vũ	—	✔	—	—
Episode 5 (May 12, 2019)	Tuấn Ngọc	2	Layla	"Ngày nắng" by Hoàng Quyên	Nguyễn Hoàng My	—	—	—N/a	—
Episode 5 (May 12, 2019)	Tuấn Hưng	3	Nguyễn Hoàng Bách	"Đừng nói tôi điên" by Hiền Hồ/ "Buông" by Bùi Anh Tuấn	Nguyễn Hoàng Huy	—	—	—	—N/a
Episode 5 (May 12, 2019)	Tuấn Ngọc	4	Nguyễn Thảo Vân	"Xa" by Hương Tràm	Nguyễn Trương Minh Nguyệt	—	—	—N/a	—
Episode 5 (May 12, 2019)	Thanh Hà	5	DOMINIX	"Yêu như lần yêu cuối" by Mai Tiến Dũng/ "Sợ yêu" by Thanh Hà	Diêu Ngọc Bích Trâm	—	✔	✔	✔
Episode 6 (May 19, 2019)	Thanh Hà	1	Trần Đức Trường	"Say Ah" by Trọng Hiếu	INNO	—	—N/a	—	—
Episode 6 (May 19, 2019)	Tuấn Hưng	2	Ella Beth	"Symphony" by Clean Bandit & Zara Larsson	Trần Hằng My	—	—	—	✔
Episode 6 (May 19, 2019)	Thanh Hà	3	Nguyễn Châu Nhi	"Tân thời" by Jun Phạm	Vũ Xuân Đạt	—	—N/a	✔	—
Episode 6 (May 19, 2019)	Tuấn Hưng	4	Hồng Hòa & Hồng Hiếu	"Tình nhân ơi" by Orange & BinZ/ "Và thế là hết" by Soobin Hoàng Sơn	Nguyễn Thanh Long	—	—	Steal used	—N/a
Episode 6 (May 19, 2019)	Tuấn Ngọc	5	Hoàng Đức Thịnh	"Như những phút ban đầu" by Hoài Lâm/ "Trái tim bên lề" by Bằng Kiều	Văn Võ Ngọc Nhân	—	✔	✔	✔
Episode 7 (May 26, 2019)	Tuấn Ngọc	1	Phan Thị Huỳnh Giao	"Ta còn yêu nhau" by Đức Phúc/ "Vài phút trước" by Vũ Cát Tường	Trần Duy Đạt	—	—	Team full	✔
Episode 7 (May 26, 2019)	Tuấn Hưng	2	Đỗ Hoài Nam	"I'm Not the Only One" by Sam Smith	David Bryan	—	—	Team full	Team full
Episode 7 (May 26, 2019)	Tuấn Ngọc	3	Vương Chí Bảo	"Rewrite the Stars" by Zac Efron & Zendaya	Trần Hồng Liên	—	—	Team full	Team full
Episode 7 (May 26, 2019)	Tuấn Hưng	4	Lâm Bảo Ngọc	"Ave Maria" by Franz Schubert	Nguyễn Cathy	✔	—	Team full	Team full
Episode 7 (May 26, 2019)	Thanh Hà	5	Trần Lê Bích Tuyết	"Muộn màng là từ lúc" by Mỹ Tâm/ "Ai khóc nỗi đau này" by Bảo Anh	Đinh Bảo Yến	Steal used	—N/a	Team full	Team full

== The Special coach's team ==
The show's first-ever "special coach" was introduced this season as a method to save unsuccessful artist during the earlier rounds of the competition, therefore worked separately from three other teams. The special coach has the right to decide his own team's battle rules.

=== Battles ===
For his first round, Hồ Hoài Anh paired his teams into five battles, which were all broadcast on the final episode of the Battle round. After all his five battles concluded, Hồ Hoài Anh sent through both Huỳnh Công Luận and Juky San to the Knockouts. The remaining fourteen contestant (including his stolen contestant) had to conduct a music video as a second shot to advance to the Knockouts. After reviewing all music videos, Hồ Hoài Anh advanced Nguyễn Cát Tiên, Phạm Thị Bảo Trân and Vũ Đức Thịnh to the Knockouts.

Episode	Coach	Order	Winner	Song	Loser
Episode 8 (June 2, 2019)	Hồ Hoài Anh	1	Nguyễn Cát Tiên	"Come Back Home" by Vũ Cát Tường	Trần Hà Thu
Episode 8 (June 2, 2019)	Hồ Hoài Anh	1	Nguyễn Cát Tiên	"Come Back Home" by Vũ Cát Tường	Nguyễn Thị Trang
Episode 8 (June 2, 2019)	Hồ Hoài Anh	2	Huỳnh Công Luận	"Thời thanh xuân sẽ qua" by Phạm Hồng Phước	—N/a
Episode 8 (June 2, 2019)	Hồ Hoài Anh	2	Juky San	"Thời thanh xuân sẽ qua" by Phạm Hồng Phước	—N/a
Episode 8 (June 2, 2019)	Hồ Hoài Anh	3	Phạm Thị Bảo Trân	"Trạm dừng chân" by Đen Vâu & Kimmese	Nguyễn Thùy Dương
Episode 8 (June 2, 2019)	Hồ Hoài Anh	3	Phạm Thị Bảo Trân	"Trạm dừng chân" by Đen Vâu & Kimmese	Zunni Hoàng Tùng Anh
Episode 8 (June 2, 2019)	Hồ Hoài Anh	3	Phạm Thị Bảo Trân	"Trạm dừng chân" by Đen Vâu & Kimmese	Nguyễn Khánh Linh
Episode 8 (June 2, 2019)	Hồ Hoài Anh	4	Vũ Đức Thịnh	"Tình đơn phương" by Lam Trường/ "Chạm đáy nỗi đau" by Erik/ "Trà sữa" by Quýt & Nho/ "Quá lâu" by Vinh Khuất	Đinh Nho Khoa
Episode 8 (June 2, 2019)	Hồ Hoài Anh	4	Vũ Đức Thịnh	"Tình đơn phương" by Lam Trường/ "Chạm đáy nỗi đau" by Erik/ "Trà sữa" by Quýt & Nho/ "Quá lâu" by Vinh Khuất	Nguyễn Tùng Hiếu
Episode 8 (June 2, 2019)	Hồ Hoài Anh	4	Vũ Đức Thịnh	"Tình đơn phương" by Lam Trường/ "Chạm đáy nỗi đau" by Erik/ "Trà sữa" by Quýt & Nho/ "Quá lâu" by Vinh Khuất	Hoàng Đình Quân
Episode 8 (June 2, 2019)	Hồ Hoài Anh	5	—N/a	"Hãy yêu nhau đi"/ "Để gió cuốn đi" by Trịnh Công Sơn	Mystery
Episode 8 (June 2, 2019)	Hồ Hoài Anh	5	—N/a	"Hãy yêu nhau đi"/ "Để gió cuốn đi" by Trịnh Công Sơn	S2

=== Knockouts ===
The remaining five artists performed a solo song each, with three saved by coach Hồ Hoài Anh and the other two eliminated.

Artist was chosen by coach and advanced to the Playoffs
Artist was eliminated

Episode	Coach	Order	Artist	Song	Result
Episode 9 (June 9, 2019)	Hồ Hoài Anh	1	Vũ Đức Thịnh	"Đường nào đến trái tim em" by The Wings Band	Eliminated
Episode 9 (June 9, 2019)	Hồ Hoài Anh	2	Nguyễn Cát Tiên	"Yếu đuối ai xem" by Jaykii	Eliminated
Episode 9 (June 9, 2019)	Hồ Hoài Anh	3	Juky San	"Nàng thơ xứ Huế" by Thùy Chi	Advanced
Episode 9 (June 9, 2019)	Hồ Hoài Anh	4	Phạm Thị Bảo Trân	"Không cần" by Đinh Hương	Advanced
Episode 9 (June 9, 2019)	Hồ Hoài Anh	5	Huỳnh Công Luận	"Anh ấy cô ấy" by Hà Anh Tuấn	Advanced

=== Playoffs ===
The remaining three artists, along with a saved contestant from the Cross Battles competed in a final separate round which was exclusive to the show's mobile app, YouTube channel and Facebook page. Four artists performed two solo songs each, with two saved by coach Hồ Hoài Anh and advanced to the Semi-final, while the other two were eliminated. Hồ Hoài Anh brought in advisor Long Halo, as well as former coaches Thu Minh and Tóc Tiên to help him choose his top 2.

Episode	Coach	Artist	Order	First song	Order	Second song	Result
Episode 12 (Digital, June 29, 2019)	Hồ Hoài Anh	Phạm Thị Bảo Trân	1	"Loving You Sunny" by Kimmese & Đen/ "Everyday" by SpaceSpeakers	5	"Kẻ thù" by Ngọt	Eliminated
Episode 12 (Digital, June 29, 2019)	Hồ Hoài Anh	Juky San	2	"Và thế là hết" by Chillies	6	"Sắp vào đông" by Huy Lê	Advanced
Episode 12 (Digital, June 29, 2019)	Hồ Hoài Anh	Huỳnh Công Luận	3	"Đừng hỏi em" by Mỹ Tâm	7	"Ngày hôm qua" by Vũ Cát Tường	Eliminated
Episode 12 (Digital, June 29, 2019)	Hồ Hoài Anh	Layla	4	"Tôi tìm thấy tôi" by Hồ Quỳnh Hương	8	"Người từng nói" by Đông Nhi	Advanced

== The Cross Battles ==
The Knockouts was taped on May 7 and broadcast from June 9. Contestants competed in the non-live Cross battles, as first applied last season. This season, however, no professional jury is featured and the result is decided solely by the public's vote. One contestant who lost the cross-battle would be selected by special coach Hồ Hoài Anh to join his team for the Playoffs.

On May 26, it was announced that a Wildcard vote would be conducted to save one losing artist in the Cross Battles to the Playoffs. The Wildcard artist was revealed at the beginning of the Comeback round.

Artist won the Cross Battle and advanced to the Live Playoffs
Artist lost the Cross Battle but selected by the special coach and advanced to the Live Playoffs
Artist lost the Cross Battle but received the Wildcard and advanced to the Playoffs
Artist lost the Cross Battle and was eliminated

Episode	Order	Challenge team				Challenged team			
Episode	Order	Coach	Song	Contestant	% vote	% vote	Contestant	Song	Coach
Episode 10 (June 16)	1	Tuấn Ngọc	"Xin còn gọi tên nhau" by Lệ Thu	Hoàng Đức Thịnh	58.77%	41.23%	Đỗ Hoài Nam	"Sau chia tay" by Phạm Hồng Phước	Tuấn Hưng
Episode 10 (June 16)	2	Tuấn Hưng	"Live For This Moment" by Hương Tràm	Hồng Hòa & Hồng Hiếu	30.77%	69.23%	Trần Đức Trường	"Một phút" by Andiez Nam Trương	Thanh Hà
Episode 10 (June 16)	3	Thanh Hà	"Yêu một ai khác" by Thanh Hà	Diêu Ngọc Bích Trâm	73.02%	26.98%	Phan Thị Huỳnh Giao	"Bài hát của em" by Uyên Linh	Tuấn Ngọc
Episode 10 (June 16)	4	Tuấn Hưng	"Mặt trời của em" by Phương Ly & Justa Tee	Trần Hằng My	57.75%	42.25%	Bùi Tuấn Anh	"Xin em" by Bùi Anh Tuấn	Thanh Hà
Episode 10 (June 16)	5	Tuấn Ngọc	"San Francisco" by Vũ Cát Tường	Vũ Xuân Đạt	53.35%	46.65%	DOMINIX	"Quay lưng" by Yến Lê	Thanh Hà
Episode 11 (June 23)	1	Thanh Hà	"Yêu 5" by Rhymastic	Nguyễn Châu Nhi	61.5%	38.5%	Nguyễn Hoàng Bách	"Phải có em" by Kai Đinh	Tuấn Hưng
Episode 11 (June 23)	2	Tuấn Ngọc	"Góc tối" by Nguyễn Hải Phong	Layla	49.13%	50.87%	Lâm Bảo Ngọc	"Killing Me Softly with His Song" by Lori Lieberman	Tuấn Hưng
Episode 11 (June 23)	3	Tuấn Hưng	"Xin anh đừng" by Đông Nhi	Trần Duy Đạt	71.51%	29.49%	Nguyễn Thảo Vân	"I Surrender" by Celine Dion	Tuấn Ngọc
Episode 11 (June 23)	4	Thanh Hà	"Hãy đến với em" by Ngọc Lan	Trần Lê Bích Tuyết	59.33%	40.67%	Vương Chí Bảo	"Em không là duy nhất" by Tóc Tiên	Tuấn Ngọc
Episode 11 (June 23)	5	Tuấn Ngọc	"Hẹn một mai" by Bùi Anh Tuấn	Văn Võ Ngọc Nhân	75.69%	24.31%	Ella Beth	"Cho em gần anh thêm chút nữa" by Hương Tràm	Tuấn Hưng

== The Playoffs ==
Color key:

Artist was saved by the Public's votes
Artist was placed in the bottom
Artist was saved by the Wildcard
Artist was eliminated

=== Week 1 (June 30) ===
The first round of the Playoffs was taped on June 6 and broadcast on June 30, 2019. Ten artists from team Thanh Hà, Tuấn Ngọc and Tuấn Hưng performed for the public's vote. At the end of the night, four artists with the lowest votes were eliminated.

Episode	Coach	Order	Artist	Song	Result
Episode 12 (June 30)	Thanh Hà	1	Trần Lê Bích Tuyết	"Đóa hoa hồng" by Chi Pu	Public's vote
Episode 12 (June 30)	Tuấn Hưng	2	Trần Hằng My	"Yếu đuối" by Nguyễn Hoàng Dũng	Eliminated
Episode 12 (June 30)	Tuấn Ngọc	3	Vũ Xuân Đạt	"Mẹ anh bảo cưới" by Hoàng Tôn & Mr.T	Bottom five
Episode 12 (June 30)	Thanh Hà	4	Diêu Ngọc Bích Trâm	"Giận anh" by Phương Vy	Public's vote
Episode 12 (June 30)	Tuấn Ngọc	5	Văn Võ Ngọc Nhân	"Đi đâu để thấy hoa bay" by Nguyễn Hoàng Dũng	Eliminated
Episode 12 (June 30)	Thanh Hà	6	Trần Đức Trường	"Cảm giác lúc ấy sẽ ra sao" by Lou Hoàng	Eliminated
Episode 12 (June 30)	Tuấn Hưng	7	Lâm Bảo Ngọc	"I Don't Believe" by Thu Minh	Public's vote
Episode 12 (June 30)	Tuấn Hưng	8	Trần Duy Đạt	"You Are My Everything" by Gummy	Public's vote
Episode 12 (June 30)	Thanh Hà	9	Nguyễn Châu Nhi	"Đừng yêu nữa em mệt rồi" by Min	Eliminated
Episode 12 (June 30)	Tuấn Ngọc	10	Hoàng Đức Thịnh	"Thư pháp" by Đan Trường	Public's vote

=== Week 2: Comeback (July 7) ===
The second round of the Playoffs, called Comeback, was taped on June 7 and broadcast on July 7, 2019. Nine artists (eight from all four teams and one Wildcard) performed for the public's vote. Two artists who received the fewest votes were eliminated, leaving seven artists advanced to the Semifinal.

Episode	Coach	Order	Artist	Song	Result
Episode 13 (July 7)	Thanh Hà	1	DOMINIX	"Hè muộn" by Bằng Kiều	Public's vote
Episode 13 (July 7)	Tuấn Ngọc	2	Hoàng Đức Thịnh	"Bác làm vườn và con chim sâu" by Trúc Nhân	Public's vote
Episode 13 (July 7)	Hồ Hoài Anh	3	Juky San	"Và thế là hết" by Chillies	Public's vote
Episode 13 (July 7)	Tuấn Hưng	4	Trần Duy Đạt	"Chơ vơ" by Vũ Cát Tường	Eliminated
Episode 13 (July 7)	Thanh Hà	5	Diêu Ngọc Bích Trâm	"Anh ơi ở lại" by Chi Pu	Bottom three
Episode 13 (July 7)	Tuấn Hưng	6	Lâm Bảo Ngọc	"I Will Go to You Like the First Snow"" by Ailee	Public's vote
Episode 13 (July 7)	Thanh Hà	7	Trần Lê Bích Tuyết	"Em mới là người yêu anh" by Min	Public's vote
Episode 13 (July 7)	Tuấn Ngọc	8	Vũ Xuân Đạt	"Xinh lung linh" by Ali Hoàng Dương	Eliminated
Episode 13 (July 7)	Hồ Hoài Anh	9	Layla	"Tôi tìm thấy tôi" by Hồ Quỳnh Hương	Public's vote

=== Week 3: Semifinal (July 14) ===
The Semifinal was broadcast on July 14, 2019. The top 7 performed a solo song each and a group performance with their coach. At the end of the night, five top vote-getter advanced to the Live Final, while the other two artists were eliminated. With DOMINIX's advancement to the final, this is the first time in the show's history that a group made it to the last stage of the competition.

Episode	Coach	Order	Artist	Song	Result
Episode 14 (July 14)	Hồ Hoài Anh	1	Layla	"Người từng nói" by Đông Nhi	Public's vote
Episode 14 (July 14)	Thanh Hà	2	Trần Lê Bích Tuyết	"Giả vờ say" by Đông Nhi	Bottom three
Episode 14 (July 14)	Hồ Hoài Anh	3	Juky San	"Sắp vào đông" by Huy Lê	Eliminated
Episode 14 (July 14)	Tuấn Ngọc	4	Hoàng Đức Thịnh	"Chưa bao giờ" by Trung Quân	Public's vote
Episode 14 (July 14)	Tuấn Hưng	5	Lâm Bảo Ngọc	"Never Enough" by Loren Allred	Public's vote
Episode 14 (July 14)	Thanh Hà	6	Diêu Ngọc Bích Trâm	"Tình nhân" by Hương Giang Idol	Eliminated
Episode 14 (July 14)	Thanh Hà	7	DOMINIX	"Berver" by Andiez Nam Trương	Public's vote

Non-competition performances
Order	Performer(s)	Song
14.1	Thanh Hà, Diêu Ngọc Bích Trâm & Trần Lê Bích Tuyết	"Dù đã biết" by Thanh Hà
14.2	Tuấn Ngọc & Hoàng Đức Thịnh	"Ghen" by Tuấn Ngọc
14.3	Hồ Hoài Anh, Layla & Juky San	"Ngược" by Hồ Hoài Anh
14.4	Tuấn Hưng & Lâm Bảo Ngọc	"Đêm cô đơn" by Tuấn Hưng & Lệ Quyên
14.5	Thanh Hà & DOMINIX	"Con yêu mẹ" by Vũ Thảo My/ "Chưa bao giờ mẹ kể" by Min & Erik/ "Muốn khóc thật to" by Trúc Nhân/ "Nhật ký của mẹ" by Hiền Thục/ "Nhà là nơi để về" by Yến Lê

=== Week 4: Live Final (July 21) ===
The Grand Final was broadcast live on July 21, 2019. Each finalists performed two times: a solo song and a duet with a guest artists. Voting was opened a week prior to the finale day online via website SaoStar.vn. The artist achieved the highest accumulated vote from the website and SMS was crowned the winner.

Episode	Coach	Artist	Order	Solo song	Order	Duet Song (with special guest)	Result
Episode 15 (July 21, 2019)	Tuấn Ngọc	Hoàng Đức Thịnh	1	"Tìm lại nhau" by Vũ Đức Mạnh	6	"Nơi tình yêu bắt đầu" by Bằng Kiều (with Giang Hồng Ngọc)	Winner (35.93%)
Episode 15 (July 21, 2019)	Thanh Hà	DOMINIX	2	"Trên đỉnh Phù Vân" by Mỹ Linh	7	"Đã hơn một lần" by Nguyễn Hải Yến/ "Firework" by Katy Perry (with Văn Mai Hương)	Third place (14.69%)
Episode 15 (July 21, 2019)	Tuấn Hưng	Lâm Bảo Ngọc	3	"Writing's on the Wall" by Sam Smith	8	"Độc ẩm" by Nguyễn Kiều Anh/ "Túy âm" by Xesi x Masew x Nhatnguyen (with Hà Lê)	Runner-up (28.32%)
Episode 15 (July 21, 2019)	Hồ Hoài Anh	Layla	4	"Là anh đó" by Andiez Nam Trương	9	"Ave Maria" by Franz Schubert/ "Take Me to Church" by Hozier (with Phạm Khánh Ngọc)	Fourth place (14.15%)
Episode 15 (July 21, 2019)	Thanh Hà	Trần Lê Bích Tuyết	5	"Hỏi thế gian tình là gì" (Original song)	10	"Ghen" by Min & ERIK (with ERIK)	Fifth place (6.43%)

Non-competition performances
Order	Performer	Song
15.1	The Voice of Vietnam 6 coaches	"Và Con Tim Đã Vui Trở Lại" by Đức Huy
15.2	Ali Hoàng Dương	"Ghét"/ "Đêm"

== Elimination charts ==
=== Overall ===
Artist's info

- Artist from Team Hồ Hoài Anh
- Artist from Team Thanh Hà
- Artist from Team Tuấn Ngọc
- Artist from Team Tuấn Hưng

Result details

- Winner
- Runner-up
- Third place
- Fourth Place
- Fifth Place
- Artist was saved by Wildcard
- Artist was saved by the public
- Artist was saved by coach (for the special coach's team) or placed in the bottom
- Artist was eliminated

Artist	Week 1	Week 2	Semi-Final	Finals
Hoàng Đức Thịnh	Safe	Safe	Safe	Winner
Lâm Bảo Ngọc	Safe	Safe	Safe	Runner-up
DOMINIX	Wildcard	Safe	Safe	3rd Place
Layla	Safe	Safe	Safe	4th Place
Trần Lê Bích Tuyết	Safe	Safe	Safe	5th Place
Diêu Ngọc Bích Trâm	Safe	Safe	Eliminated	Eliminated (Semi-final)
Juky San	Safe	Safe	Eliminated	Eliminated (Semi-final)
Trần Duy Đạt	Safe	Eliminated	Eliminated (Week 2)	
Vũ Xuân Đạt	Safe	Eliminated	Eliminated (Week 2)	
Văn Võ Ngọc Nhân	Eliminated	Eliminated (Week 1)		
Trần Đức Trường	Eliminated	Eliminated (Week 1)		
Trần Hằng My	Eliminated	Eliminated (Week 1)		
Huỳnh Công Luận	Eliminated	Eliminated (Week 1)		
Phạm Thị Bảo Trân	Eliminated	Eliminated (Week 1)		
Nguyễn Châu Nhi	Eliminated	Eliminated (Week 1)		

=== Teams ===
Artist's info

- Artist from Team Hồ Hoài Anh
- Artist from Team Thanh Hà
- Artist from Team Tuấn Ngọc
- Artist from Team Tuấn Hưng

Result details

- Winner
- Runner-up
- Third place
- Fourth Place
- Fifth Place
- Saved by Wildcard
- Artist was eliminated

Live show results per week
Artist	Week 1	Week 2	Semi-Final	Finals
Layla	Advanced	Advanced	Advanced	4th Place
Juky San	Advanced	Advanced	Eliminated	
Huỳnh Công Luận	Eliminated			
Phạm Thị Bảo Trân	Eliminated			
DOMINIX	Wildcard	Advanced	Advanced	3rd Place
Trần Lê Bích Tuyết	Advanced	Advanced	Advanced	5th Place
Diêu Ngọc Bích Trâm	Advanced	Advanced	Eliminated	
Trần Đức Trường	Eliminated			
Nguyễn Châu Nhi	Eliminated			
Hoàng Đức Thịnh	Advanced	Advanced	Advanced	Winner
Vũ Xuân Đạt	Advanced	Eliminated		
Văn Võ Ngọc Nhân	Eliminated			
Lâm Bảo Ngọc	Advanced	Advanced	Advanced	Runner-up
Trần Duy Đạt	Advanced	Eliminated		
Trần Hằng My	Eliminated			

== Contestants who appeared on previous shows or seasons ==
- Vũ Đức Thịnh was on the second season of The X Factor Vietnam, as a member of the group The Wings, where they came fourth.
- Nguyễn Tùng Hiếu competed on the first season of The Voice Kids and joined team Giang Hồ where he was eliminated in the Battle round.
- David Bryan was a member of Hotel FM, a band who won the Romanian national final for Eurovision 2011 and represented Romania at Eurovision 2011. He also competed on the second season of Vocea României where he was eliminated in the first live round.
- Trần Hằng My competed on the third season of The Voice Kids and joined team Giang Hồ, but was eliminated in the first live show.
- Đinh Nho Khoa appeared on the first season of The Voice Kids but failed to make a team.
- Diêu Ngọc Bích Trâm was on the second season of The X Factor Vietnam, as a member of the group BBQ, who was eliminated at the Four-chair Challenge stage.
- Ella Beth appeared on the fourth season of Vietnam's Got Talent but did not pass the Judges' Auditions.
- Nguyễn Tiến Việt competed on the fifth season of Vietnam Idol and finished in fifth place.
