= Blaxy Girls discography =

- Studio albums: 2
- Extended plays: 1
- Singles: 11
- Music videos: 9

The discography of Romanian all-female rock band Blaxy Girls comprises two studio albums (one under production), five singles (one under production) and five music videos (one promotional). Their debut studio album was released in December, 2008 after a year of work. Three of their singles - "If You Feel My Love", "Dear Mama" and "I Have My Life" - reached top 40 on Romanian Top 100, with the first two being Top 10 efforts. They participated at 2009 Selectia Nationala with the song Dear Mama, where they finished in a tie for the second place. In 2010 they had the intention to participate at the Selectia Nationala with Save The World, but they withdrawn the song.

== Studio albums ==
Year	Album details
2008	If You Feel My Love: Released: December 12, 2008; Format: CD, digital download; Label: Roton
2010	Save the World: Released: May 2010; Format: CD; Label: Roton

== EP ==
Year	Album details
2009	I Have My Life: EP: Released: June 27, 2009; Format: digital download; Label: Roton

- Note: The EP was released only via iTunes, and it contains the tracks: I Have My Life, E vina Mea and Nu Suporti.

== Singles ==
Year	Single	Album
2008	"If You Feel My Love" (and Oare Trebuie sa Pierzi)	If You Feel My Love
2009	"Dear Mama"	If You Feel My Love
2009	"I Have My Life"	If You Feel My Love
2010	"Save the World"	Save the World
2010	"Rock Yourself"	Save the World
2011	"Mr and Mrs President"	Save the World

== Music videos ==
Year	Title	Director
2008	"If You Feel My Love/Oare Trebuie să Pierzi"	Florin Botea
2009	"Dear Mama"	Florin Botea
2009	"Dear Mama (ESC Video)"	Florin Botea
2009	"I Have My Life/E Vina Mea"	Florin Botea
2009	"Save the World"	Florin Botea
