= Romania in the Eurovision Song Contest 2011 =

- Eurovision Song Contest 2011
- Participating broadcaster: Televiziunea Română (TVR)
- Country: Romania
- Selection process: Selecţia Naţională 2011
- Selection date: 31 December 2010

Competing entry
- Song: "Change"
- Artist: Hotel FM
- Songwriters: Gabriel Băruță; Alexandra Ivan

Placement
- Semi-final result: Qualified (4th, 111 points)
- Final result: 17th, 77 points

Participation chronology

Romania was represented at the Eurovision Song Contest 2011 with the song "Change" written by Gabriel Băruță and Alexandra Ivan. The song was performed by the band Hotel FM. The Romanian broadcaster Televiziunea Română (TVR) organised the national final Selecția Națională 2011 in order to select the Romanian entry for the 2011 contest in Düsseldorf, Germany. Thirteen entries were selected to compete in the national final on 31 December 2010 where "Change" performed by Hotel FM was selected as the winner after scoring top marks from an eleven-member jury panel and a public televote.

Romania was drawn to compete in the second semi-final of the Eurovision Song Contest which took place on 12 May 2011. Performing during the show in position 14, "Change" was announced among the top 10 entries of the second semi-final and therefore qualified to compete in the final on 14 May. It was later revealed that Romania placed fourth out of the 19 participating countries in the semi-final with 111 points. In the final, Romania performed in position 17 and placed seventeenth out of the 25 participating countries, scoring 77 points.

== Background ==
Prior to the 2011 contest, Romania had participated in the Eurovision Song Contest 12 times since its first entry in 1994. To this point, its highest placing in the contest has been third place, which the nation achieved on two occasions: in 2005 with the song "Let Me Try" performed by Luminița Anghel and Sistem, and in 2010 with the song "Playing with Fire" performed by Paula Seling and Ovi. To this point, Romania has qualified to the final on every occasion since the introduction of semi-finals to the format of the contest in 2004.

The Romanian national broadcaster, Televiziunea Română (TVR), broadcasts the event within Romania and organizes the selection process for the nation's entry. TVR has consistently selected the Romanian Eurovision entry through national finals that feature a competition among several artists and songs. The broadcaster confirmed their intentions to participate at the 2011 Eurovision Song Contest on 1 October 2010. TVR had set up national finals with several artists to choose both the song and performer to compete at Eurovision for Romania, a procedure which the broadcaster opted for once again to select their 2011 entry.

== Before Eurovision ==
=== Selecţia Naţională 2011 ===
The logo of Selecția Națională 2011

Selecția Națională 2011 was the national final format developed by TVR in order to select Romania's entry for the Eurovision Song Contest 2011. The competition took place at the TVR studios in Bucharest on 31 December 2010 and was hosted by Paula Seling and Ovi which represented Romania in the Eurovision Song Contest 2010 with Gianina Corondan hosting segments from the green room. The show was televised on TVR1, TVR HD, TVRi as well as online via the broadcaster's website tvr.ro.

==== Competing entries ====
TVR opened a submission period for artists and composers to submit their entries between 1 October 2010 and 5 November 2010. The broadcaster received 90 submissions after the submission deadline passed, of which 84 were eligible for consideration. An expert committee reviewed the received submissions between 9 and 10 November 2010 and selected thirteen entries for the national final. The committee also reserved the right to change the performer of a selected song and should this be the case, composers were required to submit the final version of their songs with its new performers by 14 November 2010.

The members of the expert committee that selected the thirteen entries were:

- Eduard Cârcotă – composer
- Alexandra Cepraga – music director
- Manuel Dinculescu – Radio 21, Vibe FM
- Horia Moculescu – composer, producer
- Ştefan Naftanailă – Radio Romania
- George Natsis – composer
- Christian Raetscher – impresario
- Gabriela Scraba – Radio Romania
- Elena Stirbescu – TVR director
- Dan Teodorescu – singer-songwriter
- Andrei Tudor – composer

The competing entries were announced during a press conference on 15 November 2010 held at the Howard Johnson Hotel in Bucharest. TVR hosted a presentation evening on 1 December where the competing artists performed their songs live for the public.

Artist	Song	Songwriter(s)
Adi Cristescu	"One by One"	Adrian Cristescu
Blaxy Girls	"It's So Fine"	Costi Ioniță, Rucsandra Iliescu
Claudia Pavel	"I Want U to Want Me"	Andrei Filip, Pontus Assarsson, Tobias Lundgren, Johan Fransson, Tim Larsson
Dalma	"Song for Him"	Liviu Elekes, Roxana Elekes
Dan Helciug	"My Facebook Girl"	Dan Helciug
Direcția 5	"Cinema Love"	Marian Ionescu, Andrei Haţegan
Distinto, Ianna and Anthony Icuagu	"Open Your Eyes"	Cristian Faur
Hotel FM	"Change"	Gabriel Băruță, Alexandra Ivan
Mihai Alexandru feat. B-Body and Soul	"Bang Bang"	Mihai Alexandru, Japhet Niven
Laurențiu Cazan	"We Can Change the World"	Laurențiu Cazan
Leticia	"Dreaming of You"	Play & Win
Rallsa	"Take Me Down"	Berehoi Alexandru, Sergiu Gelu Ene
Silvia Ștefănescu	"I Can't Breathe Without You"	Elvin Dandel

==== Final ====
The final took place on 31 December 2010. Thirteen songs competed and the winner, "Change" performed by Hotel FM, was determined by the 50/50 combination of the votes from an eleven-member jury panel and public televoting. A BMW 3 Series (E90) car was also awarded to the songwriters responsible for the winning entry. The members of the jury panel that voted were: Adrian Ordean (composer), Alexandra Cepraga (music director), Andrei Tudor (composer), Gabriel Marica (music editor), Niamh Kavanagh (Irish singer, winner of the Eurovision Song Contest 1993 and representative of Ireland in the Eurovision Song Contest 2010), Eduard Cârcotă (composer), Chiara Siracusa (Maltese singer, represented Malta in the Eurovision Song Contest 1998, 2005 and 2009), Lucian Avramescu (poet), Olivier Vanhoutte (Belgian journalist), Daniel Iordăchioaie (interpreter) and Dan Manoliu (entertainment editor). In addition to the performances of the competing entries, the interval acts featured performances by the members of the jury panel Chiara Siracusa, Johnny Logan and Niamh Kavanagh.

Final – 31 December 2010
R/O	Artist	Song	Jury		Televote		Total	Place
R/O	Artist	Song	Votes	Points	Votes	Points	Total	Place
1	Adi Cristescu	"One by One"	35	2	438	2	4	8
2	Dalma	"Song for Him"	39	3	334	0	3	11
3	Leticia	"Dreaming of You"	47	6	643	4	10	6
4	Silvia Ştefănescu	"I Can't Breathe Without You"	28	1	431	1	2	12
5	Blaxy Girls	"It's So Fine"	14	0	855	6	6	7
6	Claudia Pavel	"I Want U to Want Me"	19	0	480	3	3	10
7	Laurențiu Cazan	"We Can Change the World"	57	7	659	5	12	5
8	Dan Helciug	"My Facebook Girl"	41	4	290	0	4	9
9	Distinto, Ianna and Anthony Icuagu	"Open Your Eyes"	44	5	1,560	12	17	2
10	Direcția 5	"Cinema Love"	105	10	915	7	17	3
11	Rallsa	"Take Me Down"	9	0	302	0	0	13
12	Hotel FM	"Change"	116	12	1,321	10	22	1
13	Mihai Alexandru feat. B-Body and Soul	"Bang Bang"	84	8	1,018	8	16	4

=== Controversy ===
In February 2011, the Anti-Discrimination Alliance of All Dads (T.A.T.A.) proposed TVR and the head of the Romanian delegation at the Eurovision Song Contest Marina Almăşan for the removal of Hotel FM's lead singer David Bryan after social media leaks of pornographic videos between Bryan and his girlfriend, which "damages Romania's image". Almăşan later stated that the broadcaster and Romania's image had nothing to do with Bryan's personal affairs and discussions on the Internet.

=== Promotion ===
Hotel FM made several appearances across Europe to specifically promote "Change" as the Romanian Eurovision entry. On 23 and 26 February, Hotel FM performed "Change" during the Bulgarian Eurovision national final and the Moldovan Eurovision national final, respectively. Between 22 and 24 April, Hotel FM took part in promotional activities in Brussels and Ghent, Belgium and performed during the Eurovision "de luxe" event held at the Cocteau venue. In addition to their international appearances, Hotel FM also completed promotional activities in Romania where they performed during the special concert Düsseldorf, venim!, which was held at the Liceul Teoretic "Nichita Stănescu" in Bucharest on 9 April.

== At Eurovision ==
All countries except the "Big Five" (France, Germany, Italy, Spain and the United Kingdom), and the host country, are required to qualify from one of two semi-finals in order to compete for the final; the top ten countries from each semi-final progress to the final. The European Broadcasting Union (EBU) split up the competing countries into six different pots based on voting patterns from previous contests, with countries with favourable voting histories put into the same pot. On 17 January 2011, an allocation draw was held which placed each country into one of the two semi-finals, as well as which half of the show they would perform in. Romania was placed into the second semi-final, to be held on 12 May 2011, and was scheduled to perform in the second half of the show. The running order for the semi-finals was decided through another draw on 15 March 2011 and Romania was set to perform in position 14, following the entry from Slovenia and before the entry from Estonia.

All three shows were broadcast in Romania on TVR1, TVRi and TVR HD with commentary by Liana Stanciu and Bogdan Pavlică. The Romanian spokesperson, who announced the Romanian votes during the final, was Malvina Cservenschi.

=== Semi-final ===
Hotel FM took part in technical rehearsals on 12 and 15 May, followed by dress rehearsals on 18 and 19 May. This included the jury show on 18 May where the professional juries of each country watched and voted on the competing entries.

The stage show featured the lead singer of Hotel FM David Bryan dressed in a white shirt, black waistcoat and tight black trousers with white stripes designed by Simona Hulber and joined on stage by the two remaining members of the band playing the drums and piano, both dressed in suits, and two dancers dressed in black suits and hats which also played the trumpet. The background LED screens displayed pulsating blue and yellow circles and ovals, while the stage floor displayed flickering lights. The performance also featured pyrotechnic effects.

At the end of the show, Romania was announced as having finished in the top ten and subsequently qualifying for the grand final. It was later revealed that Romania placed fourth in the semi-final, receiving a total of 111 points.

=== Final ===
Shortly after the second semi-final, a winners' press conference was held for the ten qualifying countries. As part of this press conference, the qualifying artists took part in a draw to determine the running order for the final. This draw was done in the order the countries were announced during the semi-final. Romania was drawn to perform in position 17, following the entry from Germany and before the entry from Austria.

Hotel FM once again took part in dress rehearsals on 13 and 14 May before the final, including the jury final where the professional juries cast their final votes before the live show. The band performed a repeat of their semi-final performance during the final on 14 May. At the conclusion of the voting, Romania finished in seventeenth place with 77 points.

=== Voting ===
Voting during the three shows consisted of 50 percent public televoting and 50 percent from a jury deliberation. The jury consisted of five music industry professionals who were citizens of the country they represent. This jury was asked to judge each contestant based on: vocal capacity; the stage performance; the song's composition and originality; and the overall impression by the act. In addition, no member of a national jury could be related in any way to any of the competing acts in such a way that they cannot vote impartially and independently.

Following the release of the full split voting by the EBU after the conclusion of the competition, it was revealed that Romania had placed fourteenth with the public televote and thirteenth with the jury vote in the final. In the public vote, Romania scored 79 points, while with the jury vote, Romania scored 87 points. In the second semi-final, Romania placed third with the public televote with 121 points and fifth with the jury vote, scoring 85 points.

Below is a breakdown of points awarded to Romania and awarded by Romania in the second semi-final and grand final of the contest. The nation awarded its 12 points to Moldova in the semi-final and the final of the contest.

==== Points awarded to Romania ====
Points awarded to Romania (Semi-final 2)
Score	Country
12 points	Italy; Moldova
10 points	Belgium
8 points	Cyprus; France
7 points	Israel; Sweden
6 points	Austria; Denmark; Estonia; Germany; Slovakia
5 points	Latvia
4 points	Macedonia; Netherlands
3 points	Ireland
2 points	
1 point	Bulgaria

Points awarded to Romania (Final)
Score	Country
12 points	Italy; Moldova
10 points	Belgium
8 points	Spain
7 points	
6 points	Azerbaijan; Bulgaria; Israel
5 points	Turkey
4 points	Denmark; Netherlands
3 points	
2 points	
1 point	Austria; Estonia; Hungary; Ireland

==== Points awarded by Romania ====
Points awarded by Romania (Semi-final 2)
Score	Country
12 points	Moldova
10 points	Slovenia
8 points	Belgium
7 points	Sweden
6 points	Ireland
5 points	Denmark
4 points	Israel
3 points	Slovakia
2 points	Ukraine
1 point	Belarus

Points awarded by Romania (Final)
Score	Country
12 points	Moldova
10 points	Azerbaijan
8 points	Greece
7 points	Hungary
6 points	Italy
5 points	Spain
4 points	Slovenia
3 points	Sweden
2 points	Ukraine
1 point	Lithuania
