= Welcome to the World =

Welcome to the World may refer to:

- Welcome to the World (album), a 1997 album by Psycho Motel
- Welcome to the World (Massive Wagons album), 2016
- "Welcome to the World" (Noiseworks song), 1987
- "Welcome to the World" (Kevin Rudolf song), 2009
- "Welcome to the World" (T.I. song), 2010
- "Welcome to the World", by Ed Sheeran from his album =, 2022

== See also ==
- Welcome to My World (disambiguation)
- Welcome to Our World, an album by Timbaland & Magoo
