= Radio Noroc =

Programming
- Format: Romanian- and Moldovan-language contemporary hit radio

History
- First air date: November 16, 2005

Links
- Website: radionoroc.md

Radio Noroc (English: Luck Radio) is a Romanian language radio station in the Republic of Moldova.

== History ==
In July 2022, Ces Ciuhrii acquired Noroc Media which owns Radio Noroc and Noroc TV. In February 2022, the state run Audiovisual Council sanctioned Noroc TV television for unlicensed broadcasting beginning October 2021.

== FM Broadcasts ==
- Chişinău - 99.7
- Bălți - 197.2
- Florești - 104.3
- Orhei - 98.3
- Nisporeni - 90.2
- Hânceşti - 106.2
- Iargara - 100.9
- Ştefan Vodă - 106.3
- Comrat - 99.5
- Căuşeni - 99.9
