= I Have My Life =

Song by Romanian teenage group Blaxy Girls

Single by Blaxy Girls

from the album If You Feel My Love
- A-side: "I Have My Life"
- B-side: "E Vina Mea"
- Released: June 23, 2009
- Recorded: 2008
- Genre: Teen rock, pop rock
- Length: 3:41
- Label: Roton
- Songwriters: Costi Ioniţă, Rucsandra Iliescu
- Producer: Costi Ioniţă

Blaxy Girls singles chronology
"Dear Mama" (2009)	"I Have My Life" (2009)	"Save The World" (2010)

Music video
- "I Have My Life" on YouTube (posted by BlaxyGirlsTV)

I Have My Life is a song by Romanian teenage pop/rock musical group Blaxy Girls. The song was released in July 2009, being a remake of their previous song entitled "Nu Suporţi" (en. : You Can't Tolerate). The song was also translated into Romanian. It's their third song that reached top 40 in Romanian Top 100.

== Music video ==
A music video for the song was shot in early June and premiered on June 23, 2009 on Kiss TV. The video is an excerpt from a Blaxy Girls concert, held in June at Palatul Copiilor in Bucharest, special for shooting this video and singing in premiere their new song "Revolution". Rucsy's mother is starring again in a Blaxy Girls music video, playing her own role. In this video, Rucsy is broken-hearted by a boy and her mother tries to bring her back on the stage to continue the show along with the other girls. The video starts with Rucsy refreshing in a public toilet, then the "Blaxy Girls - I Have My Life" title appears. During the video, the words which Rucsy, her mother and the producer are speaking are subtitled in English and either in Romanian language. There is also a poster with Blaxy Girls appearing in the background, where it's written "Blaxy Girls - Moment's Revelation!".

== Live performance ==
Blaxy Girls sung live the song at Palatul Copiilor, Bucharest, in June, 2009. That show was recorded and used in the music video for "I Have My Life". They also performed it during the Mamaia Festival, in August, and promoted it on "Neatza cu Razvan si Dani", on Antena 1, in September 2009, along with "Sar". They had also performed "I Have My Life" in their 100% live show in Club Phoenix, Constanţa, in November 2009.

== Release history ==
Region	Date	Format	Label
Romania	June 23, 2009	digital, Radio	Roton Records
Eastern Europe	June 27, 2009	EP	Roton Records

== Track listing ==
- Official single Romania/Bulgaria
1. "Nu Suporţi" – 3:54
2. "I Have My Life" – 3:41
3. "E Vina Mea/E Vina Ta" – 3:41
4. "I Have My Life" (Karaoke version) – 3:41
5. "Nu Suporţi (EastEuropean MegaMix) – 6:12

=== EP ===
An EP was released only on internet in July 2009.

- iTunes EP
1. "Nu Suporţi" – 3:54
2. "I Have My Life" – 3:41
3. "E Vina Mea/E Vina Ta" – 3:41
4. "Nu Suporţi (EastEuropean MegaMix) – 6:12
