= Wonderful (Iris song) =

Single by Iris
- Released: 18 November 2011
- Recorded: 2010–2011
- Genre: Dance
- Length: 3:03
- Label: SonicAngel
- Songwriter(s): Guus Fluit, Wouter Vander Veken, Piet Vastenavondt
- Producer(s): Guus Fluit, Wouter Vander Veken

Iris singles chronology
"Wonderful" (2011)	"Would You?" (2012)

"Wonderful" is the debut single by Belgian female singer Iris. The song was written by Guus Fluit, Wouter Vander Veken and Piet Vastenavondt. It was released in Belgium as a digital download on 18 November 2011.

== Music video ==
A music video for the song "Wonderful" was uploaded to YouTube on 1 June 2011 at a total length of three minutes and eleven seconds.

== Track listing ==
Digital download

1. "Wonderful" – 3:03

== Credits and personnel ==
- Lead vocals – Iris
- Producers – Guus Fluit, Wouter Vander Veken
- Lyrics – Guus Fluit, Wouter Vander Veken, Piet Vastenavondt
- Label: SonicAngel

== Charts ==
Chart (2011)	Peak position
Belgium (Ultratop 50 Flanders)	28

== Release history ==
Region	Date	Format	Label
Belgium	18 November 2011	Digital Download	SonicAngel
