= Witloof Bay =

Belgian a cappella group

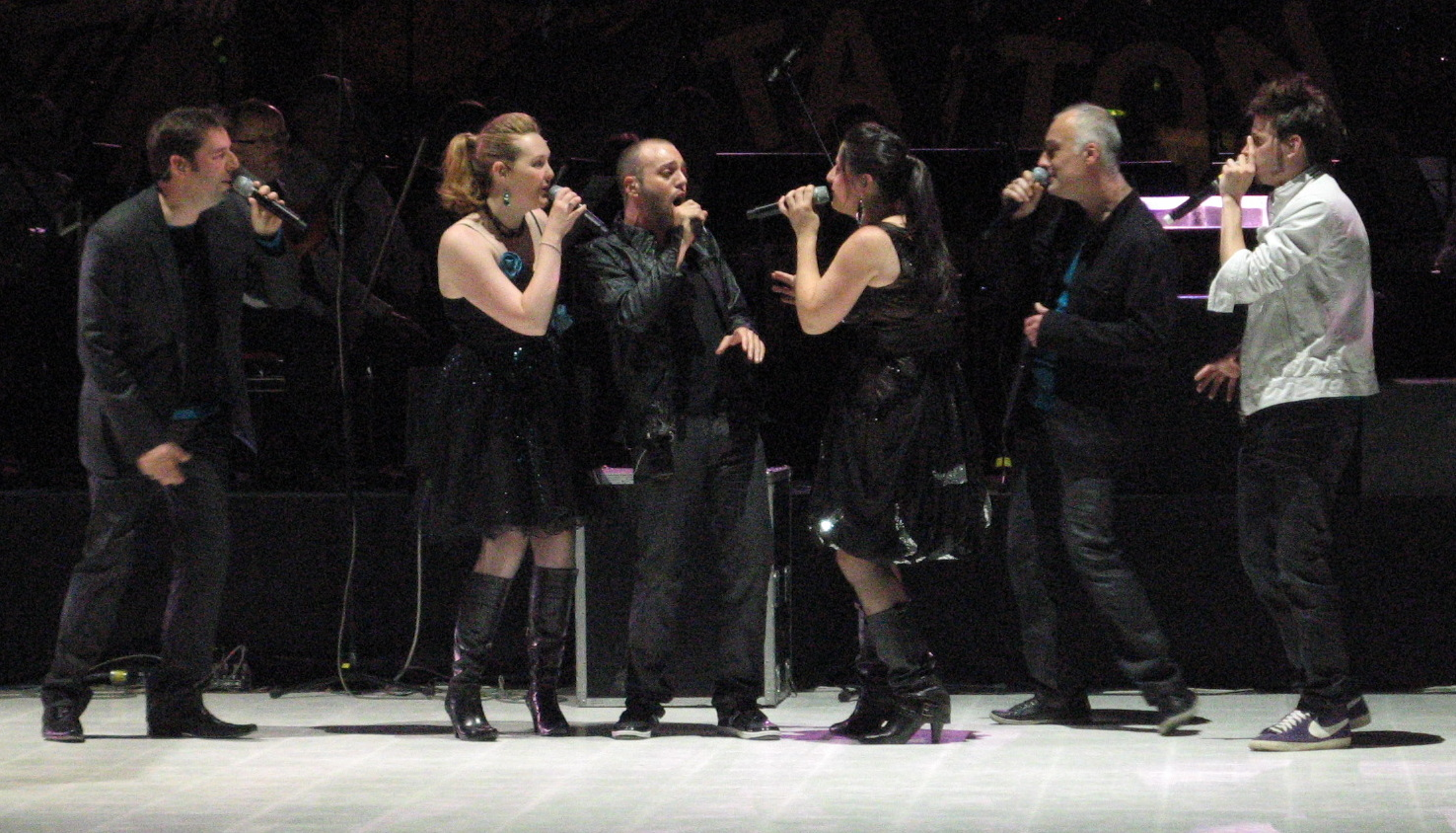

Background information
- Origin: Belgium
- Genres: Beatbox, jazz, a cappella
- Years active: 2005–present
- Members: Stijn Bearelle; Etienne Debaisieux; Benoît Giaux; Nicolas Dorian; Florence Huby; Mathilde Sevrin
- Past members: Senjka Danhieux (RoxorLoops)

Witloof Bay is a Belgian a cappella group.

== Biography ==
In 2005 six friends who all shared a love of jazz, pop, a cappella and beatbox decided to perform as a group. They took their inspiration from The Real Group, Take 6, The Swingle Singers and The Singers Unlimited. The band sing both in English and French. The band members themselves also come from all parts of the Belgian kingdom: Wallonia, Flanders and Brussels, thus the group believes they truly represent Belgium as a whole.

In 2008 the group released their first eponymously titled album.

== Eurovision 2011 ==
On 12 February 2011, Witloof Bay won the right to represent Belgium in the Eurovision Song Contest 2011. They took part in the second semi-final, held on 12 May 2011, but failed to qualify for the final, losing out by 1 point.

== Discography ==
=== Album releases ===
Year	Album
2008	Witloof Bay

=== Singles ===
Year	Single	Peak chart positions		Album
Year	Single	BEL (FLA)	BEL (WAL)	Album
2011	"With Love Baby"	42	50	TBA
2013	"Elle s'en va"			

Preceded by Tom Dice with "Me and My Guitar"	Belgium in the Eurovision Song Contest; 2011	Succeeded by Iris with "Would You?"
