= Welcome to My World =

Welcome to My World may refer to:

== Albums ==
- Welcome to My World (Dean Martin album), 1967
- Welcome to My World (Elvis Presley album), 1977
- Welcome to My World (Jonathan Fagerlund album), 2009
- Welcome to My World (Rosie Gaines album), 2000
- Welcome to My World, by Jah Wobble, 2010

== Songs ==
- "Welcome to My World" (Jim Reeves song), 1964
- "Welcome to My World" (Iris song), 2012
- "Welcome to My World" (Mýa song), 2015
- "Welcome to My World", by Tina Arena from In Deep, 1997
- ""Welcome to My World (Aespa song)", 2023

== Other ==
- Welcome to My World, a 2016 unaired TV series featuring Chloe Lukasiak

== See also ==
- My World and Welcome to It, an American television sitcom
