= Tomorrow I'll Be OK =

Single by Airis
- Released: 8 July 2013
- Recorded: 2012/13
- Genre: Pop
- Length: 3:05
- Label: CNR Music Belgium
- Songwriter(s): Yves Gaillard, Jo Casters

Airis singles chronology
"Welcome to My World" (2012)	"Tomorrow I'll Be OK" (2013)

"Tomorrow I'll Be OK" is a single by Belgian female singer Airis. The song was written by Yves Gaillard and Jo Casters. It was released in Belgium as a digital download on 8 July 2013. The song peaked at number 40 in Belgium.

== Track listing ==
Digital download

1. "Tomorrow I'll Be Ok" - 3:05

== Chart performance ==
=== Weekly charts ===
Chart (2011)	Peak position
Belgium (Ultratop 50 Flanders)	40

== Release history ==
Region	Date	Format	Label
Belgium	8 July 2013	Digital Download	CNR Music Belgium
