= Welcome to My World (Iris song) =

Single by Iris

from the album Seventeen
- Released: 19 June 2012
- Recorded: 2011
- Genre: Pop
- Length: 3:23
- Label: SonicAngel
- Songwriter(s): Alain Croisy, A. Jarnija, A. Dorjbayar
- Producer(s): Roel De Ruijter

Iris singles chronology
"Would You?" (2012)	"Welcome to My World" (2012)	"Tomorrow I'll Be OK" (2013)

"Welcome to My World" is a single by Belgian female singer Iris. The song was written by Alain Croisy, A. Jarnija, A. Dorjbayar. It was released in Belgium as a digital download on 19 June 2012 as the third single from her debut studio album Seventeen (2012).

== Track listing ==
Digital download

1. "Welcome to My World" – 3:23

== Credits and personnel ==
- Lead vocals – Iris
- Producers – Roel De Ruijter
- Lyrics – Alain Croisy, A. Jarnija, A. Dorjbayar
- Label: SonicAngel

== Charts ==
Chart (2011)	Peak position
Belgium (Ultratip Bubbling Under Flanders)	12

== Release history ==
Region	Date	Format	Label
Belgium	19 June 2012	Digital Download	SonicAngel
