= Iris (singer) =

- Born: Laura van den Bruel; 19 January 1995 (age 31); Morkhoven, Belgium
- Genres: Pop
- Occupation: Singer
- Years active: 2010 – present
- Label: SonicAngel
- Website: www.sonicangel.com/artist/airis

Laura van den Bruel, known as Iris or Airis (born 19 January 1995), is a Belgian singer.

== Eurovision ==
On 18 November 2011, it was announced by Vlaamse Radio- en Televisieomroeporganisatie (VRT), that Iris would represent Belgium in the Eurovision Song Contest 2012. She performed the song "Would You?", finished second last in the first semi-final, and did not make the Eurovision final. In 2014, she returned to the contest as a member of the Belgian jury.

== Discography ==
=== Albums ===
Title	Album details	Peak chart positions
Title	Album details	BEL (VL)
Seventeen	Released: 26 April 2012; Label: SonicAngel; Formats: CD, digital download	30

=== Singles ===
Title	Year	Peak chart positions	Album
Title	Year	BEL (VL)	Album
"Wonderful"	2011	28	Seventeen
"Would You?"	2012	19	Seventeen
"Welcome to My World"	2012	— (Note: "Welcome to My World" did not enter the Ultratop 50, but peaked at number 12 on the Flemish Ultratip chart.)	Seventeen
"Tomorrow I'll Be OK"	2013	40	Non-album singles
"Lost for One Day"	2014	50	Non-album singles
"Heartbreaker"	2015	88	Non-album singles
"I Will Stand By You"	2016	—	Non-album singles
"—" denotes single that did not chart or was not released.

Preceded by Witloof Bay with "With Love Baby"	Belgium in the Eurovision Song Contest; 2012	Succeeded by Roberto Bellarosa with "Love Kills"
