= Noroc TV =

Noroc TV is a Moldovan television station that broadcasts especially music. It is the television version of the popular radio station Radio Noroc.

Noroc TV is broadcasting on most of the cable networks of Moldova and is broadcasting digitally in DVB-T on channel 51.

== History ==
In July 2022, Ces Ciuhrii acquired Noroc Media which owns Radio Noroc and Noroc TV. In February 2022, the state run Audiovisual Council sanctioned Noroc TV television for unlicensed broadcasting beginning October 2021.
