= Muz TV Moldova =

Muz-TV Moldova
- Country: Moldova

History
- Launched: 2000
- Closed: 31 May 2014

Muz-TV Moldova was a Moldovan feed of Russian music TV Channel Muz-TV. It began airing in 2000, and was later closed in 2014.
