= Hotel FM =

Romanian band

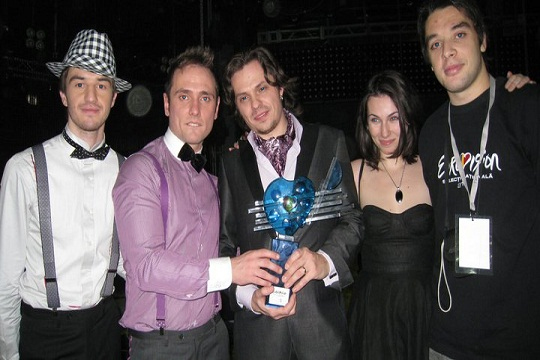

Background information
- Origin: Oradea, Romania
- Genres: Pop, Rock
- Years active: 2005-present
- Members: Gabriel Băruţa (piano); Alex Szűz (drums)
- Past members: Darius Neagu (percussion); Vicky Sava (harp); Marius Văduva (percussion); Diana Mărmăneanu (dancer); Vlady Săteanu (bassist); Gabi Drăgan (drums); Nicolae Vedinas (vocals, flute); David Bryan (singer)

Hotel FM is a Romanian band, formed in April 2005 by British expatriate David Bryan and his friends Gabriel Băruţa and Alex Szűz. The band held concerts in several cities in Romania and Germany and launched a promotional CD in spring 2006.

Founding member Bryan, who is lead singer, is originally from Newton Aycliffe in North East England, where he worked as a binman before settling in Romania.

The Hotel FM story began in 2005, when the Romanian composer Gabriel Băruţa recruited a few musicians from his hometown Oradea to create a new sound, a modern pop-rock feel based on melody and innovation, specific to the songs he wrote.

Throughout the years, Hotel FM has comprised Nicolae Vedinaş (vocals, flute), Berek Szilard (vocals), Marius Pop (guitar), Vlady Săteanu (bass), Gabi Drăgan (drums) and Sanyi Zakar (guitar).

The band has played many concerts in cities of Romania and Germany and released a promotional CD in the spring of 2006.

== Eurovision ==
Hotel FM placed 4th in the Eurovision 2010 national selection final with song "Come As One". The Hotel FM line-up for the Romanian finals was: David Bryan (vocals), Gabriel Băruţa (guitar and backing vocals), Vicky Sava (backing vocals) and Darius Neagu (drums, backing vocals), accompanied by the dancers Mihuţ “Levi” Lennon and Diana Mărmăreanu.

The band entered the Romanian national final for Eurovision 2011 with the song "Change" (music: Gabriel Băruţa, lyrics: Alexandra Ivan and Băruţa). They won the national final with 22 points, earning the right to represent Romania at the Eurovision Song Contest 2011. They qualified from the 2nd semifinal, on 12 May, and competed in the final, on 14 May, coming 17th.

Awards and achievements
Preceded by Paula Seling and Ovi with "Playing with Fire"	Romania in the Eurovision Song Contest; 2011	Succeeded by Mandinga with "Zaleilah"
