= Belgium in the Eurovision Song Contest 2012 =

- Eurovision Song Contest 2012
- Participating broadcaster: Vlaamse Radio- en Televisieomroeporganisatie (VRT)
- Country: Belgium
- Selection process: Artist: Internal selection Song: Eurosong 2012: Een song voor Iris
- Selection date: Artist: 18 November 2011 Song: 17 March 2012

Competing entry
- Song: "Would You?"
- Artist: Iris
- Songwriters: Nina Sampermans; Jean Bosco Safari; Walter Mannaerts

Placement
- Semi-final result: Failed to qualify (17th)

Participation chronology

Belgium was represented at the Eurovision Song Contest 2012 with the song "Would You?", written by Nina Sampermans, Jean Bosco Safari, and Walter Mannaerts, and performed by Iris. The Belgian participating broadcaster, Flemish Vlaamse Radio- en Televisieomroeporganisatie (VRT), selected its entry through the national final Eurosong 2012: Een song voor Iris, after having previously selected the performer internally. The national final, held on 17 March 2012, featured two songs, and "Would You?" was selected as the winning song after gaining 53% of the public televote.

Belgium was drawn to compete in the first semi-final of the Eurovision Song Contest which took place on 22 May 2012. Performing during the show in position 8, "Would You?" was not announced among the top 10 entries of the first semi-final and therefore did not qualify to compete in the final. It was later revealed that Belgium placed seventeenth out of the 18 participating countries in the semi-final with 16 points.

== Background ==
Prior to the 2012 contest, Belgium had participated in the Eurovision Song Contest fifty-three times since its debut as one of seven countries to take part in 1956. Since then, they have won the contest on one occasion in 1986 with the song "J'aime la vie", performed by Sandra Kim. Following the introduction of semi-finals for the 2004 contest, Belgium had been featured in only two finals. In 2011, "With Love Baby" performed by Witloof Bay placed eleventh in the second semi-final and failed to advance to the final.

The Belgian participation in the contest alternates between two broadcasters: Flemish Vlaamse Radio- en Televisieomroeporganisatie (VRT) and Walloon Radio-télévision belge de la Communauté française (RTBF) at the time, with both broadcasters sharing the broadcasting rights. Both broadcasters –and their predecessors– had selected the Belgian entry using national finals and internal selections in the past. In 2010, VRT internally selected the Belgian entry, while in 2011, RTBF organised a national final in order to select the entry. On 5 September 2011, VRT confirmed its participation in the 2012 contest, internally selecting the artist while holding the national final Eurosong to select the song.

== Before Eurovision ==
=== Artist selection ===
The Belgian artist for the 2012 Eurovision Song Contest was selected via an internal selection by VRT. In September 2011, the broadcaster's network manager Steve De Coninck-De Boeck revealed that the artist would be selected by the network management of Één together with a committee following conversations with artists, record labels and artist managers.

On 18 November 2011, VRT held a press conference at the Reyerslaan in Schaerbeek where they announced that they had internally selected Iris to represent Belgium at the Eurovision Song Contest 2012. Among artists that were previously rumoured to be selected for the competition included Belgian Eurovision Song Contest 2010 participant Tom Dice, Kato, Side Effects and Stan Van Samang. On 29 February 2012, the broadcaster revealed that the song Iris would perform at the contest would be selected through a two-song national selection.

=== Eurosong 2012: Een song voor Iris ===
A submission period was opened on 19 December 2011 for songwriters to submit their songs until 16 January 2012. VRT also directly invited several composers to submit songs. Two songs were selected for the national final from 270 received during the submission period and were announced on 16 March 2012. The final took place at 20:00 CET on 17 March 2012 at the Het Omroepcentrum in Brussels, hosted by Peter Van de Veire and was broadcast on Eén as well as online at the broadcaster's website een.be and the official Eurovision Song Contest website eurovision.tv. The two competing songs were both performed by Iris and the winning song was selected solely by public televoting. The broadcast lasted only 15 minutes, after which televoting continued for another 2 hours until 22:15 CET, when the results were announced during the Eén talk show Vrienden Van de Veire. The national final was watched by 575,112 viewers in Belgium with a market share of 28.39%.

Final – 17 March 2012
R/O	Song	Songwriter(s)	Televote	Place
1	"Safety Net"	Boots Ottestad, Aimée Proal, Barrett Yeretsian	47%	2
2	"Would You?"	Nina Sampermans, Jean Bosco Safari, Walter Mannaerts	53%	1

=== Promotion ===
Iris specifically promoted "Would You?" as the Belgian Eurovision entry on 21 April 2012 by performing during the Eurovision in Concert event which was held at the Melkweg venue in Amsterdam, Netherlands and hosted by Ruth Jacott and Cornald Maas.

== At Eurovision ==
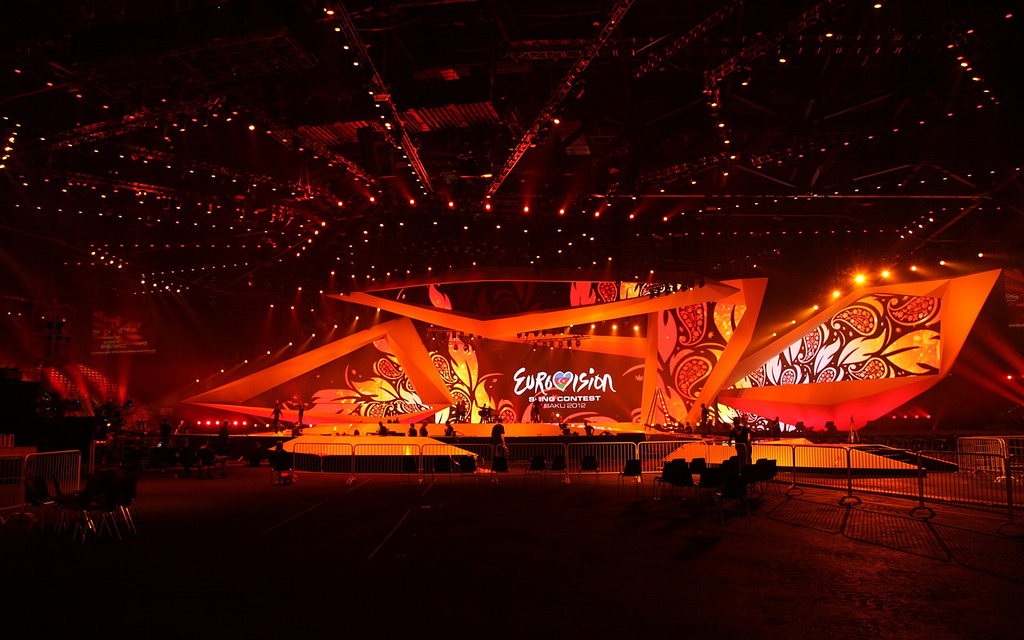
The Eurovision Song Contest 2012 took place at the Baku Crystal Hall in Baku, Azerbaijan

According to Eurovision rules, all nations with the exceptions of the host country and the "Big Five" (France, Germany, Italy, Spain and the United Kingdom) are required to qualify from one of two semi-finals in order to compete for the final; the top ten countries from each semi-final progress to the final. The European Broadcasting Union (EBU) split up the competing countries into six different pots based on voting patterns from previous contests, with countries with favourable voting histories put into the same pot. On 25 January 2012, a special allocation draw was held which placed each country into one of the two semi-finals, as well as which half of the show they would perform in. Belgium was placed into the first semi-final, to be held on 22 May 2012, and was scheduled to perform in the first half of the show. The running order for the semi-finals was decided through another draw on 20 March 2012 and Belgium was set to perform in position 8, following the entry from Switzerland and before the entry from Finland.

The two semi-finals and the final was broadcast in Belgium by both the Flemish and Walloon broadcasters. VRT broadcast the shows on één and Radio 2 with commentary in Dutch by André Vermeulen and Peter Van de Veire. RTBF televised the shows on La Une with commentary in French by Jean-Pierre Hautier and Jean-Louis Lahaye. The Belgian spokesperson, who announced the Belgian votes during the final, was Peter Van de Veire.

=== Semi-final ===
Iris took part in technical rehearsals on 13 and 17 May, followed by dress rehearsals on 21 and 22 May. This included the jury show on 21 May where the professional juries of each country watched and voted on the competing entries. The Belgian performance featured Iris in a short white dress and performing together with three backing vocalists. The stage colours were purple and blue, while the LED screens displayed floating pink bubbles in various sizes and the stage floor displayed a floral pattern in the shape of a heart at the end of the performance. The backing vocalists that joined Iris during the performance were: Billie Bentein, Jana De Valck and Joke Vincke.

At the end of the show, Belgium was not announced among the top 10 entries in the first semi-final and therefore failed to qualify to compete in the final. It was later revealed that Belgium placed seventeenth in the semi-final, receiving a total of 16 points.

=== Voting ===
Voting during the three shows consisted of 50 percent public televoting and 50 percent from a jury deliberation. The jury consisted of five music industry professionals who were citizens of the country they represent. This jury was asked to judge each contestant based on: vocal capacity; the stage performance; the song's composition and originality; and the overall impression by the act. In addition, no member of a national jury could be related in any way to any of the competing acts in such a way that they cannot vote impartially and independently.

Following the release of the full split voting by the EBU after the conclusion of the competition, it was revealed that Belgium had placed eighteenth (last) with the public televote and fifteenth with the jury vote in the first semi-final. In the public vote, Belgium scored 2 points, while with the jury vote, Belgium scored 38 points.

Below is a breakdown of points awarded to Belgium and awarded by Belgium in the first semi-final and grand final of the contest. The nation awarded its 12 points to Russia in the semi-final and to Sweden in the final of the contest.

==== Points awarded to Belgium ====
Points awarded to Belgium (Semi-final 1)
Score	Country
12 points	
10 points	
8 points	
7 points	
6 points	Ireland
5 points	
4 points	Greece
3 points	
2 points	Albania; Finland
1 point	Romania; Spain

==== Points awarded by Belgium ====
Points awarded by Belgium (Semi-final 1)
Score	Country
12 points	Russia
10 points	Albania
8 points	Greece
7 points	Ireland
6 points	Hungary
5 points	Iceland
4 points	Romania
3 points	Cyprus
2 points	Austria
1 point	Finland

Points awarded by Belgium (Final)
Score	Country
12 points	Sweden
10 points	Albania
8 points	Russia
7 points	Turkey
6 points	Spain
5 points	Serbia
4 points	Ireland
3 points	Romania
2 points	Greece
1 point	United Kingdom
