= Belgium in the Eurovision Song Contest 2011 =

- Eurovision Song Contest 2011
- Participating broadcaster: Radio-télévision belge de la Communauté française (RTBF)
- Country: Belgium
- Selection process: Eurovision 2011: Qui ? A vous de choisir !
- Selection date: 12 February 2011

Competing entry
- Song: "With Love Baby"
- Artist: Witloof Bay
- Songwriters: RoxorLoops; Benoît Giaux

Placement
- Semi-final result: Failed to qualify (11th)

Participation chronology

Belgium was represented at the Eurovision Song Contest 2011 with the song "With Love Baby", written by RoxorLoops and Benoît Giaux, and performed by the group Witloof Bay. The Belgian participating broadcaster, Walloon Radio-télévision belge de la Communauté française (RTBF), selected its entry for the contest through the national final Eurovision 2011: Qui ? A vous de choisir !. The competition featured thirty competing entries and consisted of two shows. In the final on 30 January 2011, "With Love Baby" performed by Witloof Bay was selected as the winner via the votes of a four-member jury panel and a public televote.

Belgium was drawn to compete in the second semi-final of the Eurovision Song Contest which took place on 12 May 2011. Performing during the show in position 4, "With Love Baby" was not announced among the top 10 entries of the second semi-final and therefore did not qualify to compete in the final. It was later revealed that Belgium placed eleventh out of the 19 participating countries in the semi-final with 53 points.

== Background ==
Prior to the 2011 contest, Belgium had participated in the Eurovision Song Contest fifty-two times since its debut as one of seven countries to take part in 1956. Since then, the country has won the contest on one occasion in 1986 with the song "J'aime la vie" performed by Sandra Kim. Following the introduction of semi-finals for the 2004 contest, Belgium had been featured in only two finals. In 2010, the song "Me and My Guitar" by Tom Dice, qualified to the final and placed sixth—Belgium's best result in the contest since placing second in 2003.

The Belgian participation in the contest alternates between two broadcasters: Flemish Vlaamse Radio- en Televisieomroeporganisatie (VRT) and Walloon Radio-télévision belge de la Communauté française (RTBF) at the time, with both broadcasters sharing the broadcasting rights. Both broadcasters –and their predecessors– have selected the Belgian entry using national finals and internal selections in the past. In 2009 and 2010, both VRT and RTBF internally selected the Belgian entry. On 27 August 2010, RTBF confirmed its participation in the 2011 contest and announced that a national final would be held to select its entry.

== Before Eurovision ==
=== Eurovision 2011: Qui? A vous de choisir! ===
Eurovision 2011: Qui? A vous de choisir! was the national final that selected Belgium's entry in the Eurovision Song Contest 2011. The competition consisted of a semi-final that took place on 30 January 2011 followed by a final on 12 February 2011 where the winning song and artist were selected. The semi-final was broadcast via radio on VivaCité as well as online at the broadcaster's website rtbf.be, while the final was broadcast on La Une as well as online at rtbf.be.

==== Format ====
Eurovision 2011: Qui? A vous de choisir! included two stages. The first stage took place between 20 September 2010 and 31 December 2010 where interested artists had the opportunity to submit their entries through an online platform launched by RTBF and music company Akamusic and have them listed for public listening. Users were able to give financial support to their favourite song through a donation system by giving at least €5 per bid, and all entries that managed to raise €20,000 qualified to the next phase of the national final. A semi-final took place on 30 January 2011 where the thirty entries that qualified from the first stage were featured and the top fourteen as determined by an expert jury and public televoting qualified to the final. Both the jury and televote awarded points in the following manner: 1–12, 14 and 16. The final took place on 12 February 2011 where the winner was chosen by an expert jury and public televoting. Both the jury and televote awarded points in the following manner: 1–8, 10 and 12.

==== Competing entries ====
A submission period was opened on 20 September 2010 for artists and songwriters to upload their entries on the Akamusic website until 31 December 2010. Both artists and composers were required to be Belgian or have resided in Belgium for three years, while songs were required to be performed in English and/or French. 3,181 producers together invested €697,015 for the entries received during the submission period, and 33 entries managed to raise the necessary amount of €20,000 by the closing of the 31 December deadline and were selected for the competition. However, three of the entries which managed to raise €20,000 were disqualified from the national final: "Tant qu'il y aura des femmes" performed by Lorenzo Caminotti, "United Belgium" performed by Thooom, and "Manipulation" performed by Paul Biss.

At least 198 entries were received, however it is unknown how many songs were submitted in total. Many online sources claim that there were 195 submissions but this is in fact the total number of songs left on the Akamusic website by the end of the submission period. Artists were able to withdraw their songs after uploading them to the site and some songs were also disqualified during the bidding period, thus the three songs which raised €20,000 but were disqualified would not be included in the supposed submission total of 195.

Artist	Song	Songwriter(s)
.fen	"Yes I Know"	Juan Fernandez, Thierry Bantuelle, Philippe Thibaut, Sandro Giovinazzo, Gianbruno Carrari
2Days Ticket	"A Journey Inside Me"	Marc Ysaÿe
Alexandre Deschamps	"Elle merveille"	Alexandre Deschamps
Bellyve	"Nos pages, nos images"	Raphael Umka, Pat Higny, Thierry Vingre
Chloé	"Just One Chance"	Chloé Ditlefsen, Paul Curtiz, Chris Lambrechts
Clac et les Portes	"Claquer les portes"	Thierry Noesen, Mathilde Bosquillon de Jenlis, Vincent Ansaldi, Xavier Dawant, Grégory Lambot, Diego Noesen
Etienne Deleyre	"The Way You Are"	Etienne Deleyre
Françoise Norroy	"Je vis comme une chanson"	Françoise Norroy, Hersegovie
Gautier Reyz	"Addiction"	Gautier Reyz
Hanny-D	"Près de toi"	Isabelle Maes
Harley	"Pardonne moi"	Bruno Bocquillon
Hélène	"Our Home"	Hélène, André Ola
J COOL	"Dans ma chanson"	J COOL
Joe Galli	"Live My Life"	Silvio Pezzuto
Joyce and Jay	"Do You Remember"	Charlie Joyce, Jaimy Jay
Kaptain Oats	"Reset"	Guillaume Vermeire, Thomas Vermeire
Léa Clément	"Où s'en vont nos rêves?"	Christine Sion, Patrick van Roy
~~Lorenzo Caminotti~~	~~"Tant qu'il y aura des femmes"~~	~~Lorenzo Caminotti, Didier Concas, David Caruso~~
Maël	"L'ancre de nos vies"	Maël, Timofey Reznikov
Natohé	"For You"	Michel Beckers, Noémie Beckers
NellSonn!	"Commence par un pas"	Nathalie Delattre, Véronique Sonneville
Nelza	"Be My Friend"	Tefta Ametaille-Schaller
~~Paul Biss~~	~~"Manipulation"~~	~~Paul Biss, Ket Hagaha~~
Sarina Cohn	"Rien en apparence"	Sarina Cohn
Steve Linden	"C'est la musique"	Fabian Vanderlinden, Sabine Cardinal
Swing Channel	"Les pieds dans l'eau"	Virginie Delzenne, Florent Federico, Guibert Boone, Antoine Olivier
Syla K.	"Simple Love"	Isabelle Maes
Thayss N' Bau	"Somewhere With You"	Alain Bau
The Blazing	"Our Way"	Vincent Lemineur, Geoffrey Jamart, Jessica Bof, Sophie Hallet
The MichelJanssens	"Fais comme ci"	The MichelJanssens
~~Thooom~~	~~"United Belgium"~~	~~Thomas Rocquerelle~~
Tommy Waters	"I'm Alive"	Tom Lamens
Witloof Bay	"With Love Baby"	RoxorLoops, Benoît Giaux

==== Semi-final ====
The semi-final took place on 30 January 2011 at the VivaCité studios in Brussels, hosted by Jean-Louis Lahaye. In the show thirty entries competed and the combination of results from an expert jury and a public televote determined the top fourteen that qualified to the final.

Semi-final – 30 January 2011
R/O	Artist	Song	Jury	Televote	Total	Place
1	Clac et les Portes	"Claquer les portes"	7	3	10	11
2	Thayss N' Bau	"Somewhere With You"	16	0	16	5
3	Hanny-D	"Près de Toi"	0	0	0	21
4	Hélène	"Our Home"	0	0	0	21
5	Natohé	"For You"	0	0	0	21
6	.fen	"Yes I Know"	8	5	13	8
7	Chloé	"Just One Chance"	10	11	21	2
8	Harley	"Pardonne moi"	0	0	0	21
9	J COOL	"Dans ma chanson"	5	8	13	7
10	Françoise Norroy	"Je vis comme une chanson"	0	0	0	21
11	Alexandre Deschamps	"Elle merveille"	4	16	20	3
12	Joe Galli	"Live My Life"	0	0	0	21
13	The MichelJanssens	"Fais comme ci"	0	0	0	21
14	Etienne Deleyre	"The Way You Are"	1	0	1	20
15	Kaptain Oats	"Reset"	3	6	9	13
16	Nelza	"Be My Friend"	12	0	12	9
17	Tommy Waters	"I'm Alive"	0	7	7	15
18	Syla K.	"Simple Love"	14	2	16	4
19	2Days Ticket	"A Journey Inside Me"	2	0	2	18
20	Maël	"L'ancre de nos vies"	6	0	6	16
21	The Blazing	"Our Way"	0	14	14	6
22	NellSonn!	"Commence par un pas"	0	0	0	21
23	Gautier Reyz	"Addiction"	9	0	9	14
24	Witloof Bay	"With Love Baby"	11	12	23	1
25	Joyce and Jay	"Do You Remember"	0	1	1	19
26	Swing Channel	"Les pieds dans l'eau"	0	0	0	21
27	Steve Linden	"C'est la musique"	0	10	10	10
28	Léa Clément	"Où s'en vont nos rêves?"	0	0	0	21
29	Bellyve	"Nos pages, nos images"	0	4	4	17
30	Sarina Cohn	"Rien en apparence"	0	9	9	12

==== Final ====
The final took place on 12 February 2011 at the Palais des Congrès in Liège, hosted by Jean-Louis Lahaye with Maureen Louys reporting from the green room. The running order was determined by RTBF and announced on 3 February 2011. The fourteen entries that qualified from the preceding semi-final competed and the winner, "With Love Baby" performed by Witloof Bay, was selected by the combination of results from an expert jury and a public televote. 55,000 televotes were received, while the jury consisted of Sandra Kim (winner of the Eurovision Song Contest 1986 for Belgium), Viktor Lazlo (singer, host of the Eurovision Song Contest 1987), Jean-Pierre Hautier (television and radio presenter, Belgian commentator at the Eurovision Song Contest) and Charles Gardier (Francofolies de Spa artistic director).

Final – 12 February 2011
R/O	Artist	Song	Jury	Televote	Total	Place
1	Steve Linden	"C'est la musique"	5	5	10	5
2	Nelza	"Be My Friend"	7	0	7	6
3	Sarina Cohn	"Rien en apparence"	10	8	18	2
4	Thayss N' Bau	"Somewhere With You"	0	0	0	14
5	Clac et les Portes	"Claquer les portes"	6	1	7	6
6	Chloé	"Just One Chance"	0	4	4	10
7	J Cool	"Dans ma chanson"	0	3	3	12
8	Gautier Reyz	"Addiction"	4	0	4	10
9	.fen	"Yes I Know"	8	7	15	3
10	Witloof Bay	"With Love Baby"	12	12	24	1
11	Alexandre Deschamps	"Elle merveille"	1	10	11	4
12	Syla K.	"Simple Love"	2	0	2	13
13	Kaptain Oats	"Reset"	3	2	5	9
14	The Blazing	"Our Way"	0	6	6	8

Detailed Jury Votes
R/O	Song	S. Kim	J. Hautier	V. Lazlo	C. Gardier	Points
1	"C'est la musique"	✓	✓	✗	✗	5
2	"Be My Friend"	✗	✓	✓	✓	7
3	"Rien en apparence"	✗	✓	✗	✓	10
4	"Somewhere With You"	✗	✗	✗	✗	0
5	"Claquer les portes"	✓	✓	✗	✗	6
6	"Just One Chance"	✗	✗	✗	✗	0
7	"Dans ma chanson"	✗	✗	✗	✗	0
8	"Addiction"	✓	✗	✓	✗	4
9	"Yes I Know"	✓	✗	✓	✓	8
10	"With Love Baby"	✓	✓	✓	✓	12
11	"Elle merveille"	✗	✗	✗	✗	1
12	"Simple Love"	✓	✓	✗	✗	2
13	"Reset"	✗	✗	✓	✓	3
14	"Our Way"	✗	✗	✗	✗	0

== At Eurovision ==
All countries except the "Big Five" (France, Germany, Italy, Spain and the United Kingdom), and the host country, are required to qualify from one of two semi-finals in order to compete for the final; the top ten countries from each semi-final progress to the final. The European Broadcasting Union (EBU) split up the competing countries into six different pots based on voting patterns from previous contests, with countries with favourable voting histories put into the same pot. On 17 January 2011, a special allocation draw was held which placed each country into one of the two semi-finals, as well as which half of the show they would perform in. Belgium was placed into the second semi-final, to be held on 12 May 2011, and was scheduled to perform in the first half of the show. The running order for the semi-finals was decided through another draw on 15 March 2011 and Belgium was set to perform in position 4, following the entry from the Netherlands and before the entry from Slovakia.

The two semi-finals and the final was broadcast in Belgium by both the Flemish and Walloon broadcasters. VRT broadcast the shows on één and Radio 2 with commentary in Dutch by Sven Pichal and André Vermeulen. RTBF televised the shows on La Une with commentary in French by Jean-Pierre Hautier and Jean-Louis Lahaye; the first semi-final aired on a 20-minute delay on La Une. The Belgian spokesperson, who announced the Belgian votes during the final, was Maureen Louys.

=== Semi-final ===
Witloof Bay took part in technical rehearsals on 3 and 6 May, followed by dress rehearsals on 9 and 10 May. This included the jury show on 9 May where the professional juries of each country watched and voted on the competing entries. The Belgian performance featured the members of Witloof Bay dressed in outfits of several colours; the female members were in short dresses and the male members were in suits. The group performed a choreographed routine which included forming circles and splitting up, and was concluded with the members standing side by side together. The stage colours were dark and the LED screens and stage floor displayed flashing white sticks.

At the end of the show, Belgium was not announced among the top 10 entries in the second semi-final and therefore failed to qualify to compete in the final. It was later revealed that Belgium placed eleventh in the semi-final, receiving a total of 53 points.

=== Voting ===
Voting during the three shows consisted of 50 percent public televoting and 50 percent from a jury deliberation. The jury consisted of five music industry professionals who were citizens of the country they represent. This jury was asked to judge each contestant based on: vocal capacity; the stage performance; the song's composition and originality; and the overall impression by the act. In addition, no member of a national jury could be related in any way to any of the competing acts in such a way that they cannot vote impartially and independently.

Following the release of the full split voting by the EBU after the conclusion of the competition, it was revealed that Belgium had placed twelfth with the public televote and eighth with the jury vote in the second semi-final. In the public vote, Belgium scored 50 points, while with the jury vote, Belgium scored 71 points.

Below is a breakdown of points awarded to Belgium and awarded by Belgium in the second semi-final and grand final of the contest. The nation awarded its 12 points to Sweden in the semi-final and to France in the final of the contest.

==== Points awarded to Belgium ====
Points awarded to Belgium (Semi-final 2)
Score	Country
12 points	
10 points	
8 points	Bosnia and Herzegovina; Romania
7 points	
6 points	Bulgaria; France; Moldova; Netherlands
5 points	
4 points	
3 points	Latvia
2 points	Cyprus; Israel; Italy; Slovenia
1 point	Austria; Estonia

==== Points awarded by Belgium ====
Points awarded by Belgium (Semi-final 2)
Score	Country
12 points	Sweden
10 points	Romania
8 points	Netherlands
7 points	Denmark
6 points	Estonia
5 points	Ireland
4 points	Bosnia and Herzegovina
3 points	Slovakia
2 points	Israel
1 point	Bulgaria

Points awarded by Belgium (Final)
Score	Country
12 points	France
10 points	Romania
8 points	Greece
7 points	Ireland
6 points	Italy
5 points	Germany
4 points	Sweden
3 points	Azerbaijan
2 points	Estonia
1 point	Moldova
