= Blaxy Girls =

Romanian rock band

- Origin: Constanţa, Romania
- Genres: Rock, alternative rock, pop rock, power pop, pop punk, synthpop, punk rock (early)
- Years active: 2007–2014
- Label: Roton
- Members: Rucsandra Iliescu; Anamaria Nanu; Diana Ganea; Gela Marinescu; Cristina Marinescu
- Past members: Amalia Tirca

Blaxy Girls was a Romanian all-girl rock band from Constanta, formed in 2007. The band consisted of lead singer Rucsandra Iliescu, Cristina Marinescu, Diana Ganea, Ana Maria Nanu and Gela Marinescu.

The group's first single, "If You Feel My Love" quickly became very popular in Romania. Their second great hit was "Dear Mama". The clip was internationally released in the beginning of March, as a present for the women and mothers all around the world. The first album of the group was released in December 2008.

They appeared in the semi-finals of the 2008 Golden Stag Festival and were among the finalists for the 2009 Romanian Eurovision Song Contest, with the song "Dear Mama" finishing in a tie for second place.

They planned to compete in the national selection of Romania for the Eurovision Song Contest 2010 with the song "Save the World" but later withdrew.

The group officially disbanded in 2014, after a 7-year long career.

== Discography ==
=== Studio albums ===
Year	Album details	Peak chart positions
Year	Album details	RO
2008	If You Feel My Love: Released: June 23, 2008; Format: CD, digital download; Label: Roton	1

== Band members ==
- Rucsandra Iliescu – lead vocals, guitar (2007–2014)
- Amalia Tirca – lead guitar, backing vocals (2007–2012)
- Diana Ganea – lead guitar, backing vocals (2012–2014)
- Cristina Marinescu – bass, backing vocals, guitar (2007–2014)
- Gela Marinescu – drums, percussion, backing vocals (2007–2014)
- Anamaria Nanu – keyboards, backing vocals (2007–2014)
