= My Cassette Player =

Studio album by Lena
- Released: 7 May 2010
- Recorded: March–April 2010
- Length: 42:32
- Label: Universal Music Germany
- Producers: André "Brix" Buchmann; John Gordon; Per Kristian Ottestad; Ingo Politz; Stefan Raab; Bernd Wendlandt

Lena chronology
My Cassette Player (2010)	Good News (2011)

Singles from My Cassette Player
- 1. "Satellite" Released: 13 March 2010; 2. "Touch a New Day" Released: 6 August 2010

My Cassette Player is the debut studio album by the German singer Lena Meyer-Landrut. It was released by Universal Music Germany on 7 May 2010 in German-speaking Europe. After winning Unser Song für Oslo, the German final for the Eurovision Song Contest 2010, Meyer-Landrut began work on her debut album, with entertainer Stefan Raab producing and co-writing most of the material. Several songs which she had recorded during the national finals, including winning entry "Satellite," were also included.

The album earned largely mixed reviews but was released to major commercial success. It debuted at number one on the German Albums Chart and also peaked atop the charts in Austria. Following its international release and Meyer-Landrut's triumph at the Eurovision Song Contest, My Cassette Player also reached the top five in Greece, Sweden, and Switzerland. One of the five biggest-selling albums of the year in Germany, it was certified 5× Gold by the Bundesverband Musikindustrie (BVMI) in 2011.

== Production ==
My Cassette Player was chiefly produced by entertainer and Unser Song für Oslo jury member Stefan Raab, while Meyer-Landrut co-wrote five songs from the final track listing. The album includes her number-one single "Satellite," Germany's winning entry at the Eurovision Song Contest 2010, as well as her songs "Love Me" and "Bee", which had been released previously on 13 March 2010. It also features cover versions of "My Same" by English singer Adele, "Mr. Curiosity" by American singer Jason Mraz, and "New Shoes" by Scottish singer Paolo Nutini, all of which had been performed by Meyer-Landrut during Unser Star für Oslo. The cover photo was created by Sophie Krische and depicts the singer sitting near a SKR 700. The artwork of the album booklet was done by Ronald Reinsberg.

== Critical reception ==
Professional ratings
Review scores
Source	Rating
Aftonbladet	2/5 stars
Expressen	1/5 stars
Laut.de	3/5 stars
LetMeEntertainYou	3/5 stars
MuzObzor	5/5 stars
Nerikes Allehanda	1/5 stars
Nya Wermlands-Tidningen	1/5 stars

In Germany, initial reviews of the album were mixed. While Gunther Reinhardt from Stuttgarter Nachrichten criticised the overly distinct influence of producer Stefan Raab, Neue Presse's Matthias Halbig deemed it a "charming debut," and Gerd Schild from Hannoversche Allgemeine called it "somewhat banal" but still a "good pop album," characterising "Bee" as a "cheerful hymn to independence" and "Satellite" as "still sounding astonishingly fresh, even after its massive airplay." Michael Schuh, writing for Laut.de, found that "for an instant pop album with pre-written numbers, Lena does a pretty good job." He noted that My Cassette Player was "certainly more pleasant than anything from Silbermond or Ich + Ich and perhaps a little more infectious than Max Mutzke albums." Tagesspiegel critic Nadine Lange felt that "Lena's accent contributes significantly to the international feel of My Cassette Player. However, it is evoked even more strongly by the solid songwriting and the pleasing arrangements. When a spacey keyboard joins the slap bass in I like to hang my head or the acoustic guitars complement each other like Jack Johnson in "Wonderful Dreaming," it's simply nice, contemporary consensus pop."

In foreign press, the album was critically panned with a number of reviews blaming nonsensical lyrics and Meyer-Landrut's "weak voice." In Sweden, the website Kritiker assigned a normalised rating out of 5.0 to reviews from mainstream critics across the country and gave the album an average score of 2.0, based on 13 reviews, which indicates negative to mixed reviews. Jenny Seth of Aftonbladet accused Meyer-Landrut of being "a precocious teenager" with "forced vocals [and] banal lyrics about bees." She added that, whilst Meyer-Landrut "is influenced by Kate Nash and Adele, she sounds rather [like a] wimpy Colbie Caillat and Jason Mraz's unbearably perky little sister." Anders Nunstedt, music editor from the Swedish tabloid Expressen, gave the album a harsh review calling it a "bland pop debut with nonsense lyrics" and criticising the singer's "exaggerated British accent." Carina Jonsson in Nerikes Allehanda gave the album only one out of five and criticised Meyer-Landrut's vocal ability, saying she "sings as bad as any karaoke rookie, also, she has added a hard-won goofy English accent." AllMusic editor Jason Birchmeier called My Cassette Player a "relatively straightforward pop album that doesn't rely on the novelty appeal of most Eurovision debut efforts. The style of the album seems to be modeled after one of Lena's favorite contemporary artists, British pop star Kate Nash."

== Chart performance ==
Released only a few weeks ahead of the Eurovision Song Contest 2010, My Cassette Player debuted at number one the German Albums Chart in the week of 21 May 2010. It would spend four non-consecutive weeks at the top of the chart and further twelve weeks inside the top ten. The fifth biggest-selling album of the year in Germany only after Unheilig's Große Freiheit (2010), Peter Maffay's Tattoos (2010), Lady Gaga's The Fame (2008), and Ich + Ich's Gute Reise (2009), in 2011, the album was certified 5× Gold by the Bundesverband Musikindustrie (BVMI) for shipment figures in excess of 500,000 copies.

== Track listing ==
My Cassette Player track listing
No.	Title	Writer(s)	Producer(s)	Length
1.	"Satellite"	Julie Frost; John Gordon	André "Brix" Buchmann; Gordon; Ingo Politz; Bernd Wendlandt	2:55
2.	"My Cassette Player"	Lena Meyer-Landrut; Stefan Raab	Raab	3:35
3.	"Not Following"	Ellie Goulding; Jonny Lattimer	Raab	3:36
4.	"I Like to Bang My Head"	Meyer-Landrut; Raab	Raab	3:23
5.	"My Same"	Adele	Raab	3:02
6.	"Caterpillar in the Rain"	Meyer-Landrut; Raab	Raab	3:42
7.	"Love Me"	Meyer-Landrut; Raab	Raab	2:59
8.	"Touch a New Day"	Raab	Raab	3:08
9.	"Bee"	Rosi Golan; Per Kristian Ottestad; Mayaeni Strauss	Ottestad	3:00
10.	"You Can't Stop Me"	Raab	Raab	2:54
11.	"Mr. Curiosity"	Lester Mendez; Dennis James Morris; Jason Mraz	Raab	3:41
12.	"I Just Want Your Kiss"	Daniel Schaub; Pär Lammers; Raab	Raab	3:05
13.	"Wonderful Dreaming"	Meyer-Landrut; Raab	Raab	3:32
Total length:				42:32

Platinum edition – bonus tracks
No.	Title	Writer(s)	Producer(s)	Length
14.	"We Can't Go On"	Lammers; Schaub	Raab	3:15
15.	"New Shoes"	Matty Benbrook; Jim Duguid; Paolo Nutini	Raab	3:23
16.	"Das Wunder von Oslo" (documentary)			23:00
17.	"Satellite" (music video)			2:54
18.	"Touch a New Day" (music video)			3:08

Tchibo deluxe edition bonus DVD
No.	Title	Length
1.	"Satellite" (Live at Unser Star für Oslo)	3:01
2.	"Love Me" (Live at Unser Star für Oslo)	3:09
3.	"Bee" (Live at Unser Star für Oslo)	3:30
4.	"My Same" (Live at Unser Star für Oslo)	3:39
5.	"Mr. Curiosity" (Live at Unser Star für Oslo)	3:32
6.	"Photo gallery ("Satellite")"	2:54

Notes

- "My Same" is a cover version of English singer Adele's same-titled 2008 song.
- "Mr. Curiosity" is a cover version of American singer Jason Mraz's same-titled 2005 song.
- "New Shoes" is a cover version of Scottish singer Paolo Nutini's same-titled 2007 song.

== Personnel ==
Credits adapted from the album's booklet.

Performers and musicians

- Thorsten Brötzmann – keyboards
- Axel Grube – bass
- Jan Löchel – additional vocals
- Kayna – additional vocals
- Michael Knauer – keyboards
- Christoph Leis-Bendorf –additional vocals
- Lena Meyer-Landrut – Lead vocals
- Peter Weihe – guitar

Technical

- André "Brix" Buchmann – production
- Sascha "Busy" Bühren – mastering
- John Gordon – production
- Jeo@Jeopark – mastering
- Per Kristian "Boots" Ottestad – production
- Ingo Politz – production
- Stefan Raab – production
- Michael Schwabe – mastering
- Bernd Wendtland – production

Imagery

- Sophie Krische – photos
- Ronald Reinsberg – artwork

== Charts ==
=== Weekly charts ===
Weekly chart performance for My Cassette Player
Chart (2010)	Peak position
Austrian Albums (Ö3 Austria)	1
Belgian Albums (Ultratop Flanders)	54
Danish Albums (Hitlisten)	40
Finnish Albums (Suomen virallinen lista)	43
German Albums (Offizielle Top 100)	1
Greek Albums (IFPI)	4
Norwegian Albums (VG-lista)	7
Polish Albums (ZPAV)	45
Swedish Albums (Sverigetopplistan)	5
Swiss Albums (Schweizer Hitparade)	3

=== Year-end charts ===
Year-end chart performance for My Cassette Player
Chart (2010)	Position
Austrian Albums (Ö3 Austria)	39
German Albums (Offizielle Top 100)	5
Swiss Albums (Schweizer Hitparade)	24

== Certifications ==
Certifications for My Cassette Player
Region	Certification	Certified units/sales
Germany (BVMI)	5× Gold	500,000^{^}
^{^} Shipments figures based on certification alone.

== Release history ==
My Cassette Player release history
Region	Date	Edition(s)	Format(s)	Label	Ref.
Various	7 May 2010	Standard; deluxe; Tchibo	CD; digital download	Universal Music Germany	
Various	26 November 2010	Platinum	CD; digital download	Universal Music Germany	
