= Uwu Lena =

German pop group

- Origin: Münster
- Genres: Pop
- Years active: 2010
- Labels: Universal
- Members: Christian Landgraf; Timo Buehring; Nikolai Gaschütz; Sören Glück; John Jötten; Robert Krotoszynski; Matthias Landgraf; Moritz Schefers
- Website: "www.schlandrut.de". Archived from the original on October 10, 2010.

Uwu Lena is a German pop group which consists of eight members from Münster. During the 2010 FIFA World Cup, Uwu Lena covered Lena Meyer-Landrut's version of the winning song of the Eurovision Song Contest 2010, "Satellite", written by American songwriter Julie Frost and Danish songwriter John Gordon. They called the German language cover version "Schland o Schland".

== History of the band ==
The name of the pop group, "Uwu Lena" is a combination of Uwe Seeler, Vuvuzela and Lena. The band consisted of students from Münster. Besides Christian Landgraf, the writer of Schland o Schland, the band comprised Timo Buehring, Nikolai Gaschütz, Sören Glück, Jötten John, Robert Krotoszynski, Matthias Landgraf and Moritz Schefers. Before the publication of "Schland o Schland" the band had also sung together, but not in the intention to commercialize their songs. The publication of the music, just before the World Cup 2010 was, due to Johannes Jötten, coincidental, because the song was only considered to be destined for their friends and acquaintances. Following the publication of Schland o Schland by Universal Music the band appeared on several events and television programs, including the ZDF Fernsehgarten on June 20, 2010.

== Discography ==
- Schland o Schland (single) 2010 (Universal B003S9W698)
