= Satellite (Lena Meyer-Landrut song) =

2010 single by Lena Meyer-Landrut

Single by Lena Meyer-Landrut

from the album My Cassette Player
- B-side: "Love Me"; "Bee"
- Released: 13 March 2010
- Recorded: 2010
- Genre: Pop
- Length: 2:54
- Label: USFO; Universal Music Germany
- Songwriters: Julie Frost; John Gordon
- Producers: Brix; Ingo Politz; Bernd Wendlandt; John Gordon

Lena Meyer-Landrut singles chronology
"Satellite" (2010)	"Touch a New Day" (2010)

Music video
- "Satellite" on YouTube

Audio sample
- file; help

Eurovision Song Contest 2010 entry
- Country: Germany
- Artist: Lena Meyer-Landrut
- As: Lena
- Language: English

Finals performance
- Final result: 1st
- Final points: 246

Entry chronology
- ◄ "Miss Kiss Kiss Bang" (2009)
- "Taken by a Stranger" (2011) ►

Official performance video
- "Satellite" (Final) on YouTube

"Satellite" is a song by German singer Lena Meyer-Landrut. It was written by American songwriter Julie Frost and Danish songwriter John Gordon and recorded by Meyer-Landrut for Unser Star für Oslo, the German pre-selection show for the Eurovision Song Contest 2010. An uptempo bubbly three-chord song, the lyrics of "Satellite" deal with unconditional love. One out of three songs which Meyer-Landrut presented during the pre-selection final, her version of the song was chosen via televoting on 12 March 2010.

It was made available for digital download the following day, becoming Germany's fastest selling digital release ever. The following week, "Satellite" debuted at number one on the German Singles Chart and has since been certified double platinum. On 29 May 2010, it won the Eurovision Song Contest 2010 in Oslo, scoring 246 points. Following its Eurovision victory, "Satellite" went on to be a commercial success across Europe, topping the single charts in six countries and receiving a number of Gold and Platinum certifications. It was later included on Meyer-Landrut's debut album My Cassette Player (2010).

== Background ==
"Satellite" is a pop song written by American songwriter Julie Frost and Danish songwriter John Gordon. Not specifically written for the Eurovision Song Contest, much of it was penned in 2007 when Frost was staying in Georgia. To finish the song, she sent her guitar track to Denmark where her frequent collaborator Gordon produced a demo based on her ideas. A couple of years later Gordon's publisher Iceberg Publishing decided to send the song to Valicon, a large German production company, and producer André "Brix" Buchmann, who then submitted it for consideration to Universal Music Germany. The song was one of approximately 300 titles for the talent show Unser Star für Oslo, a newly created national television programme to select the German entry for the Eurovision Song Contest 2010.

"Satellite" – alongside "Bee", "Love Me" and fellow contestant Jennifer Braun's "I Care for You" – was eventually chosen as one of four songs to be performed in the final of Unser Star für Oslo on 12 March 2010. While Meyer-Landrut performed an uptempo version of the song, it was re-arranged for Braun who sung a ballad version of "Satellite". Through televoting, the audience chose "Satellite" to be Meyer-Landrut's designated song in case she won the show. In a second round of voting, Meyer-Landrut with "Satellite" was picked as Germany's entry for the 55th Eurovision Song Contest. Her subsequent recording of "Satellite" was produced by John Gordon, André "Brix" Buchmann, Ingo Politz and Bernd Wendtland and remastered by Sascha "Busy" Bühren.

== Composition ==
Frost told HitQuarters that the song is about "unconditional love." The lyrics describe the thoughts of a woman in love ("I got it bad for you"), who is frustrated at being ignored ("I went everywhere for you/ I even did my hair for you/ I bought new underwear they're blue/ And I wore it just the other day.") and compares herself to a lonely traveller ("Like a satellite I'm in orbit all the way around you/ And I would fall out into the night/ Can't go a minute without your love."), but on the other hand seems to draw a kind of masochistic pleasure from her pain. Gordon called "Satellite" a "bubbly" song, "pretty easy and sweet with cheerful lyrics" and "three chords." Frost further explained: "It deals with all the crazy hidden things a girl does and feels when she is in love. A man can make her feel everything at once, joyful but also tormented and helpless."

== Release ==
On 13 March 2010, the day after Unser Star für Oslo, all six songs performed in the final were made available for digital download. The maxi single of Meyer-Landrut's "Satellite," which also includes her other two songs from the final, "Bee" and "Love Me", was released three days later on 16 March 2010. All songs were released on the specially created record label USFO, a cooperation between Universal Music Germany and Raab TV/Brainpool, the production companies of Unser Star für Oslo.

"Satellite" sold over 100,000 downloads in its first week, becoming Germany's fastest selling digital release ever. It debuted at number one on the German Singles Chart, and was eligible to be certified gold by the Bundesverband Musikindustrie (BVMI) after the first week and platinum after the fourth week of its release. The song remained at number one for five consecutive weeks in Germany. After winning the Eurovision Song Contest on 29 May 2010, "Satellite" regained its top position in Germany for one week and also peaked at number one in Denmark, Finland, Norway, Sweden and Switzerland. It also topped Billboard's European Hot 100 singles chart, being the first Eurovision song to achieve this. In November 2010, Gfk Entertainment reported that with 464,000 downloads sold, "Satellite" was the second-best selling download single in Germany since 2006, when such records began being kept – only behind Lady Gaga's "Poker Face", which was downloaded more than 500,000 times.

== Music video ==
A music video for "Satellite" was shot during the night of the final on the television stage of Unser Star für Oslo in Cologne and directed by Frank Paul Husmann ad Manfred Winkens. It features no story line or any change of scenery, but instead focuses entirely on Meyer-Landrut as she sings and dances on a darkened stage with some spotlights behind her. On 16 March 2010, the video premiered on public broadcaster Das Erste right before Germany's most-watched evening news bulletin Tagesschau. Shortly after, it was simultaneously shown on four private stations –( Sat.1, ProSieben, kabel eins, N24)´ before the start of their evening prime time programmes. By August 2025, the video reached 75 million views on YouTube.

== Eurovision Song Contest ==
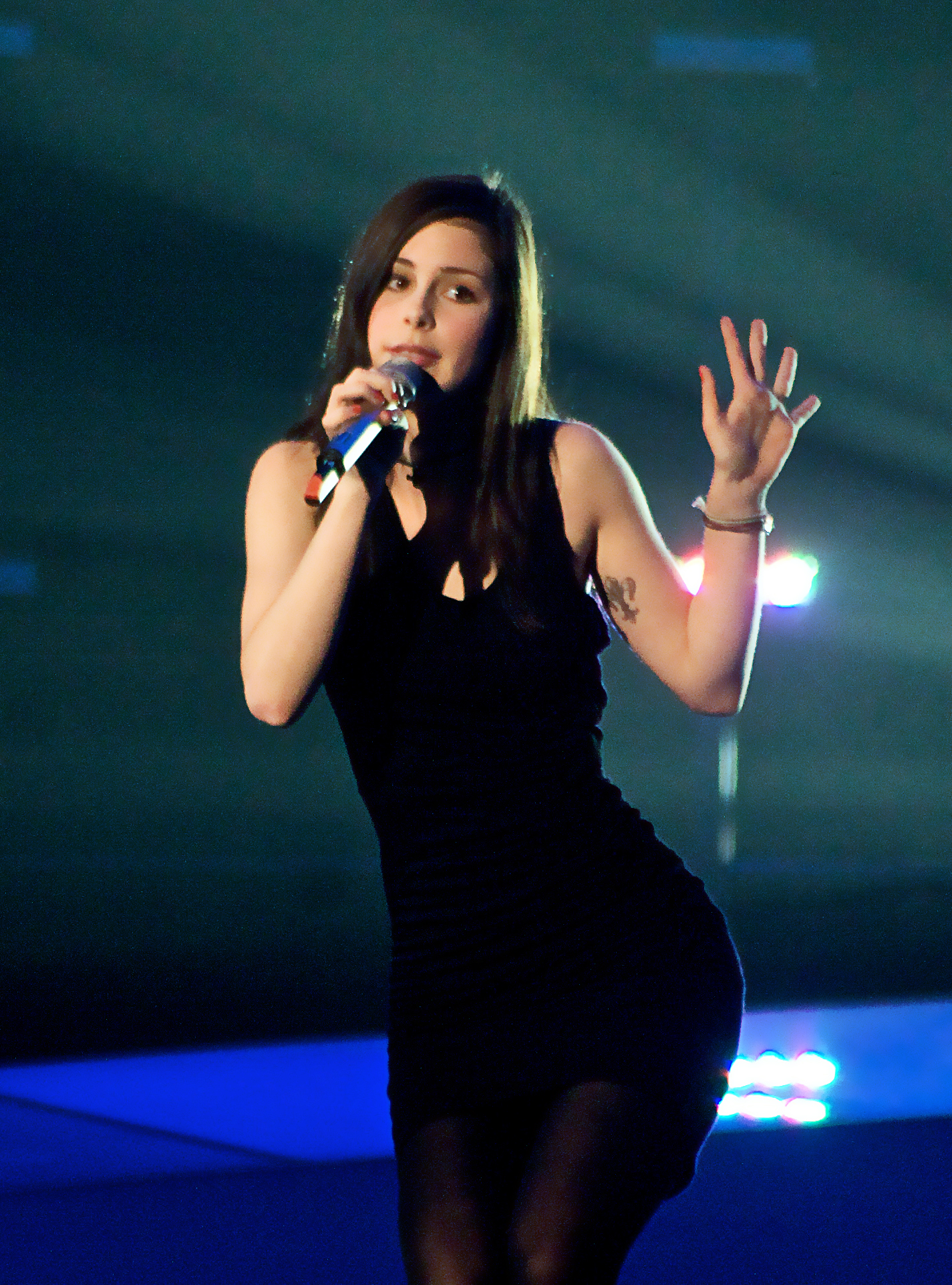
Lena at Telenor Arena during Eurovision rehearsals.

"Satellite" was Germany's entry for the Eurovision Song Contest 2010. By representing a "Big Four" country, it was automatically qualified for the final. Germany received a wild card during the running order draw, which allowed the German representatives to pick the country's position for the final. They chose position 22 out of the 25 spots. Meyer-Landrut arrived one week before the show in Oslo, Norway, where she completed five rehearsals of "Satellite". Prior to the final, the song was considered as one of the favourites. Bookmakers regarded it second favourite behind Azerbaijan's "Drip Drop", while Google projected it would win based on search volume in the participating countries. According to Norway's Aftenposten, Meyer-Landrut received the most attention of all participants.

The final was held on 29 May 2010 at Oslo's Telenor Arena. Appearing fourth from last, Meyer-Landrut wore a simple black dress and performed on a bare stage with four backing singers. Her pared-back presentation reflected a trend that has had success at recent Eurovisions, as it did not feature any form of choreography, dancers or elaborate stage show. "Satellite" received a total of 246 points, giving Germany its first victory since 1982, and the first win as a unified country. It also became the first winning song from a Big-Four country since Katrina and the Waves' victory for the United Kingdom in 1997. The song won over Turkey's entry "We Could Be the Same" with a margin of 76 points, the third-biggest in Eurovision history, after Sweden's participant Loreen managed a margin of 113 points in the 2012 contest and Alexander Rybak's margin of 169 points in the 2009 contest. "Satellite" received the maximum 12 points nine times and received points from all but five countries.

== Track listings ==
Digital release
No.	Title	Writer(s)	Producer(s)	Length
1.	"Satellite"	Julie Frost; John Gordon	André "Brix" Buchmann; Ingo Politz; Bernd Wendlandt; Gordon	2:54

Maxi single
No.	Title	Writer(s)	Producer(s)	Length
1.	"Love Me"	Stefan Raab; Lena Meyer-Landrut	Raab	2:59
2.	"Satellite"	Frost; Gordon	Brix; Politz; Wendlandt; Gordon	2:54
3.	"Bee"	Rosi Golan; Per Kristian Ottestad; Mayaeni Strauss	Ottestad	2:59

== Credits and personnel ==
- Lead vocals – Lena Meyer-Landrut
- Additional vocals – Kayna
- Audio remastering – Sascha "Busy" Bühren
- Producers – John Gordon, André "Brix" Buchmann, Ingo Politz, Bernd Wendtland for Valicon
- Music – Julie Frost, John Gordon
- Lyrics – Julie Frost
- Label: USFO for Universal Music Deutschland

== Charts ==
=== Weekly charts ===
Weekly chart performance for "Satellite"
Chart (2010)	Peak position
Australia (ARIA)	37
Austria (Ö3 Austria Top 40)	2
Belgium (Ultratop 50 Flanders)	4
Belgium (Ultratop 50 Wallonia)	6
Czech Republic Airplay (ČNS IFPI)	25
Denmark (Tracklisten)	1
Europe (European Hot 100 Singles)	1
Finland (Suomen virallinen lista)	1
Germany (GfK)	1
Greece Digital Songs (Billboard)	1
Hungary (Rádiós Top 40)	3
Iceland (RÚV)	1
Ireland (IRMA)	2
Israel International Airplay (Media Forest)	4
Luxembourg Digital Songs (Billboard)	1
Netherlands (Dutch Top 40)	31
Netherlands (Single Top 100)	5
Norway (VG-lista)	1
Poland Airplay (ZPAV)	5
Slovakia Airplay (ČNS IFPI)	6
Spain (Promusicae)	23
Sweden (Sverigetopplistan)	1
Switzerland (Schweizer Hitparade)	1
Turkey (Turkish Singles Chart)	13
UK Singles (Official Charts)	30

=== Year-end charts ===
Year-end chart performance for "Satellite"
Chart (2010)	Position
Austria (Ö3 Austria Top 40)	11
Belgium (Ultratop Flanders)	41
Europe (European Hot 100 Singles)	34
Germany (Official German Charts)	3
Hungary (Rádiós Top 40)	20
Netherlands (Dutch Top 40)	185
Sweden (Sverigetopplistan)	31
Switzerland (Schweizer Hitparade)	20

== Certifications ==
Certifications for "Satellite"
Region	Certification	Certified units/sales
Denmark (IFPI Danmark)	Gold	15,000^{^}
Germany (BVMI)	2× Platinum	600,000^{^}
Sweden (GLF)	Gold	20,000^{‡}
Switzerland (IFPI Switzerland)	Platinum	30,000^{^}
^{^} Shipments figures based on certification alone.^{‡} Sales+streaming figures based on certification alone.

== Awards and nominations ==
Year	Award	Category	Result
2010	Eurovision Song Contest 2010	1st place	Won
2010	1 LIVE KRONE	Best Single	Won
2011	2011 Echo Music Awards	Radio Echo for "Satellite"	Nominated
2011	2011 Echo Music Awards	Single of the Year	Nominated
2011	Comet	Best Song	Nominated

== Legacy ==
=== Jennifer Braun version ===
"Satellite"

Single by Jennifer Braun
- Released: 13 March 2010
- Recorded: 2010
- Genre: Pop
- Length: 3:11
- Label: USFO, Universal
- Songwriters: Julie Frost, John Gordon

Jennifer Braun singles chronology
"Bee" (2010)	"Satellite" (2010)	"I Care for You" (2010)

"Satellite" was also one of three songs performed by Braun in the final of Unser Star für Oslo. However, the audience chose Lena Meyer-Landrut and her version of "Satellite" for the contest in Oslo. Braun's version was also made available for digital download on 13 March 2010 and is also featured on Braun's maxi single "I Care for You". It subsequently charted in Germany, reaching a peak position of No. 32.

==== Credits and personnel ====
- Lead vocals – Jennifer Braun
- Music – Julie Frost, John Gordon
- Lyrics – Julie Frost
- Label: USFO for Universal Deutschland

==== Chart performance ====
Chart (2010)	Peak position
German Singles Chart	32

=== Stefan Raab version ===
"Satellite (Rockabilly Version)"

Single by Stefan Raab feat. Lena
- Released: 11 May 2011
- Genre: Pop; electro-pop
- Length: 4:20
- Label: Universal Music Germany
- Songwriters: Julie Frost; John Gordon

During the opening act of the 2011 Eurovision Song Contest in Düsseldorf Stefan Raab performed a Rockabilly version of this song where Meyer-Landrut was briefly involved as duet partner. The studio version of the song was released as a single and charted No. 24 in Germany.

The original version of the song also re-entered the iTunes singles charts in several countries.

=== Other versions ===
Satellite was covered several times, including in German with the title Schland Oh Schland by the student's band Uwu Lena in 2010 and in Turkish titled Laviva for a chocolate bar commercial by the food company Ülker in 2013.

Tia Kofi released a cover of the song in 2023.

== See also ==
- List of number-one hits in Denmark
- List of Finnish number-one hits
- List of number-one hits of 2010 (Germany)
- List of number-one hits in Norway
- List of number-one hits of 2010 (Sweden)
- List of number-one hits of 2010 (Switzerland)
- List of European number-one hits of 2010

== Notes ==
Preceded by "Fairytale" by Alexander Rybak	Eurovision Song Contest winners 2010	Succeeded by "Running Scared" by Ell & Nikki
