= Touch a New Day =

Single by Lena

from the album My Cassette Player
- B-side: "We Can't Go On"
- Released: 3 August 2010
- Recorded: 2010
- Genre: Pop
- Length: 3:07
- Label: USFO; Universal
- Songwriter(s): Stefan Raab
- Producer(s): Stefan Raab

Lena singles chronology
"Satellite" (2010)	"Touch a New Day" (2010)	"Taken by a Stranger" (2011)

"Touch a New Day" is a song by German singer Lena Meyer-Landrut. It was written and produced by entertainer Stefan Raab for her debut album My Cassette Player (2010). The song was released on 3 August 2010 as the album's second and final single, following Meyer-Landrut's victory at the Eurovision Song Contest 2010.

== Music video ==
The music video for "Touch a New Day" was directed by Marten Persiel. It starts with a couple in their house's front yard, she's watering the grass and he's washing the car. Meyer-Landrut and her friend are behind a bush and Meyer-Landrut calls through the telephone to the house, so the man comes into the house to pick it up and Meyer-Landrut and her friend steal the car. They travel to several places such as France, Spain, they take photos in a photo booth, they have a bath in a lake. Later, they meet a junkman and ask him to remove the upper part of the car, so it becomes a "convertible". In some point they argue for the way to follow but they make up immediately. Finally, they pick up a boy whose roulotte has broken and, in the evening they build a bonfire on a cliff beside the sea.

== Formats and track listings ==
Digital release
No.	Title	Writer(s)	Producer(s)	Length
1.	"Touch a New Day"	Stefan Raab	Raab	3:07

Maxi single
No.	Title	Writer(s)	Producer(s)	Length
1.	"Touch a New Day"	Stefan Raab	Raab	3:07
2.	"We Can't Go On"	Pär Lammers, Daniel Schaub	Raab	3:13

== Credits and personnel ==
- Lead vocals – Lena Meyer-Landrut
- Producers – Stefan Raab
- Music – Stefan Raab
- Lyrics – Stefan Raab
- Label: USFO for Universal Deutschland

== Charts ==
Weekly chart performance for "Touch a New Day"
Chart (2010)	Peak position
Austria (Ö3 Austria Top 40)	26
Germany (GfK)	13
