= Bee (song) =

2010 song

'"Bee" is a song recorded by German singers Lena Meyer-Landrut and Jennifer Braun, composed by American-Israeli songwriter Rosi Golan, American singer-songwriter Mayaeni Strauss and Norwegian songwriter Per Kristian Ottestad. Both Braun and Meyer-Landrut released their versions of the song, but Meyer-Landrut's version outperformed Braun's, reaching number three in the German singles chart while Braun's version peaked at No. 21.

== Jennifer Braun version ==
"Bee"

Single by Jennifer Braun
- Released: 13 March 2010
- Recorded: 2010
- Genre: Pop
- Length: 2:38
- Label: USFO, Universal
- Songwriters: Rosi Golan, Mayaeni Strauss, Per Kristian Ottestad

Jennifer Braun singles chronology
"Bee" (2010)	"Satellite" (2010)

"Bee" was one of three songs performed by Jennifer Braun in the final of Unser Star für Oslo (Our Star for Oslo), the national pre-selection programme for Germany's entry to the Eurovision Song Contest 2010. However, the audience chose Braun's contender Lena Meyer-Landrut and her version of the song "Satellite" for the contest in Oslo. "Bee" was made available for digital download on 13 March 2010 and is also featured on Braun's maxi single "I Care for You". "Bee" subsequently charted in Germany, reaching a peak position of No. 21.

=== Credits and personnel ===
- Lead vocals – Jennifer Braun
- Producer – Per Kristian "Boots" Ottestad
- Music – Rosi Golan, Per Kristian "Boots" Ottestad, Mayaeni Strauss
- Lyrics – Rosi Golan, Per Kristian "Boots" Ottestad, Mayaeni Strauss
- Label: USFO for Universal Deutschland

=== Chart performance ===
Chart (2010)	Peak position
Germany (GfK)	21

== Lena Meyer-Landrut version ==
"Bee"

Single by Lena

from the album My Cassette Player
- Released: 13 March 2010
- Recorded: 2010
- Genre: Pop
- Length: 2:59
- Label: USFO, Universal Music Germany
- Songwriters: Rosi Golan, Mayaeni Strauss, Per Kristian Ottestad
- Producer: Per Kristian Ottestad

"Bee" was also performed by Lena Meyer-Landrut in the final of Unser Star für Oslo. However, the audience chose "Satellite" to be her designated song for the contest in Oslo. Meyer Landrut's version of "Bee" was also made available for digital download on 13 March 2010, and is featured on Meyer-Landrut's maxi single "Satellite". The song subsequently charted in Germany, Austria and Switzerland, reaching peak positions of No. 3, #26 and No. 27 respectively.

"Bee" is from Meyer-Landrut's debut album My Cassette Player, which was released on 7 May 2010.

=== Track listing ===
Digital release
No.	Title	Writer(s)	Producer(s)	Length
1.	"Bee"	Rosi Golan, Per Kristian Ottestad, Mayaeni Strauss	Ottestad	2:59

=== Credits and personnel ===
- Lead vocals – Lena Meyer-Landrut
- Producer – Per Kristian "Boots" Ottestad
- Music – Rosi Golan, Per Kristian "Boots" Ottestad, Mayaeni Strauss
- Lyrics – Rosi Golan, Per Kristian "Boots" Ottestad, Mayaeni Strauss
- Label: USFO for Universal Deutschland

=== Charts ===
==== Weekly charts ====
Chart (2010)	Peak position
Austria (Ö3 Austria Top 40)	26
Germany (GfK)	3
Switzerland (Schweizer Hitparade)	27

==== Year-end charts ====
Chart (2010)	Position
German Singles Chart	99
