= Jennifer Braun =

German singer (born 1991)

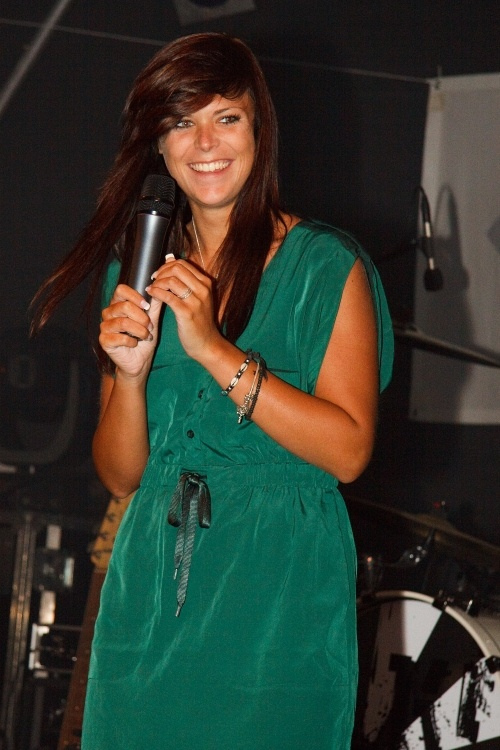
- Braun in 2010

Background information
- Born: 28 April 1991 (age 35)
- Origin: Rüdesheim am Rhein, Germany
- Genres: Pop
- Occupation: Singer
- Labels: USFO, Universal

Jennifer Braun (born 28 April 1991) is a German singer. She was runner-up at the talent show Unser Star für Oslo, Germany's national pre-selection show for the Eurovision Song Contest 2010. Her first music single was "I Care for You".

== Biography ==
=== Early life ===
Braun was born on 28 April 1991 in Rüdesheim am Rhein and lives in Eltville, Germany. Her father works in industrial asset liquidation and her mother is a saleslady. Braun attended the Obermayr high school in Wiesbaden-Erbenheim. Until 2010, she had her most notable appearances as a singer with her band Rewind at town festivals and at the Wiesbaden wine festival. She took part in the seventh season's castings of Deutschland sucht den Superstar, the German edition of Pop Idol, however, she was eliminated after the first recall round.

=== 2010: Unser Star für Oslo ===
In 2010, Braun applied for the talent show Unser Star für Oslo (Our Star for Oslo), a newly created national television programme to select the German entry for the Eurovision Song Contest 2010 in Oslo. The show was organised by public broadcaster ARD and private television channel ProSieben, as well as entertainer and music producer Stefan Raab. Among 4,500 entrants, Braun was picked as one of the 20 contestants for the show.

Braun mostly performed well-known pop and rock ballads to reach the show's semi-final, in which she sang the rock song "Heavy Cross" by Gossip and Christina Aguilera's ballad "Hurt". The jury panel praised her powerful voice and her confident performances and she beat favoured contestant Christian Durstewitz to progress to the last show. In the final on 12 March 2010, Braun sang three songs specifically submitted for the contest, "Bee", "Satellite", and "I Care for You". Through televoting, the audience chose "I Care for You" to be her designated song in case she wins the show, however, she was defeated in the final vote by Lena Meyer-Landrut, the heavy favourite to win Unser Star für Oslo from the first night.

All songs performed in the final of Unser Star für Oslo were made available for digital download on iTunes Germany and Musicload.de the following day. Braun's "I Care for You" reached number 10 on the German Singles Chart based on digital downloads alone, while her versions of "Bee" and "Satellite" reached the top 40 in Germany. "I Care for You" also charted in Austria.

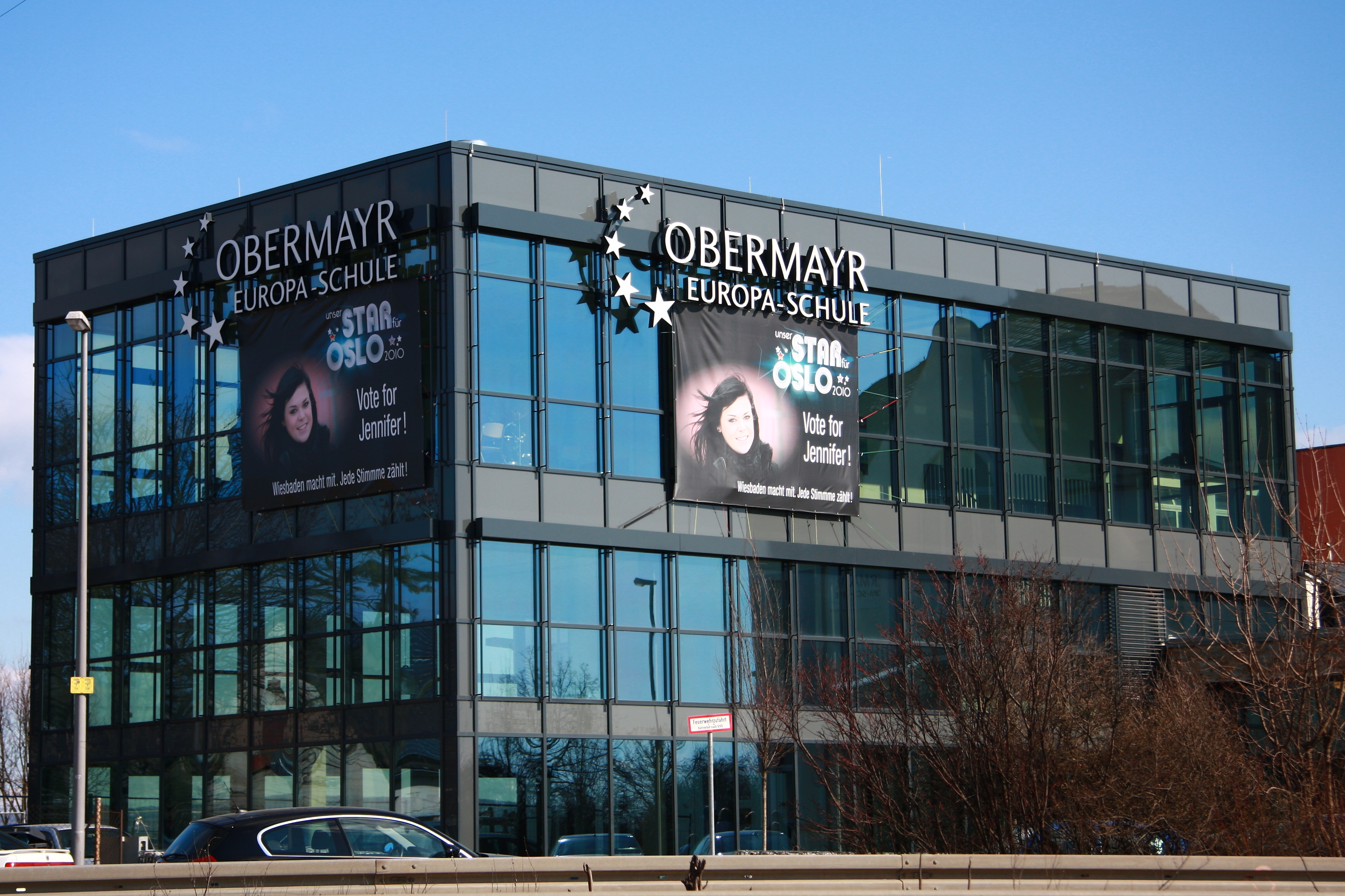
Banner at Braun's school in Wiesbaden

Appearances on Unser Star für Oslo
Show	Song	Original artist
2nd show	"I'm Outta Love"	Anastacia
3rd show	"Like the Way I Do"	Melissa Etheridge
4th show	"I'm with You"	Avril Lavigne
5th show	"Ain't Nobody"	Chaka Khan
Quarter-final (6th show)	"Soulmate" "Nobody's Wife"	Natasha Bedingfield; Anouk
Semi-final (7th show)	"Heavy Cross" "Hurt"	Gossip; Christina Aguilera
Final (8th show)	"Bee" "Satellite" "I Care for You"	Braun / Lena Meyer-Landrut; Braun / Lena Meyer-Landrut; Braun

Braun and Lena Meyer-Landrut both sang different versions of "Bee" and "Satellite" in the final

=== 2010–present: First studio album ===
Braun was put under contract by Universal Music. She had her first major appearance outside Unser Star für Oslo on the show "Fernsehgarten" on 23 May 2010. She is currently working on her first album.

== Discography ==
=== Singles ===
Year	Song	Peak chart positions		
Year	Song	GER	AT	SWI
2010	"I Care for You"	10	68	–
2010	"Bee"	21	–	–
2010	"Satellite"	32	–	–

"I Care for You", "Bee" and "Satellite" charted simultaneously
