= List of European number-one hits of 2010 =

This is a list of the European Hot 100 Singles and European Top 100 Albums number one of 2010, as published by Billboard magazine. This was the final year of the Billboard European charts.

== Chart history ==
Key
†	Indicates best-performing single and album of 2010

Issue date	Song	Artist	Album	Artist	Ref.
6 January	"Meet Me Halfway"	The Black Eyed Peas	The Fame †	Lady Gaga	
13 January	"Bad Romance" †	Lady Gaga	The Fame †	Lady Gaga	
20 January	"Meet Me Halfway"	The Black Eyed Peas	The Fame †	Lady Gaga	
27 January	"Bad Romance" †	Lady Gaga	The Fame †	Lady Gaga	
3 February	"Tik Tok"	Kesha	The Fame †	Lady Gaga	
10 February	"Tik Tok"	Kesha	The Fame †	Lady Gaga	
17 February	"Tik Tok"	Kesha	Soldier of Love	Sade	
24 February	"Tik Tok"	Kesha	Soldier of Love	Sade	
3 March	"Tik Tok"	Kesha	Soldier of Love	Sade	
10 March	"Alors on danse"	Stromae	Soldier of Love	Sade	
17 March	"Tik Tok"	Kesha	Plastic Beach	Gorillaz	
24 March	"Alors on danse"	Stromae	A Curious Thing	Amy Macdonald	
31 March	"Alors on danse"	Stromae	A Curious Thing	Amy Macdonald	
7 April	"Alors on danse"	Stromae	A Curious Thing	Amy Macdonald	
14 April	"Telephone"	Lady Gaga featuring Beyoncé	The Fame †	Lady Gaga	
21 April	"Telephone"	Lady Gaga featuring Beyoncé	The Fame †	Lady Gaga	
28 April	"Alors on danse"	Stromae	Iron Man 2	AC/DC	
5 May	"Alors on danse"	Stromae	Iron Man 2	AC/DC	
12 May	"Alors on danse"	Stromae	Iron Man 2	AC/DC	
19 May	"Alors on danse"	Stromae	Iron Man 2	AC/DC	
26 May	"Alors on danse"	Stromae	Iron Man 2	AC/DC	
2 June	"Alors on danse"	Stromae	The House	Katie Melua	
9 June	"Satellite"	Lena	To the Sea	Jack Johnson	
16 June	"Wavin' Flag (Celebration Mix)"	K'Naan	Bionic	Christina Aguilera	
23 June	"Wavin' Flag (Celebration Mix)"	K'Naan	The House	Katie Melua	
30 June	"Wavin' Flag (Celebration Mix)"	K'Naan	Recovery	Eminem	
7 July	"California Gurls"	Katy Perry featuring Snoop Dogg	Recovery	Eminem	
14 July	"California Gurls"	Katy Perry featuring Snoop Dogg	Aphrodite	Kylie Minogue	
21 July	"California Gurls"	Katy Perry featuring Snoop Dogg	Recovery	Eminem	
28 July	"Waka Waka (This Time for Africa)"	Shakira featuring Freshlyground	Recovery	Eminem	
4 August	"Waka Waka (This Time for Africa)"	Shakira featuring Freshlyground	Recovery	Eminem	
11 August	"Waka Waka (This Time for Africa)"	Shakira featuring Freshlyground	The Suburbs	Arcade Fire	
18 August	"Waka Waka (This Time for Africa)"	Shakira featuring Freshlyground	Recovery	Eminem	
25 August	"Waka Waka (This Time for Africa)"	Shakira featuring Freshlyground	The Final Frontier	Iron Maiden	
1 September	"Waka Waka (This Time for Africa)"	Shakira featuring Freshlyground	The Final Frontier	Iron Maiden	
8 September	"We No Speak Americano"	Yolanda Be Cool and DCUP	Teenage Dream	Katy Perry	
15 September	"We No Speak Americano"	Yolanda Be Cool and DCUP	Teenage Dream	Katy Perry	
22 September	"We No Speak Americano"	Yolanda Be Cool and DCUP	A Thousand Suns	Linkin Park	
29 September	"Love the Way You Lie"	Eminem featuring Rihanna	Going Back	Phil Collins	
6 October	"Love the Way You Lie"	Eminem featuring Rihanna	Going Back	Phil Collins	
13 October	"Love the Way You Lie"	Eminem featuring Rihanna	Going Back	Phil Collins	
20 October	"Love the Way You Lie"	Eminem featuring Rihanna	In and Out of Consciousness: Greatest Hits 1990–2010	Robbie Williams	
27 October	"Love the Way You Lie"	Eminem featuring Rihanna	Come Around Sundown	Kings of Leon	
3 November	"Only Girl (In the World)"	Rihanna	Come Around Sundown	Kings of Leon	
10 November	"Only Girl (In the World)"	Rihanna	Greatest Hits	Bon Jovi	
17 November	"Only Girl (In the World)"	Rihanna	Greatest Hits	Bon Jovi	
24 November	"Only Girl (In the World)"	Rihanna	Loud	Rihanna	
1 December	"Only Girl (In the World)"	Rihanna	Progress	Take That	
