= Germany in the Eurovision Song Contest 2010 =

- Eurovision Song Contest 2010
- Participating broadcaster: ARD (Note: Arbeitsgemeinschaft der öffentlich-rechtlichen Rundfunkanstalten der Bundesrepublik Deutschland) – Norddeutscher Rundfunk (NDR)
- Country: Germany
- Selection process: Unser Star für Oslo
- Selection date: 12 March 2010

Competing entry
- Song: "Satellite"
- Artist: Lena
- Songwriters: Julie Frost; John Gordon

Placement
- Final result: 1st, 246 points

Participation chronology

Germany was represented at the Eurovision Song Contest 2010 with the song "Satellite", written by Julie Frost and John Gordon, and performed by Lena. The German participating broadcaster on behalf of ARD, Norddeutscher Rundfunk (NDR), organised the national final Unser Star für Oslo in order to select their entry for the contest in collaboration with private broadcaster ProSieben. The national final featured 20 competing artists and consisted of five heats, a quarter-final, a semi-final and a final held in February and March 2010. Contestants were selected to advance in the competition via public televote. Two contestants qualified to compete in the final where the winner was selected over two rounds of voting. "Satellite" performed by Lena was selected as the German entry after placing among the top two during the first round of voting and ultimately gaining the most votes in the second round.

As a member of the "Big Four", Germany automatically qualified to compete in the final of the Eurovision Song Contest. Performing in position 22, Germany placed first out of the 25 participating countries, winning the contest with 246 points. This was Germany's second win in the Eurovision Song Contest; their first victory was in 1982.

== Background ==
Prior to the 2010 contest, ARD had participated in the Eurovision Song Contest representing Germany fifty-three times since its debut in 1956. It has won the contest on one occasion: in 1982 with the song "Ein bißchen Frieden" performed by Nicole. Germany, to this point, has been noted for having competed in the contest more than any other country; they have competed in every contest since the first edition in 1956 except for 1996 when it was eliminated in a pre-contest elimination round. In 2009, the German entry "Miss Kiss Kiss Bang" performed by Alex Swings Oscar Sings! placed twentieth out of twenty-five competing songs scoring 35 points.

As part of its duties as participating broadcaster, ARD organises the selection of its entry in the Eurovision Song Contest and broadcasts the event in the country. Since 1996, ARD had delegated the participation in the contest to its member Norddeutscher Rundfunk (NDR). NDR confirmed that it would participate in the 2010 contest on 20 July 2009. Between 1996 and 2008, NDR had set up national finals with several artists to choose both the song and performer to compete at Eurovision for Germany, while the broadcaster internally selected both the artist and song for the contest in 2009. On 25 May 2009, ARD and NDR was revealed to have approached music producer and three-time German Eurovision participant (as singer and/or songwriter) Stefan Raab and private broadcaster ProSieben to collaborate in preparing for the 2010 contest with a view of creating a possible winning combination of artist and song. While ProSieben had accepted the offer, Raab had refused the request. Along with their participation confirmation, it was announced that Raab would in fact work with the two broadcasters in preparing for the 2010 contest.

== Before Eurovision ==
=== Unser Star für Oslo ===
The logo of Unser Star für Oslo

Unser Star für Oslo (English: Our Star for Oslo) was the competition that selected the German entry for the Eurovision Song Contest 2010. The competition consisted of five heats, a quarter-final, a semi-final and a final that took place between 2 February 2010 and 12 March 2010 at the Köln-Mülheim Studios in Cologne, hosted by Matthias Opdenhövel and Sabine Heinrich. The competition was co-produced by the production company Brainpool. The shows were broadcast alternatively on ProSieben and Das Erste; the heats and semi-final were broadcast on ProSieben, while the quarter-final and final were broadcast on Das Erste as well as online via NDR's official website ndr.de.

==== Format ====
The competition consisted of eight shows: five heats between 2 February 2010 and 2 March 2010, a quarter-final on 23 February 2010, a semi-final on 9 March 2010 and a final on 12 March 2010. In each of the first two heats, 10 of the 20 contestants performed and five were eliminated from the competition. An additional two contestants were eliminated in each of the third and fourth heat, while one was eliminated in each of the fifth heat and quarter-final, respectively, and two were eliminated in the semi-final. The remaining two contestants proceeded to the final where they each performed their three songs bidding for Eurovision and the German entry was selected. The results of all eight shows were determined by public televoting, including options for landline and SMS voting.

==== Competing entries ====
Interested performers aged over 18 were able to apply for the competition by submitting an online application and presenting themselves at casting shows held at the Köln-Mülheim Studios in Cologne between 18 September 2009 and 22 November 2009 as well as between 13 November 2009 and 15 November 2009. By the end of the process, it was announced that over 4,500 applications were received and 20 contestants were selected by Stefan Raab together with an expert panel consisting of ARD representatives. The four candidate Eurovision songs, selected by representatives of the record company Universal Music from over 300 songs submitted by individual composers and lyricists, were announced during the final.

| Song | Songwriter(s) |
|---|---|
| "Bee" | Rosi Golan, Per Kristian Ottestad, Mayaeni Strauss |
| "I Care for You" | Martin Fliegenschmidt, Claudio Pagonis, Max Mutzke |
| "Love Me" | Stefan Raab, Lena Meyer-Landrut |
| "Satellite" | Julie Frost, John Gordon |

==== Elimination chart ====
| Contestant | Heat 1 | Heat 2 | Heat 3 | Heat 4 | Heat 5 | Quarter-final | Semi-final | Final |
|---|---|---|---|---|---|---|---|---|
| Lena Meyer-Landrut | Safe | —N/a | Safe | Safe | Safe | Safe | Safe | Winner |
| Jennifer Braun | —N/a | Safe | Safe | Safe | Safe | Safe | Safe | Runner-up |
| Christian Durstewitz | —N/a | Safe | Safe | Safe | Safe | Safe | 3rd place | |
| Kerstin Freking | Safe | —N/a | Safe | Safe | Safe | Safe | 4th place | |
| Sharyhan Osman | —N/a | Safe | Safe | Safe | Safe | 5th place | | |
| Leon Taylor | —N/a | Safe | Safe | Safe | Eliminated | | | |
| Cyril Krueger | Safe | —N/a | Safe | Eliminated | | | | |
| Katrin Walter | Safe | —N/a | Safe | Eliminated | | | | |
| Maria-Lisa Straßburg | —N/a | Safe | Eliminated | | | | | |
| Meri Voskanian | Safe | —N/a | Eliminated | | | | | |
| Benjamin Hartmann | —N/a | Eliminated | | | | | | |
| Behnam Seifi | —N/a | Eliminated | | | | | | |
| Alex Senzig | —N/a | Eliminated | | | | | | |
| Jana Wall | —N/a | Eliminated | | | | | | |
| Franziska Weber | —N/a | Eliminated | | | | | | |
| Johannes Böhm | Eliminated | | | | | | | |
| Michael Kraus | Eliminated | | | | | | | |
| Benjamin Peters | Eliminated | | | | | | | |
| Sebastian Schwarzbach | Eliminated | | | | | | | |
| Daliah Sharaf | Eliminated | | | | | | | |

==== Heats ====
The five televised heats took place between 2 February and 2 March 2010. Stefan Raab alongside two music experts also provided feedback in regards to the contestants during each heat. The experts were Yvonne Catterfeld and Marius Müller-Westernhagen for the first heat, Sarah Connor and Peter Maffay for the second heat, Nena and König Boris for the third heat, Sasha and Cassandra Steen for the fourth heat, and Joy Denalane and Rea Garvey for the fifth heat.

Heat 1 – 2 February 2010
| R/O | Artist | Song (Original artists) | Result |
|---|---|---|---|
| 1 | Benjamin Peters | "Bodies" (Robbie Williams) | —N/a |
| 2 | Kerstin Freking | "My Immortal" (Evanescence) | Advanced |
| 3 | Johannes Böhm | "Crazy" (Seal) | —N/a |
| 4 | Daliah Sharaf | "At Last" (Etta James) | —N/a |
| 5 | Cyril Krueger | "Hotel California" (Eagles) | Advanced |
| 6 | Michael Kraus | "Loving You" (Paolo Nutini) | —N/a |
| 7 | Meri Voskanian | "Release Me" (Agnes) | Advanced |
| 8 | Katrin Walter | "Nobody Knows" (Pink) | Advanced |
| 9 | Sebastian Schwarzbach | "Home" (Michael Bublé) | —N/a |
| 10 | Lena Meyer-Landrut | "My Same" (Adele) | Advanced |

Heat 2 – 9 February 2010
| R/O | Artist | Song (Original artists) | Result |
|---|---|---|---|
| 1 | Jennifer Braun | "I'm Outta Love" (Anastacia) | Advanced |
| 2 | Benjamin Hartmann | "Better Together" (Jack Johnson) | —N/a |
| 3 | Maria-Lisa Straßburg | "Saving My Face" (KT Tunstall) | Advanced |
| 4 | Behnam Seifi | "Save Room" (John Legend) | —N/a |
| 5 | Sharyhan Osman | "I Have Nothing" (Whitney Houston) | Advanced |
| 6 | Alex Senzig | "Wherever You Will Go" (The Calling) | —N/a |
| 7 | Jana Wall | "Who Knew" (Pink) | —N/a |
| 8 | Franziska Weber | "Love Foolosophy" (Jamiroquai) | —N/a |
| 9 | Leon Taylor | "Der Weg" (Herbert Grönemeyer) | Advanced |
| 10 | Christian Durstewitz | "Faith" (George Michael) | Advanced |

Heat 3 – 16 February 2010
| R/O | Artist | Song (Original artists) | Result |
|---|---|---|---|
| 1 | Meri Voskanian | "If I Ain't Got You" (Alicia Keys) | —N/a |
| 2 | Jennifer Braun | "Like the Way I Do" (Melissa Etheridge) | Advanced |
| 3 | Maria-Lisa Straßburg | "Helena" (My Chemical Romance) | —N/a |
| 4 | Leon Taylor | "Irgendwas bleibt" (Silbermond) | Advanced |
| 5 | Katrin Walter | "Warwick Avenue" (Duffy) | Advanced |
| 6 | Kerstin Freking | "Not Ready to Make Nice" (Dixie Chicks) | Advanced |
| 7 | Christian Durstewitz | "Change" (Daniel Merriweather) | Advanced |
| 8 | Sharyhan Osman | "Feel the Nile" (original composition) | Advanced |
| 9 | Lena Meyer-Landrut | "Diamond Dave" (The Bird and the Bee) | Advanced |
| 10 | Cyril Krueger | "Hot Fudge" (Robbie Williams) | Advanced |

Heat 4 – 23 February 2010
| R/O | Artist | Song (Original artists) | Result |
|---|---|---|---|
| 1 | Katrin Walter | "Love Song" (Sara Bareilles) | —N/a |
| 2 | Sharyhan Osman | "Is You Is or Is You Ain't My Baby" (Louis Jordan) | Advanced |
| 3 | Cyril Krueger | "Beautiful Day" (U2) | —N/a |
| 4 | Jennifer Braun | "I'm with You" (Avril Lavigne) | Advanced |
| 5 | Christian Durstewitz | "Another Night" (original composition) | Advanced |
| 6 | Lena Meyer-Landrut | "Foundations" (Kate Nash) | Advanced |
| 7 | Kerstin Freking | "Thank U" (Alanis Morissette) | Advanced |
| 8 | Leon Taylor | "Are You Gonna Go My Way" (Lenny Kravitz) | Advanced |

Heat 5 – 2 March 2010
| R/O | Artist | Song (Original artists) | Result |
|---|---|---|---|
| 1 | Kerstin Freking | "Better" (Regina Spektor) | Advanced |
| 2 | Lena Meyer-Landrut | "New Shoes" (Paolo Nutini) | Advanced |
| 3 | Jennifer Braun | "Ain't Nobody" (Rufus and Chaka Khan) | Advanced |
| 4 | Leon Taylor | "Tears in Heaven" (Eric Clapton) | —N/a |
| 5 | Sharyhan Osman | "In the City" (original composition) | Advanced |
| 6 | Christian Durstewitz | "Dance with Somebody" (Mando Diao) | Advanced |

==== Quarter-final ====
The televised quarter-final took place on 5 March 2010 where an additional contestant was eliminated. Stefan Raab alongside two music experts also provided feedback in regards to the contestants during the show. The experts were Anke Engelke and Adel Tawil.

Quarter-final – 5 March 2010
| Artist | R/O | First song (Original artists) | R/O | Second song (Original artists) | Result |
|---|---|---|---|---|---|
| Sharyhan Osman | 1 | "You've Got the Love" (Florence and the Machine) | 6 | "Never Felt The Way That I Feel Today" (original composition) | —N/a |
| Jennifer Braun | 2 | "Soulmate" (Natasha Bedingfield) | 7 | "Nobody's Wife" (Anouk) | Advanced |
| Kerstin Freking | 3 | "If a Song Could Get Me You" (Marit Larsen) | 8 | "Somedays" (Regina Spektor) | Advanced |
| Christian Durstewitz | 4 | "Ochrasy" (Mando Diao) | 9 | "Stalker" (original composition) | Advanced |
| Lena Meyer-Landrut | 5 | "Mouthwash" (Kate Nash) | 10 | "Neopolitan Dreams" (Lisa Mitchell) | Advanced |

==== Semi-final ====
The televised semi-final took place on 9 March 2010 where an additional two contestants were eliminated. Stefan Raab alongside two music experts also provided feedback in regards to the contestants during the show. The experts were Barbara Schöneberger and Jan Delay.

Semi-final – 9 March 2010
| Artist | R/O | First song (Original artists) | R/O | Second song (Original artists) | Result |
|---|---|---|---|---|---|
| Christian Durstewitz | 1 | "I'm Yours" (Jason Mraz) | 5 | "In Your Hands" (Charlie Winston) | —N/a |
| Kerstin Freking | 2 | "Hands Clean" (Alanis Morissette) | (Already eliminated) | | —N/a |
| Lena Meyer-Landrut | 3 | "Mr. Curiosity" (Jason Mraz) | 6 | "The Lovecats" (The Cure) | Advanced |
| Jennifer Braun | 4 | "Heavy Cross" (Gossip) | 7 | "Hurt" (Christina Aguilera) | Advanced |

===== Final =====
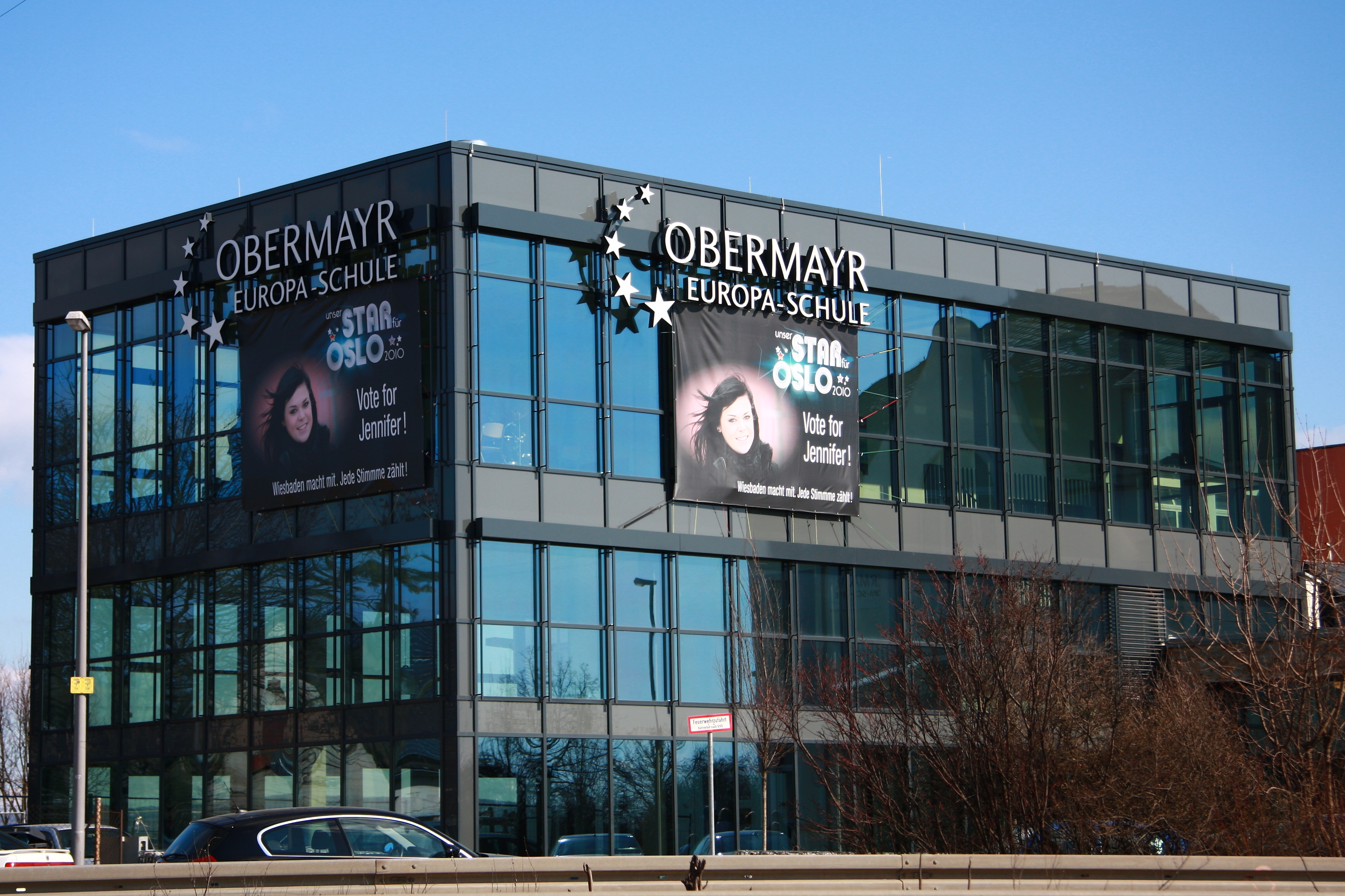
Prior to the final of the event, a banner supporting eventual runner-up Jennifer Braun could be seen on a building in Wiesbaden.

The televised final took place on 12 March 2010 where each of the two finalists performed three candidate Eurovision songs, including an individual song. The winner was selected through two rounds of public televoting. In the first round of voting, one song per finalist was selected to proceed to the second round. In the second round, the winner, "Satellite" performed by Lena Meyer-Landrut, was selected. Stefan Raab and two music experts provided feedback in regards to the songs during the show. The experts were Stefanie Kloß and Xavier Naidoo. In addition to the performances of the competing entries, Xavier Naidoo performed his song "Ich brauche dich".

First Round – 12 March 2010
| R/O | Artist | Song | Result |
|---|---|---|---|
| 1 | Jennifer Braun | "Bee" | —N/a |
| 2 | Lena Meyer-Landrut | "Bee" | —N/a |
| 3 | Jennifer Braun | "Satellite" | —N/a |
| 4 | Lena Meyer-Landrut | "Satellite" | Advanced |
| 5 | Jennifer Braun | "I Care for You" | Advanced |
| 6 | Lena Meyer-Landrut | "Love Me" | —N/a |

Second Round – 12 March 2010
| R/O | Artist | Song | Place |
|---|---|---|---|
| 1 | Lena Meyer-Landrut | "Satellite" | 1 |
| 2 | Jennifer Braun | "I Care for You" | 2 |

==== Ratings ====
Viewing figures by show
| Show | Date | Viewing figures | | Ref. |
| Show | Date | Nominal | Share | Ref. |
|---|---|---|---|---|
| Heat 1 | 2 February 2010 | 2,620,000 | 8.5% | |
| Heat 2 | 9 February 2010 | 2,200,000 | 7.0% | |
| Heat 3 | 16 February 2010 | 2,160,000 | 6.8% | |
| Heat 4 | 23 February 2010 | 1,870,000 | 6.0% | |
| Heat 5 | 2 March 2010 | 2,150,000 | 7.2% | |
| Quarter-final | 5 March 2010 | 3,020,000 | 9.8% | |
| Semi-final | 9 March 2010 | 2,300,000 | 14.4% (Note: Market share of viewers aged between 14 and 49) | |
| Final | 12 March 2010 | 4,500,000 | 14.6% | |

=== Promotion ===
The six versions of the four finalist songs on 12 March following the final of Unser Star für Oslo. By 13 March, Lena led the German iTunes download charts with all three of her songs: "Satellite" taking the top spot, followed by "Bee" in second and "Love Me" in third place. Jennifer Braun's song "I Care for You" took fourth place in the chart, followed by her versions of "Bee" and "Satellite" in 7th and 14th position respectively. A maxi single featuring Lena's three songs was released on 16 March. "Satellite" entered the German singles chart at number one and has been certified platinum since. On 16 March, the official music video of "Satellite" premiered on Das Erste right before Germany's most watched evening news bulletin Tagesschau. Shortly after, it was simultaneously shown on four private stations (Sat.1, ProSieben, kabel eins, N24) before the start of their evening prime time programmes. As of July 2021, the two officially uploaded YouTube videos of the song have jointly generated more than 109 million views since their release.

== At Eurovision ==
According to Eurovision rules, all nations with the exceptions of the host country and the "Big Four" (France, Germany, Spain, and the United Kingdom) were required to qualify from one of two semi-finals in order to compete for the final; the top ten countries from each semi-final progress to the final. As a member of the "Big Four", Germany automatically qualified to compete in the final on 16 May 2009. In addition to their participation in the final, Germany is also required to broadcast and vote in one of the two semi-finals. During the semi-final allocation draw on 7 February 2010, Germany was assigned to broadcast and vote in the first semi-final on 25 May 2010.

In Germany, the two semi-finals and the final were broadcast on Das Erste which featured commentary by Peter Urban. The final was also broadcast on NDR 2 which featured commentary by Tim Frühling and Thomas Mohr. The final was watched by 14.73 million viewers in Germany, a market share of 49 per cent, which is the second-highest viewership in absolute numbers ever registered for a Eurovision final in Germany. NDR appointed Hape Kerkeling as its spokesperson to announce the top 12-point score awarded by the German vote during the final.

=== Final ===
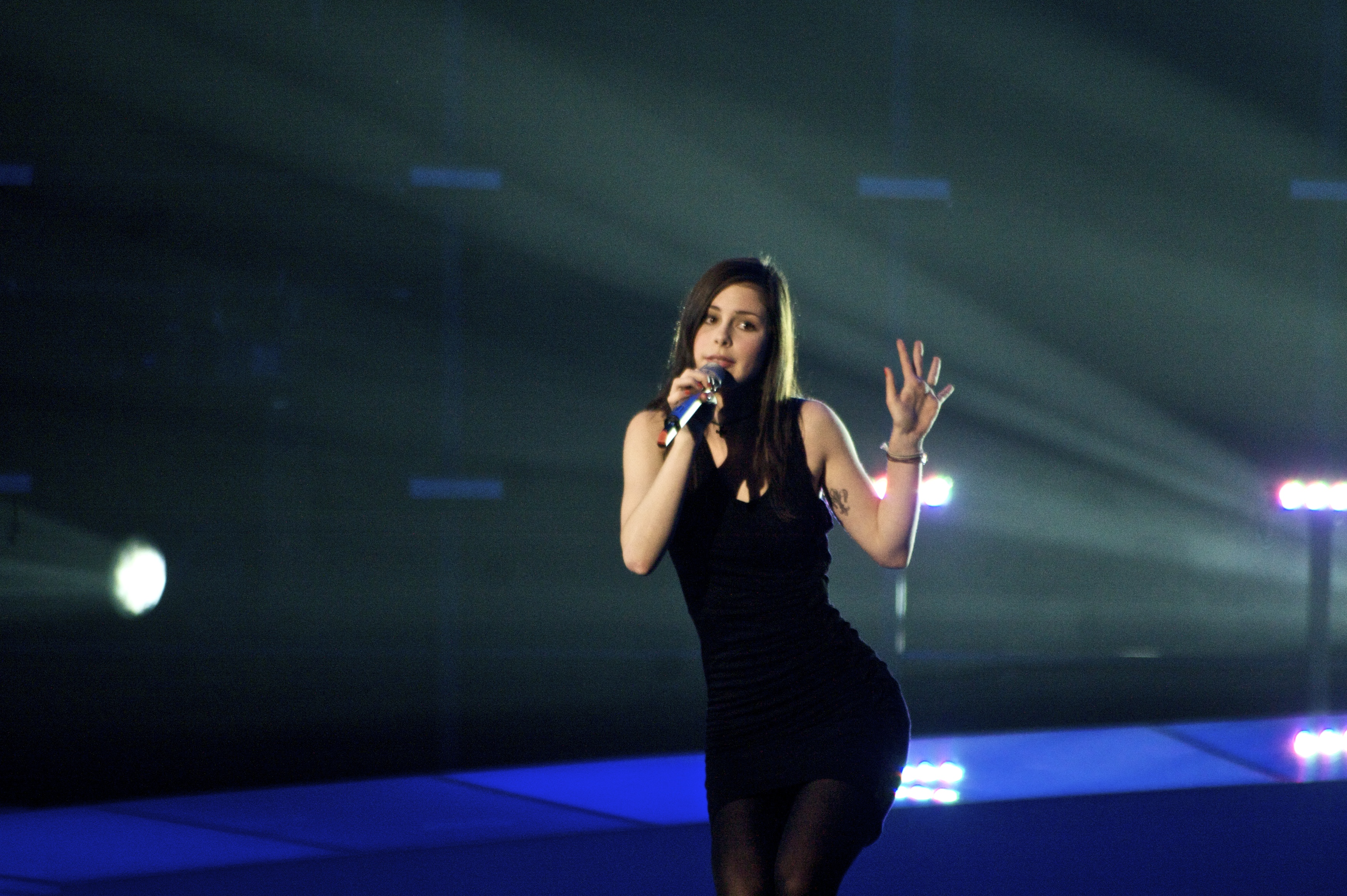
Lena during a rehearsal before the final

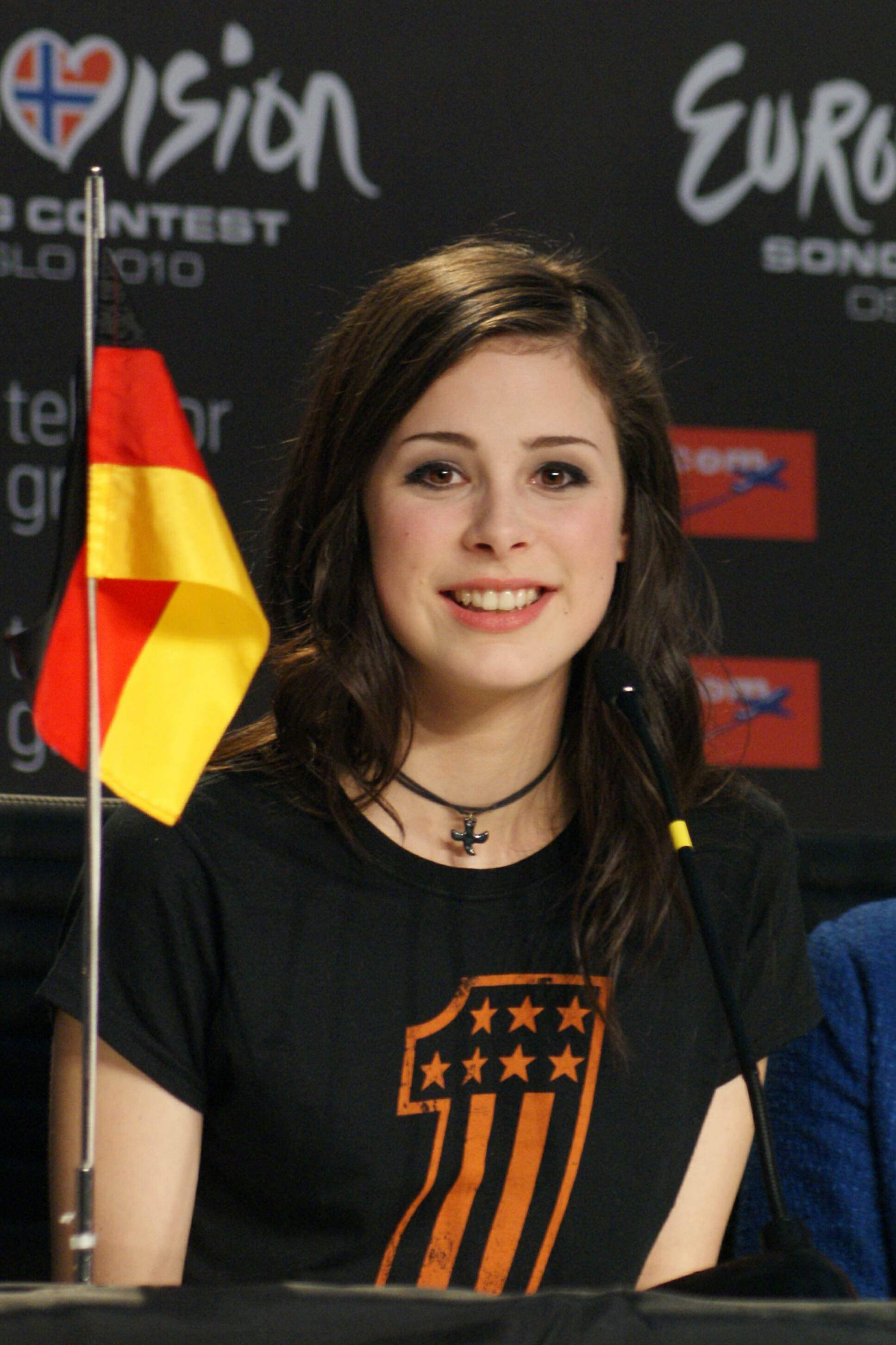
Lena during the winner's press conference

Lena took part in technical rehearsals on 22 and 23 May, followed by dress rehearsals on 28 and 29 May. This included the jury final on 28 May where the professional juries of each country watched and voted on the competing entries. During the running order draw for the semi-final and final on 23 March 2010, Germany was drawn as one of the five wildcards and therefore the country chose to perform in position 22 in the final, following the entry from Armenia and before the entry from Portugal.

The German performance featured Lena performing on stage in a short black dress with four backing vocalists. The stage was predominantly dark with flickering blue lights and additional turning spotlights along with small blue bubbles hanging from the ceiling. The four backing vocalists that joined Lena on stage were Anji Hinke, Cheri Kedida, Grace Risch and Maya Saban. Germany won the contest placing first with a score of 246 points. This was Germany's second victory in the Eurovision Song Contest; their first victory was in 1982.

=== Voting ===
Voting during the three shows consisted of 50 percent public televoting and 50 percent from a jury deliberation. The jury consisted of five music industry professionals who were citizens of the country they represent: Jochen Rausch, Mary Roos, Hadnet Tesfai, Johannes Oerding and jury president Hape Kerkeling.

This jury was asked to judge each contestant based on: vocal capacity; the stage performance; the song's composition and originality; and the overall impression by the act. In addition, no member of a national jury could be related in any way to any of the competing acts in such a way that they cannot vote impartially and independently.

Following the release of the full split voting by the EBU after the conclusion of the competition, it was revealed that Germany had placed first with both the public televote and the jury vote. In the public vote, Germany scored 243 points and in the jury vote the nation scored 187 points.

Below is a breakdown of points awarded to Germany and awarded by Germany in the first semi-final and final of the contest. The nation awarded its 12 points to Belgium in the semi-final and the final of the contest.

==== Points awarded to Germany ====
Points awarded to Germany (Final)
| Score | Country |
|---|---|
| 12 points | Denmark; Estonia; Finland; Latvia; Norway; Slovakia; Spain; Sweden; Switzerland |
| 10 points | Albania; Belgium; Lithuania; Slovenia; Turkey |
| 8 points | Bosnia and Herzegovina; Ireland; Macedonia; Serbia |
| 7 points | Poland |
| 6 points | Croatia; Russia |
| 5 points | Ukraine |
| 4 points | Cyprus; Malta; Netherlands; United Kingdom |
| 3 points | Bulgaria; France; Iceland; Romania |
| 2 points | Greece |
| 1 point | Azerbaijan; Portugal |

==== Points awarded by Germany ====
Points awarded by Germany (Semi-final 1)
| Score | Country |
|---|---|
| 12 points | Belgium |
| 10 points | Portugal |
| 8 points | Greece |
| 7 points | Poland |
| 6 points | Iceland |
| 5 points | Albania |
| 4 points | Serbia |
| 3 points | Finland |
| 2 points | Malta |
| 1 point | Russia |

Points awarded by Germany (Final)
| Score | Country |
|---|---|
| 12 points | Belgium |
| 10 points | Turkey |
| 8 points | Greece |
| 7 points | Armenia |
| 6 points | Portugal |
| 5 points | Serbia |
| 4 points | Iceland |
| 3 points | France |
| 2 points | Ireland |
| 1 point | Albania |
