= I Care for You (Jennifer Braun song) =

Single by Jennifer Braun
- Released: 13 March 2010
- Recorded: 2010
- Genre: Pop
- Length: 3:24
- Label: USFO, Universal
- Songwriters: Martin "Fly" Fliegenschmidt, Claudio Pagonis, Max Mutzke

Jennifer Braun singles chronology
"Satellite" (2010)	"I Care for You" (2010)

"I Care for You" is a song by German singer Jennifer Braun. It was one of three songs performed by Braun in the final of Unser Star für Oslo ("Our Star for Oslo"), the national pre-selection programme for Germany's entry to the Eurovision Song Contest 2010. However, the audience chose Braun's contender Lena Meyer-Landrut and her version of "Satellite" for the contest in Oslo. "I Care for You" was made available for digital download on 13 March 2010 and is also featured on Braun's maxi single "I Care for You". The song subsequently charted in Germany and Austria, reaching peak positions of #10 and #68 respectively.

== Chart performance ==
Chart (2010)	Peak position
German Singles Chart	10
Austrian Singles Chart	68
