= Love Me (Lena Meyer-Landrut song) =

Song by Lena

from the album My Cassette Player
- Released: 13 March 2010
- Recorded: 2010
- Genre: Pop
- Length: 2:59
- Label: USFO, Universal Music Germany
- Songwriters: Lena Meyer-Landrut, Stefan Raab

"Love Me" is a song by German singer Lena Meyer-Landrut, co-written by her and entertainer Stefan Raab. It was one of three songs performed by Meyer-Landrut in the final of Unser Star für Oslo (Our Star for Oslo), the national pre-selection programme for Germany's entry to the Eurovision Song Contest 2010. However, the audience chose "Satellite" to be her designated song for the contest in Oslo. "Love Me" was made available for digital download on 13 March 2010 and is also featured on Meyer-Landrut's maxi single "Satellite". The song subsequently charted in Germany, Austria and Switzerland, reaching peak positions of No. 4, #28 and No. 39 respectively.

"Love Me" is from Meyer-Landrut's debut album My Cassette Player, which was released on 7 May 2010.

== Track listing ==
Digital release
No.	Title	Writer(s)	Producer(s)	Length
1.	"Love Me"	Stefan Raab, Lena Meyer-Landrut	Raab	2:59

== Credits and personnel ==
- Lead vocals – Lena Meyer-Landrut
- Producers – Stefan Raab
- Music – Stefan Raab
- Lyrics – Lena Meyer-Landrut
- Label: USFO for Universal Deutschland

== Chart performance ==
Chart (2010)	Peak position
Austria (Ö3 Austria Top 40)	28
Germany (GfK)	4
Switzerland (Schweizer Hitparade)	39
