= List of number-one hits of 2010 (Germany) =

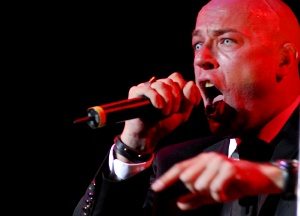
Iz's "Over the Rainbow" became the best-performing single of 2010, while Unheilig's (pictured) "Große Freiheit" became the best-performing album of the year.

The Media Control charts are record charts compiled by Media Control on behalf of the German record industry. They include the "Single Top 100" and the "Album Top 100" chart. The chart week runs from Friday to Thursday, and the chart compilations are published on Tuesday for the record industry. The entire top 100 singles and top 100 albums are officially released the following Friday by Media Control. The charts are based on sales of physical singles and albums from retail outlets as well as permanent music downloads. Robbie Williams is the only artist who has had three different number albums in a year in Germany—Reality Killed the Video Star hit the top of the charts in January, his greatest hits album In and Out of Consciousness: The Greatest Hits 1990–2010 hit number 1 in October, and Progress, on which he sang as a member of Take That, hit number 1 in December.

== Number-one hits by week ==
Key
†	Indicates best-performing single and album of 2010

Issue date	Single	Artist	Ref.	Album	Artist	Ref.
1 January	"I Will Love You Monday (365)"	Aura Dione		Reality Killed the Video Star	Robbie Williams	
8 January	"I Like"	Keri Hilson		The Fame/The Fame Monster	Lady Gaga	
15 January	"Bad Romance"	Lady Gaga		The Fame/The Fame Monster	Lady Gaga	
22 January	"I Like"	Keri Hilson		The Fame/The Fame Monster	Lady Gaga	
29 January	"Tik Tok"	Ke$ha		The Fame/The Fame Monster	Lady Gaga	
5 February	"Tik Tok"	Ke$ha		Schall & Wahn	Tocotronic	
12 February	"Tik Tok"	Ke$ha		Tattoos	Peter Maffay	
19 February	"Tik Tok"	Ke$ha		Tattoos	Peter Maffay	
26 February	"Tik Tok"	Ke$ha		Tattoos	Peter Maffay	
5 March	"Tik Tok"	Ke$ha		Große Freiheit †	Unheilig	
12 March	"Alors on danse"	Stromae		Große Freiheit †	Unheilig	
19 March	"Alors on danse"	Stromae		Große Freiheit †	Unheilig	
26 March	"Satellite"	Lena		A Curious Thing	Amy Macdonald	
2 April	"Satellite"	Lena		A Curious Thing	Amy Macdonald	
9 April	"Satellite"	Lena		A Curious Thing	Amy Macdonald	
16 April	"Satellite"	Lena		Große Freiheit†	Unheilig	
23 April	"Satellite"	Lena		Diversity	Gentleman	
30 April	"Don't Believe"	Mehrzad Marashi		Iron Man 2 (Soundtrack)	AC/DC	
7 May	"Don't Believe"	Mehrzad Marashi		Große Freiheit†	Unheilig	
14 May	"Don't Believe"	Mehrzad Marashi		Große Freiheit†	Unheilig	
21 May	"Don't Believe"	Mehrzad Marashi		My Cassette Player	Lena	
28 May	"Wavin' Flag"	K'naan		Für dich immer noch Fanta Sie	Die Fantastischen Vier	
4 June	"Wavin' Flag"	K'naan		My Cassette Player	Lena	
11 June	"Satellite"	Lena		My Cassette Player	Lena	
18 June	"Wavin' Flag"	K'naan		My Cassette Player	Lena	
25 June	"Waka Waka (This Time for Africa)"	Shakira featuring Freshlyground		Große Freiheit†	Unheilig	
2 July	"Waka Waka (This Time for Africa)"	Shakira featuring Freshlyground		Große Freiheit†	Unheilig	
9 July	"Waka Waka (This Time for Africa)"	Shakira featuring Freshlyground		Große Freiheit†	Unheilig	
16 July	"Waka Waka (This Time for Africa)"	Shakira featuring Freshlyground		Große Freiheit†	Unheilig	
23 July	"Waka Waka (This Time for Africa)"	Shakira featuring Freshlyground		Große Freiheit†	Unheilig	
30 July	"Waka Waka (This Time for Africa)"	Shakira featuring Freshlyground		Große Freiheit†	Unheilig	
6 August	"We No Speak Americano"	Yolanda Be Cool & DCUP		Große Freiheit†	Unheilig	
13 August	"We No Speak Americano"	Yolanda Be Cool & DCUP		Große Freiheit†	Unheilig	
20 August	"We No Speak Americano"	Yolanda Be Cool & DCUP		Große Freiheit†	Unheilig	
27 August	"We No Speak Americano"	Yolanda Be Cool & DCUP		The Final Frontier	Iron Maiden	
3 September	"We No Speak Americano"	Yolanda Be Cool & DCUP		Große Freiheit†	Unheilig	
10 September	"We No Speak Americano"	Yolanda Be Cool & DCUP		Bring mich nach Hause	Wir sind Helden	
17 September	"We No Speak Americano"	Yolanda Be Cool & DCUP		Große Freiheit†	Unheilig	
24 September	"Love the Way You Lie"	Eminem featuring Rihanna		A Thousand Suns	Linkin Park	
1 October	"Love the Way You Lie"	Eminem featuring Rihanna		A Thousand Suns	Linkin Park	
8 October	"Somewhere Over the Rainbow/What a Wonderful World" †	Israel "IZ" Kamakawiwoʻole		Rock Symphonies	David Garrett	
15 October	"Somewhere Over the Rainbow/What a Wonderful World" †	Israel "IZ" Kamakawiwoʻole		Hard Knocks	Joe Cocker	
22 October	"Somewhere Over the Rainbow/What a Wonderful World" †	Israel "IZ" Kamakawiwoʻole		In and Out of Consciousness: The Greatest Hits 1990–2010	Robbie Williams	
29 October	"Somewhere Over the Rainbow/What a Wonderful World" †	Israel "IZ" Kamakawiwoʻole		Come Around Sundown	Kings of Leon	
5 November	"Somewhere Over the Rainbow/What a Wonderful World" †	Israel "IZ" Kamakawiwoʻole		Schwerelos	Andrea Berg	
12 November	"Somewhere Over the Rainbow/What a Wonderful World" †	Israel "IZ" Kamakawiwoʻole		Schwerelos	Andrea Berg	
19 November	"Somewhere Over the Rainbow/What a Wonderful World" †	Israel "IZ" Kamakawiwoʻole		Tour of the Universe: Barcelona 20/21.11.09	Depeche Mode	
26 November	"Somewhere Over the Rainbow/What a Wonderful World" †	Israel "IZ" Kamakawiwoʻole		The Promise	Bruce Springsteen	
3 December	"Somewhere Over the Rainbow/What a Wonderful World" †	Israel "IZ" Kamakawiwoʻole		Progress	Take That	
10 December	"We Are the People"	Empire of the Sun		Große Freiheit†	Unheilig	
17 December	"Somewhere Over the Rainbow/What a Wonderful World" †	Israel "IZ" Kamakawiwoʻole		Große Freiheit†	Unheilig	
24 December	"Somewhere Over the Rainbow/What a Wonderful World" †	Israel "IZ" Kamakawiwoʻole		Michael	Michael Jackson	
31 December	"Somewhere Over the Rainbow/What a Wonderful World" †	Israel "IZ" Kamakawiwoʻole		Große Freiheit†	Unheilig	

== See also ==
- List of number-one hits (Germany)
- List of German airplay number-one songs
