= Rosi Golan =

Israeli singer-songwriter

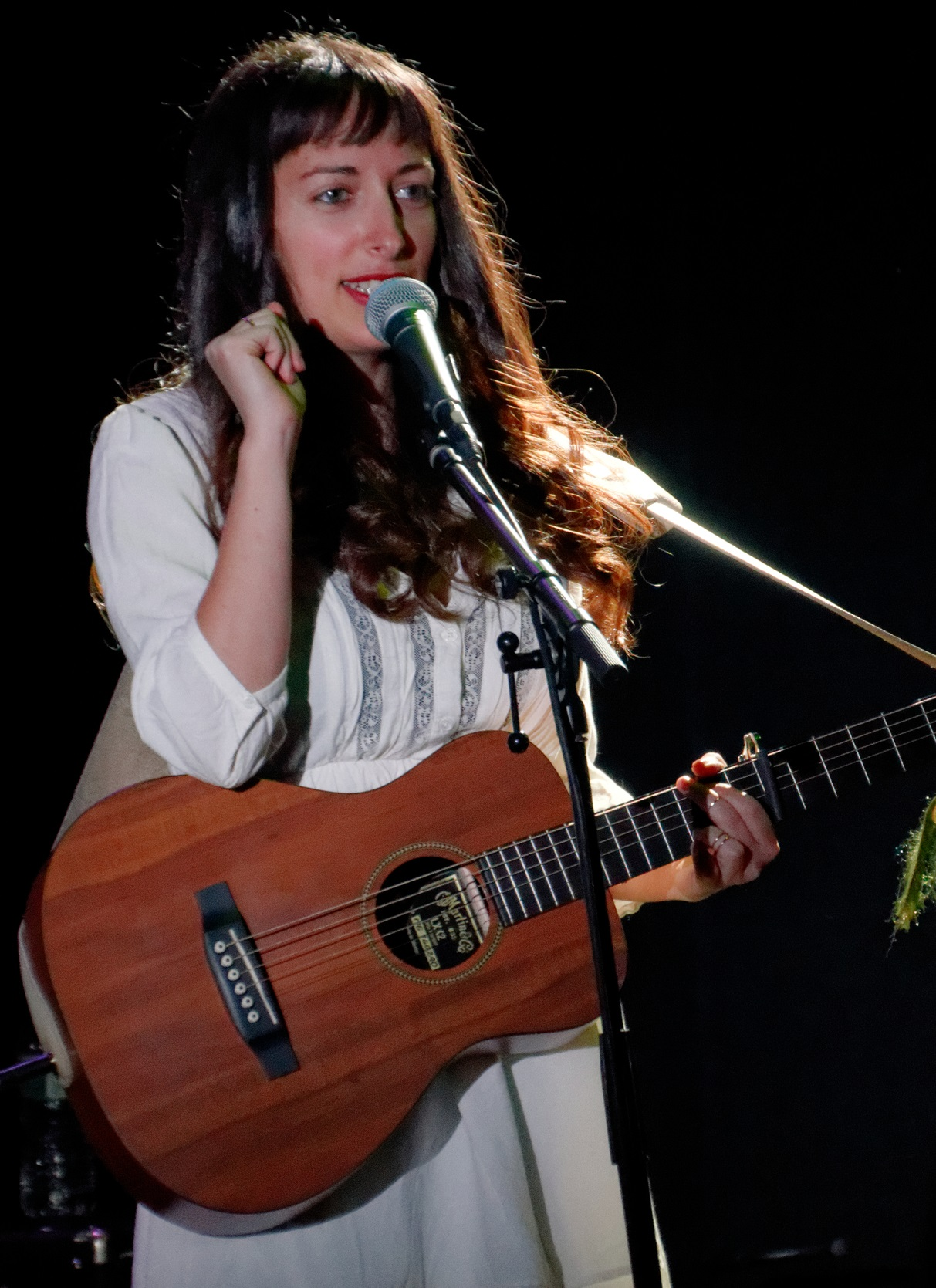
- Golan performing in 2014

Background information
- Born: Rosi Golan
- Origin: Israel
- Genres: Folk
- Occupations: Musician, singer-songwriter
- Instruments: Vocals, guitar, piano
- Years active: 2005–present
- Label: Gypsy Betch (2008–current)
- Website: www.rosigolan.com

Rosi Golan is an Israeli singer-songwriter. Since 2008 she has released two LPs (Lead Balloon and The Drifter & the Gypsy) and two EPs (Fortuna and Collecting Bullets). Her songs have been featured in feature films such as Dear John and Tiger Eyes, TV shows such as Vampire Diaries, Grey's Anatomy, Private Practice, Brothers & Sisters, One Tree Hill, Ghost Whisperer, and numerous commercials.

== History ==
Golan was born in Israel, also living in Germany and Paris before finally settling in Los Angeles at the age of nine.

Golan began songwriting in Los Angeles after purchasing her first guitar. Soon after, she began performing open mics around the city. In 2003, Golan moved to New York City to begin recording her first demos, promoting through Myspace. She also began collaborating with other songwriters during this time. One of those early collaborations was with UK songwriter Jamie Hartman. Their song “Let Me Out” was first released in the UK by EMI and was Rosi’s first single. It was nominated for the Ivor Novello Award for Best Song. In 2006, Rosi became the winner of the first ASCAP Robert Allen Award for songwriting excellence, she was recognized at the annual ASCAP awards show at Lincoln Center for the Performing Arts.

In 2007, while Rosi was continuing to collaborate and write the songs that would eventually become her debut LP, she landed the coveted worldwide theme for Pantene with her song "Shine". The song replaced the long-running previous theme "Unwritten" by Natasha Bedingfield.

On November 18, 2008, Golan released her debut LP, "The Drifter & the Gypsy". The Marshall Altman-produced LP was independently released on Rosi's own label, Gypsy Betch.

In 2009, Golan began touring through 2010, including headline dates as well as supporting such artists as William Fitzsimmons, Greg Laswell, Ari Hest and Jay Nash.

In 2010, Golan wrote "Bee" which went on to become top three on the German Charts.

On September 27, 2011 Golan released her second LP "Lead Balloon", again on her own label Gypsy Betch and produced by Tony Berg and featuring collaborators Iain Archer, Johnny McDaid, Natalie Hemby and Boots Ottestad. The album also features Snow Patrol's Gary Lightbody on "Everything Is Brilliant" and guitarist David Rawlings on "Flicker." Rosi toured the U.S. as well as Europe as and supported artists such as Joshua Radin and Wakey!Wakey!.

“Can't Go Back" from Golan's "Lead Balloon" LP was later recorded by Little Big Town for their fifth studio album, Tornado.

On October 15, 2013 Rosi Golan released her Fortuna EP, produced by Ian Fitchuk and recorded in Nashville over a two-week period in the summer of 2013. Fortuna debuted at #8 on iTunes singer-songwriter chart.

In 2017, Golan entered her "Dylan goes electric period" by releasing her pop EP, titled "Collecting Bullets."

In 2020 Golan penned "Loyal, Brave, True" for the live action Disney film, Mulan which was performed by Christina Aguilera and co written by Jamie Hartman, Billy Crabtree and Harry Gregson-Willioms.

== Albums ==
- The Drifter and The Gypsy (November 18, 2008)
- Little Apple (Side project with Ari Hest – September 27, 2011)
- Lead Balloon (September 27, 2011)
- Fortuna EP (October 15, 2013)
- Collecting Bullets EP (July 14, 2017)

== Singles ==
- "Shine" (July 7, 2008)
- "Follow The Arrow" (November 10, 2009)
- "If You Stay" (January 2, 2013)
- "לב אֶמת אַמיץ ונאמן" (September 25, 2020)
