= Julie Frost =

American musician

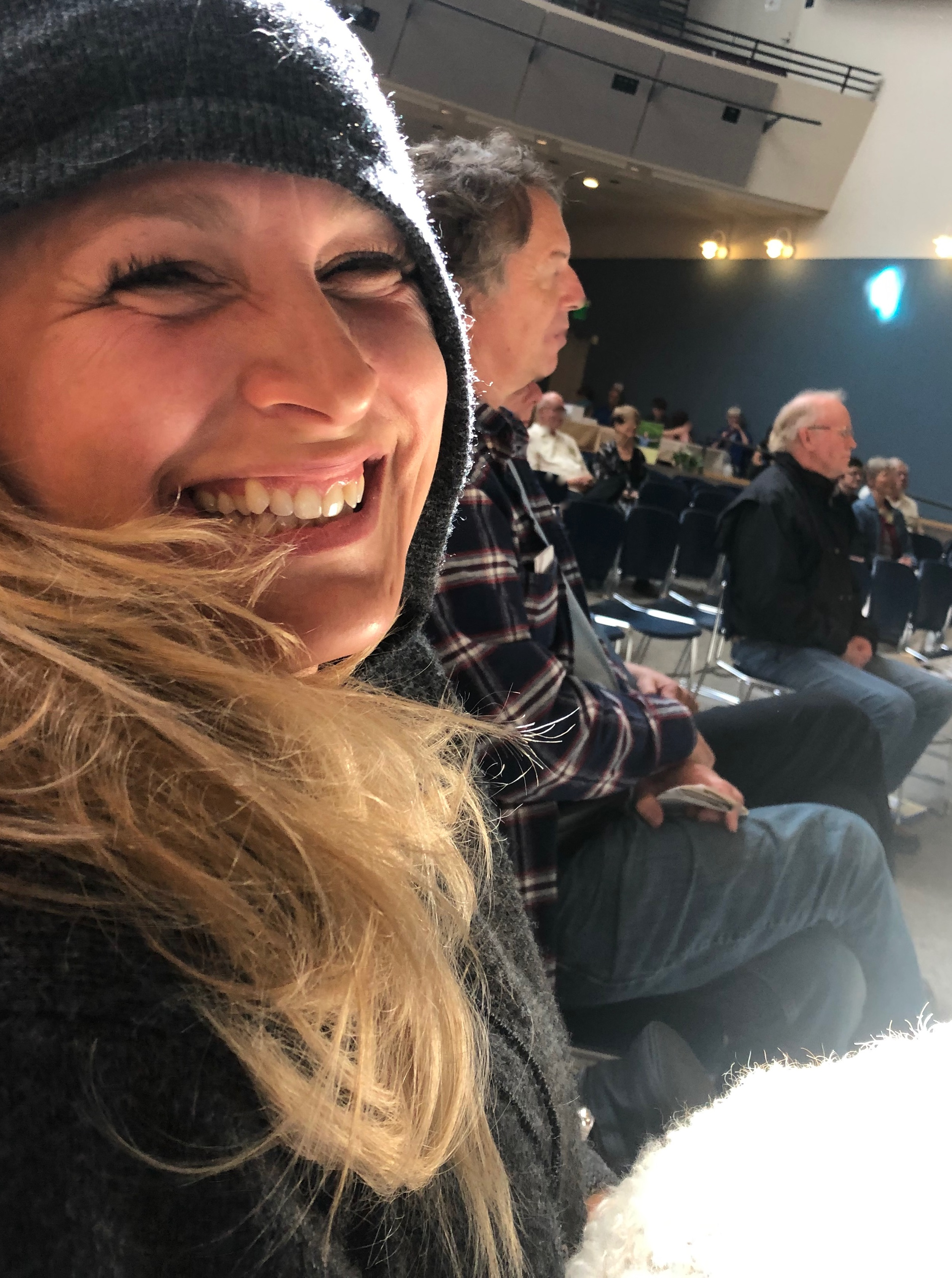
- Frost in 2019

Background information
- Origin: Oklahoma, U.S.
- Genres: Pop; pop rock; R&B
- Occupations: Songwriter; singer; guitarist; record producer
- Years active: 2002–present
- Labels: EMI Music Publishing, Sony/ATV

Julie Frost is an American songwriter, singer, guitarist and record producer. She is the recipient of Golden Globe and Eurovision Song Contest awards for songs written, as well as a Parent's Choice Award for album production and performance. She is also the founder of the non-profit "Songs For Elephants", with the mission to help mobilize the music and entertainment industry in support of the world's elephants.

She is the second American songwriter to win the Eurovision Song Contest, as co-writer of the song "Satellite", which won the contest for Germany. Frost co-wrote Madonna's song "Masterpiece", from the soundtrack of her movie W.E., and won a Golden Globe Award for Best Original Song.

Her songwriting credits include the Black Eyed Peas' multi-platinum single "Just Can't Get Enough", the hook for Pitbull's "Castle Made of Sand", and Flo Rida's "Sweet Spot". She also co-wrote Beyoncé's single "Countdown", Ed Sheeran's "Kiss Me", Marina and the Diamonds's "Primadonna", Frost wrote the end credit song and lead single for the "Endless Love" Soundtrack performed by Tegan and Sara and co-wrote "Lift Me Up" featuring Nico and Vinz and Ladysmith Black Mambazo on Guetta's album "Listen", and co-wrote Charlie Puth's single "Marvin Gaye" with Charlie Puth featuring Meghan Trainor. Additionally, Frost co-wrote the single "Obsession" for DJ Vice Featuring Kyle and Jon Bellion. Most recently, she co-wrote "Ring" for Selena Gomez album "Rare", and "Oh My God" for Alec Benjamin's album "These Two Windows". She is nominated for a 2020 Latin Grammy Award with her song "Love" cowritten with Jesse & Joy, on their album "Aire".

== Early life and career ==
Frost grew up in rural Vermont and began to perform publicly in 1992 in Chicago. Her first solo album The Wave (2002) was received positively by various music critics;... Of her writing style, Music Critic Johny Luftus wrote "Chicago singer/songwriter Julie Frost likes to place pleading heartache, clever wordplay, and determined pluck over nuanced arrangements". Later on Frost founded her own studio "Happy Child Studios", which produces songs for families and children, and published her album Happy Child Music (2006).

== 2009 to present ==
Frost was signed to EMI Music Publishing in 2009 by music executive Big Jon Platt. In 2010, a song cowritten by Frost and Dane John Gorden, "Satellite", won the Eurovision Song Contest 2010 for Germany. Lena Meyer-Landrut's recording of this song subsequently became a number one hit in various European countries, and went to No. 1 on the European singles chart. It was also a minor hit in various other countries.

== Discography ==
- 2006: Happy Child Music (Artist)
- 2002: The Wave (Artist)
- 2000: "Songs for Wiggleworms" Various Artists (Artist/Producer)

== Songwriting credits ==
Year	Artist	Album	Song	Chart performance
2010	Lena Meyer-Landrut	My Cassette Player	Satellite	European Hot 100 singles No. 1, German Singles Chart No. 1 Winner of Eurovision Song Contest 2010
2010	Black Eyed Peas	The Beginning	Just Can't Get Enough	UK Singles Chart No. 2, US Billboard Hot 100 No. 3. Multiplatinum
2011	Cody Simpson	Coast To Coast	On My Mind	Radio Disney U.S. No. 1, Billboard U.S. pop songs No. 30
2011	Beyoncé	4	Countdown	US Billboard R&B/Hip Hop Songs No. 12, US Billboard 200 No. 1, US Top R&B/Hip-Hop Albums No. 1
2011	Pitbull feat. Kelly Rowland & Jamie Drastik	Planet Pit	Castle Made of Sand	US Billboard 200 No. 7, US Top R&B/Hip-Hop Albums No. 3, US Top Rap Albums No. 2
2011	Ed Sheeran	+	Kiss Me	UK Albums chart No. 1, Ireland Album chart No. 2, US Billboard 200 No. 5 US Folk Albums No. 1 US Rock Albums No. 2
2011	Madonna	W.E., MDNA	Masterpiece	Golden Globe for Best Original Song, UK Albums Chart No. 1 US Billboard 200 No. 1 US Dance/Electronic Albums No. 1
2011	Dia Frampton	"Red"	Don't Kick The Chair	US Billboard Top Heatseekers Albums No. 1
2012	Marina and the Diamonds	Electra Heart	Primadonna	UK Singles Chart No. 11, UK Album Charts No. 1
2012	Mandy Capristo	Grace	Allow Me	German Album Charts No. 8
2012	Flo Rida feat. Jennifer Lopez	Wild Ones	Sweet Spot	US Billboard 200 No. 14, US Billboard Dance/Electronic Album No. 1, US Billboard Rap Albums No. 2
2012	Stefanie Heinzmann	Stefanie Heinzmann	Show Me the Way	German Album Charts No. 8
2013	La Fouine feat Zaho	Drôle de parcours	Ma meilleure (featuring Zaho)	Trace Urban Music Awards "Best Album", "Best Collaboration", French Singles Charts No. 23
2014	Tegan and Sara	Soundtrack "Endless Love"	Don't Find Another Love	
2014	Sabrina Carpenter	Can't Blame A Girl For Trying	Best Thing I Got	US Billboard Top Heatseekers No. 16
2014	David Guetta, Nico and Vinz, Ladysmith Black Mambazo	Listen	Lift Me Up	US Top Dance/Electronic Albums (Billboard) #1
2015	Charlie Puth, Meghan Trainor	Some Type of Love (EP)	Marvin Gaye	Billboard US Mainstream Top 40 No. 15, Billboard US Adult Top 40 No. 12, Billboard US Adult Contemporary No. 27, US Billboard Hot 100 No. 21, UK Singles No. 1, Switzerland No. 2, Spain No. 3, Scotland No. 1, New Zealand No. 1, Israel No. 1, Ireland No. 1, France No. 1, Billboard Euro Digital Song Sales No. 1, Australia No. 1
2017	Jon Bellion, Kyle (musician), DJ Vice	Non Album Single	Obsession	
2018	Daughtry	Cage to Rattle	Deep End	
2018	Alec Benjamin	Narrated For You	Swim	
2018	Alec Benjamin	Non Album Single	O.I.N.V	
2018	Alec Benjamin	Non Album Single	Last of Her Kind	
2020	Selena Gomez	Rare	Ring	Billboard 200 #1
2020	Alec Benjamin	These Two Windows	Oh My God	Billboard Mainstream Top 40 No. 32
2025	Ive	Ive Secret	XOXZ	

== Awards, nominations and certifications ==
=== Wins ===
- 2001: Parent's Choice Award - "Songs For Wiggle Worms" (Producer)
- 2010: Eurovision Song Contest - "Satellite"
- 2010: 1LIVE Krone – Best Single "Satellite"
- 2011: Golden Globe - Best Original Song "Masterpiece" (Madonna)

=== Nominations ===
- 2011: Echo - Radio Echo for "Satellite" (Lena Meyer-Landrut)
- 2011: Echo - Single of the Year – "Satellite" (Lena Meyer-Landrut)
- 2011: Echo - Album of the Year – "My Cassette Player" (Lena Meyer-Landrut)
- 2011: Comet - Best Song – "Satellite" (Lena Meyer-Landrut)
- 2012: Brit - Album of the Year – "+" (Ed Sheeran)

=== Certifications ===
- 2010 Triple Platinum Single Germany "Satellite" Lena Meyer-Landrut
- 2010 Gold Single Sweden "Satellite" Lena Meyer-Landrut
- 2010 Platinum Single Switzerland "Satellite" Lena Meyer-Landrut
- 2010 5× Gold Album Germany My Cassette Player Lena Meyer-Landrut
- 2011 Platinum Album U.S. "The Beginning" Black Eyed Peas
- 2011 Platinum Album Australia "The Beginning" Black Eyed Peas
- 2011 Platinum Single Australia "Just Can't Get Enough" Black Eyed Peas
