= Per Kristian Ottestad =

Norwegian musician

Per Kristian "Boots" Ottestad (born February 11, 1968) is a Norwegian singer, musician, composer, and songwriter.

In 1985, when he was 17, he and his friend Ole Paulsen set up a music duo 2 Brave. (Their collaboration started in 1982, when they played with other bands.) They released a single "Get It Out Body And Soul" in 1985 and a single "Stop That Girl" in 1988. In debuted at # 100 at UK Top 100 that year. Next year it was on the chart for seven weeks, peaking #71. In 1989 they released one more single, "Boys And Girls", with little success. In 1990 they recorded their debut album, "Big Time Beat", with the participation of some well-known names. It was not a sales success. After that they disbanded. Among other thing, they started writing music for others. In 1994 he and his friends from Stavanger started the band The Getaway People, where he was the lead vocalist. At this time he got his nickname "Boots".

He has also written and/or produced songs for several artists including Robbie Williams, Tim McGraw, Andy Grammer, Macy Gray, Lena, Katharine McPhee and others. Among his most successful songs are "Come Undone" by Robbie Williams (#4 UK) and "Bee" by Lena (#3 Germany).

In 2004 he released a solo album, titled Ottestad.

In 2024, the song "Rain down on me" he wrote for Thomas Dybdahl was included in the list "The 100 best Norwegian hit songs ever" published by Nettavisen
