= Lena Meyer-Landrut =

German singer (born 1991)

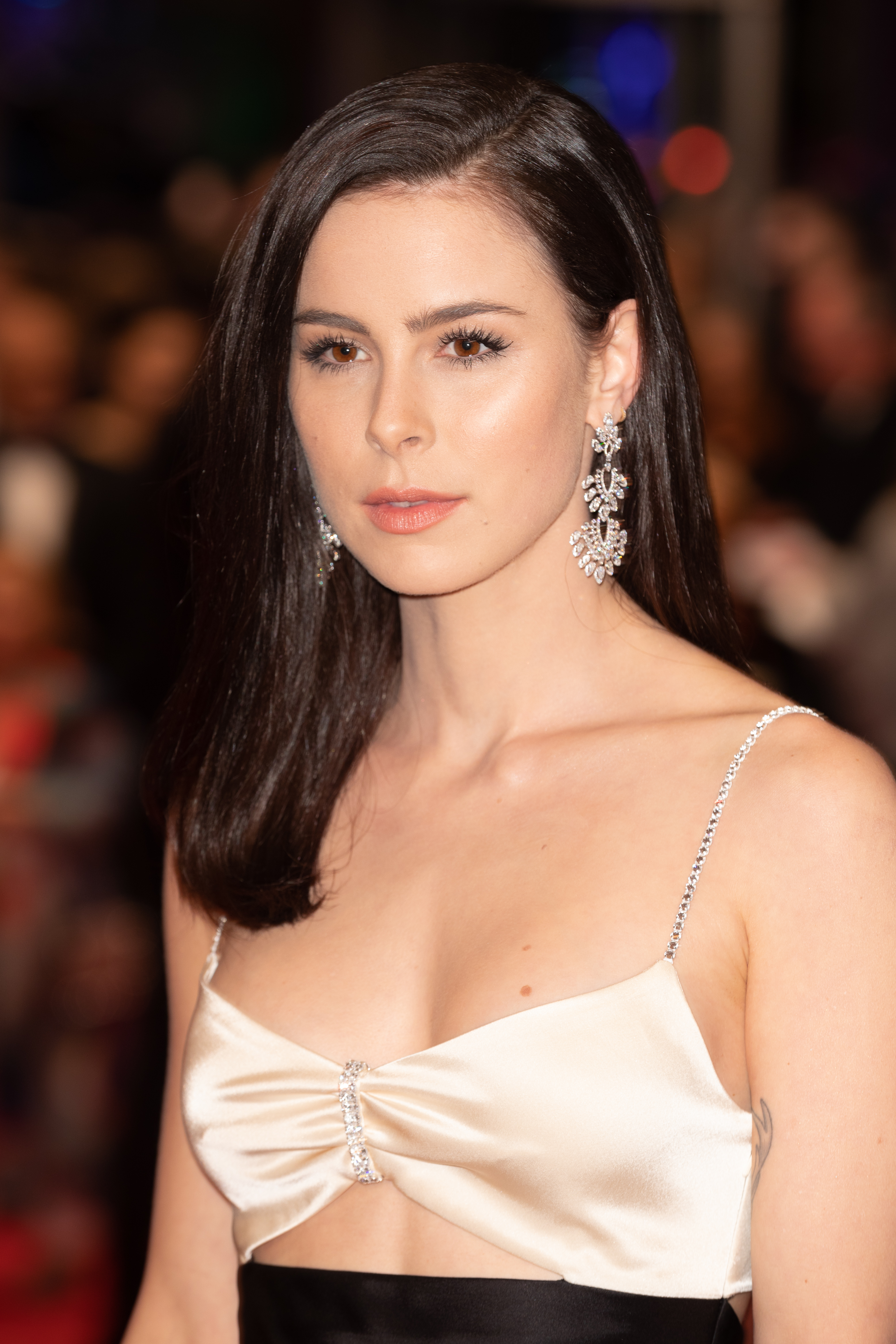
- Lena Meyer-Landrut in 2020
- Born: Lena Johanna Therese Meyer-Landrut; 23 May 1991 (age 35); Hanover, Lower Saxony, Germany
- Occupations: Singer; songwriter; voice actress
- Years active: 2010–present
- Spouse: Mark Forster
- Relatives: Andreas Meyer-Landrut (grandfather); Nikolaus Meyer-Landrut (first cousin once removed)
- Awards: Full list
- Musical career
- Genres: Pop; indie pop; electronic
- Instrument: Vocals
- Labels: USFO; We Love Music; Universal Music Germany
- Website: lena-meyer-landrut.de

Lena Johanna Therese Meyer-Landrut (German: [ˈleːna joˈhana teˈʁeːzə ˈmaɪɐ ˈlantʁuːt]; born 23 May 1991), also known by the mononym Lena, is a German singer. She rose to fame after representing Germany in the Eurovision Song Contest 2010 in Oslo, winning the event with the song "Satellite". Both "Satellite" and her debut album My Cassette Player (2010) debuted at number one in Germany and became platinum sellers. With her three entries from the German national final Unser Star für Oslo, Meyer-Landrut set an all-time chart record in her home country by debuting with three songs in the top five of the German Singles Chart. She represented Germany for the second consecutive time in the Eurovision Song Contest 2011 in Düsseldorf with the song "Taken by a Stranger", finishing in tenth place.

Meyer-Landrut followed this with a series of successful albums, including Good News (2011), Stardust (2012), Crystal Sky (2015) and Only Love, L (2019), all of which entered the top two of the German Albums Chart. Several singles from these albums became top ten hits on the pop charts throughout German-speaking Europe, including "Stardust" and "Wild & Free". One of the best-selling female German artists to emerge in the early 2010s, Meyer-Landrut has won several high-profile prizes as a recording artist such as the 1LIVE Krone, a Comet, the Radio Regenbogen Award, three Echo Music Awards, and five MTV Europe Music Awards.

Beyond her music career, Meyer-Landrut has been featured as a coach on nine seasons of the reality competition television series The Voice Kids as well as an expert panel member for the Eurovision Song Contest on several occasions. In 2017, she joined the cast of the fourth season of Sing meinen Song – Das Tauschkonzert, the German version of the series The Best Singers whose accompanying compilation album topped the Austrian and German Albums Chart. In addition, Meyer-Landrut has also voiced characters in audiobooks and animated films, including A Turtle's Tale (2010), Tarzan (2013), Trolls (2016), and Wonder Park (2019), and has been a brand ambassador for L'Oréal hair coloring and skin care products.

== Early life ==
Lena Meyer-Landrut was born in Hanover, Germany, on 23 May 1991. She is the granddaughter of Andreas Meyer-Landrut, the Baltic German-born West German ambassador to the Soviet Union in Moscow from 1980 to 1983 and 1987 to 1989, and Hanna Karatsony von Hodos who was born in Bratislava, Slovakia of Hungarian nobility. She grew up as an only child, and started taking dancing lessons at the age of five; initially doing ballet and later practicing various modern styles, including hip-hop and jazz dance. Meyer-Landrut grew fond of singing and appeared as an extra in several German television series, though she never received any formal acting or vocal training. In June 2010, she graduated from IGS Roderbruch Hannover, a comprehensive school, receiving her Abitur diploma.

== Career ==
=== 2009–2011: Eurovision Song Contest ===
Meyer-Landrut decided to take part in the talent show Unser Star für Oslo, a newly created national television programme to select the German entry for the Eurovision Song Contest 2010. The show was organised by public broadcaster ARD and private television station ProSieben, as well as entertainer, music producer and former Eurovision entrant Stefan Raab. From 4,500 entrants, Meyer-Landrut was picked as one of the 20 contestants for the show. Asked about her motivation to apply, she said, "I like to test myself. I wanted to see how I am perceived, and I wanted to hear what people with knowledge have to say about it. I personally can't judge myself at all." After her first appearance, performing "My Same" by British singer Adele, Meyer-Landrut received much praise from the show's jury panel and was instantly considered the favourite. The following week, Adele's "My Same" entered the German singles chart at number 61. Meyer-Landrut reached the final of Unser Star für Oslo, mainly performing lesser-known songs by international artists The Bird and the Bee, Kate Nash, Paolo Nutini and Lisa Mitchell. Of her eight cover performances, five of the original songs subsequently charted in Germany, with all but "Foundations" reaching their peak chart position. In the final, on 12 March 2010, Meyer-Landrut sang three songs specifically written for the contest, "Bee", "Satellite" and "Love Me". Through televoting the audience chose "Satellite", written by American Julie Frost and Dane John Gordon, to be her designated song in the event she won the show. In a second round of voting Meyer-Landrut was chosen as Germany's entry for the 55th Eurovision Song Contest, beating the last remaining contestant, Jennifer Braun.

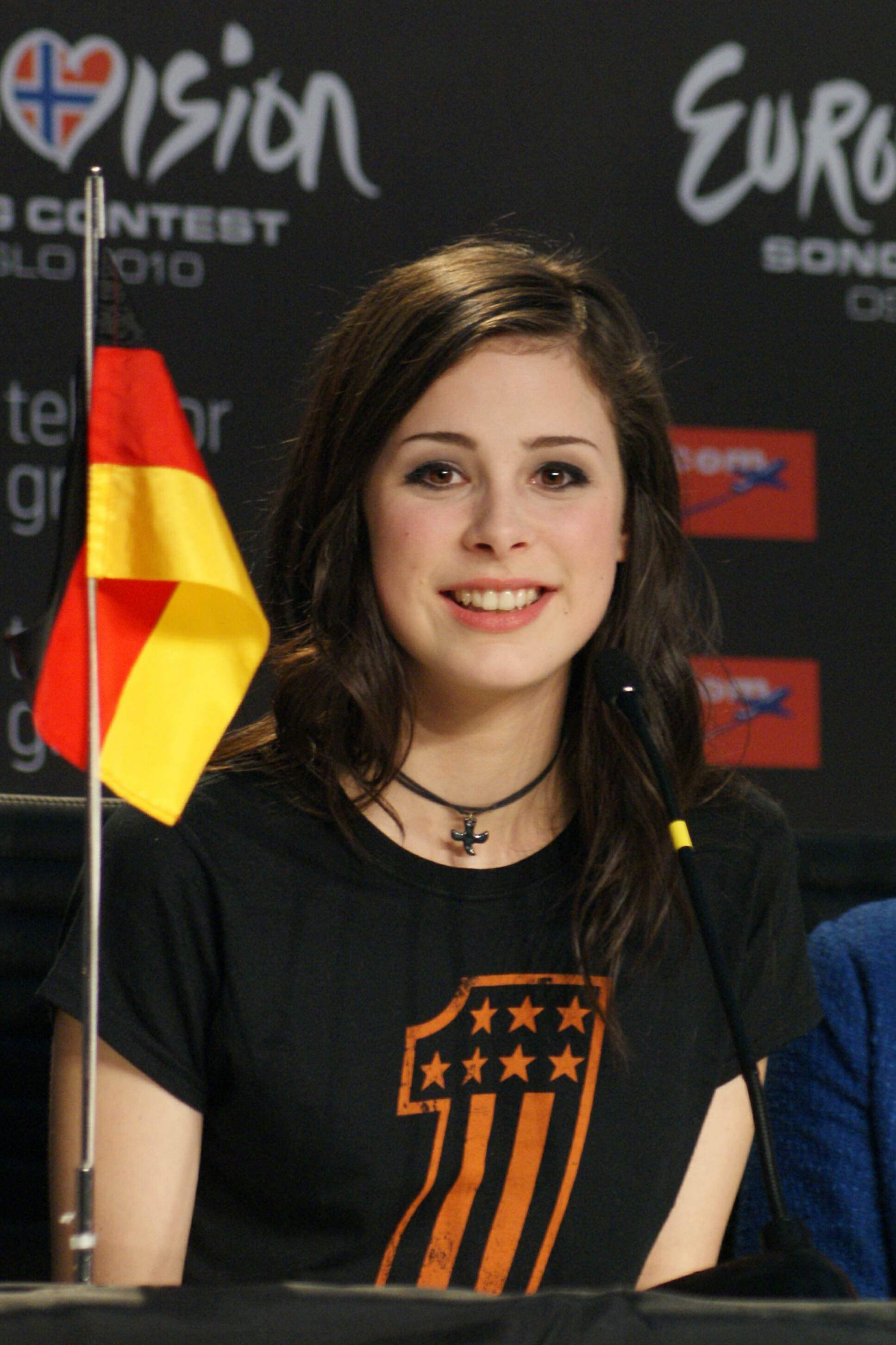
Meyer-Landrut at the press conference after her victory at the ESC 2010

Throughout the show, Meyer-Landrut was seen as the clear favourite. One day after winning Unser Star für Oslo, her three songs from the finals topped the German iTunes Store sales chart, making her the first singer to accomplish this. "Satellite" sold over 100,000 downloads in its first week, becoming Germany's fastest-selling digital release ever. Her three songs entered the top five of the German singles chart reaching positions one, three and four. No artist had achieved this since the charts were first established in Germany in 1959. "Satellite" was certified gold after the first week and platinum after the fourth week of its release. The song remained at number one for five consecutive weeks in Germany. The music video for "Satellite" was shot during the night of the final and premiered on German television stations four days later. While competing at Unser Star für Oslo, Meyer-Landrut continued to attend school. The last show was held one month before the start of her final exams. Following them she released her debut album, My Cassette Player, on 7 May 2010. Produced by Stefan Raab, it includes the singles "Satellite", "Love Me" and "Bee", as well as two cover songs and eight unreleased titles. Meyer-Landrut is credited as a co-writer for the lyrics of five songs. The album debuted at number one on the German albums chart. It peaked at number one on the Austrian albums chart, and at number three on the Swiss albums chart. "Satellite" has been certified double Platinum, and the album has been certified five times Gold for sales of over 500,000 units.

Representing a "Big Four" country, Meyer-Landrut automatically qualified for the final of the Eurovision Song Contest 2010. Germany received a wild card during the running order draw, allowing the German representatives to choose the country's position for the final. They chose position 22 out of the 25 spots. Meyer-Landrut arrived in Oslo one week before the show and completed five rehearsals of her song "Satellite". Before the final, she was considered one of the favourites. Bookmakers regarded her as the second favourite behind Azerbaijan's Safura, while Google projected she would win based on search volume in the participating countries. According to Norway's Aftenposten she received the most media attention of all the participants. The final was held on 29 May 2010 at Oslo's Telenor Arena. Appearing fourth from last, Meyer-Landrut wore a simple black dress and performed on a bare stage with four backing singers. Her pared-back presentation was a break from recent Eurovision trends, as it did not feature any choreography, dancers or an elaborate stage show. "Satellite" received a total of 246 points, giving Germany its first win since 1982, and the first victory as a unified country. The song won over Turkey's entry "We Could Be the Same" with a margin of 76 points, the second largest in Eurovision history, second only to Alexander Rybak's margin of 169 points in the 2009 contest. (It would later be eclipsed by Loreen's victory in 2012, sporting a margin of 113 points). "Satellite" was awarded the maximum of 12 points nine times and received points from all but five countries. The BBC called "Satellite" the first "contemporary pop hit Eurovision has produced in decades," ushering in "a new era for the annual music jamboree". Meyer-Landrut's victory received much attention in Germany and the show was seen by 15 million viewers on German television (a 49.1 percent market share). She returned to Hanover the following day, where she was greeted by 40,000 people. In June, "Satellite" regained the top spot on the German singles chart for one week and also peaked at number one in Denmark, Finland, Norway, Sweden and Switzerland. It also topped the European Hot 100 singles chart—the first Eurovision song to do so.

In June 2010, in the German dubbed version of the animated film Sammy's Adventures: The Secret Passage, Meyer-Landrut provided the voice for the character originally spoken by Isabelle Fuhrman. In January 2011, the TV-Show Unser Song für Deutschland was held and Meyer-Landrut's 2011 Eurovision song was determined via televoting. The twelve songs Meyer-Landrut performed during that show were recorded on her second studio album Good News, which was released on 8 February 2011. The album reached Gold status in Germany within one week after its release. On 18 February 2011, the Unser Song für Deutschland final was held. It was decided through televoting that Meyer-Landrut would perform the entry "Taken by a Stranger" in the final of the Eurovision Song Contest 2011. In April 2011, she went on her first German tour of the largest concert halls in Berlin, Hanover, Frankfurt, Dortmund, Leipzig, Hamburg, Munich, Stuttgart and Cologne, though the concerts were not sold out. In May 2011, Meyer-Landrut attempted to defend her title, performing for a second consecutive time in the Eurovision Song Contest 2011 at Düsseldorf. She was the third winner to do so, and the first in over 50 years. She sang the song "Taken by a Stranger", placing 10th. She also appeared in the opening performance of the show, less than an hour before she took the stage to represent Germany.

=== 2012–2013: Stardust and The Voice ===
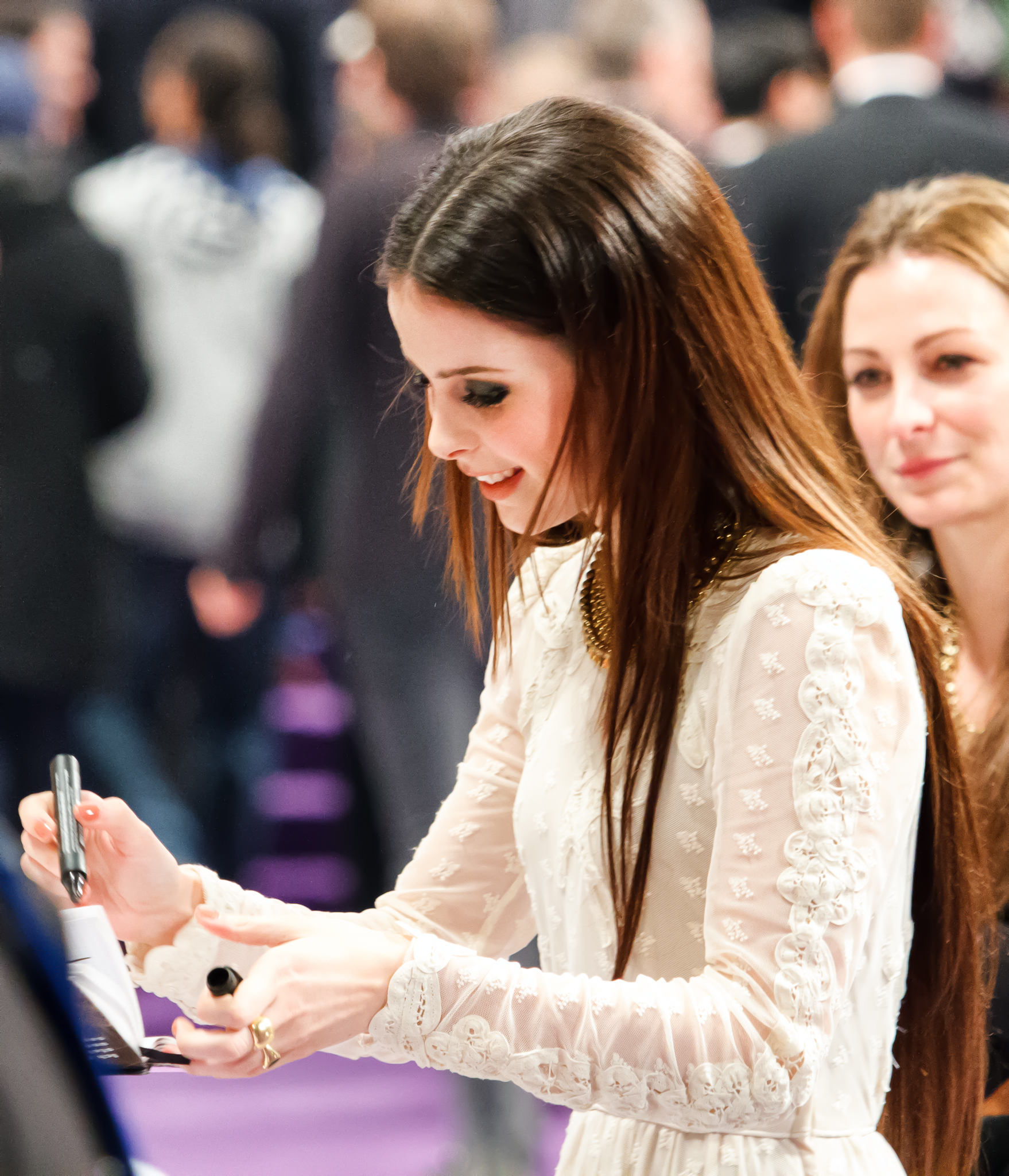
Meyer-Landrut at the Echo Music Prize 2013

On 24 May 2012, Meyer-Landrut performed as part of the interval act during the second semi-finals of the Eurovision Song Contest 2012 in Baku, Azerbaijan. She was joined by the five Eurovision winners from 2007 to 2011, which included Marija Šerifović, Dima Bilan, Alexander Rybak, and Ell & Nikki. Meyer-Landrut, Marija, Dima and Alexander performed their winning song entries accompanied by traditional Azeri instruments, and were joined by Ell & Nikki for a rendition of "Waterloo". In late July and early August she went on a promotion tour called Lenas Wohnzimmer, which took her to Munich, Cologne, Hamburg and Berlin. She performed several of her new songs. Since October 2012 she has performed the theme song in the opening credits of Sesamstraße, the German version of Sesame Street accompanied by Elmo on trumpet. Also that year, Meyer-Landrut covered the Pippi Longstocking song "Sjörövar Fabbe" ("Seeräuber-Opa Fabian") for the compilation album Giraffenaffen in November 2012.

On 21 September, "Stardust", the first single from her new album of the same name, was released. A commercial success, it was certified Gold for selling 150,000 copies. The album was released on 12 October and debuted at number two on the German Albums Chart. It produced two further singles, including "Neon (Lonely People)" and "Mr. Arrow Key". Meyer-Landrut attended the 2013 Echo Awards on 21 March. She was nominated for two categories—Best National Video for "Stardust", and as Best National Female Artist. She won the Best National Video award, but lost the Best Female National Artist award to singer Ivy Quainoo. Meyer-Landrut went on a club tour through thirteen German cities starting in Stuttgart on 2 April 2013 and finishing in Offenbach am Main on 21 April. The final concert was streamed live via the Internet. The No One Can Catch Us Tour name was taken from a line on her first single from the album, Stardust. In April and May 2013 she was one of three judges on the show The Voice Kids alongside Tim Bendzko and Henning Wehland.

Meyer-Landrut was president of the German jury, also including Carolin Niemczyk, Alina Süggeler, Tim Bendzko and Florian Silbereisen, and the spokesperson for Germany, revealing the countries voting results at the Eurovision Song Contest 2013 final on 18 May. In July 2013, it was announced that she would be the German voice of Jane in the motion capture animated film Tarzan 3D, which was released in German cinemas in February 2014. In the same month she dubbed the voice of three characters in the two audiobooks Giraffenaffen – Wir sind da! and Giraffenaffen – Die Schatzssuche, which were both published in October 2013. Meyer-Landrut re-united with her Eurovision mentor Stefan Raab in October 2013 when she was featured on "Revolution", a single released by Raab's band Dicks on Fire. In June 2013, this song was used for a video promoting the Doosh shower head Doosh, invented by Stefan Raab. In it Lena poses as Lara Croft in the shower. In 2013, she became a L'Oréal hair coloring and skin care products brand ambassador.

=== 2014–2015: Crystal Sky ===
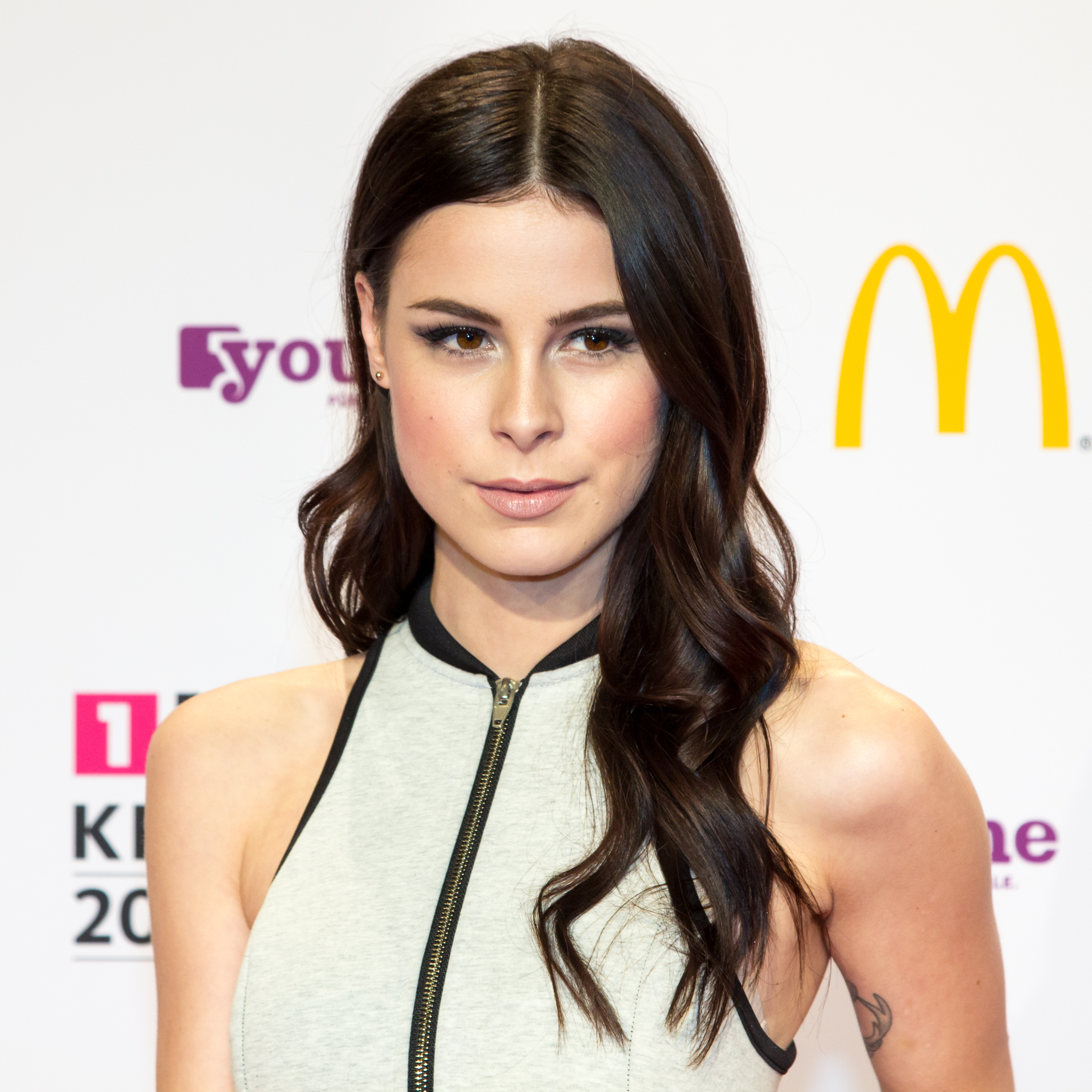
Meyer-Landrut at the 1LIVE Krone 2015

From March to May 2014, Meyer-Landrut returned as coach for the second season of The Voice Kids along with Henning Wehland from Söhne Mannheims and Johannes Strate from Revolverheld. Around the same time, she began principal work on her fourth studio album Crystal Sky. Taking her sound further into the electro and dance pop genre, she worked with the English production and songwriting team Biffco, and the Berlin-based collective Beatgees on most of the album. In November 2014, one of their collaborations, the children's song "Schlaft alle", appeared on the compilation album Giraffenaffen 3. The same month, Meyer-Landrut's rendition of the Aladdin song "A Whole New World" was included on the compilation album I Love Disney.

From February to April 2015, Meyer-Landrut reprised her role as a coach on the third season of The Voice Kids along with singers Strate and Mark Forster. After four press concerts in Hamburg, Berlin, Munich, and Cologne from late February to early March 2015 she released Crystal Sky's first single "Traffic Lights" to radio in March 2015. It reached the top twenty of the German Singles Chart. Crystal Sky was released in May 2015. It marked her fourth consecutive album to reach the top two of the German Albums Chart. But it was less successful in Austria and Switzerland, where it failed to reach the top twenty on both music markets' charts. In September 2015, Meyer-Landrut released "Wild & Free", the theme song for the motion picture Fack ju Göhte 2 as a single. The song peaked at number eight on the German Singles Chart, becoming her highest-charting single in three years.

=== 2016–2022: Sing meinen Song and Only Love, L ===
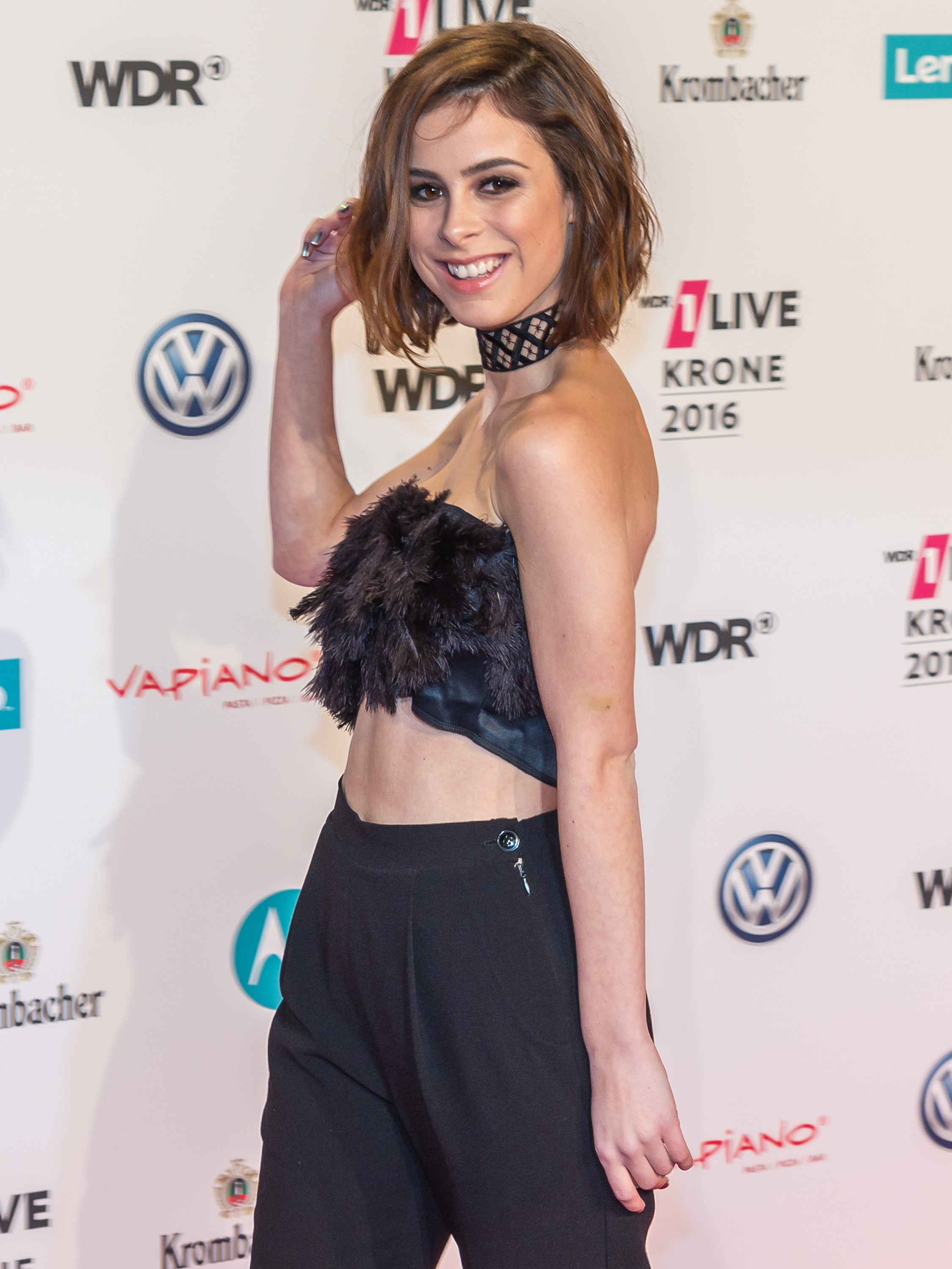
Meyer-Landrut at the 1LIVE Krone 2016

After taking a little break, in December 2016, Meyer-Landrut revealed on her Twitter account that her forthcoming fifth studio album would be called Gemini and that she had already begun working on it. In April 2017, she released the single "Lost in You", which reached number 58 in Germany. The following month, Meyer-Landrut participated in the fourth season of the German TV show Sing meinen Song - Das Tauschkonzert, the German version of the series The Best Singers. In its third episode, she premiered the previously unreleased song "If I Wasn't Your Daughter". German press instantly discussed the song's content, which refers to Lena's relationship with her father who left the family when she was two. The song reached the top forty in Germany and Switzerland where it became her highest-charting single since 2015's "Wild & Free". A Sing meinen Song compilation album, released in May 2016, topped the Austrian and German Albums Chart. In August 2017, Lena collaborated with the German hip hop group Genetikk on the song "Lang lebe die Gang". In November 2017, Meyer-Landrut stated via YouTube that she had scrapped the entire Gemini album because she was not happy with it.

In June 2018, Meyer-Landrut collaborated with DJ Topic and Spanish DJ Juan Magán on the single "Sólo Contigo". In October, it was revealed, that she would return as a coach on the seventh season of The Voice Kids. In November 2018, Lena released "Thank You" as the lead single from her fifth studio album Only Love, L. The song debuted and peaked at number 40 in Germany. On 15 March 2019, "Don't Lie to Me" was released as the album's second single. The song debuted and peaked at number 63 in Germany. The song "Sex in the Morning" featuring Ramz was released on 29 March 2019. Released on 5 April 2019, Only Love, L peaked at number 2 in Germany.

The More Love Edition of Only Love, L was released on 6 December 2019. It featured the songs "Better" and "It Takes Two", as well as acoustic versions of "Thank You", "Don't Lie to Me", "Skinny Bitch" and "Better".

=== 2023–present: Loyal to Myself ===
On 16 June 2023, Meyer-Landrut released a new single titled "What I Want" from her upcoming sixth studio album. The album Loyal to Myself was released on 31 May 2024. "Straitjacket" and the title track were also released as singles prior to the album's release.

== Media image ==
Meyer-Landrut has been noted for her unconventional way of handling the press, which has been labelled "aloof" as well as "quick-witted" and "intuitive". She usually refuses to answer questions about her private life, including her family, friends and personal beliefs, sometimes calling questions "stupid" or responding with counterquestions instead. This has drawn praise as well as criticism, including allegations of being arrogant and disrespectful.

Meyer-Landrut's demeanour has been described as "carefree", and "laid-back and self-effacing". She has been said to possess an "adequate youthful megalomania," to "cultivate her forwardness" and to stand for "unadorned genuineness" and "sincerity". She has also been described as giving "infatuation a rhythm" and blurring the "fine line between puppy love and psychotic obsession" in her song "Satellite". Her vocals have been both praised and criticised. In an attempt to explain Meyer-Landrut's success, her appearance has been called a "mix of loveliness, professionalism and a little craziness". She has also been lauded for her stage presence and charisma.

== Discography ==
Studio albums

- My Cassette Player (2010)
- Good News (2011)
- Stardust (2012)
- Crystal Sky (2015)
- Only Love, L (2019)
- Loyal to Myself (2024)

== Film and television ==
Year	Film	Role	Note
2010	A Turtle's Tale: Sammy's Adventures	Shelly	German voice-dub
2014	Tarzan 3D	Jane	German voice-dub
2016	Trolls	Poppy	German voice-dub
2019	Wonder Park	June	German voice-dub
2020	Trolls: World Tour	Poppy	German voice-dub
2023	Trolls Band Together	Poppy	German voice-dub
Year	TV show	Role	Note
2011	Bundesvision Song Contest 2011	Herself – Co-presenter	
2012	Durch die Nacht mit … Casper	Herself	arte documentary
2013–2016; 2019–2020; 2022–2024	The Voice Kids	Herself – Judge/Coach	
2017	Sing meinen Song - Das Tauschkonzert	Herself - Participant	
2024	Wer stiehlt mir die Show	Herself - Participant	

== Awards and nominations ==
Year	Award	Category	Work	Result
2010	Eurovision Song Contest 2010		"Satellite"	1st place
2010	Comet	Best Newcomer	Herself	Nominated
2010	Goldene Henne Award	Reader's award of the SuperIllu magazine: Rock/Pop/Schlager	Herself	Nominated
2010	Goldene Henne Honor Award	Ambassador of Charm	Herself	Won
2010	SWR3 New Pop Festival	Newcomer of the Year	Herself	Won
2010	1LIVE Krone	Best Artist	Herself	Won
2010	1LIVE Krone	Best Single	"Satellite"	Won
2010	Bravo Otto	Best Singer	Herself	Nominated
2011	Goldene Kamera	Best Music National	Herself	Won
2011	Echo	Best National Newcomer	Herself	Won
2011	Echo	Best Female National Artist	Herself	Won
2011	Echo	Radio Echo for "Satellite"	"Satellite"	Nominated
2011	Echo	Single of the Year	"Satellite"	Nominated
2011	Echo	Album of the Year	My Cassette Player	Nominated
2011	Comet	Best Female Artist	Herself	Won
2011	Comet	Best Song	"Satellite"	Nominated
2011	MTV Europe Music Awards	Best German Act	Herself	Won
2011	MTV Europe Music Awards	Best European Act	Herself	Won
2011	MTV Europe Music Awards	Best Worldwide Act	Herself	Nominated
2011	1LIVE Krone	Best Single	"Taken By a Stranger"	Nominated
2011	Eurovision Song Contest 2011		"Taken By a Stranger"	10th Place
2012	MTV Germany Jahresvoting 2011	Queen of Pop	Herself	Won
2012	Echo	Best Video	"Taken by a Stranger"	Nominated
2012	Echo	Best Female National Artist	Herself	Nominated
2012	1LIVE Krone	Best Single	"Stardust"	Nominated
2012	Bravo Otto	Best Singer	Herself	Nominated
2013	Echo	Best Female National Artist	Herself	Nominated
2013	Echo	Best Video	"Stardust"	Won
2013	Nickelodeon Kids' Choice Awards	Favorite Singer Germany, Austria, Switzerland	Herself	Nominated
2013	Radio Regenbogen Award	Listeners Award	Herself	Nominated
2013	Goldene Henne Award	Reader's Award of the SuperIllu magazine – Music	Herself	Nominated
2013	MTV Europe Music Awards	Best German Act	Herself	Won
2013	MTV Europe Music Awards	Best Central Europe Act	Herself	Won
2013	MTV Europe Music Awards	Best World Wide Act	Herself	Nominated
2015	MTV Europe Music Awards	Best German Act	Herself	Won
2015	1LIVE Krone	Best Female Artist	Herself	Won
2015	Bravo Otto	Best Singer	Herself	Won
2016	Nickelodeon Kids Choice Awards	Favourite Star (Germany, Austria, Switzerland)	Herself	Won
2016	Radio Regenbogen Award	National Female Artist	Herself	Won
2016	Echo	Rock/Pop Female National Artist	Crystal Sky	Nominated

== See also ==
- Nicole Seibert, the only other German to have won the Eurovision Song Contest

Awards and achievements
Preceded by (Norway) Alexander Rybak with "Fairytale"	Winner of the Eurovision Song Contest; 2010	Succeeded by (Azerbaijan) Ell and Nikki with "Running Scared"
Preceded by Alex Swings Oscar Sings with "Miss Kiss Kiss Bang"	Germany in the Eurovision Song Contest; 2010, 2011	Succeeded by Roman Lob with "Standing Still"
Preceded by (Italy) Marco Mengoni	Best European Act in the MTV Europe Music Awards; 2011	Succeeded by (Russia) Dima Bilan
