= Whitewash (disambiguation) =

Whitewash is a paint-like covering of hydrated lime or a cheap white paint.

Whitewash or whitewashing may also refer to:

== Literature and the arts ==
- Whitewash (1994 film), an American television animated short film
- White Wash (film), a 2011 American documentary film
- Whitewash (2013 film), a Canadian drama film
- Whitewash (book), a 2017 nonfiction book by Carey Gillam
- Germany and Israel: Whitewashing and Statebuilding, a 2020 nonfiction book by Daniel Marwecki
- Whitewash Jones, a racist caricature from the 1940s comic book Young Allies
- Whitewash, a 1966 book by Harold Weisberg
- Whitewash II: The FBI-Secret Service Cover Up, a 1967 book by Harold Weisberg
- Whitewash IV: Top Secret JFK Assassination Transcript, a 1974 book by Harold Weisberg

== Racial identity ==
- Whitewashing (beauty), modifying the skin tones of photographs of nonwhite people in mass media
- Whitewashing in art, the practice of altering the racial identity of historical and mythological figures
- Whitewashing in film, the practice of casting white actors in non-white roles

== Other uses ==
- Whitewashing (communications), propaganda to cover up bad behavior
- Whitewash (sport), a sports series in which one side wins every contest
- Whitewash procedure, in shareholder law, a legal procedure regarding financial assistance

== See also ==
- Blanqueamiento, branqueamento, or "whitening", a social practice in many post-colonial countries to "improve the race" towards a supposed ideal of whiteness
- Racial whitening, branqueamento in Brazil between 1889 and 1914
- Shutout, a sports contest in which one side prevents the other from scoring any points
- The most basic type of thickening agent used in cooking, flour blended with water to make a paste
