= Congressional Research Service =

U.S. Congress-affiliated think tank

Agency overview
- Formed: July 16, 1914; 112 years ago
- Headquarters: 101 Independence Ave. SE Washington, D.C., U.S.
- Annual budget: $133.6 million (2023)
- Agency executives: Karen Donfried, Director; T.J. Halstead, Deputy Director
- Website: loc.gov/crsinfo

The Congressional Research Service (CRS) is a nonpartisan public policy research institute under the Library of Congress of the United States Congress. CRS works primarily and directly for members of Congress and their committees and staff on a confidential, nonpartisan basis. CRS is sometimes known as Congress's think tank due to its broad mandate of providing research and analysis on all matters relevant to national policymaking.

CRS has roughly 600 employees, who have a wide variety of expertise and disciplines, including lawyers, economists, historians, political scientists, reference librarians, and scientists. In the 2023 fiscal year, it was appropriated a budget of roughly $133.6 million by Congress.

Modeled after the Wisconsin Legislative Reference Bureau, CRS was founded on July 16, 1914, during the height of the Progressive Era as part of a broader effort to professionalize the government by providing independent research and information to public officials. Its work was initially made available to the public, but between 1952 and 2018 was restricted only to members of Congress and their staff; non-confidential reports have since been accessible on its website. In 2019, CRS announced it was adding "the back catalog of older CRS reports" and also introducing new publicly available reports, such as its "two-page executive level briefing documents".

CRS is one of three major legislative agencies that support Congress, along with the Congressional Budget Office (which provides Congress with budget-related information, reports on fiscal, budgetary, and programmatic issues, and analyses of budget policy options, costs, and effects) and the Government Accountability Office (which assists Congress in reviewing and monitoring the activities of government by conducting independent audits, investigations, and evaluations of federal programs). Collectively, the three agencies employ more than 4,000 people.

== History ==
In 1914, Senator Robert La Follette Sr. and Representative John M. Nelson, both of Wisconsin, promoted the inclusion in the legislative, executive, and judicial appropriations act of a provision directing the establishment of a special reference unit within the Library of Congress. Building upon a concept developed by the New York State Library in 1890 and the Wisconsin Legislative Reference Library in 1901, they were motivated by Progressive Era ideas about the importance of the acquisition of knowledge for an informed and independent legislature. The move also reflected the expanding role of the librarian and the professionalization of the profession. The new department was charged with responding to congressional requests for information. The legislation authorized the librarian of Congress, Herbert Putnam, to "employ competent persons to prepare such indexes, digests, and compilations of laws as may be required for Congress and other official use..."

Renamed the Legislative Reference Service and given a permanent authorization with the Legislative Reorganization Act of 1946, it assisted Congress primarily by providing facts and publications and by transmitting research and analysis done largely by other government agencies, private organizations, and individual scholars. Verner W. Clapp headed the unit.

The Library of Congress, the home of CRS, had experimented during the 1940s with unrestricted publication Public Affairs Bulletins, which were produced by staff of the Legislative Reference Service, and devoted to various public policy issues. They were promoted by Archibald MacLeish, the librarian of Congress, and, among other topics, addressed timely policy issues, such as American national defense. About 100 Public Affairs Bulletins were generated before congressional appropriators ended their production in 1951.

The renaming under the Legislative Reorganization Act of 1970 reflected the service's changing mission: This legislation directed CRS to devote more of its efforts and increased resources to doing research and analysis that assists Congress in direct support of the legislative process.

The Congressional Research Service Review launched in 1980 and continued until the early 1990s; then congressional appropriators, once again, invoked "fiscal closure." The Review was published ten times a year and was available to the public by subscription. It offered analytical articles, summaries of CRS research products, and other assistance to the congressional community.

Inquiries increased from 400,000 questions per year in 1980 to 598,000 in 2000. CRS was reorganized in 1999 partly to handle the load, relocating staff, adopting more efficient workstations, and attempting to enable more communication across disciplinary specialists.

CRS reports were not generally available to the public until September 18, 2018, when a provision of the Consolidated Appropriations Act of 2018, which directed that CRS reports be available to the public, was implemented.

== Mission ==
CRS offers Congress research and analysis on all current and emerging issues of national policy. CRS offers timely and confidential assistance to all members and committees that request it, but this is limited only by CRS's resources and the requirements for balance, nonpartisanship, and accuracy.

CRS makes no legislative or other policy recommendations to Congress; its responsibility is to ensure that Members of the House and Senate have available the best possible information and analysis on which to base the policy decisions the American people have elected them to make. In all its work, CRS analysts are governed by requirements for confidentiality, timeliness, accuracy, objectivity, balance, and nonpartisanship.

CRS services are not limited to those that relate directly to enacting new laws. For example, CRS attempts to assess emerging issues and developing problems so that it will be prepared to assist Congress if and when it becomes necessary. Although it rarely conducts field research, CRS assists committees in other aspects of their study and oversight responsibilities. In addition, it offers numerous courses, including legal research seminars and institutes on the legislative process, the budget processes, and the work of district and state staff. At the beginning of each Congress, CRS also provides an orientation seminar for new Members.

CRS does not conduct research on sitting Members or living former Members of Congress, unless granted specific permission by that Member or if the President nominates that Member for another office.

== Organization ==
CRS is divided into six interdisciplinary research divisions, each of which is further divided into subject specialist sections. The six divisions are: American Law; Domestic Social Policy; Foreign Affairs, Defense and Trade; Government and Finance; Knowledge Services; and Resources, Science and Industry.

The six research divisions are supported in their work by five "infrastructure" offices: Finance and Administration, Information Management and Technology, Counselor to the Director, Congressional Information and Publishing, and Workforce Management and Development.

== Overview of services ==
Responses to congressional requests take the form of reports, memoranda, customized briefings, seminars, videotaped presentations, information obtained from automated databases, and consultations in person and by telephone.

CRS "supports the Members, committees, and leaders of the House and Senate at all stages of the legislative process":

- Ideas for legislation. A 2008 CRS report details how the service can assist legislators in evaluating the need for legislation:

At the preliminary stage, members may ask CRS to provide background information and analysis on issues and events to better understand the existing situation and then assess whether a problem requires a legislative remedy. This assistance may be a summary and explanation of the scientific evidence on a technically complex matter, for example, or it may be a collection of newspaper and journal articles discussing an issue from different perspectives, or a comparative analysis of several explanations that have been offered to account for a generally recognized problem. CRS also identifies national and international experts with whom Members and staff may consult about whatever issues concern them and sponsors programs at which Members meet with experts to discuss issues of broad interest to Congress.

- Analyzing a bill. The same 2008 report also clarifies the various ways in which the service further supports the work of legislators once a bill has been introduced:

If a Member decides to introduce a bill, CRS analysts can assist the legislator in clarifying the purposes of the bill, identifying issues it may address, defining alternative ways for dealing with them, evaluating the possible advantages and disadvantages of each alternative, developing information and arguments to support the bill, and anticipating possible criticisms of the bill and responses to them. Although CRS does not draft bills, resolutions, and amendments, its analysts may join staff consulting with the professional draftsman within each chamber's Office of the Legislative Counsel as they translate the Member's policy decisions into formal legislative language. Members and committees can also request CRS to help them assess and compare legislative proposals, including competing bills introduced by Members and proposals presented by executive branch officials, private citizens, and organizations. CRS can assess the various proposals' intent, scope, and limits.

The report goes on:

During committee and floor consideration, CRS can assist Representatives and Senators in several different ways, in addition to providing background information to assist Members in understanding the issues a bill addresses. CRS attorneys can help clarify the legal effects the bill may have. CRS policy analysts can work with members to decide whether to propose amendments and then make certain that their amendments are designed and phrased to achieve the desired results. CRS also can help Members prepare for the debate by providing data and other information that they can use to support the positions they have decided to take.

- Hearings. When a subcommittee selects a bill (or several bills on the same subject) for serious attention, it usually begins by conducting public hearings on one or more days at which executive branch officials, other Members of Congress, representatives of private organizations, and even individual citizens present their views on the bill's merits. CRS analysts can assist in this process by providing background information and reports, presenting a preliminary briefing to Members or staff, identifying potential witnesses, and suggesting questions that Members may consider asking the witnesses.
- Subcommittee or committee votes. After the hearings on a bill, the subcommittee or committee meets to debate and vote on amendments to it. If requested, CRS staff may attend these meetings to serve as a nonpartisan source of expert information available to all Members. If the subcommittee and then the full committee conclude that new legislation is needed, they report a bill to the House or Senate for all its Members to consider. The committee also submits a written report explaining its decision's background, analyzing the purposes and effects of each major provision of the bill, and includes other information, such as predictions about the cost of implementing it, that helps other Members decide whether they should support the bill. CRS specialists may assist the committee's staff in preparing some sections of this report, although the Congressional Budget Office develops cost estimates.
- Parliamentary procedure. CRS staff can clarify the legislative procedures of the House and Senate, assisting Members and staff in understanding the effects of these procedures and how Members can use the procedures to promote their own legislative goals.
- Conference committees. CRS analysts can contribute to this last stage of the legislative process by helping identify the issues to be resolved, by clarifying and comparing the positions of the two houses on each issue, and by identifying different ways in which the legislative disagreements could be resolved.

CRS also performs several functions that support Congressional and public understanding of the legislative process and other issues.

- Bill Summaries. Since 1935, the Legislative Analysis and Information Section (formerly "Bill Digest") of CRS has had statutory responsibility for the preparation of authoritative, objective, nonpartisan summaries of introduced public bills and resolutions and maintenance of historical legislative information. Detailed revised summaries are written to reflect changes made in the course of the legislative process. This CRS office also prepares titles, bill relationships, subject terms, and Congressional Record citations for debates, full texts of measures, and Member introductory remarks. The bill summaries were released to the public via THOMAS, the Library of Congress's online database, but are now released via Congress.gov.
- Constitution Annotated. The American Law Division of the Congressional Research Service prepares The Constitution of the United States of America: Analysis and Interpretation (popularly known as the Constitution Annotated), a continually updated legal treatise that explains the U.S. Constitution as it has been interpreted by the U.S. Supreme Court.

== Congressional Research Service reports ==
Reports by the Congressional Research Service, usually referred to as CRS Reports, are the encyclopedic research reports written to define issues in a legislative context clearly.

Over 700 new CRS reports are produced each year; 566 new products were prepared in Fiscal Year 2011. Nearly 7,800 were in existence as of the end of 2011.

The types of CRS reports include Issue Briefs (IB), Research Memos (RM), and Reports, which appear in both Short (RS) and Long (RL) formats.

Air War College of the United States Air Force published a categorical listing of CRS reports, last updated on May 13, 2011.

== Access to CRS reports ==
As of September 18, 2018, most CRS reports are available to the public through the official US Congress website crsreports.congress.gov. Older CRS report versions may be accessed from community-supported sources. Since as of September 18, 2018, the official US government website "makes non-confidential reports available on its website" alternative access sites are less needed.

Previously they were confidential. While not classified, they were exempt from Freedom of Information Act requests due to congressional privilege and, therefore, not readily accessible, nor was their authenticity easily verifiable. Prior to September 2018, CRS products were only made directly available to members of Congress, congressional committees, and CRS's sister agencies (CBO and GAO) through the internal CRS Web system.

== Predecessors ==
Other than a passing generic reference to "reports" in its statutory charter, CRS has no mandate for these products. They are created in the context of the overall mission of CRS to provide research support to Congress.

The Library of Congress, the home of CRS, had experimented during the 1940s with unrestricted publication Public Affairs Bulletins, which were produced by staff of the Legislative Reference Service, and devoted to various public policy issues. They were promoted by Archibald MacLeish, the librarian of Congress, and, among other topics, addressed timely policy issues, such as American national defense. About 100 Public Affairs Bulletins were generated before congressional appropriators ended their production in 1951.

When the Congressional Research Service Review was launched in 1980, it continued for a little more than a decade before congressional appropriators, once again, invoked fiscal closure with the last issue published v. 13 #9 (Sept. 1992). The Review, which was published ten times a year and available to the public by subscription, offered original analytical articles, summaries highlighting CRS research products, and other kinds of assistance to the congressional community.

== Copyright status ==
The New York Times has written that the reports contain neither classified information nor copyrighted information.

However, in a passage analyzing its own liability under United States copyright law, the CRS has written that:

CRS may incorporate preexisting material in its written responses to congressional requests. Although such material is often from public domain sources, in certain instances the material, appropriately credited, may be from copyrighted sources. To the extent that the material is copyrighted, CRS either:

- obtains permission for the use;
- considers its information-gathering function protected by the speech or debate clause;
- or believes that the use falls under the "fair use" doctrine of the Copyright Act as applied in the context of the legislative process.

However, the copyright permission obtained is usually understood to be for the purpose of legislative use by members of Congress.

Thus, persons seeking public domain content in CRS reports can avoid infringing copyright by paying attention to the internal citations.

== Appearance ==
CRS written work products fall into three major categories: (1) Congressionally Distributed Products Providing Research and Analysis on Legislative Issues, (2) Responses to Individual Members and Committees, and (3) Legislative Summaries, Digests, and Compilations.

Congressionally Distributed Products Providing Research and Analysis on Legislative Issues itself is broken into two subcategories: Reports for Congress and Congressional Distribution Memoranda.

Reports for Congress: CRS often prepares reports for Congress, analyses, or studies on specific policy issues of legislative interest. These reports clearly define issues in legislative contexts. Analysts define and explain technical terms and concepts, frame the issues in understandable and timely contexts, and provide appropriate, accurate, and valid quantitative data. The content of the report is summarized on its first page. These reports may be updated as events occur, or archived when they no longer reflect the current legislative agenda but can provide background and historical context.

Congressional Distribution Memoranda: Similar to the reports, memoranda are prepared when the interest of a relatively small number of congressional readers is anticipated or when an issue is sufficiently transient that CRS deems it inappropriate to include it in its list of products. Memoranda can be recast as a report if it becomes important to a larger congressional audience.

Responses to Individual Members and Committees: CRS staff provide custom services for Members and committees and their staff, tailored to address specific questions, and usually in a memorandum format. Written documents include Confidential Memoranda, Email Responses, and Briefing Books.

Confidential Memoranda: Confidential memoranda are prepared to meet a specific congressional request and are often designed for a congressional reader with a high level of expertise in a given topic. These memoranda are prepared for the use of the requester and are not distributed by CRS to a larger audience unless the requester gives permission.

Email Responses: Email responses to request for information can range from providing a statistic or a name to a short briefing to an interactive discussion on a variety of issues.

Briefing Books: Prepared for use by congressional delegations traveling abroad, these books are collections of material that support the specific purposes of a congressional trip. Briefing books can include a variety of materials, such as maps, selected products, and brief tailored written work, all of which contain background and current issues regarding U.S. relations with specific countries on the trip as well as questions Members may ask when meeting with government or other officials.

Legislative Summaries, Digests, and Compilations: Since 1935, the Legislative Analysis and Information Section (formerly the "Bill Digest" section) of CRS has had the statutory responsibility for preparation of authoritative, objective, nonpartisan summaries of introduced public bills and resolutions and the maintenance of historical legislative information. Detailed revised summaries are written to reflect changes made in the course of the legislative process. This CRS office also prepares titles, bill relationships, subject terms, and Congressional Record citations for debates, full text of measures, and Member introductory remarks.

== Confidentiality of CRS Reports ==
The confidentiality status of Congressional Research Service reports, until September 18, 2018, was a matter of contention due to the lack of public access to research that was paid for by taxpayer money.

Congress had historically reserved to itself control over the dissemination of CRS products to the public on the principle that CRS, as an extension of congressional staff, works exclusively for the Congress: "dissemination is limited to Members of Congress." From 1952 until 2018, a provision was included in CRS annual appropriations acts requiring approval by one of its two congressional oversight committees for acts of "publication" by the CRS.

The limitation began in the House as a flat prohibition on publications by the Library of Congress using funds appropriated to the Legislative Reference Service (now CRS). In 1954, a provision was added providing for exception only with the approval of our oversight committees.

=== Unlocking CRS report access ===
- 1978: The National Conference of State Legislatures (NCSL) issued a proposal under which CRS would have received access to the files of State research materials abstracted by the NCSL, and would have had the opportunity to order copies of desired items for use in answering congressional inquiries. In return, CRS would have provided the NCSL with periodic listings of CRS Reports (called "multiliths" at that time) and with only one copy of those CRS Reports which the NCSL requested. Under this proposal, the NCSL also would have gained access to certain files from the Library of Congress's SCORPIO system, including CRS Issue Briefs. A congressional committee expressed the view that it was appropriate for Members of Congress, rather than CRS, to determine whether and to what extent various CRS products should be publicly disseminated. As a result, no action was taken to implement the proposed CRS-NCSL exchange.
- 1980: The Joint Committee on the Library released a policy statement regarding the publication of CRS written products: that said "the long-standing policy of confidentiality in the work of CRS for individual congressional clients should be maintained" and gave cost as part of its reason. A subsequent statement referred to "the legislative process and ... the Speech or Debate Clause of the Constitution."
- 1990: Facing a challenge, the Senate Majority Leader reiterated the importance of "protecting the work done by CRS in preparing communications to the Members and committees of Congress": and elaborated by noting "A committee or Member of the Senate, of course, may determine to make available to the public a report or memorandum which the Congressional Research Service has provided to the committee or Senator... Nevertheless, ... it is important to protect the confidentiality of CRS's preparatory work in order to encourage the freest possible exploration by CRS..."
- 1998, 1999, 2001, 2003: Attempts were made by members of congress to pass legislation requiring the CRS to make its products available on a public website. All failed to pass.

Some members of congress used committee websites to disseminate individual reports, beginning in 1998. Senator Tom Daschle (D-SD) was the first to act, putting almost 300 CRS products on his website. They were subsequently removed.

Representatives Shays and Mark Green (R-WI) have placed many CRS products on their own websites in an attempt to make some CRS products available to the public.

"Reports are produced by the Congressional Research Service staff for the education of members of Congress", Kyle Anderson, a spokesman for the House Administration Committee, which has jurisdiction over the issue in the House, wrote in an e-mail message to The New York Times. "Just as other memos produced by staffers for members of Congress aren't made public, these are not."

This was countered by a clarification saying that the goal was the public release of only reports the research service produces, not the memorandums it also writes for members of Congress. (Former) Senator Joseph I. Lieberman said in an e-mail message to The New York Times. "These reports inform members of Congress and their staffs on a wide range of issues. The American people, who pay for these reports, should be able to learn from this same expert analysis."

=== 1997 CRS memorandum ===
In a December 1997 memorandum, the CRS summarized the "Legal Issues Presented by Proposals for the General Release of CRS Products to the Public":

- Speech and debate immunity: Reducing "substantial role in the legislative process". Such proposals might "cause the judiciary and administrative agencies to reassess their perception of CRS as playing a substantial role in the legislative process, and thereby might endanger a claim of [Speech and Debate Clause] immunity even in an instance in which CRS was fulfilling its legislative mission (e.g., by preparing a confidential memorandum for a Member on a pending bill.)"
- Libel, slander, and defamation. CRS also believes that slander or libel actions might occur more frequently if CRS products were put on the Internet, because more people would read CRS products and know of their existence.
- Confidentiality of CRS files. CRS believes that broader dissemination of CRS products would likely inspire more litigants who wish to obtain, for purposes of discovery, the files of CRS analysts. This might, CRS argues, cause the public release of correspondence between Members of Congress and CRS.
- Copyright infringement. CRS argues that it might be subject to claims of copyright infringement if CRS products were available on the Internet. CRS sometimes incorporates copyrighted work into its reports and products. (Elsewhere, the CRS notes that these inclusions are always "appropriately credited".)

=== Responses to the 1997 CRS memorandum ===
==== Memorandum of Gary Ruskin ====
On January 5, 1998, Gary Ruskin, Director of the Congressional Accountability Project, wrote a memorandum that disputed each of the arguments in the 1997 CRS memorandum.

==== Letter of Stanley M. Brand ====
On January 27, 1998, Stanley M. Brand, the former general counsel to the House of Representatives, wrote a letter to Senator John McCain:

Concerning applicability of the Speech or Debate Clause, U.S. Const. art. I, 6, cl. 1, to certain CRS products which your bill would, if enacted, make available on the Internet, I believe that the concerns expressed in the CRS memorandum are either overstated, or the extent they are not, provide no basis for arguing that protection of CRS works will be weakened by your bill.

(See also his letter addressing a 2001 reintroduction of the same legislation.)

John McCain cited this letter on the Senate floor when he was proposing an amendment to the Legislative Branch Appropriations Act 1999 that would direct the Director of the Congressional Research Service to post "CRS Reports to Congress" and "CRS Issue Briefs" on the Internet. In this speech, he also noted:

I would like to point out that the Rules Committee has approved a decentralized system, where Senators can release CRS products on their private web pages. I see no difference between the release of CRS material on one hundred independent web pages and THOMAS, a Congressionally mandated web page. Both approaches should protect CRS equally. I also urge my colleagues not to believe other arguments that CRS will suffer from a huge rise in workload from this amendment. It will require only two computer technicians to set up this web site, and keep it updated. CRS already has a process for deciding which information goes up on their web site for Members of Congress. This bill only asks that they duplicate this process for a public version of that web page. Also, we release paper copies of these products to our constituents every day without causing a great strain to CRS staff. Finally, I have the results of an analysis of state legislative research organizations that do work similar to CRS and post these products on the Internet. None of these organizations have complained of a huge increased workload from releasing their products to the Internet.

== Written work-product ==
Document types include CRS reports, appropriations reports (usually released as long Reports), and congressional distribution memoranda.

=== CRS reports ===
The most commonly requested CRS product is the general congressional distribution reports, known as "CRS reports". The purpose of a report is to clearly define the issue in the legislative context. The types of CRS reports include Issue Briefs (IB), Research Memos (RM), and Reports, which appear in both Short (RS) and Long (RL) formats.

Other than a passing generic reference to "reports" in its statutory charter, CRS has no mandate for these products. They are created in the context of the overall mission of CRS to provide research support to Congress.

The reports may take many forms, including policy analysis, economic studies, statistical reviews, and legal analyses.

CRS reports are considered in-depth, accurate, objective, and timely, and topped the list of the "10 Most-Wanted Government Documents" survey by the Center for Democracy and Technology in 1996.

== See also ==
- Federal Research Division
- California Office of Legislative Counsel of the California State Legislature
- OPPAGA of the Florida Legislature
