= Nástup =

Slovak periodical

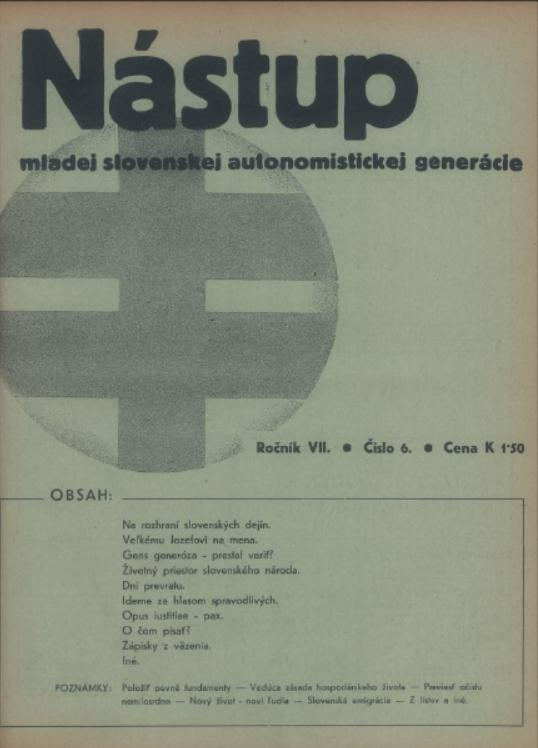
Nástup, volume 7 issue 6 (1938)

Nástup (translated as "line up" "forming ranks", "deployment", or "ascent") was a semimonthly Slovak periodical, published between 1933 and 1940, that advocated Slovak autonomy, ethnonationalism, and antisemitism. Founded by Ferdinand Ďurčanský and his brother Ján, the magazine was oriented at younger Slovak Catholics, especially university students. Its readers, the most radical wing of the Slovak People's Party, were called "Nástupists" or "Nástup faction"; many of them had been previously affiliated with the Rodobrana paramilitary and later with the Hlinka Guard paramilitary.

Noted for its hostility to the Czechoslovak state and its insistence that Jews could never be part of the Slovak nation, the paper admired some aspects of Nazism, but disagreed with those which could not be reconciled with Catholicism. Israeli historian Yetayashu Jelínek described Nástup as offering "a sui generis brand of extreme rightist ideology". Ultimately, the paper was banned and shut down in 1940 following Nazi interference in the Salzburg Conference, as Nástup favored an independent, as opposed to pro-German, foreign policy.

== History ==
Nástup was founded by Ferdinand Ďurčanský and his brother Ján in April 1933 following the decline of the Rodobrana paramilitary organization, officially dissolved in 1929. Officially, its name was Nástup mladej slovenskej autonomistickej generácie (The Ascent of the Young Slovak Autonomist Generation), but it was commonly referred to as Nástup. Historian Sabine Witt suggests that the title may derive from the 1929 poem "Nástup otrávených" (The Deployment of the Poisoned) by Andrej Žarnov, which was banned for its advocacy of Slovak autonomy. Published semimonthly, Nástup was popular among young Slovak nationalists, especially students and university graduates. Editorial staff was derived from the Slovak People's Party's main publication, Slovák (Karol Murgaš), as well as Rozvoj (Jozef M. Kirschbaum). There was a significant continuity between Rodobrana, Nástup, and the later Hlinka Guard paramilitary, founded in 1938. Vojtech Tuka and Alexander Mach, some of the movers behind the creation of Rodobrana, were also key members of the Nástup faction and supported the paper.

In 1933, Nástupists disrupted a commemoration event for Saints Cyril and Methodius, forcing the organizers to allow Andrej Hlinka, leader of the Slovak People's Party, to speak. This triggered arrests of some of the rioters and a temporary ban on the paper. It was also banned for six months in late 1934 and early 1935. From late 1934, the paper received funding from the Polish Foreign Ministry. Although Hlinka once denied that Nástup had any affiliation with the Slovak People's Party, in fact all of the periodical's writers were party members and wielded increasing influence over Hlinka and his party. The paper was banned again following the July 1940 Salzburg Conference in which the Germans targeted Nástupists, objecting to their refusal to follow an exclusively pro-German foreign policy, and permanently discontinued the same year.

== Content ==
According to Israeli historian Gila Fatran, Nástup was the first Czechoslovak newspaper "to come out openly with anti-Czech, antisemitic and anti-democratic statements". In its first issue in 1933, Nástup called for Czechoslovakia to become a federation, which was anathema at the time because it would require a fundamental change in the constitution. It opposed the proposal that the Slovak People's Party should support for Edvard Beneš in the 1935 Czechoslovak presidential election or join the government after the 1935 Czechoslovak parliamentary election, and tried to remove Jozef Tiso from a position of influence in the Slovak People's Party. The journal's hostility to the Czechoslovak state also led it to support the Sudeten German radical Konrad Henlein, and it was skeptical that the Slovak People's Party could accomplish its goals by democratic means.

The first issue also contained a pseudonymously authored two-part article on Adolf Hitler and Nazism, which concluded: "We are basically fighting for the same goals as German Nazism: for a political, economic and cultural renewal. Only our circumstances are different." The same article also condemned racism and violence as contrary to Catholic teaching, and Nazism as a potential enemy because it did not adhere to Christian values. The magazine at times admired Nazism in Germany, and promoted fascism to the Slovak People's Party, although it disagreed with the anti-clerical element of Nazism. Nevertheless, historian Thomas Lorman wrote that, despite attempts to distinguish its ideology from Nazism, this could come across as ambiguous or a "perfunctory afterthought". From its first issue, the paper predicted the victory of Nazism all over Europe.

Israeli historian Yetayashu Jelínek described Nástup as offering "a sui generis brand of extreme rightist ideology" because it insisted on an independent (as opposed to pro-German) foreign policy. The newspaper opposed alliance between the Soviet Union and Czechoslovakia; instead, Nástup preferred closer relations with the right-wing authoritarian regimes in Central Europe. As its primary audience was young Catholics, the periodical frequently aired grievances related to professors and the Slovak language in education. Viewing itself as part of a "fascist new order" in Europe, Nástup advocated for a racial or ethnic definition for the Slovak nation and "cleansing" of minority groups, especially Jews.

Nástup promoted antisemitism, and "blamed Jews for everything", including the French Revolution, liberalism, immoral capitalism, socialism, and an alleged global moral decline. Nástup also blamed Jews for the Russian Revolution and Soviet communism, according to the conspiracy theory of Judeo-Bolshevism. In the first issue, the paper argued for extending the Nazi boycott of Jewish businesses to Slovakia and urged readers to "shop only in Slovak shops... advertise only in Slovak newspapers... give jobs only to Slovaks". The periodical argued that Jews constituted a separate race from Slovaks. A typical claim was that Jews try "to subvert what is steadfast, to devalue what is valuable, to disrupt what is harmonizing, and to corrupt what is beautiful". The paper also connected the Czechoslovak tolerance for Jews with previous tolerance by Hungarian authorities, condemning both. According to Nástup in 1938:

A Jew brought up on the text of the Talmud will always remain Jewish, and can never become Christian... It is necessary to eliminate Jews from the life of Christian nations. It is necessary to chase Jews from Christian nations. Jews must be deprived of all influence, their property, acquired by fraudulent means, must be confiscated, we must begin to act.
