= Tatjana Tönsmeyer =

German historian

Tatjana Tönsmeyer (born 1968) is a German historian who studies Germany–Slovakia relations and Central European history. She is currently a professor at the University of Wuppertal. Her first book, Das Dritte Reich und die Slowakai, was based on her doctoral dissertation, while Adelige Moderne is based on her habilitation. Das Dritte Reich und die Slowakei, which focused in particular on the "advisors" Germany sent to Slovakia, received positive to mixed reviews; some reviewers thought that she ignored recent Slovak scholarship in favor of dated German scholarship.

== Works ==
- Tönsmeyer, Tatjana (2002). Das Dritte Reich und die Slowakei 1939-1945: politischer Alltag zwischen Kooperation und Eigensinn (in German). Schöningh. ISBN 978-3-506-77532-0.
- Tönsmeyer, Tatjana (2012). Adelige Moderne: Grossgrundbesitz und ländliche Gesellschaft in England und Böhmen 1848-1918 (in German). Böhlau Verlag. ISBN 978-3-412-20937-7.
