= Germany–Slovakia relations =

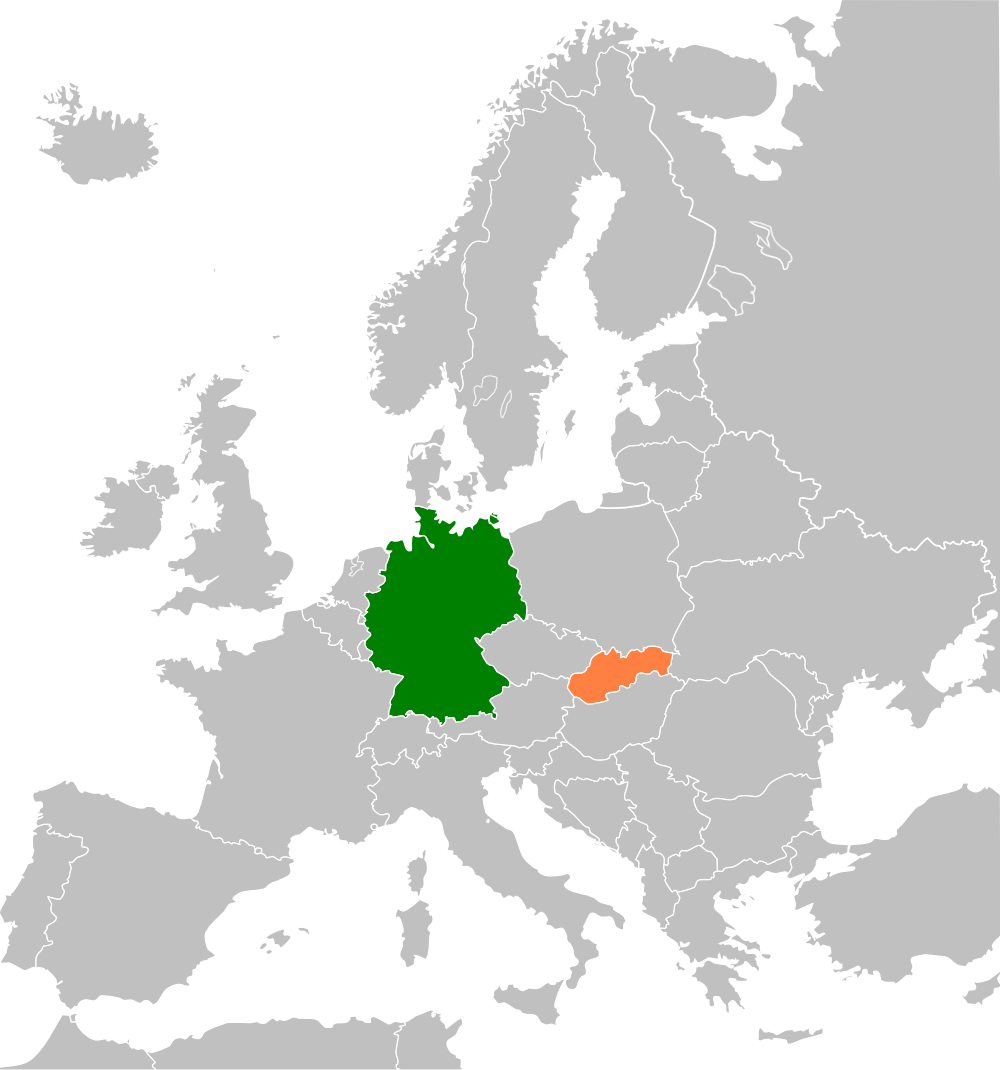

- Germany: Slovakia

Germany–Slovakia relations are foreign relations between Germany and Slovakia. Both countries established diplomatic relations in 1993 but previously had relations during World War II when Slovakia was a separate state, the Slovak Republic. Germany has an embassy in Bratislava. Slovakia has an embassy in Berlin, an embassy branch in Bonn, and a consulate-general in Munich. Germany plays an important part in the Slovak economy as it is Slovakia's main trading partner.

Both countries are full members of the European Union, NATO, Council of Europe and the Organization for Security and Co-operation in Europe. Germany has given full support to Slovakia's membership in the European Union and NATO.

== History ==
=== Weimar Republic ===
Parallel to the establishment of the Weimar Republic, Czechoslovakia was born. Slovakia was a part of this new-born state. German diplomats in Bratislava and in Košice tried to influence Czechoslovak domestic policy by allying with factions of the Carpathian Germans and the Slovak People's Party. Both groups in their majority proved to be incompatible with German goals in the region. Weimar's policy failed.

=== World War II ===
During World War II, Slovakia was an ally of Nazi Germany as part of the Axis. The Slovak Republic under President Jozef Tiso signed the Tripartite Pact on 24 November 1940. Slovakia had been closely aligned with Germany almost immediately from its declaration of independence from Czechoslovakia on 14 March 1939. Slovakia entered into a treaty of protection Schutzvertrag with Germany on 23 March 1939. This treaty aligned Slovakia's foreign and defence policies with Germany, and allowed German troops to form a protection zone in the western parts of Slovakia.

Slovak troops joined the German invasion of Poland, having interest in Spiš and Orava. Those two regions (along with Cieszyn Silesia) were divided and disputed between Poland and Czechoslovakia since 1918, until the Poles fully annexed them following the Munich agreement. After the September Campaign, Slovakia reclaimed control of those territories.

In July 1940, Germany successfully demanded the resignation of Slovak politicians who advocated an independent foreign policy at the Salzburg Conference. During the war, approximately 70,000 Slovak Jews were sent to concentration camps to perish in the Holocaust. In September 1942, a Slovak-German treaty was signed detailing the conditions for the deportation of Slovak Jews.

Slovakia was spared German military occupation until the Slovak National Uprising, which began on 29 August 1944, and was crushed by the Waffen SS and Slovak troops loyal to Jozef Tiso, dictator of Slovakia.

=== Post World War II ===
Following World War II, Slovak Socialist Republic became a communist state with the Czech Socialist Republic as Czechoslovakia. This continued until a peaceful dissolution in 1993 into the Slovak Republic and Czech Republic.

Relations during this period were primarily between the German Democratic Republic (East Germany) and Czechoslovakia under the Warsaw Pact.

=== Post 1992 ===
Following the creation of democratic Slovakia and German reunification, both countries traded under a free market economy.

In March 2001, a German court rejected compensation complaints from Slovakia's surviving Jews from the Holocaust. Claims were rejected again in 2002. In 2003, Slovak Jews made a collective claim of 77 million euros to Germany. The 2003 lawsuit filed against Germany by the Central Union of Jewish Religious Communities in the Slovak Republic (UZZNO) was made to reclaim compensation for monies paid by the wartime Slovak government to Germany to cover the cost of Germany's deportation of 57,000 members of the country's Jewish population.

== State visits ==
The following state visits have occurred in recent times: German Federal President Horst Köhler visited Slovakia on 2 November 2005. German Chancellor Angela Merkel paid her first official visit to the Slovak Republic on 11 May 2006.

President Ivan Gašparovič visited Germany in July 2006. In the same month, the new Slovak Foreign Minister Kubiš paid his first official visit to Berlin. Prime Minister Robert Fico visited Germany in April 2007.

== Economic relations ==
Germany is Slovakia's largest trading partner.

In 2003, Germany was the biggest investor in Slovakia, with its volume of direct investment at about 1.94 billion euro as of 31 March 2003. At the time, Germany made 26.4% of all foreign direct investments in Slovakia.

This trend has continued in 2009, around 400 German firms are active in Slovakia investing 2.5 billion euro, making Germany the biggest investor in Slovakia.

=== Car manufacturing ===
In 1991, Volkswagen AG opened a factory in Bratislava. Revenue from the plant in 2003 was 4.5 billion euro. By 2006, the company had invested 1.3 billion EUR in its operations and employed 9,000 staff at the time.

In April 2009, Volkswagen AG announced plans to build a new compact family vehicle in Slovakia. The company will invest about 308 million euros. VW currently builds its Touareg, Škoda Octavia as well as its Audi Q7 in Bratislava and employs about 7,800 people in the nation, which has emerged a major hub in the global car industry. Porsche also builds its Cayenne model in Bratislava.

== Cooperation ==
In 1997, the two countries signed a military cooperation agreement.

In 2003, an e-government partnership was developed between the countries with the assistance of Siemens and Microsoft.

Key bilateral agreements include those on social insurance (instrument of ratification signed on 17 October 2003) and on road transport (signed on 14 June 2002).

== International organizations ==
While Germany was one of the founding members of the EU, Slovakia joined in 2004. Germany joined NATO in 1955, and Slovakia joined in 2004.

== Resident diplomatic missions ==
- Germany has an embassy in Bratislava.
- Slovakia has an embassy in Berlin and a consulate-general in Munich.
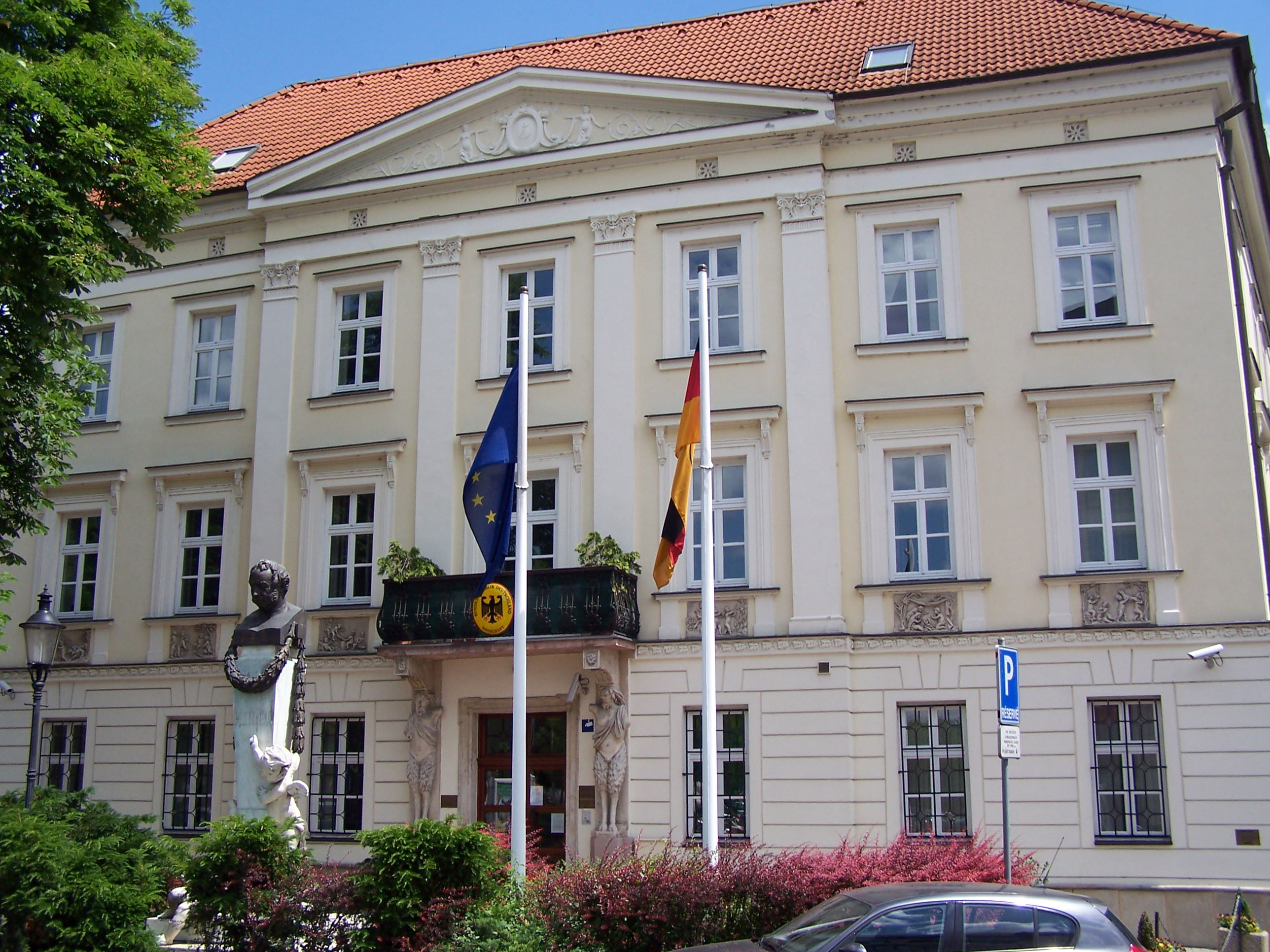
Embassy of Germany in Bratislava

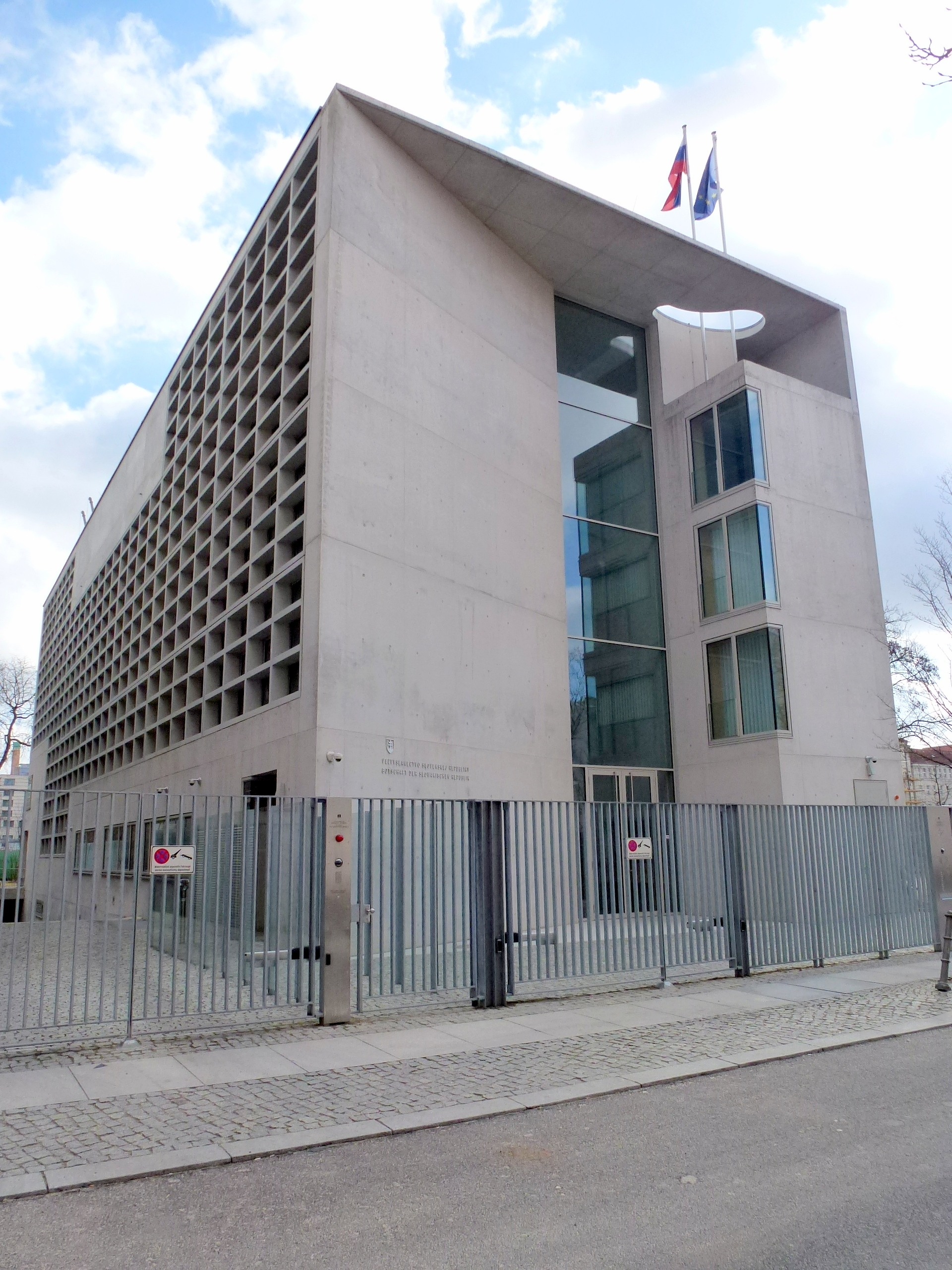
Embassy of Slovakia in Berlin

== See also ==
- Foreign relations of Germany
- Foreign relations of Slovakia
- Slovaks in Germany
- Germans in Slovakia
