= Carey Gillam =

American journalist

- Born: Overland Park, Kansas, U.S.
- Occupation: Investigative journalist

Carey Gillam is an American investigative journalist and author.

Gillam was born in Overland Park, Kansas. She started her career as a general assignment reporter for two small newspapers in Kansas. Gillam spent several years working for the chain of business publications owned by American City Business Journals before joining the Thomson Corporation as a banking reporter covering southeast regional bank holding companies. She joined Reuters News Agency in 1998 where she covered agriculture, commodities markets, and general news assignments. Gillam left Reuters in October 2015 and has since appeared in The Guardian, Time, UnDark and other outlets.

In 2016 Gillam joined U.S. Right to Know, an investigative research group funded by the Organic Consumers Association. In 2022, she became the managing editor of The New Lede, a news organization funded by the Environmental Working Group. She won the One World Media Environmental Reporting Award in 2025, together with Lighthouse Reports, for a series of article on the propaganda of agrochemical and biotech companies in defense of pesticides and GMOs in Africa and Europe.

Gillam's 2017 book Whitewash: The Story of a Weed Killer, Cancer, and the Corruption of Science received the 2018 Rachel Carson Book Award from the Society of Environmental Journalists.

Gillam's articles have been accused of being anti-science and spreading disinformation on a biotech industry-supported website.
