= Ferdinand Ďurčanský =

Slovak politician and National leader

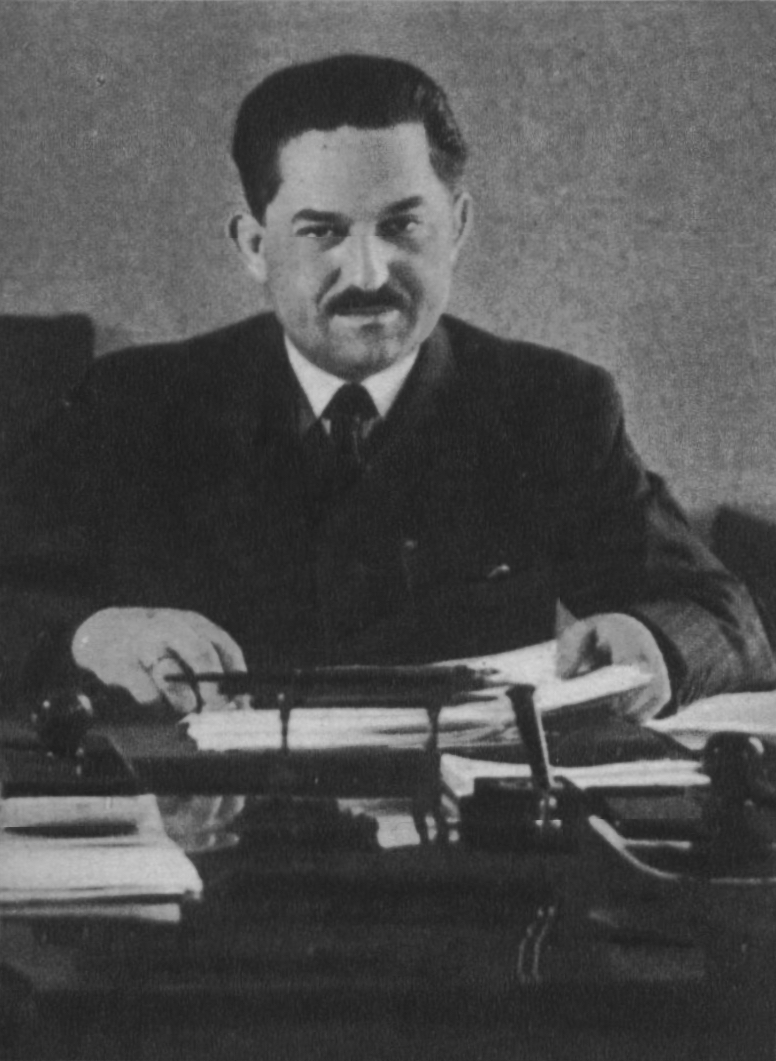
- Born: Ferdinand Ďurčanský; 18 December 1906; Rajec, Kingdom of Hungary, Austria-Hungary (now Slovakia)
- Died: 15 March 1974 (aged 67); Munich, Bavaria, West Germany
- Resting place: Waldfriedhof, Munich, West Germany
- Citizenship: Slovak Republic
- Education: Doctorate in law
- Alma mater: Institut des Hautes Études Internationales in Paris, University of Bratislava, The Hague Academy of International Law
- Occupation: Lawyer
- Known for: Politician
- Title: Chairman of the Anti-Bolshevik Bloc of Nations
- Predecessor: Veli Kajum-Khan
- Successor: F. Farkas de Kisbarnak
- Political party: Slovak People's Party

Ferdinand Ďurčanský (18 December 1906 – 15 March 1974) was a Slovak nationalist leader who for a time served with as a minister in the government of the Axis-aligned Slovak State in 1939 and 1940. He was known for spreading virulent antisemitic propaganda, although he left the government before the Holocaust in Slovakia was fully implemented. After the war, he joined the Gehlen Organization.

== Nationalism ==
Born in Rajec, in the Trencsén County of the Kingdom of Hungary (present-day Slovakia), he was educated at the Institute des Hautes Études Internationales in Paris, the University of Bratislava and The Hague Academy of International Law, receiving his law doctorate and working as a professor of law in Bratislava.

Ďurčanský gained a grounding in nationalism in the universities. With Rodobrana declining in influence during the mid-1930s, the focus of Slovak extreme nationalist discontent shifted onto the journal Nástup, which had a university student and graduate readership and which was edited by Ďurčanský. Unlike some of his contemporaries, who advocated autonomy, Ďurčanský was a supporter of a fully independent Slovakia, and when he and Jozef Tiso visited Adolf Hitler in 1938, it was only Ďurčanský who pressed the Nazi leader on the issue. In October 1938, he told Hermann Göring that Slovakia's "Jewish problem will be solved similarly to Germany's".

== Under the Nazis ==
His followers, who came to be known as the 'Young Generation', held a number of posts in the Slovak People's Party administration of Vojtech Tuka, with Ďurčanský himself serving as Minister for Home and Foreign Affairs. He was dismissed following the Salzburg Conference, because the Germans disapproved of his independent-minded foreign policy (he had attempted to maintain communication with the Western powers and keep friendly relations with the Soviet Union).

Tiso attempted to recall him in 1944, but the Nazis refused. Nonetheless, he remained a strong supporter of Tiso and collaboration, attempting to organise resistance to the Soviet Union until early 1945 when he fled to Austria.

== Plot exposed ==
The United Nations War Crimes Commission accepted Czechoslovak charges that Ďurčanský had been paid by the Nazi secret service and had been complicit in the deaths of Jews. Condemned to death in absentia, he nevertheless escaped to the West in 1945 and became a stern critic of the communist government.

According to Mark Aarons and John Loftus Ďurčanský was a member of Intermarium, an underground anti-communist network with its headquarters in Paris that played a leading role in helping Nazis escape justice after the war and which was under the control of British intelligence. Having fled to the Vatican, Ďurčanský was said to have linked up with other like-minded members of the group in order to conspire to restore the Slovak regime as well as other rightist totalitarian regimes in the newly communist states of Eastern Europe. To this end Ďurčanský made daily broadcasts to the Slovak areas of Czechoslovakia (according to The New York Times) whilst also publishing leaflets stating that he would soon return to take over as Prime Minister of an independent Slovakia.

Ďurčanský established his own Slovak Liberation Committee as a basis for such plots although his attempts were severely undermined in September 1947 when General Ferjenčík concluded an investigation in which he revealed full details of Ďurčanský's group, as well as the level of infiltration by communist agents. Ferjenčík's report was used as the basis for a full takeover by the Communist Party of Czechoslovakia. The speed with which his coup plot collapsed and the completeness of communist knowledge led to speculation amongst British intelligence that Ďurčanský was in fact a double agent but no evidence was forthcoming and before long he had risen to become President of Intermarium.

== Later activity ==
Having had his plot exposed Ďurčanský took advantage of the ratlines in operation to escape to Argentina. He had for some time been under the protection of British agent Kim Philby and when he was appointed Senior Liaison Officer to the United States and Canada in 1949 he attempted to arrange for Ďurčanský to be moved to North America. However at this point the Central Intelligence Agency had thrown its weight behind a moderate group called the Czech Democrats and rejected the chance to work with a Slovak separatist with a collaborationist background. Philby did however manage to secure entry into Canada on a British visa in December 1950 for Ďurčanský and he made the country his base of operations for the next few years and visited the country regularly on speaking engagements into the 1970s.

Ďurčanský returned to Europe in 1952, settling in Munich and conducting much of his work on behalf of Slovak independence from West Germany. However he spoke to various Slovak groups in the United States in 1959 with the United States Department of State claiming that he was granted a visa as 'membership in or affiliation with the defunct Nazi Party in itself no longer constitutes a ground of ineligibility.' His work against the Czechoslovak communist government included spells as President of both the Slovak Committee for Action Abroad and the Anti-Bolshevik Bloc of Nations. He also wrote extensively for rightist journals such as Nation Europa, Zeitschrift für Geopolitik and Politische Studien.

Ďurčanský died of natural causes in Munich.
