= Salzburg Conference =

1940 conference between Nazi Germany and Slovakia

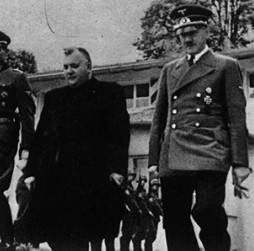
Jozef Tiso and Adolf Hitler at the Salzburg Conference

The Salzburg Conference (German: Salzburger Diktat) was a conference between Nazi Germany and the Slovak State, held on 28 July 1940, in Salzburg, Reichsgau Ostmark (present-day Austria). The Germans demanded the expulsion of the Nástup faction of the Slovak People's Party from the Slovak government because of its independent foreign policy, threatening to unilaterally revoke the protection guarantees that Slovakia had obtained in the 1939 German–Slovak treaty.

The result was Slovak capitulation to German demands and the replacement of Nástup supporters by members of the pro-German radical faction. Ultimately, the Slovak State became more strongly oriented towards Germany, especially in the area of anti-Jewish measures. However, aspects of the Slovak State's administration, such as the lack of qualified Slovak People's Party supporters in high-level positions and the adoption of the Führerprinzip with the conservative politician Jozef Tiso as its supreme leader, limited the impact of the German ultimatum.

== Background ==
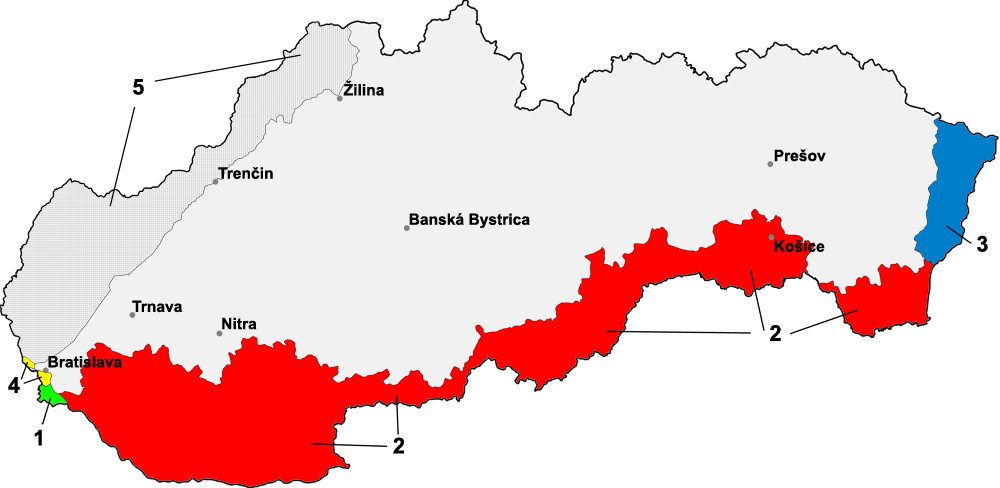
Slovak territorial losses to Hungary in 1938 and 1939

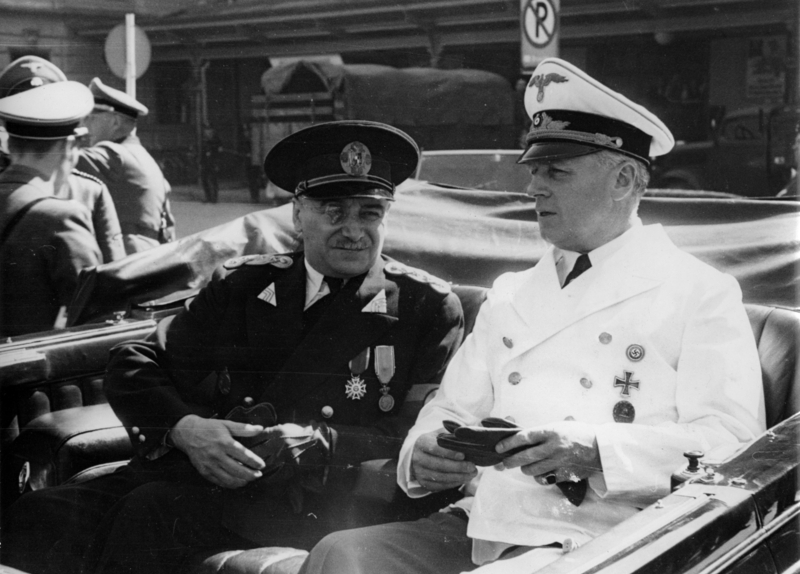
Joachim von Ribbentrop (right) meets the Prime Minister of Romania, Ion Gigurtu, in Salzburg, 27 July 1940

Nazi Germany and Fascist Italy awarded much of southern Slovakia (then part of Czechoslovakia) to Hungary with the First Vienna Award in November 1938. On 14 March 1939, the Slovak State proclaimed its independence under German protection, with Germany invading and annexing the Czech rump state the following day. In a treaty signed on 23 March, Slovakia renounced much of its foreign-policy and military autonomy to Germany in exchange for border guarantees and economic assistance.

The Slovak State was a one-party state dominated by the Slovak People's Party, which had two main factions, radical and conservative/clerical. The radical branch was led by Vojtech Tuka and Alexander Mach, commander of the paramilitary Hlinka Guard, and was supported by Germany due to its acceptance of German dominion. President Jozef Tiso's clerical branch was more popular among the Catholic clergy and the population. These factions engaged in a power struggle, fighting for German support. Another faction was a group of intellectuals centered around the journal Nástup, which was radical in its authoritarianism but opposed the imitation of Germany and insisted on an independent foreign policy; foreign minister Ferdinand Ďurčanský belonged to this group. Germany sought the expulsion of the Nástup group from positions of influence, as it could work with Tiso's faction which tended towards pragmatism in its foreign policy.

The summit took place during a quiet spell in the war, shortly after the fall of France and while the defeat of the United Kingdom and victory of Nazi Germany appeared likely. Germany's military successes strengthened its negotiating position against its much smaller ally. Germany sought to use the favorable conditions to deepen its sphere of influence in the Danube region and force its allies in the area into a closer relationship. Shortly before the summit, Hitler had met with Hungarian officials on 10 July, and with Romanian and Bulgarian officials on the two nights immediately preceding the Salzburg meeting.

== Demands ==
In mid-July 1940, German dictator Adolf Hitler invited Tiso, Tuka, and Mach to a summit held in Salzburg. The Sicherheitsdienst wanted Ďurčanský to be invited, so that it could thwart any attempts by the latter to escape losing power.

On 28 July, Tiso first met privately with German foreign minister Joachim von Ribbentrop, who informed the Slovaks that Germany considered Slovakia within its Lebensraum, and therefore justified interference in Slovakia's internal affairs. He demanded that Tiso renounce his goal of a Catholic clerical state and dismiss Ďurčanský, due to the latter's "register of sins"—he had attempted to maintain communication with the Western powers and keep friendly relations with the Soviet Union. In another meeting, Adolf Hitler hinted that failure to comply would leave the Slovak State at the mercy of Hungary, by revoking the protection guarantees that Slovakia had obtained in the 1939 German–Slovak treaty. Tiso told Hitler that Slovakia had no "leanings toward Russia within the framework of a Pan-Slavic policy. […] The leaflets [backing] such [actions] were machinations of Jews, Magyars, and Czechs designed to blacken Slovakia in the eyes of Germany."

The Slovaks requested a revision of the First Vienna Award. Specifically, they wanted six former districts to be returned to Slovakia: Vráble-Šurany, Lučenec, Jelšava, Košice, north Sátoraljaújhely and Sobrance District—3,600 square kilometres (1,400 sq mi). According to the Slovak foreign ministry, these areas contained 209,000 Slovaks and 100,000 Hungarians. During the meeting with Hitler Ribbentrop interjected to say that a revision was "out of the question".

According to Israeli historian Yeshayahu Jelinek, "we lack many details regarding the meeting, particularly about instructions, if any, given to Tuka and Mach".

== Result ==
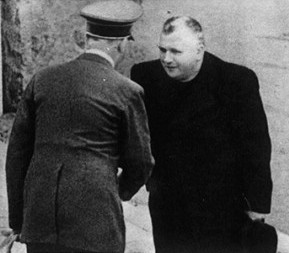
Tiso and Hitler shake hands at the conference

The Slovaks conceded to the German ultimatum and agreed to replace influential Nástupists with reliably pro-German radicals. Ďurčanský was replaced as interior minister by Mach, while Tuka became foreign minister. Jozef M. Kirschbaum, another Nástupist, was dismissed as Secretary-General of the Slovak People's Party, while Konštantín Čulen, the head of the Propaganda Ministry, was replaced by the radical Karol Murgaš. Nevertheless, the Germans recognized that the radical candidates were not as competent as the men that they replaced, and were therefore careful not to go too far in demanding influential offices for them. Ďurčanský later claimed that his dismissal proved that he was anti-Nazi and actually a "friend" of Jews.

The conference marked a success for the radical faction of the party and a defeat for Tiso's clerical faction. Tiso considered the summit "the worst box on the ears that I ever received". He offered his resignation. None of the Slovak leaders (except Mach) were happy with the result; Tuka had hoped to become president or defense minister and was ill-equipped to deal with the demands of the new offices he had obtained.

After the conference, the new government "oriented definitively and exclusively on Germany", in the words of Jan Rychlík. The conference also resulted in an intensification of the Slovak State's anti-Jewish policy, which was now modeled on that of Germany. As a reaction to the Salzburg talks, the Slovak People's Party embraced the Führerprinzip ("Führer principle"), putting Tiso in a position of complete authority and bypassing the German-mandated political changes. Another effect that limited the effect of the German diktat was that there were few Slovak People's Party supporters qualified for high office, partly because of the reliance of the Czechoslovak state on Czech bureaucrats. Therefore, the government relied heavily on Slovaks who did not support the party (four-fifths of the Foreign Affairs officials who had reported directly to Ďurčanský had held similar positions in the Czechoslovak government and were almost certainly not Slovak People's Party supporters). Leading officials such as Karol Klinovský, head of the Presidium of the Slovak Foreign Ministry since 1939, were left undisturbed for lack of a qualified replacement.

=== Advisers ===
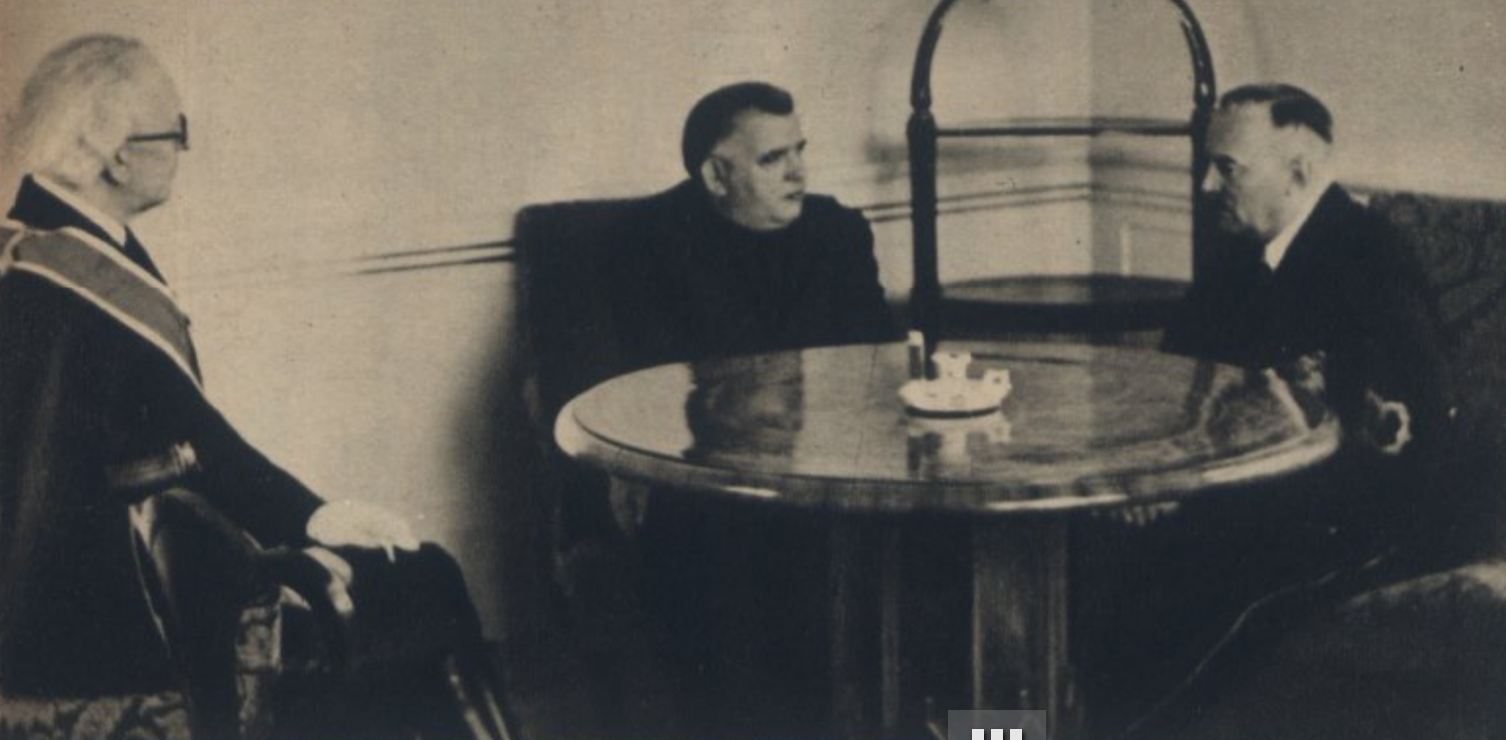
Manfred von Killinger meets Tiso (center) and Tuka (left), August 1940

Another result of the Salzburg talks was the appointment of various German advisers to Slovakia, although these advisers were not completely new, nor were they unique to Slovakia. The previous German envoy Hans Bernard was replaced by Manfred von Killinger, a Sturmabteilung officer who described his purpose as making Slovakia "economically 100 per cent at [our] disposal". Killinger was accompanied by a staff of German economic experts. The other advisers appointed in the months following Salzburg were:

- SS-Obersturmbannführer Ludwig Hahn (police)
- Major Kurt Güdler of the Schutzpolizei (police)
- SS-Sturmbannführer Viktor Nageler (Hlinka Guard)
- SS-Obersturmbannführer Albert Smagon (social issues)
- SS-Hauptsturmführer Dieter Wisliceny ("Jewish Question")
- Hans Pehm (Slovak People's Party)
- Franz Wechselberger (forestry)
- Anton Endrös (propaganda)
- SS-Obersturmführer Rudolf Dienst (police)
- Hans Hamscha (agriculture)
- Police Captain Holst (police)
- Police Major Müller (police)

Including staff, in the end about seventy or eighty people were part of this advisory corps.
