= Congressional Accountability Project =

US advocacy group

The Congressional Accountability Project is an advocacy group "which is affiliated with Ralph Nader."

In 1997 they accused a member of congress of staying at the home of "a lobbyist ... who had formerly been his chief of staff for 22 years" ("which could constitute free lodging") and thereby "violated the House gift ban."

Directed 1993–2007 by Gary Ruskin, the "self-styled Congressional reform organization" was "founded by" Nader, was described by The New York Times as "nonpartisan;" The Washington Post used the description "public watchdog."

The acronym CAP has been used.

== Earlier operation ==
A 1991 issue of an Oklahoma newspaper mentioned "Claire Riley of the group" regarding selling "mantel clocks, clock radios, crystal goblets and ice buckets, brass candlesticks ... all priced below retail to varying degrees." These and "wrapping paper ... half the retail price" are described by the organization as "the congressional good life subsidized by taxpayers" fit Nader's claim of "corruption in the U. S. Congress."

Riley was described as "director of the Congressional Accountability Project" in a 1991 UPI story. and as "Lehigh Valley project director for the Congressional Accountability Project" in 1990. and worked on projects with Nader earlier.

== Partisanship ==
Although The New York Times used the label "nonpartisan," some have disagreed.

== See also ==
- Ralph Nader
- Congressional Research Service
