= Germany and Israel: Whitewashing and Statebuilding =

2020 book by Daniel Marwecki

- Author: Daniel Marwecki
- Publication date: April 1, 2020
- ISBN: 9-781-78738318-0

Germany and Israel: Whitewashing and Statebuilding is a 2020 book by Daniel Marwecki covering seven decades of Germany–Israel relations after World War II.

== Content ==
The book covers the 1952 reparations agreement, the growing cooperation between the countries before the Six Day War in 1967, and Konrad Adenauer's Vergangenheitspolitik ("policy for dealing with the past") to gain Israeli recognition for the official position of Germany that West Germany represented a clean break from Nazi Germany. This included Israel's cooperation in not criticizing the "wall of silence" that was constructed around the Nazi period, including the integration of ex-Nazis into political offices. The controversial thesis of the book is that Germany's material support for the fledging Israeli state was offered in exchange for the whitewashing of its Nazi past. Marwecki characterizes the diplomacy between the two countries as rational and morally nihilistic, based on Israel exchanging a post-Holocaust "whitewashing" and normalization of Germany's international standing for military and economic assistance in support of its statebuilding project, noting the differences in the terminology used by the countries to describe the 1952 reparations agreement (Israel called it Shilumim, a debt paid but unforgiven, while Germany used the term Wiedergutmachungsabkommen meaning 'to make good again').

Marwecki says that Germany acted in its own sovereign interest and "never assumed the role of the penitent".

Marwecki's book includes discussion of closer ties with unified Germany including Angela Merkel's 2008 declaration in the Knesset that Germany had a "special historical responsibility for Israel's security" as part of its Staatsräson.

== Reception ==
The book received multiple positive reviews.

Some scholars have disagreed with Marwecki's characterization of Adenauer's support for Israel. Roni Stauber notes that Israeli historian Yeshayahu Jelínek "emphasized Adenauer's complex motivations". Agreeing with Jelinek, Stauber says that realpolitik alone "cannot explain the extraordinary decisions that Adenauer made in 1960 to provide military and financial support to Israel". Lorena De Vita notes that a growing body of work on German-Israeli relations undercuts the author's claim of "academic negligence".
