= U.S. Right to Know =

Nonprofit organization

U.S. Right To Know (USRTK) is a nonprofit organization. It was founded in 2014 by Gary Ruskin and Stacy Malkin. The organization has been primarily funded by Organic Consumers Association starting with a $44,500 grant to launch the organization. The Organic Consumers Association was the sole funder during USRTK's first years and remained as its largest funder in later years with payments totaling more than $1 million as of 2021.

The organization is known for anti-GMO activism, and for promoting the COVID-19 lab leak theory.

In 2025, USRTK filed a public records lawsuit against the University of North Carolina at Chapel Hill for withholding many research documents belonging to Ralph Baric.

== See also ==
- Carey Gillam former USRTK Research Director
