= Germany–Israel relations =

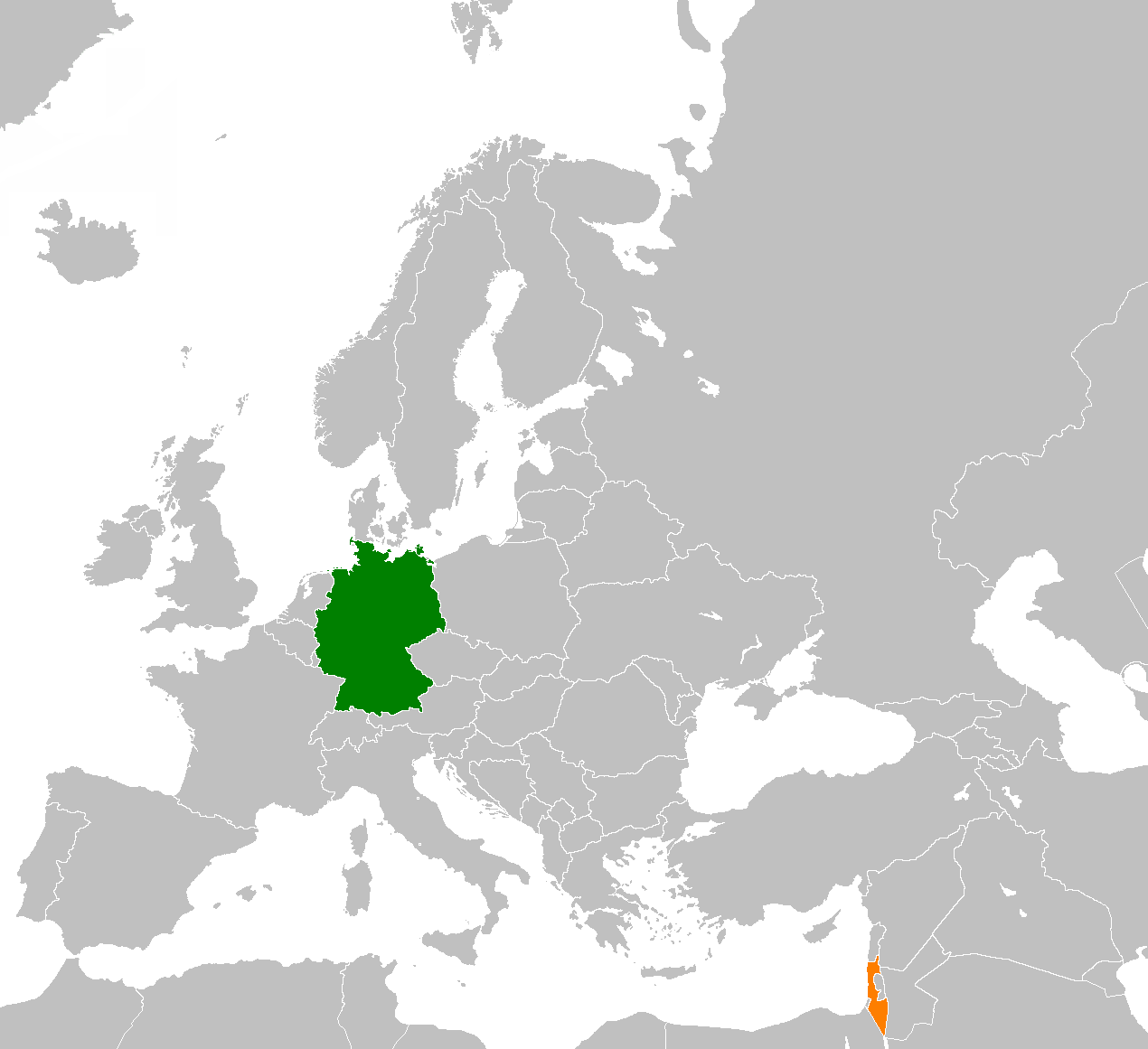

- Germany: Israel

Diplomatic mission
- Embassy of Germany, Tel Aviv: Embassy of Israel, Berlin

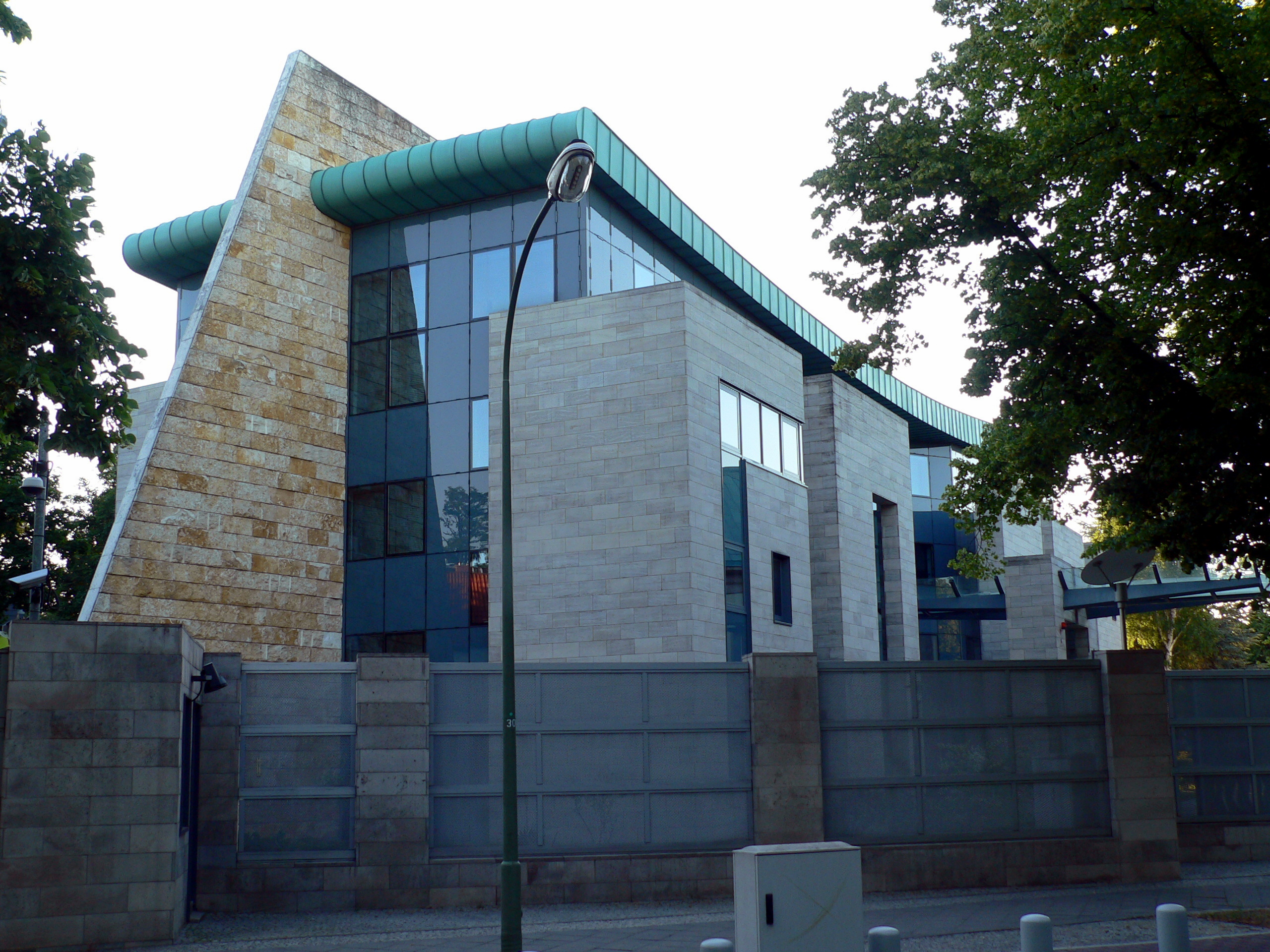
Israeli embassy in Berlin, Germany

Germany–Israel relations (German: Deutsch-israelische Beziehungen; Hebrew: יחסי גרמניה-ישראל) are the diplomatic relationship between the Federal Republic of Germany and the State of Israel. After the end of World War II and the Holocaust, relations gradually thawed as West Germany offered to pay reparations to Israel in 1952 and diplomatic relations were officially established in 1965. Nonetheless, a deep mistrust of the German people remained widespread in Israel and the Jewish diaspora communities worldwide for many years after. Relations between East Germany and Israel never materialised. Today, Israel and Germany maintain a "special relationship" based on shared beliefs and a combination of historical perspectives. A central pillar of this relationship is Germany's commitment to Israel's security as part of its Staatsräson (reason of state), a policy that has also sparked domestic and international debate regarding its political and legal implications.

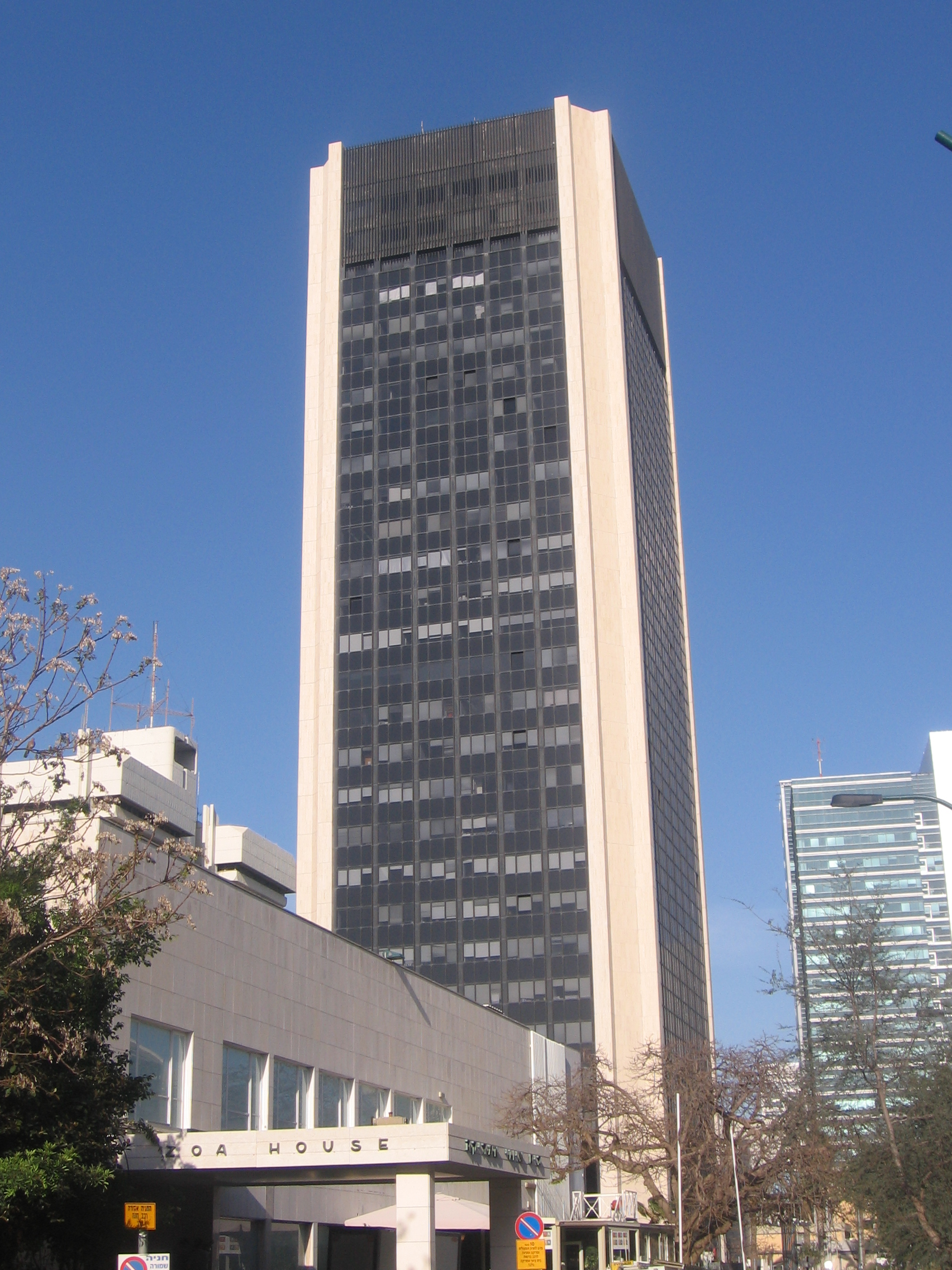
German Embassy, Tel Aviv

Germany is represented in Israel through its embassy in Tel Aviv and honorary consuls in Eilat and Haifa. Israel is represented in Germany through its embassy in Berlin and its Consulate-General in Munich. Both countries are full members of the Organisation for Economic Co-operation and Development and the Union for the Mediterranean.

== History ==
Israel, founded in 1948, had no relations with Germany due to the Holocaust and until the reparations agreement with West Germany in 1952. The Israeli passport stated "This passport is valid for all countries except Germany", but this statement was removed after the reparations agreement with West Germany.

=== Reparations agreement ===
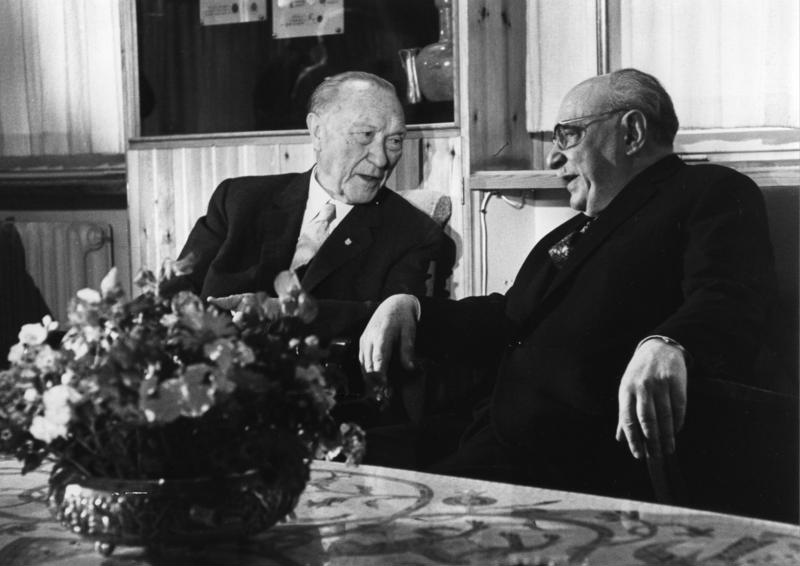
Konrad Adenauer meeting with Zalman Shazar in Israel

In the early 1950s, the negotiations began between the Prime Minister of Israel David Ben-Gurion, the chairman of the Jewish Claims Conference Nahum Goldmann, and the Chancellor of West Germany Konrad Adenauer. Because of the sensitivity of accepting reparations, this decision was intensely debated in the Israeli Knesset. In 1952, the Reparations Agreement was signed. All in all, as of 2007 Germany had paid 25 billion euros in reparations to the Israeli state and individual Israeli Holocaust survivors. This commitment, driven by moral and political responsibility, became central to its Staatsräson— West Germany's post-war national interest. Staatsräson involved addressing historical debts, compensating victims, ensuring Israel's security, and thus restoring Germany's international credibility. There were significant reconciliation efforts, particularly from religious institutions such as the German Coordinating-Council for Christian-Jewish cooperation and the Action Reconciliation Service for Peace.

In 1950, Hermann Maas became the first German to be officially invited to Israel. It took another fifteen years until West Germany and Israel established diplomatic relations on 12 May 1965. Since then, mutual state visits regularly occur, although for many years relations were affected by the fact that Jews both in and outside Israel maintained a deep mistrust of Germany and the German people. German President Roman Herzog's first official visit outside Europe was to Israel in 1994. Israeli Prime Minister Ehud Barak was the first foreign leader received in Berlin after the German government's relocation from Bonn in 1999.

=== Eichmann trial ===
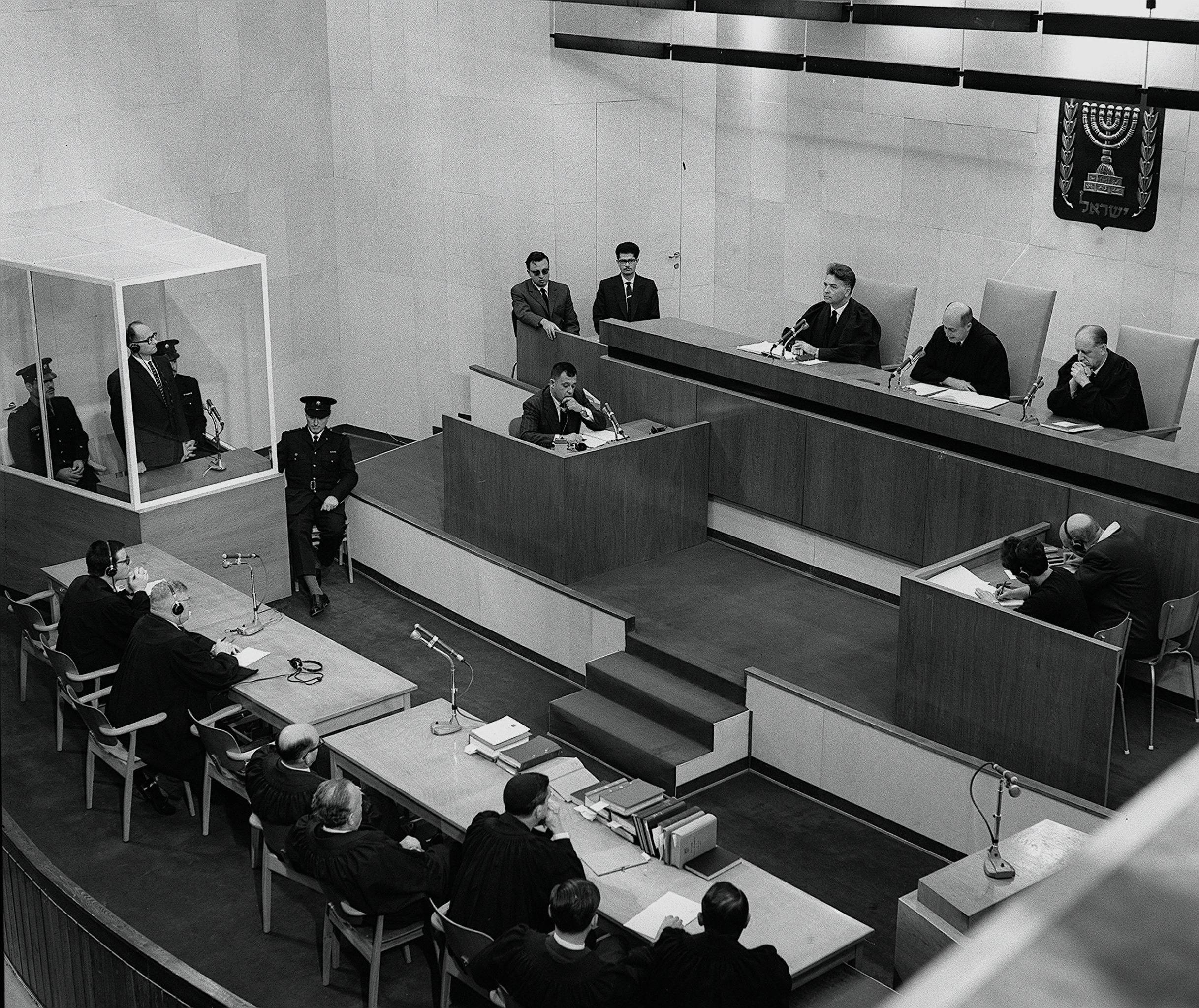
Adolf Eichmann (inside glass booth) is sentenced to death by the Supreme Court of Israel at the conclusion of the trial.

West German Chancellor Konrad Adenauer attempted to influence the trial of Nazi war criminal and Holocaust architect Adolf Eichmann in Israel because he feared that the Nazi past of some senior West German officials, including Hans Globke, would come to light during the trial.

Hans Globke's key position as chief of staff to Adenauer, responsible for matters of national security, made both the West German government and CIA officials wary of exposing his past, despite their full knowledge of it. This led, for instance, to the withholding of Adolf Eichmann's alias from the Israeli government and Nazi hunters in the 1950s. The German Federal Intelligence Service (BND) had known since 1952 that Eichmann was living in Buenos Aires and working at Mercedes-Benz.

== Bilateral cooperation since 2000 ==
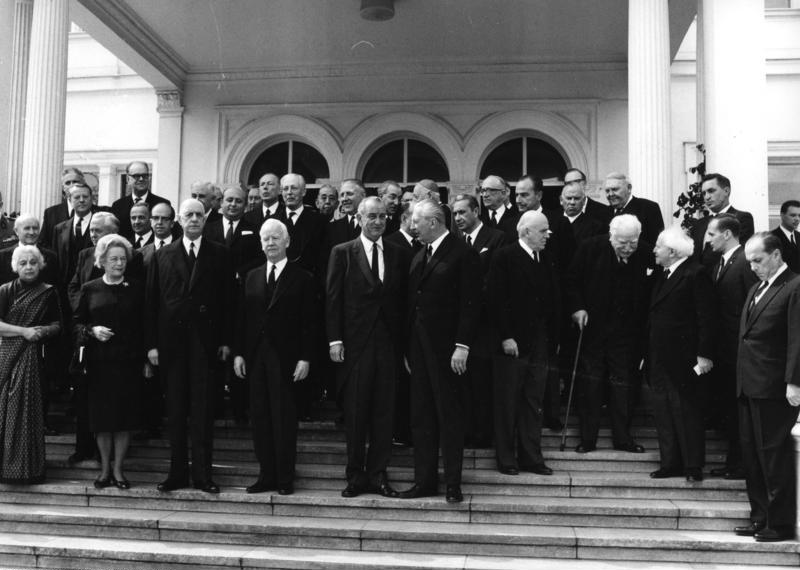
Ben-Gurion and Kurt Georg Kiesinger attending funeral of Adenauer in Bonn in 1967

German Chancellor Gerhard Schröder visited Israel in October 2000. In 2005, the year of the 40th anniversary of bilateral diplomatic relations, German President Horst Köhler and Israel's former President Moshe Katsav exchanged state visits. The two countries established a network of contacts between parliamentary, governmental, and non-governmental organizations, as well as strategic and security ties.

On 30 January 2008, Chancellor Angela Merkel's spokesman announced that the German and Israeli cabinets would meet in Israel in March 2008, in honor of Israel's 60th anniversary celebrations. This was the first time the German cabinet met with another cabinet outside of Europe. The joint meeting was expected to become an annual occurrence. On 17 March 2008, Merkel paid a three-day visit to Israel to mark Israel's 60th anniversary. Merkel and Israeli Prime Minister Ehud Olmert signed agreements on a range of projects in education, the environment and defense. Merkel spoke of her support for the Jewish state during an unprecedented speech to the Knesset on 18 March 2008.

In January 2011, Merkel visited Israel and met with Prime Minister Benjamin Netanyahu and opposition Kadima leader Tzipi Livni. In February 2011, Netanyahu called Merkel to discuss Germany's vote in the United Nations Security Council in favor of the Palestinian proposal. Merkel reportedly told Netanyahu that he had disappointed her and done nothing to advance peace. To clear the air, Netanyahu was invited for a reconciliation visit to Berlin in mid-March 2011. In September 2011, Merkel criticized Israel for construction in settlements in Jerusalem and said that the new housing permits raised doubts over Israel's readiness to negotiate with the Palestinians.

Germany was one of 14 countries that voted against Palestine's UNESCO membership in October 2011, within the context of the Palestine 194 initiative. When Israel announced that building settlements would continue in response to Palestinian attempts to declare statehood unilaterally, Germany threatened to stop deliveries to Israel of submarines capable of firing nuclear warheads.

Deutsche Bahn, the German national railway, in May 2011 pulled out of the high-speed railway to Jerusalem project because the line will pass in part through the West Bank. According to press reports, the German transport minister Peter Ramsauer told Deutsche Bahn's CEO that the projected rail line was "problematic from a political perspective" and violated international law. As a result, the company, which is owned by the German government, withdrew from the project. The company's decision was seen as a victory for left-wing Israeli and Palestinian activists who had waged a campaign within the context of the international Boycott, Divestment and Sanctions movement.

In May 2019, the Bundestag passed a resolution condemning BDS as antisemitism. In March 2022, the newly elected Chancellor of Germany, Olaf Scholz, made his first official visit to Israel.

== Israel in the Federal German Reason of State ==
The guiding principle that Israel's security is part of Germany's reason of state (German: Staatsräson; French: raison d'état) developed gradually out of West Germany's policy of remembrance following the Holocaust, the early Federal Republic's policy of reparations, and the special German-Israeli relationship since the 1950s.

Chancellor Konrad Adenauer had already justified the rapprochement with Israel by citing Germany's great political and moral obligation toward the Jewish state. In his speech to the Bundestag on 27 September 1951, Adenauer spoke of an obligation to provide moral and material compensation to the Jewish people and declared that the Federal Republic was aware of the "immeasurable suffering" that had been caused in the name of the German people. The 1952 Luxembourg Reparations Agreement is considered a central starting point for the special German–Israeli relationship. From the very beginning, these relations were shaped by both moral and geopolitical considerations. Adenauer combined moral responsibility with foreign policy pragmatism and the goal of the Federal Republic's international rehabilitation. Research shows that West German policy toward Israel since the 1950s cannot be explained solely by the memory of the Holocaust. Frank Stern also described early postwar West German culture as shaped by a political philosemitism that often served, simultaneously, to morally reintegrate Germany into the West.

The term Staatsräson was initially used in relation to Israel primarily in diplomatic and foreign policy contexts. In April 2005, the German ambassador to Israel, Rudolf Dreßler, stated that the "secured existence of Israel" was in Germany's national interest and was therefore "part of our reason of state". This guiding principle gained international attention, particularly through Chancellor Angela Merkel. Merkel officially articulated this in 2006 by describing Israel's right to exist as a German national interest. According to the Israeli ambassador at the time, this statement marked a departure from German neutrality in the Middle East. Merkel reaffirmed this stance later in her speech to the United Nations General Assembly in 2007 and again in her address to the Knesset on 18 March 2008, in which she stated:

This historic responsibility of Germany is part of my country's raison d'état. This means that, for me as German Chancellor, Israel's security is never negotiable.

Merkel reiterated this position on multiple occasions, including during her farewell visit to Israel in 2021. The guiding principle evolved into a central reference point of German foreign policy toward Israel. It was incorporated into the federal government's 2021 coalition agreement and was supported across party lines by large segments of the political establishment. In light of the ongoing Europeanization of German Middle East policy, an increasing need emerged to align German reason of state with the policies of European partners. Even though Staatsräson is neither constitutionally nor legally binding, it is widely understood as a non-negotiable guiding principle of the German government, rooted in the memory of the Holocaust and moral responsibility.

Political scientists describe Israel as an integral part of Germany's "ontological security", since the relationship with Israel was closely linked to the Federal Republic's self-image as a liberal, democratic state and its break with its Nazi past. They believe that maintaining the special relationship was essential for German self-identity, especially regarding the alarming rise in antisemitic motivated criminal offenses in Germany since 7 October 2023. At the same time, German policy toward Israel had been marked by tension: on the one hand, historical responsibility toward Israel lay at the heart of German reason of state; on the other hand, the Federal Republic traditionally invoked universalist principles such as human rights, international law, and a rules-based international order. This tension was particularly evident in German governments' criticism of Israeli settlement construction and Israeli policy in the occupied territories.

Following Hamas's terrorist attack on Israel on 7 October 2023, Chancellor Olaf Scholz echoed Merkel's guiding principle and declared on 8 October 2023: "Israel's security is German raison d'état". Unlike Merkel, Scholz refrained from saying it was merely "part" of German national interest.

Since June 2024, the new Nationality Act (§ 10 (1) No. 1a StAG) requires naturalization applicants to make a commitment "to Germany's special historical responsibility for the Nazi regime of injustice and its consequences." Furthermore, Saxony-Anhalt introduced a requirement that prospective German citizens must sign a written declaration in which they recognize Israel's right to exist and condemn any actions directed against this right.

In this context, in 2025, Middle East expert Peter Lintl spoke of an "ontological dissonance" in German policy toward Israel: The invocation of historical responsibility toward Israel was increasingly in conflict with universalist principles such as human rights and international law.

=== Criticism and debate ===
Critics, including former Chancellor Helmut Schmidt, described Merkel's stance as an emotionally understandable, "but foolish view that could have very serious consequences." During his visit to Israel in 2012, Federal President Joachim Gauck deliberately avoided using the term Staatsräson and expressed concern that invoking the reason of state entailed obligations that the state may not be able or willing to fulfill.

Germany's stance during the Gaza War starting in 2023 led to increased international and domestic criticism of the concept of reason of state. Political scientists and historians such as Jannis Julien Grimm, Enzo Traverso, and Daniel Marwecki criticised the German government for providing political and diplomatic support for Israel's actions despite possible violations of international humanitarian law, and argue that the concept of reason of state and the memory of the Holocaust were being used to justify support for controversial Israeli policies and to limit critical voices in Germany. In 2025, Jannis Julien Grimm and Marcus Schneider argued that the German position had contributed significantly to the perception of Western double standards, particularly in the Global South, and had damaged Germany's credibility as an advocate of a "values-based and feminist foreign policy."

In December 2023, South Africa filed a complaint with the International Court of Justice (ICJ) against Israel for alleged violations of the 1948 Genocide Convention. In March 2024, Nicaragua filed a complaint against Germany with the ICJ, accusing it of aiding and abetting genocide in Gaza through arms deliveries to and political support for Israel.

At the same time, debates intensified in Germany regarding antisemitism, freedom of speech, and the limits of legitimate criticism of Israel. Critics of German remembrance policy, such as A. Dirk Moses, Jürgen Zimmerer, and Michael Rothberg, argued that since the 2000s, an increasingly dogmatic form of German remembrance culture had emerged, in which support for Israel had become an identity-forming component of German reason of state. Rothberg describes an increasingly "absolutist" German culture of remembrance that frequently rejected relational or postcolonial perspectives on the Holocaust and the Israel–Palestine conflict. Moses referred to this as the "German Catechism", which, among other things, enshrined the singularity and incomparability of the Holocaust and the equation of anti-Zionism with antisemitism. According to Moses, anti-antisemitism, the fight against antisemitism, was a central component of this catechism and had evolved into a "philosemitic identification with Israel" as part of German political life. In "The German Chauvinism," Bue Rübner explains that inherited German guilt was being overcome through ritualized expressions of moral righteousness focused on support for Israel, which were increasingly equated with anti-antisemitism. The German-Israeli publicist and director of the Anne Frank Institute, Meron Mendel, has criticized this identification and the invocation of reason of state in connection with the current Israeli leadership, describing it as particularly problematic given the Israeli government's "ultranationalist and religious-fundamentalist" orientation. He is also skeptical of Germany's much-discussed inclusion of Israel's security in the concept of reason of state, which, in his view, primarily benefited the German arms industry.

The Global Public Policy Institute (GPPi) describes the invocation of reason of state as promoting an artificial unquestionability of Israeli policy that undermined democratic discourse. Jannis Julien Grimm believes that the state-centered portrayal of historical responsibility toward Israel reinforced authoritarian tendencies and marginalized emancipatory Jewish perspectives, while distracting from current forms of antisemitism. In this context, reason of state is increasingly viewed as performative. Critics argue that the Federal Republic's fight against antisemitism consisted more of censorship and alignment with state narratives than of meaningful engagement with justice, pluralism, or anti-racism. According to them, this climate enabled punitive measures such as disinvitations, defunding, and denunciations of people and organisations critical of the Israeli government. Observers point to a pattern whereby voices that align with German and European notions of nationality are highlighted, to the detriment of more universal and cosmopolitan identities. In a 2025 article in the Israeli newspaper Haaretz, Nimrod Flaschenberg from the organisation "Israelis for Peace" criticized the "blind support for Israel" as part of the "reason of state" on the part of the German government.

In October 2025, Chancellor Friedrich Merz stated that reason of state did not mean unconditional support for every Israeli government. Furthermore, he noted that reason of state "generally applies to one's own country and not to others".

=== Censorship ===
Among other things, reason of state has been invoked in connection with the banning of pro-Palestinian protests and organizations critical of the Israeli government. A significant precedent was set in 2019 regarding the Boycott, Divestment, and Sanctions (BDS) movement, when the Bundestag passed a non-binding resolution classifying it as antisemitic. Although the resolution is not legally binding, it has been used to justify funding cuts, event cancellations, and the disinvitation of speakers at public institutions. These measures have raised concerns regarding civil liberties, academic freedom, and the restriction of democratic space in Germany, particularly when the Bundestag further institutionalized the IHRA definition of antisemitism in 2024, which was criticized for equating criticism of Israeli policy with antisemitism.

In German education, cultural, and academic policy as well, the invocation of reason of state was subject of controversial debate, and public discourse was restricted. Various educational and cultural programs, including the Jewish-Israeli art collective "The School for Unlearning Zionism", had their funding cut after being labelled as BDS-affiliated. Judith Butler, who received the Adorno Prize in 2012, faced public accusations of anti-Semitism due to her criticism of the Israeli state. Another controversy was sparked in 2012 by the poem "What Must Be Said" by the German writer and Nobel Prize laureate Günter Grass. In it, he accuses Israel of endangering world peace and criticizes the "general silence" surrounding this issue in German discourse. As a result, Die Welt described Grass as an "eternal anti-Semite." In 2020, the Federal Government's Commissioner for Anti-Semitism, Felix Klein, criticized the invitation of Achille Mbembe to the 2020 Ruhrtriennale and accused Mbembe of antisemitism due to his comparison of Israel to South Africa's apartheid system.

Numerous public controversies also involved disinvitations, funding cuts, or cancellations of events featuring Israeli, Jewish, or Palestinian intellectuals and artists, including Omri Boehm, Adania Shibli, and Masha Gessen. In December 2023, the Heinrich Böll Foundation and the City of Bremen withdrew their support for the awarding of the Hannah Arendt Prize to Gessen after she had criticized Israel's actions in the occupied Gaza Strip and compared them to the Warsaw Ghetto. In April 2024, the University of Cologne revoked its invitation to Nancy Fraser to serve as a visiting professor after she, too, had criticized the Israeli military's actions in the Gaza Strip and signed the open letter "Philosophy for Palestine" in November 2023. In 2025, a lecture by the UN Special Rapporteur on the occupied Palestinian territories, Francesca Albanese, at LMU Munich was cancelled due to anticipated controversy. In 2026, Foreign Minister Johann Wadephul called for her resignation as UN Special Rapporteur.

In May 2024, the Federal Ministry of Research, Technology and Space (BMBF) examined civil and criminal sanctions as well as the possibility of withdrawing BMBF funding from the signatories of an open letter calling for freedom of expression for "pro-Palestinian" students. In 2024, Anna Younes and Hanna Al-Taher argued that since 7 October 2023, German educational institutions had increasingly become places where the German reason of state regarding Israel was defended through administrative measures, disciplinary actions, and restrictions on pro-Palestinian positions. Jewish and Palestinian students, artists, and scholars describe a climate of fear and self-censorship. New legislation in Berlin proposed expelling students for political expression, further raising concerns about academic freedom in relation to Germany's support for Israel. Civil society organizations and Jewish intellectuals have issued open letters condemning what they describe as disproportionate and politically motivated responses that threaten basic civil rights.

Critics argue that these acts of censorship had restricted legitimate discourse on German-Israeli relations and Israeli policy.

== Trade ==
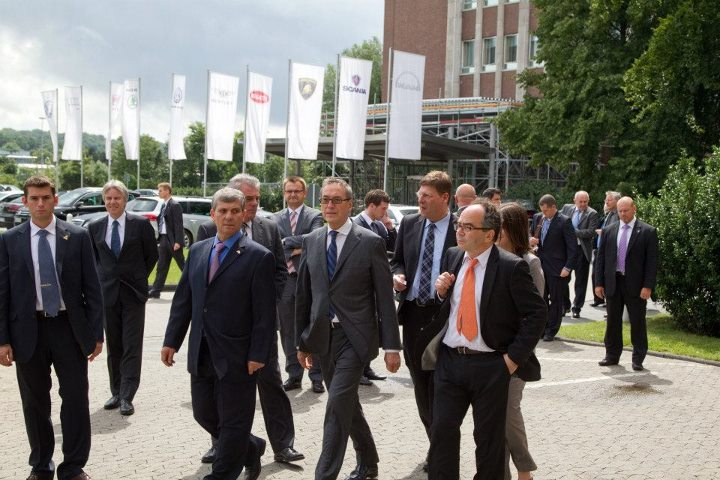
Israeli Minister of Commerce, Shalom Simhon, meeting with German officials

Germany is Israel's largest trading partner in Europe and Israel's second most important trading partner after the United States. Israeli imports from Germany amount to some USD 2.3 billion annually, while Israel is Germany's fourth largest trading partner in the North Africa/Middle East region.

Germany - Israel trade in millions USD-$
	Germany Exports Israel Imports	Israel Exports Germany Imports	Total Trade Value
2023	6515.8	2137.3	8653.1
2022	7075.7	1880.6	8956.3
2021	6560.4	1792.5	8352.9
2020	5230.2	1681.1	6911.3
2019	5582.7	1671.8	7254.5
2018	5420	1777.2	7197.2
2017	4721.8	1638.4	6360.2
2016	4069.6	1519.9	5589.5
2015	3808.3	1440.8	5249.1
2014	4652	1727.8	6379.8
2013	4667.7	1763.3	6431
2012	4621.8	1631.9	6253.7
2011	4566.5	1950	6516.5
2010	3678.8	1701.4	5380.2
2009	3361.8	1440.3	4802.1
2008	3940.5	1950.6	5891.1
2007	3484.3	1913	5397.3
2006	3201.4	1757.9	4959.3
2005	2986	1345.9	4331.9
2004	3090.2	1361	4451.2
2003	2731.1	1123.3	3854.4
2002	2347.8	1026.5	3374.3

== Tourism ==
Both Germany and Israel offer one another Visa Free or Electronic Travel Authorization (ETA) for their citizens to visit each other and for both the arrivals are considered as predominantly main group of tourist. Israel and Germany also offer each other's citizens Working Holiday Visas.

Tourism of Germans in Israel and Israelis in Germany (in thousands)
Origin of Visitors	2023	2022	2021	2020	2019	2018	2017	2016	2015	2014	2013	2012	2011	2010	2009	2008
Germany	167.4	151.1	16.5	50.3	289	262.6	218.1	164.1	159.8	162.3	159.8	158.5	171	171.5	139.8	137.4
Israel	234.4	241.7	72.2	45.2	291.2	314	316.1	323.6	311.4	280.6	255	237.8	203.5	187.8	155.1	141.9

== Culture, science, and social programs ==
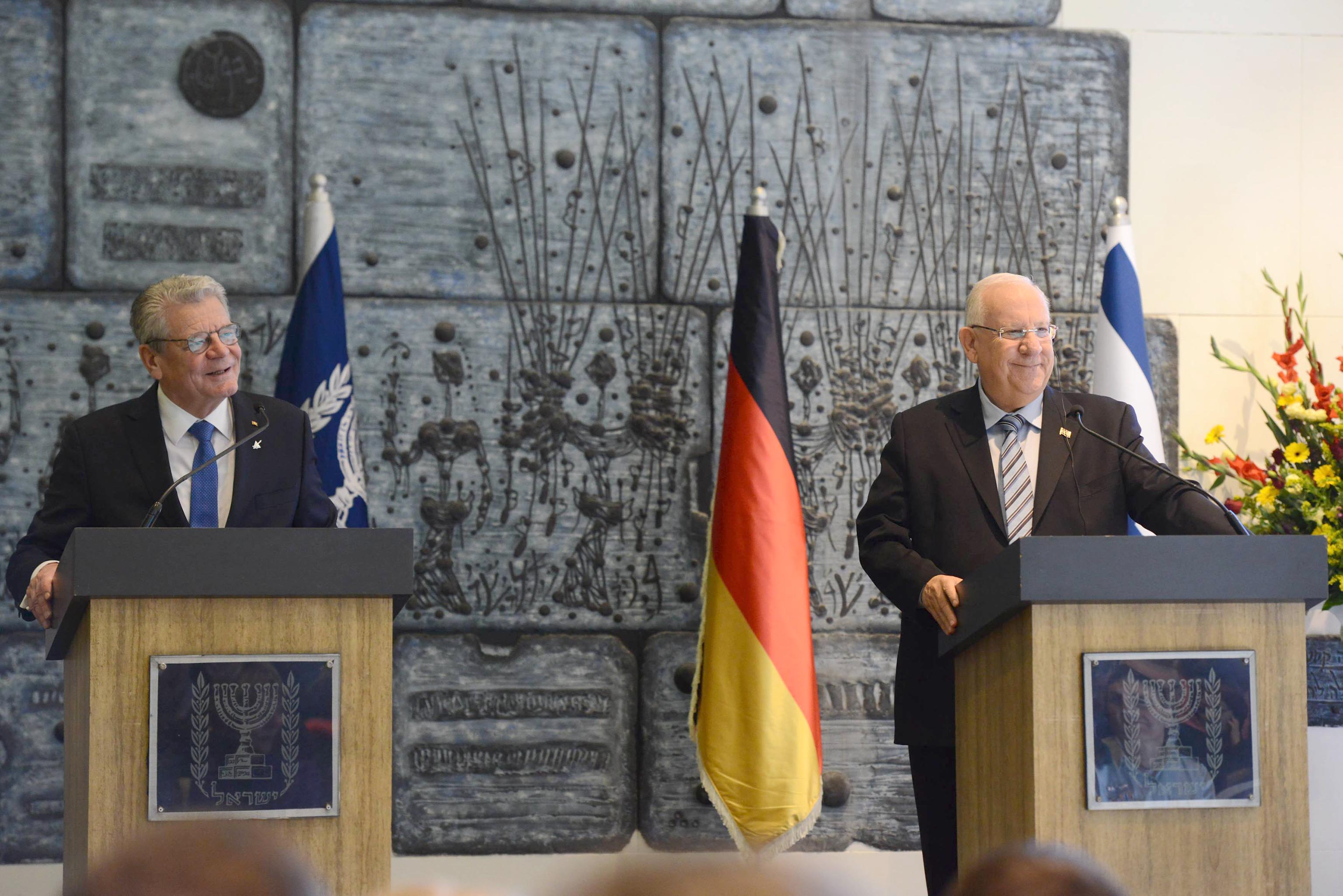
Joachim Gauck in a visit in Israel with Reuven Rivlin, December 2015

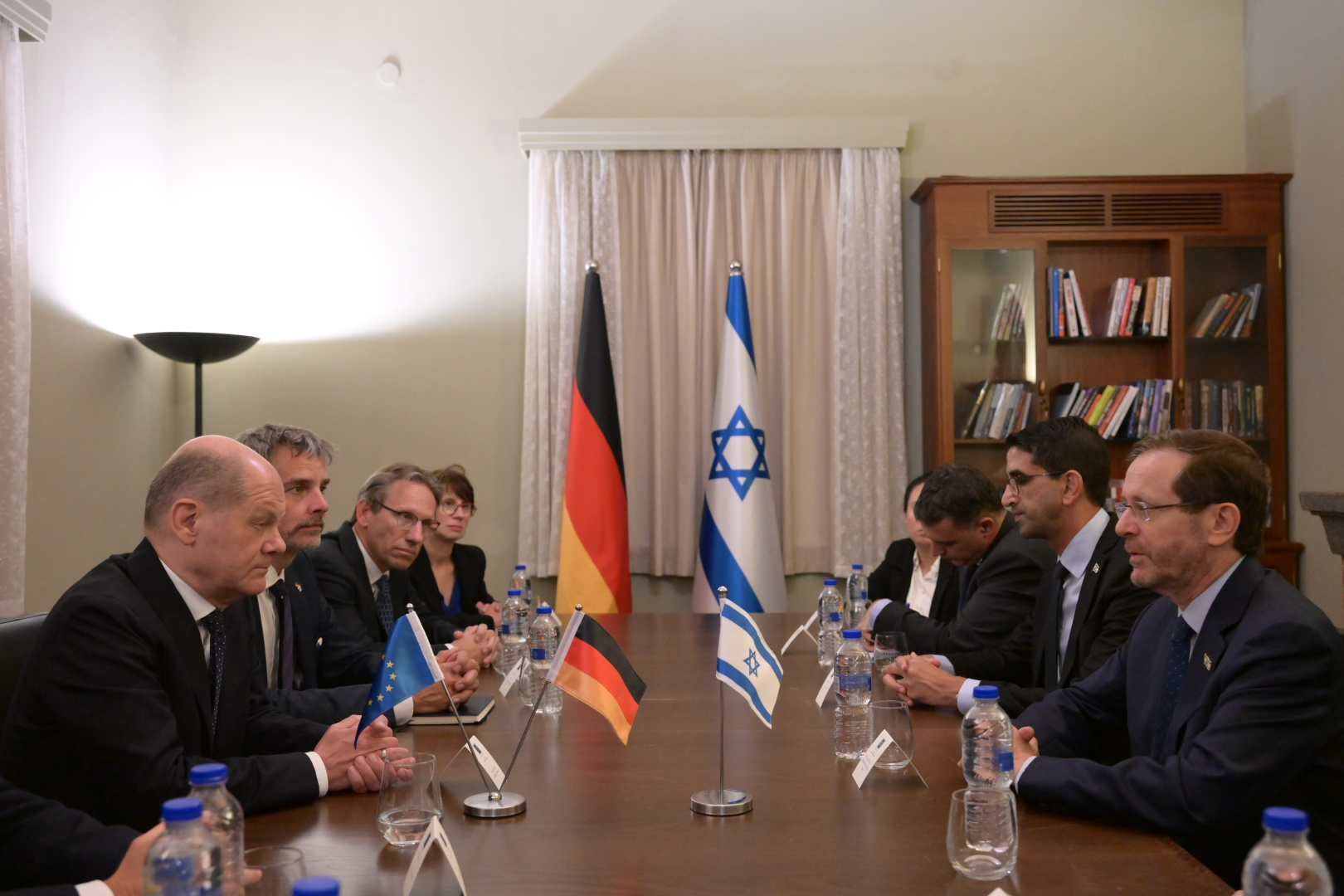
German Chancellor Olaf Scholz with Israeli President Isaac Herzog in Tel Aviv, Israel, 17 October 2023

The two countries enjoy extensive scientific relations, with cooperation in science between Israeli and German universities and the development of the Minerva Society. During the visit by President Katsav, Bundestag President Wolfgang Thierse promoted the establishment of German–Israeli Youth Office – modeled on Germany's joint youth offices with France and Poland – as a tool to educate German and Israeli youth about their respective histories and the sensitivities of their relationship. The German-Israel Foundation for Scientific Research and Development (GIF) was established in 1986.

A number of exchange programs work between young Germans and Israelis. About 2,000 Israelis and 4,500 Germans currently participate each year in the exchange program run by Germany's Federal Ministry for the Family, Senior Citizens, Women and Youth. The German organization Action Reconciliation (Aktion Sühnezeichen) has played a role in bringing Germans and Israelis together. Since 1961, Action Reconciliation has sent about 2,500 volunteers to work in Israeli hospitals and social welfare programs. Churches and trade unions have been active in fostering relations.

Israel places great importance on sister city relationships with German cities. Haifa has five sister cities in Germany; Tel Aviv has five and Netanya has two. Over 100 Israeli cities and local authorities have ties with Germany.

In October 2025, German Chancellor Friedrich Merz stated that Germany should boycott the 2026 Eurovision Song Contest if Israel were excluded.

== Military cooperation ==
Germany and Israel have significant and long-standing military cooperation. From 1959 to 1967 the Federal Republic of Germany was a significant supplier of military equipment and arms to Israel. However, after 1965, when West Germany backed out of an agreement to sell tanks to Israel, the United States filled the order by selling 210 M48 Patton tanks. The Merkava 4 uses a German MTU MB 873 Ka-501 air-cooled diesel V12 engine produced under license. Germany has supplied Israel with Dolphin class submarines while Germany utilizes the Israeli-designed Spike Anti-Tank Missile. In 2008, it was revealed that Germany and Israel had been jointly developing a nuclear warning system, dubbed Operation Bluebird, in secret.

The German-Israeli military cooperation was shrouded in secrecy for a long period, as such an entente was not seen favorably within Israel. However, this tight relationship, translated through arms deal and intelligence sharing, developed into solid trust and ultimately laid the necessary groundwork for the establishment of diplomatic ties. For the first time in history, German combat aircraft landed at Ovda Airport in Israel to take part in the Blue Flag exercise in 2017. Israel supplied Arrow 3 missiles to Germany during the Russo-Ukrainian War in 2023.

In October 2023, following the outbreak of the Gaza war, German Defense Minister Boris Pistorius expressed full support for Israel. He told Israeli Defence Minister Yoav Gallant that "whatever we can do to support you, with material support, we will do this." In 2023, Germany approved arms exports to Israel worth 326.5 million euros, or about $353.7 million. In 2025, German Chancellor Friedrich Mertz told WDR television that he no longer "understands" Israel's purpose in Gaza and that its actions can "no longer be justified by a fight against Hamas." By 8 August the same year, Germany had suspended the export of arms to Israel that could find use in the Gaza Strip, a decision that came after the latter's decision to take over Gaza. This was a major shift in Germany's policy towards Israel, given the "special relationship" between the two. On 17 November, following the 10 October ceasefire between Israel and Hamas, Meretz spokesman Sebastian Hille announced that these restrictions would be lifted on 24 November, and that exports of arms and military equipment to Israel would resume. On 18 December, the Israeli Ministry of Defence announced that the German government approved a $3.1 billion weapons deal with Israel, supplying Germany with Arrow 3 missile defence systems.

In January 2026, Germany and Israel signed an expanded cybersecurity and security cooperation agreement with the goal of strengthening digital defence against cyber threats and enhancing the protection of critical infrastructure. The declaration, signed by German Interior Minister Dobrindt and Israeli Prime Minister Netanyahu, includes plans for joint cyber defence coordination, cooperation on artificial intelligence applications, and enhanced collaboration on counter-terrorism and drone defence. At the same time, German officials indicated interest in adapting aspects of Israel's cyber defence experience to bolster Germany's national resilience against cyberattacks.

== Gaza War ==
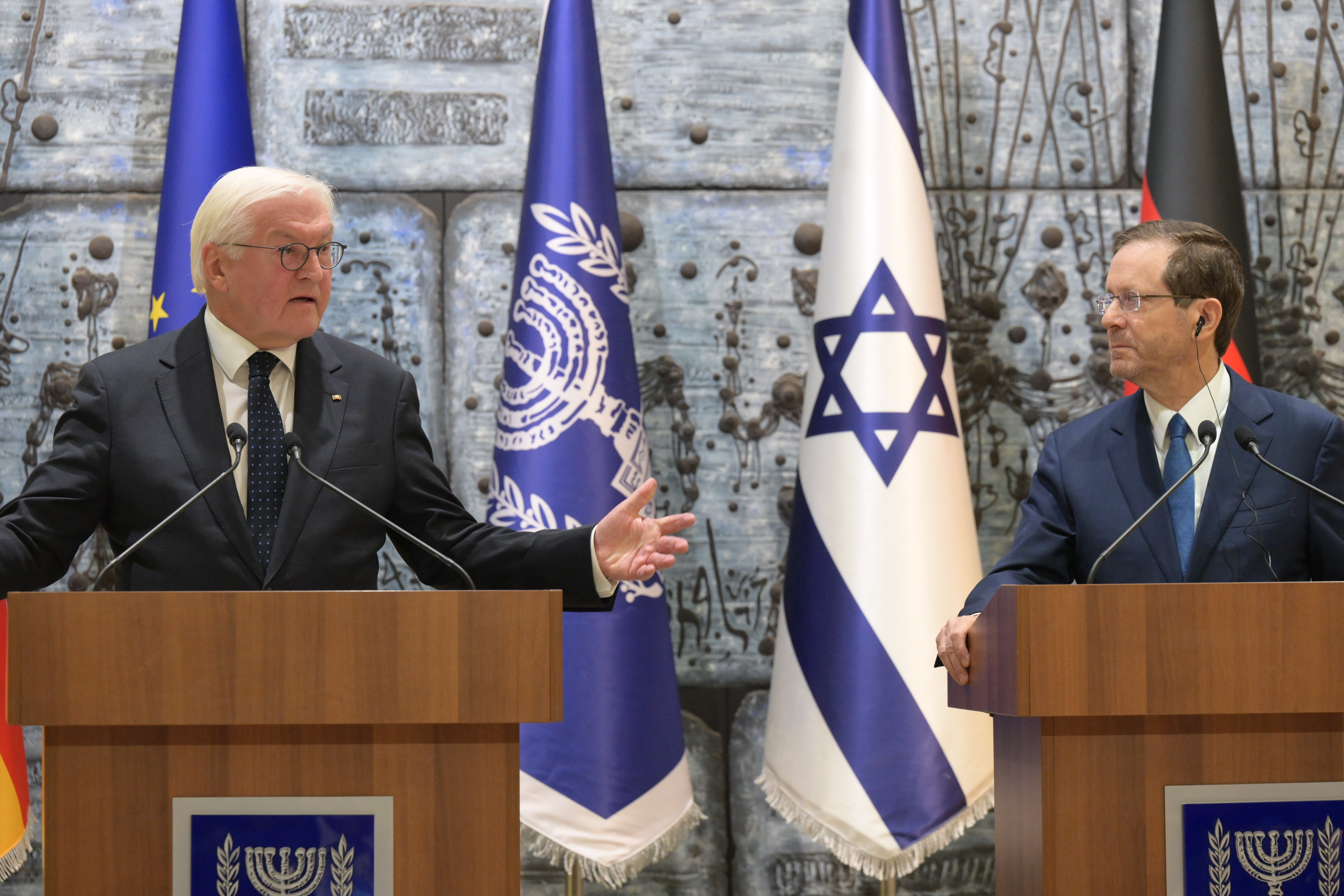
German President Frank-Walter Steinmeier and Israeli President Herzog in Jerusalem, 26 November 2023

German Chancellor Olaf Scholz condemned Hamas' actions during the Gaza war and expressed his support to Israel and its right to self-defense. He criticized the Palestinian Authority and Palestinian President Mahmoud Abbas, saying that "their silence is shameful." On 17 October 2023, Scholz arrived in Israel and on the same day warned Iran and Hezbollah not to get involved in the war between Israel and Hamas. He said that "Germany and Israel are united by the fact that they are democratic constitutional states. Our actions are based on law and order, even in extreme situations."

In January 2024, President Hage Geingob of Namibia called Israel's actions in Gaza "genocidal and gruesome" and sharply criticized Germany's decision to back Israel in South Africa v. Israel, saying that Germany had an "inability to draw lessons from its horrific history". In February 2024 lawyers representing Palestinians in Germany filed a criminal complaint against various senior politicians including Chancellor Olaf Scholz, foreign minister Annalena Baerbock, economic minister Robert Habeck, and finance minister Christian Lindner for "aiding and abetting" the genocide in Gaza. On 1 March 2024, Nicaragua initiated proceedings against Germany at the ICJ under the Genocide Convention, concerning Germany's support for Israel in the Gaza war.

At the start of the Gaza war in October 2023, Germany sold Israel weapons worth 326 million euros, which was not repeated in 2024 according to Israel's Shomrim Research Network. The German spokesman of the Ministry of Economy said that the government makes decisions on arms exports on a case-by-case basis, taking into account humanitarian law and the current situation between Israel and Hamas, the spokesman said. Between August and October 2024, Germany sold weapons worth 94 million euros to Israel. In October 2024, CDU leader Friedrich Merz successfully urged the German government to resume weapons deliveries to Israel, including spare parts for tanks.

In 2024, Amnesty International accused the German government of "taking a one-sided stance in favor of Israel throughout the entire conflict" in the Middle East, claiming that while the German government criticizes Hamas' war crimes, the government does not name Israel's actions that violate international law as such.

Francesca Albanese, incumbent UN Special Rapporteur on the occupied Palestinian territories, criticised foreign minister Annalena Baerbock following a speech by the Foreign Minister in the German Bundestag on 7 October 2024, in which Baerbock alluded to Israeli attacks on Palestinian civilian sites as "self-defense" and said that "that's what Germany stands for" to much applause.

CDU leader Friedrich Merz criticized the International Criminal Court's decision to issue an arrest warrant for Israeli Prime Minister Benjamin Netanyahu for alleged war crimes during the Gaza war. In February 2025, one day after the 2025 German federal election, he announced his intention to invite Netanyahu to Germany, "as an open challenge" to the decision of the ICC.

On 8 August 2025, after the Israeli security cabinet's decision to take over the Gaza Strip, Merz announced Germany's decision to suspend the export of arms to Israel that could be used there. He said that Germany would no longer approve the export to Israel of weapons "that could be used in the Gaza Strip until further notice." In November 2025, the German government ended a partial suspension of arms deliveries to Israel for use in Gaza. In early December 2025, German Chancellor Friedrich Merz visited Israel and met with Prime Minister Benjamin Netanyahu and President Isaac Herzog. The discussions focused on solidifying German support for Israel, the ongoing Gaza conflict, the peace process, and a major arms deal.

In July 2026, German Foreign Minister Johann Wadephul reaffirmed his government's longstanding opposition to Israeli settlements in the West Bank, describing them as illegal under international law. However, he stopped short of endorsing proposals by some EU partners to ban or restrict imports from these settlements, emphasising instead the need to maintain open channels of dialogue with Israel. At the same time, Wadephul urged accelerated efforts to improve humanitarian access to Gaza and called for the gradual dismantling of Hamas's military and administrative capabilities.

== Public opinion ==
According to a poll by the German Forsa Institute on behalf of the newspaper Die Welt conducted in December 2023, 45% of respondents in Germany agreed and 43% disagreed with the statement: "Israel's military action in the Gaza Strip is all in all appropriate." In the immediate aftermath of the Hamas attack on Israel, 44% of Germans said Germany has "a special obligation towards Israel." In December 2023, that number dropped to 37%.

According to a 2025 Pew Research Center survey, 31% of people in Germany had a favorable view of Israel, while 64% had an unfavorable view; 21% had confidence in Israeli Prime Minister Benjamin Netanyahu, while 76% did not.

== See also ==
- International recognition of Israel
- History of the Jews in Germany
- haGalil, an online magazine for German-speaking Jews
- Anti-German sentiment in Israel
- Antisemitism in 21st-century Germany
- Germany and Israel: Whitewashing and Statebuilding, a 2020 book by Daniel Marwecki
