= Office of Program Policy Analysis and Government Accountability =

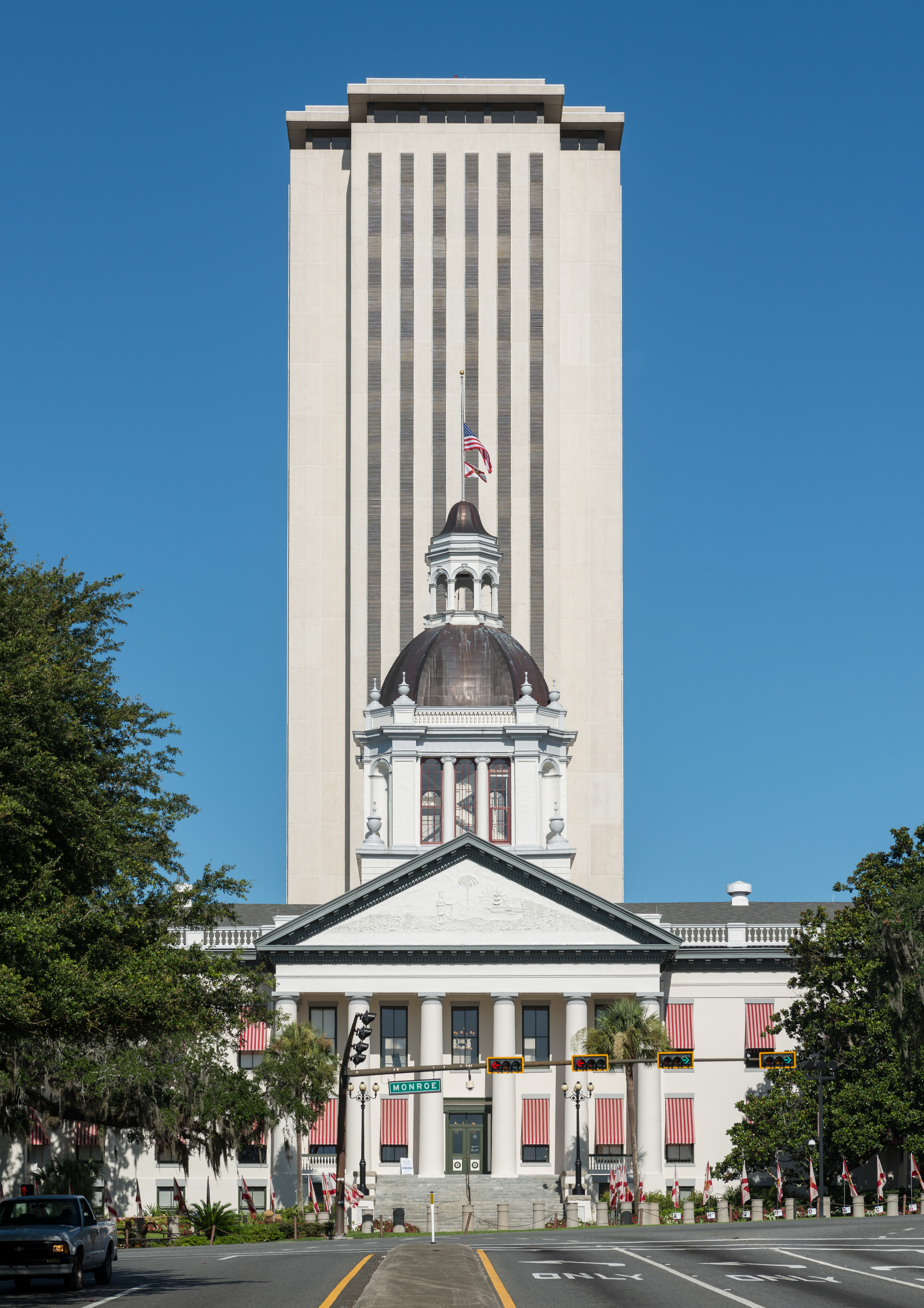

Agency overview
- Formed: July 1, 1994
- Headquarters: 111 West Madison Street, Suite 312 Tallahassee, Florida 32399-1475
- Agency executive: Kara Collins-Gomez, Coordinator
- Website: www.oppaga.state.fl.us

The Office of Program Policy Analysis and Government Accountability (OPPAGA) is the research arm of the Florida Legislature. OPPAGA supports the Florida Legislature by providing data, evaluative research, and objective analyses to support legislative budget and policy deliberations. State law (substantive legislation or budget proviso), legislative leadership (Senate President and Speaker of the House), and the Joint Legislative Auditing Committee determine OPPAGA's research. OPPAGA operates under the guidance of a coordinator who is selected by the presiding officers.

== History ==
In 1994, the Florida Legislature removed the program evaluation unit from the Florida Auditor General and created OPPAGA to help improve the performance and accountability of state government. Since then, OPPAGA has provided research services to the Legislature, including producing over 1,300 published reports.

== Services ==
OPPAGA provides a variety of research services to the Legislature, including the following.

- Reports, which evaluate a variety of state agencies and programs and analyze specific policy issues to assess the impact of a potential program or policy.
- Government Program Summaries (GPS), which is an encyclopedia of more than 33 Florida state government agencies and programs. GPS provides a basic agency description, includes the latest agency funding information, references other sources of agency information, and contains agency contact information and links to other sites that may be of interest.
- Policy Notes, which is an email newsletter highlighting OPPAGA publications and other reports from the Legislature, state and federal government reports, think tank research, website resources, and other sources for policy research and program evaluation.
- Contract Management, which entails overseeing outsourced projects as directed by the presiding officers, state law, and budget proviso. Such projects include a range of topics, from statewide to agency-specific to local government programs and issues.

At the direction of the Legislature, OPPAGA may research all aspects of state government, conducting the work through four policy areas – Criminal and Civil Justice; Education; Government Operations; and Health and Human Services. A staff director manages each policy area. The following list provides examples of recent published reports completed by each policy area.

- Criminal and Civil Justice:
  - Pretrial Release – Annual study of the effectiveness and cost efficiency of pretrial release programs in Florida. This report gathers information pertaining to program funding; the nature of criminal convictions of participating defendants; the number of failed court appearances by participating defendants; the number of warrants issued subsequently by defendants in each program; and pretrial program compliance with statutory reporting requirements.
  - Multidisciplinary Legal Representation – Annual study of multidisciplinary legal representation provided by the Offices of Criminal Conflict and Civil Regional Counsel to parents of children in the child welfare system. This report provides an annual update on the implementation of the approach as well as an outcomes analysis.
  - Exhaust System Noise – Review of exhaust system noise regulation that includes a discussion of sound and sound measurement; a literature review of the effect of excessive noise on health and quality of life; an examination of federal, state, and local exhaust noise regulations, including citations issued under state law; and potential options to further address exhaust system noise.
- Education:
  - Career Statewide Articulation Agreements – Review of career statewide articulation agreements pertaining to industry certifications, career certificate programs, and applied technology diploma programs that articulate to associate in applied science or associate in science degrees; early childhood education programs; and associate in science to baccalaureate degree programs.
  - Charter School Funding – Assessment of current methods used to distribute capital outlay funds and specified federal program funds to traditional public schools and charter schools. The report provides detailed information on capital outlay funding available to school districts and the current methodology used to distribute these funds to public schools as well as detailed information on specific federal program funding available to school districts and the current methodologies used to distribute these funds to public schools.
  - Lottery – Annual study of the funding and operations of the Department of the Lottery, which generates revenue via draw and scratch off games to support public schools and Bright Future Scholarships. The report also explores options to enhance the department’s earning capability and improve its efficiency.
- Government Operations:
  - Affordable Housing – Quinquennial study of affordable housing policies enacted by local governments, assessing the policies’ effectiveness and identifying which policies constitute best practices for replication statewide. The review also examines the extent to which interlocal cooperation is used to implement affordable housing policies.
  - Economic Development Programs – Annual study of state economic development incentive programs on a three-year recurring schedule. The study evaluates each program’s effectiveness and value to the state’s taxpayers over the previous three years and includes recommendations for consideration by the Legislature.
  - Florida Healthy Food – Review of the Department of Agriculture and Consumer Services’ Healthy Food Financing Initiative, which the Legislature created to provide financial assistance for the rehabilitation or expansion of grocery retail outlets located in certain parts of the state. The review assessed food access, economic vitality, and value to communities.
- Health and Human Services:
  - Commercial Sexual Exploitation of Minors – Annual study of human trafficking of minors in Florida. This review reports on the number of children that the Department of Children and Families identified and tracked as victims of commercial sexual exploitation; describes specialized services provided to victims; and presents short- and long-term outcomes.
  - Medicaid Fraud and Abuse – Biennial study of the Agency for Health Care Administration’s efforts to prevent, detect, deter, and recover funds lost to fraud and abuse in the Medicaid program.
  - Graduate Medical Education – Review of how funding changes and other state programmatic factors over the past 10 years have affected graduate medical education residency placements and physician retention in Florida. The report also made recommendations for increasing the retention of medical doctors in the state.

== Presentations ==
Legislative committees may invite OPPAGA to present its research findings during public meetings. The following list provides examples of recent presentations from each policy area.

- Affordable Housing to the Senate Committee on Community Affairs (January 2025)
- Annual Report on the Commercial Sexual Exploitation of Children in Florida, 2024 to the Senate Committee on Children, Families, and Elder Affairs (February 2025)
- OPPAGA Research on School Start Times to the House Choice and Innovation Subcommittee (February 2023)
- Restorative Justice to the Senate Appropriations Subcommittee on Criminal and Civil Justice (February 2021)

== Similar agencies ==
The federal Government Accountability Office (GAO) is the audit, evaluation, and investigative arm of the United States Congress.

At the state level, there are offices similar to OPPAGA, but the organizational placement of these offices varies by state. For example, like Florida, some states have evaluation offices that operate as separate legislative units. Almost half of the states have evaluation offices that are part of the legislative auditor’s office, while only a few states have evaluation offices within a legislative oversight or other committee. These organizations include the following.

- Hawaii State Auditor
- Maine Office of Program Evaluation and Government Accountability
- Minnesota Office of the Legislative Auditor
- Mississippi Joint Committee on Performance Evaluation and Expenditure Review
- South Carolina Legislative Audit Council
- Texas Sunset Advisory Commission
- Virginia Joint Legislative Audit and Review Commission
- Washington Joint Legislative Audit and Review Committee
- Wisconsin Legislative Audit Bureau

State legislative evaluation offices network through the National Legislative Program Evaluation Society to share ideas for improving government operations.
