= Gary Ruskin =

American consumer advocate

Gary Ruskin is an American consumer advocate. He is the executive director of the nonprofit U.S. Right to Know. He is the former director of the watchdog Congressional Accountability Project.

Ruskin has a BA in religion from Carleton College and an MA in public policy from the John F. Kennedy School of Government at Harvard University.
