= Whitewash (book) =

Book by Carey Gillam

- Author: Carey Gillam
- Language: English
- Subject: Monsanto, Glyphosate, Agrochemicals
- Genre: Non-fiction
- Published: 2017, Island Press
- Publication place: United States
- Media type: Print, e-book
- Pages: 272 pages
- ISBN: 978-1-61091-832-9
- OCLC: 1008984426
- Website: islandpress.org/book/whitewash

Whitewash: The Story of a Weed Killer, Cancer, and the Corruption of Science is a 2017 non-fiction book by American investigative journalist, and former senior Reuters correspondent, Carey Gillam. It was published October 10, 2017 by Island Press, a nonprofit, environmental publisher. Whitewash details how corporate interests influence the science behind American agriculture, allowing the potentially cancer-causing Monsanto herbicide glyphosate to be used liberally throughout the industry. The book contains accounts from farm families with cancers they believe were caused by glyphosate, and scientists whose reputations were impugned for publishing writings that challenged "business interests". Whitewash won the 2018 Rachel Carson Book Award from the Society of Environmental Journalists as well as "Outstanding Book of the Year" from the Independent Publisher Book Awards 2018. It has been translated into Dutch and into Chinese for publication in Taiwan.
