= Yeshayahu Jelínek =

Slovak-Israeli historian

Yeshayahu Andrej Jelínek (Hebrew: ישעיהו ילינק; 1933-2016) was a Slovak-Israeli historian. His work focused on the Holocaust and related topics, with a particular focus on Slovakia. He was born in Prievidza. During World War II he and his family hid from the Nazis. In 1949 he and his brother emigrated to Israel with Hashomer Hatzair, moving to the kibbutz Ma'anit.

Jelínek studied history at the Hebrew University and Indiana University, where he received a doctorate in 1966. He taught at Ben-Gurion University of the Negev.

He married his wife Mirjam in 1977. They had three children.
