= German Zone of Protection in Slovakia =

World War II Nazi-controlled zone

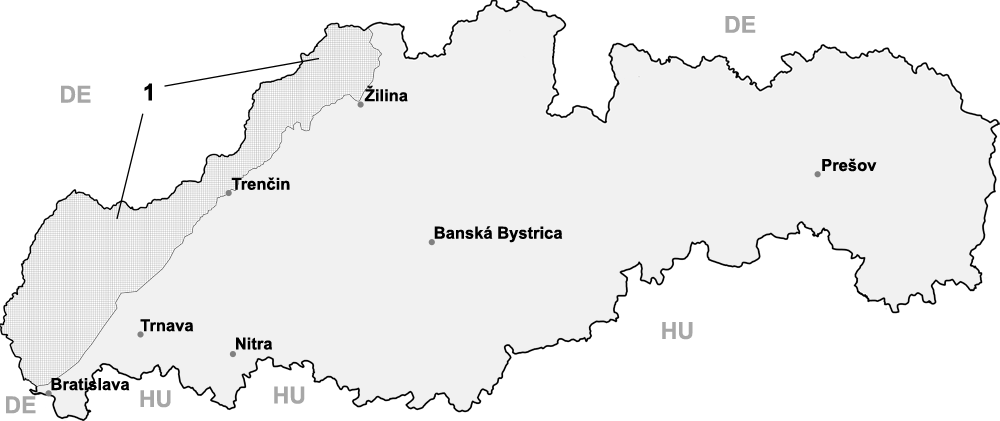
1. The zone of protection

The German Zone of Protection in Slovakia, or the Protective Zone (German: Schutzzone) was an area established in the western parts of the First Slovak Republic after the dissolution and division of Czechoslovakia by Nazi Germany during 1939. The special status of the zone was already created in the initial German-Slovak treaty of 23 March 1939, which defined the protective relationship between Germany and the Slovak State. The zone was codified by the German-Slovak treaty of August 28, 1939, which was signed in Bratislava (German: Pressburg).

The treaty gave the German Wehrmacht sole economic and political authority in the designated area in the form of a military occupation, which was demarcated by the ridges of the Little and White Carpathians and the Javorníky Mountains. The zone had the purpose of securing Germany the right to invade Poland from Slovak territory.

The Germans however kept the control over the Schutzzone throughout the whole war, because several weapon factories and important ex-Czechoslovak depots of arms were placed here.

== Online resources ==
- Original agreement (in German) http://wwii.germandocsinrussia.org/de/nodes/2158-akte-20-schutzzonenvertrag-zwischen-deutschland-und-slowakei-vom-12-august-1939-vereinbarung#page/3/mode/inspect/zoom/7
