= Lena Meyer-Landrut discography =

Lena discography
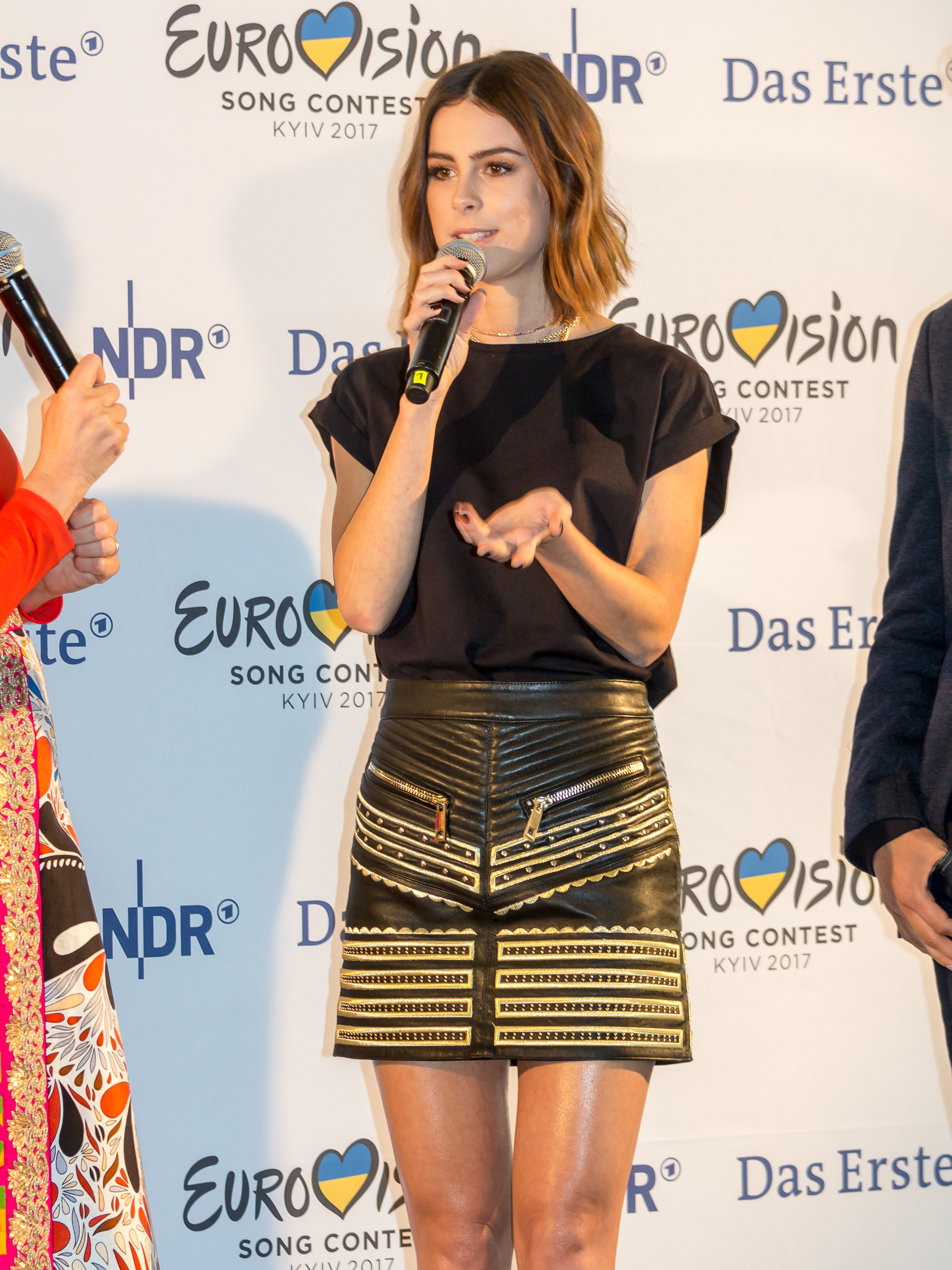
- Meyer-Landrut at the Unser Song 2017 press conference
- Studio albums: 6
- Extended plays: 3
- Singles: 19
- Video albums: 1
- Music videos: 19

The discography of German singer Lena Meyer-Landrut consists of five studio albums, three extended plays, nineteen singles, three promotional singles, one video album and nineteen music videos.

Lena Meyer-Landrut began her recording career in 2010, after winning Unser Star für Oslo (Our Star for Oslo), a television programme to select the German entry for the Eurovision Song Contest. With her three entries from the German national final ("Bee", "Satellite" and "Love Me"), she set an all-time record in Germany by debuting with three songs in the top five of the singles chart. "Satellite" debuted at number one in Germany and was certified double platinum. Following its victory at the Eurovision Song Contest 2010, "Satellite" reached the top spot in Denmark, Finland, Norway, Sweden, Switzerland and the European Hot 100. In May 2010, Meyer-Landrut released her debut studio album, My Cassette Player, which debuted at number one on the albums chart in Germany and Austria, and number three in Switzerland. The album was certified five times gold in Germany for shipments of 500,000 copies. The second official single from the album, "Touch a New Day", debuted and peaked at number thirteen in Germany and number twenty-six in Austria.

Her second album, Good News, was released on 8 February 2011 and debuted at number one on the German album charts. The song "Taken by a Stranger" won Unser Song für Deutschland on 18 February 2011 and was released as the album's lead single on 22 February 2011. Her third album, Stardust, was released on 12 October 2012. It debuted at number 2 in Germany was certified gold. It was preceded by the single "Stardust" which was released on 21 September 2012. It debuted at number 2 in Germany and was certified gold. Her fourth album, Crystal Sky, was released on 15 May 2015. It was preceded by the single "Traffic Lights", which was released on 1 May 2015. Her fifth album Only Love, L was released on 5 April 2019 and was preceded by the singles "Thank You" and "Don't Lie to Me". Her sixth album Loyal to Myself was released on 31 May 2024. It was preceded by the singles "Strip", "Looking for Love", "What I Want", "Straitjacket" and "Loyal to Myself".

== Albums ==
=== Studio albums ===
Title	Details	Peak chart positions									Certifications
Title	Details	GER	AUT	BEL (FL)	DEN	FIN	GRE	NOR	SWE	SWI	Certifications
My Cassette Player	Released: 7 May 2010; Label: USFO, Universal Music; Format: Digital download, CD	1	1	54	40	43	4	7	5	3	BVMI: 5× Gold
Good News	Released: 8 February 2011; Label: USFO, Universal Music; Format: Digital download, CD	1	7	—	—	—	—	—	—	15	BVMI: Platinum
Stardust	Released: 12 October 2012; Label: Universal Music; Format: Digital download, CD, vinyl	2	14	—	—	—	—	—	—	31	BVMI: Gold
Crystal Sky	Released: 15 May 2015; Label: Universal Music; Format: Digital download, CD, vinyl	2	25	—	—	—	—	—	—	40	BVMI: Gold
Only Love, L	Released: 5 April 2019; Label: Universal Music; Format: Digital download, CD, vinyl	2	4	—	—	—	—	—	—	14	
Loyal to Myself	Released: 31 May 2024; Label: Universal Music; Format: Digital download, CD, vinyl	5	7	—	—	—	—	—	—	78	
"—" denotes a recording that did not chart or were not released.

=== Extended plays ===
Title	Extended play details
Optimistic	Released: May 21, 2021; Label: Universal Music; Format: DI
Kind	Released: May 25, 2021; Label: Universal Music; Format: DI
Confident	Released: May 28, 2021; Label: Universal Music; Format: DI

== Singles ==
=== As lead artist ===
Title	Year	Peak chart positions											Certifications	Album
Title	Year	GER	AUS	AUT	BEL (FL)	DEN	FIN	NLD	NOR	SWE	SWI	UK	Certifications	Album
"Satellite"	2010	1	37	2	4	1	1	5	1	1	1	30	BVMI: 2× Platinum; GLF: Gold; IFPI DEN: Gold; IFPI SWI: Platinum	My Cassette Player
"Touch a New Day"	2010	13	—	26	—	—	—	—	—	—	—	—		My Cassette Player
"Taken by a Stranger"	2011	2	—	18	— (Note: Did not appear on the official Belgian Ultratop 50 chart, but rather on Ultratip chart, which combines "Airplay and Sales".)	—	—	92	—	—	29	117		Good News
"What a Man"	2011	21	—	—	—	—	—	—	—	—	—	—		Good News
"Stardust"	2012	2	—	14	—	—	—	—	—	—	74	—	BVMI: Gold	Stardust
"Neon (Lonely People)"	2013	38	—	—	—	—	—	—	—	—	—	—		Stardust
"Mr. Arrow Key"	2013	46	—	—	—	—	—	—	—	—	—	—		Stardust
"Traffic Lights"	2015	14	—	48	— (Note: Did not appear on the official Belgian Ultratop 50 chart, but rather on Ultratip chart, which combines "Airplay and Sales".)	—	—	—	—	—	—	—	BVMI: Gold	Crystal Sky
"Wild & Free"	2015	8	—	21	—	—	—	—	—	—	37	—	BVMI: Gold	Crystal Sky
"Beat to My Melody"	2016	—	—	—	—	—	—	—	—	—	—	—		Crystal Sky
"Lost in You"	2017	58	—	72	—	—	—	—	—	—	—	—		Non-album singles
"If I Wasn't Your Daughter"	2017	35	—	54	—	—	—	—	—	—	31	—		Non-album singles
"Sólo Contigo" (with Topic and Juan Magán)	2018	—	—	—	—	—	—	—	—	—	—	—		Non-album singles
"Thank You"	2018	40	—	50	—	—	—	—	—	—	—	—	BVMI: Gold	Only Love, L
"Don't Lie to Me"	2019	30	—	39	—	—	—	—	—	—	—	—	BVMI: Gold	Only Love, L
"Sex in the Morning" (with Ramz)	2019	—	—	—	—	—	—	—	—	—	—	—		Only Love, L
"Better" (with Nico Santos)	2019	15	—	17	—	—	—	—	—	—	89	—	BVMI: Platinum; IFPI AUT: Gold	Only Love, L
"Strip"	2021	70	—	—	—	—	—	—	—	—	—	—		Loyal to Myself
"Looking for Love"	2022	— (Note: Did not appear on the official German Singles Chart, but peaked at number one on the German Airplay Chart.)	—	—	—	—	—	—	—	—	—	—		Loyal to Myself
"Life Was a Beach" (featuring Chris Hart)	2022	—	—	—	—	—	—	—	—	—	—	—		Non-album single
"What I Want"	2023	— (Note: Did not appear on the official German Singles Chart, but peaked at number one on the German Airplay Chart.)	—	—	—	—	—	—	—	—	—	—		Loyal to Myself
"Straitjacket"	2023	— (Note: Did not appear on the official German Singles Chart, but peaked at number 25 on the German Airplay Chart.)	—	—	—	—	—	—	—	—	—	—		Loyal to Myself
"Loyal to Myself"	2024	— (Note: Did not appear on the official German Singles Chart, but peaked at number 25 on the German Airplay Chart.)	—	—	—	—	—	—	—	—	—	—		Loyal to Myself
"—" denotes a recording that did not chart or were not released.

=== Promotional singles ===
Title	Year	Peak chart positions			Album
Title	Year	GER	AUT	SWI	Album
"Bee"	2010	3	26	27	My Cassette Player
"Love Me"	2010	4	28	39	My Cassette Player
"Boundaries"	2019	—	—	—	Only Love, L
"—" denotes a recording that did not chart or were not released.

=== As featured artist ===
Title	Year	Peak chart positions	Album
Title	Year	GER	Album
"Satellite (Rockabilly Version)" (Stefan Raab feat. Lena)	2011	24	Grand Prix Clubhits
"Revolution" (Dicks on Fire feat. Lena)	2013	63	Hits Total
"Just You and I (Live Session)" (Tom Walker feat. Lena)	2019	-	Non-album single

=== Other charted songs ===
Title	Year	Peak chart positions	Album
Title	Year	GER	Album
"Push Forward"	2011	15	Good News
"Maybe"	2011	53	Good News
"A Million And One"	2011	55	Good News
"Mama Told Me"	2011	58	Good News
"Time"	2012	52	Stardust (Single)

== Other appearances ==
List of non-single songs by Lena Meyer-Landrut from non-Lena Meyer-Landrut releases, showing year released and album name
Title	Year	Album
"A Whole New World" (Lena feat. Richard)	2014	I Love Disney
"Schlaft Alle"	2014	Giraffenaffen 3
"Regenbogen" (Lena & Mark Forster)	2016	Trolls: Original Motion Picture Soundtrack
"Natalie" "Durch Die Nacht" "Du Liebst Mich Nicht" "Mama" "Superior" "Break Free"	2017	Sing meinen Song – Das Tauschkonzert Volume 4
"All I Want for Christmas Is You" "Carol of the Bells" "Don't Give Up" (Michael Patrick Kelly feat. Lena)	2017	Sing Meinen Song - Das Weihnachtskonzert Volume 4

== Videos ==
=== Video albums ===
Title	Details	Notes
Good News Live	Released: 9 May 2011; Label: USFO, Universal Music; Format: Digital download, DVD	DVD recorded live on 15 April 2011 at Festhalle Frankfurt am Main

=== Music videos ===
Title	Year	Director	Notes
"Satellite"	2010	Frank Paul Husmann and Manfred Winkens	Simplistic video, shot during the night of the German national final.
"Touch a New Day"	2010	Marten Persiel	
"Taken By A Stranger"	2011	Wolf Gresenz	
"What A Man"	2011	Wolf Gresenz	Theme to the German movie What a Man, and features its lead actor Matthias Schweighöfer.
"Stardust"	2012	Bode Brodmüller	
"Neon (Lonely People)"	2013	Bode Brodmüller	
"Mr. Arrow Key"	2013	Sandra Ludewig	Concert impressions compiled by photographer Sandra Ludewig.
"Revolution"	2013		Lena in a commercial video for Doosh.
"Traffic Lights"	2015	Julian Ticona Cuba and Daniel Bartels	Lena runs through floors with moving walls and ends up with a dance routine.
"Wild & Free"	2015	Vi-Dan Tran	Lena and Elyas M'Barek jumping through the air and diving underwater, interrupted by scenes from the film Fack ju Goehte 2.
"Catapult"	2015	Vi-Dan Tran & Shawn Bu	Featuring Kat Vinter and Little Simz, released exclusively on the Crystal Sky DVD set and now available on YouTube.
"Home"	2015	Vi-Dan Tran & Shawn Bu	Released exclusively on the Crystal Sky DVD set and now available on YouTube.
"If I Wasn't Your Daughter"	2017	Vi-Dan Tran	
"Thank You"	2018	Mario Clement	
"Don't Lie to Me"	2019	Paul Ripke	
"Boundaries"	2019	Björn Dunne	
"Love"	2019	Henrik Alm	
"Better"	2019	Plug	
"Skinny Bitch"	2020	Paul Hüttemann	
"Strip"	2021	Stini Roehrs	
"Looking for Love"	2022	Maximilian Pauly	
