= Crystal Sky =

Studio album by Lena
- Released: 15 May 2015
- Recorded: 2014–15
- Studio: Hamburg; London; Brighton; New York City
- Length: 51:28
- Label: We Love Music; Universal
- Producer: Biffco; Beatgees

Lena chronology
Stardust (2012)	Crystal Sky (2015)	Only Love, L (2019)

Singles from Crystal Sky
- 1. "Traffic Lights" Released: 1 May 2015; 2. "Wild & Free" Released: 11 September 2015; 3. "Beat to My Melody" Released: 25 March 2016; 4. "Home" Released: 3 June 2017

Crystal Sky is the fourth studio album by German singer Lena Meyer-Landrut. It was released by We Love Music and Universal Music on 15 May 2015. Taking her work further into the electro pop genre, Meyer-Landrut worked with a variety of new collaborators on the album, including production teams Biffco and Beatgees, who would contribute a more electronic, bass-heavy, experimental and danceable sound to the album, along with club sounds, dubstep elements and computer-generated retro effects.

The album earned largely polarized reviews from music critics, some of whom felt it lacked variety and individuality, while others complimented Crystal Sky for its international sound and compared it favorably to English singer Ellie Goulding. In Germany, the album debuted at number two on the German Albums Chart and was eventually certified Gold by the Bundesverband Musikindustrie (BVMI) in 2023. Lead single "Traffic Lights" became a top 20 in Germany, while "Wild & Free," recorded for the comedy film Fack ju Göhte 2 (2015) and included on the deluxe edition of Crystal Sky became Meyer-Landrut's sixth top ten hit.

== Background ==
In early 2014, Meyer-Landrut began principal work on her fourth studio album. In January, she traveled to New York City to engage in talks with record producer Bosko. In May 2014, she visited the Yoad Nevo studios in London and in June 2014. she worked with Australian singer-songwriter Kat Vinter in Berlin and with Israeli-American singer-songwriter Rosi Golan in Los Angeles. In Brighton, she worked with the Biffco producer team. Further she worked with AFSHeeN and Berlin production team Beatgees who already produced a remix of "Neon (Lonely People)" and the children's song "Schlaft alle" for the compilation album Giraffenaffen 3 which was released in November 2014. On 7 August 2014, Meyer-Landrut revealed via her Twitter account that the title of the album would be Crystal Sky.

== Release and promotion ==
"Traffic Lights" was released as the lead single ahead of the album on 1 May 2015. The song entered the German singles chart at #14. The album followed two weeks later on CD, digital and limited CD+DVD version featuring music videos.

The next single "Wild & Free was released in September and served as the title track of the German comedy film Fack ju Göhte 2 (2015). It was later included on the deluxe CD+DVD version of the album released on 23 October 23, 2015.

"Beat to My Melody" was released as the third and final single from the album. A Remix EP was released on 8 April 2016 via Universal Music.

== Critical reception ==
Professional ratings
Review scores
Source	Rating
CDStarts.de	5/10
HNA	4/5 stars
Laut.de	3/5 stars
Rolling Stone	2.5/5 stars

Crystal Sky was released to generally polarizing reviews from music critics. MusikWoche editor Dietmar Schwenger called it "an exciting, contemporary album. The 14 new songs don't rely on catchy tunes and sure-fire airplay, but rather on intricate electronic landscapes and abstract beats, which often only unfold their magic on the second listen." WDR 2 critic Oliver Rustemeyer remarked that "for its diverse influences from home and abroad, Crystal Sky is extremely homogeneous. Opulent and powerful sounds collide with wide synth pads. Effects, alienation and other technical gadgets remain so subtle that the 14 numbers still pass as danceable pop. However, common mainstream structures are being broken down." hr3 summed the album as "an electronically inspired pop glitter that offers a lot of artfully composed music." HNA's Johanna Daher called it a "well-made album."

Münchner Merkur critic Marco Mach found that with Crystal Sky, Meyer-Landrut "reinvents herself and presents a courageous electronic and danceable glittering work [...] This is a new Lena who is sure to scare away old fans and win fewer new ones. Who sounds a little too much like Ellie Goulding and Kylie Minogue." Markus Brandstetter from Laut.de felt that "for a pop production, there's little to complain about [...] But as international as the record tends to be, it sounds interchangeable in a sea of similar high-gloss electro-pop productions. A perfectly crafted and thoroughly enjoyable commissioned work and also a completely understandable step forward on the part of Meyer-Landrut. For a really memorable and independent work, Crystal Sky lacks a bit of substance." Malin Kompa from Radio Bremen found that Crystal Sky "still sounds pop, but really more electronic than you're used to from Lena."

Sebastian Zabel from the German issue of Rolling Stone magazine gave Crystal Sky two and a half out of five stars. He found that the album was "surprisingly here today, namely close to Goulding and Charli XCX – electro-pop, international standard." Zabel also noted, however, that it lacked "stubbornness." Similarly, Frankfurter Allgemeine Zeitung critic Hannah Feiler wrote that Crystal Sky was suitable for the masses but lacked "individuality." She concluded the album was "too overloaded and as if intoxicated by the synth sound." Aaron Clamann, writing for Rheinische Post noted that "taken on its own, almost every track on the album would make you want to listen to it in the background on the radio. But when heard in one piece, they just seem overwhelming. Above all, the changing rhythms just seem confusing." Dietmar Kanthak from Kölnische Rundschau called the album "empty and without life." He dismissed the album as "interchangeable" and felt that Meyer-Landrut's voice sounded helium-like.

== Chart performance ==
Crystal Sky debuted and peaked at number two on the German Albums Chart in the week of 22 May 2015. It became Meyer-Landrut's fourth consecutive to reach the top two of the chart and would spend 18 weeks inside the top 100. In 2023, eight years after its original release, the album was eventually certified Gold by the Bundesverband Musikindustrie (BVMI) for shipment figures in excess of 100,000 copies. In Austria and Switzerland, Crystal Sky became her lowest-charting album yet, peaking at number 25 on the Austrian Albums Chart and number 40 on the Swiss Albums Chart.

== Track listing ==
All tracks produced by Biffco and Beatgees, with additional programming by Steven Malcolmson. Original production on "Lifeline" by AFSHeen and Josh Cumbee.

Crystal Sky track listing
No.	Title	Writer(s)	Length
1.	"The Girl"	Melisa Bester; Karl Johan Råsmark; Laila Samuelsen	4:09
2.	"Keep on Living"	Lena Meyer-Landrut; Tim Myers; Rosi Golan; Richard Stannard; Ash Howes	3:21
3.	"Traffic Lights"	Alex James; Harry Sommerdahl; Hayley Aitken	2:48
4.	"All Kinds of Crazy"	Meyer-Landrut; Beatgees; Samuelsen; Katrina Noorbergen	3:40
5.	"Beat to My Melody"	Meyer-Landrut; Noorbergen; Jonny Coffer; Sam Preston	3:36
6.	"Sleep Now"	Noorbergen; Alexander Rethwisch; Konstantin Rethwisch; Heiko Fischer	3:47
7.	"Lifeline"	Meyer-Landrut; Afshin Salmani; Josh Cumbee	3:06
8.	"4 Sleeps"	Meyer-Landrut; Beatgees; Samuelsen; Noorbergen	4:06
9.	"We Roam"	Meyer-Landrut; Beatgees; Samuelsen; Noorbergen	3:47
10.	"Crystal Sky"	Meyer-Landrut; Beatgees; Samuelsen; Noorbergen	3:28
11.	"Invisible"	Meyer-Landrut; Noorbergen; Coffer; Preston	3:31
12.	"Catapult" (featuring Kat Vinter and Little Simz)	Meyer-Landrut; Beatgees; Samuelsen; Noorbergen; Simbiatu Ajikawo	5:09
13.	"In the Light"	Ian Barter; Aurora Aksnes; Norma Jean Martine; Noorbergen; Samuelsen	3:18
14.	"Home"	Meyer-Landrut; Coffer; Preston; Katy Beth Young	3:42
Total length:			51:28

Crystal Sky – Deluxe edition
No.	Title	Writer(s)	Length
1.	"The Girl"	Bester; Råsmark; Samuelsen	4:09
2.	"Keep on Living"	Meyer-Landrut; Myers; Golan; Stannard; Howes	3:21
3.	"Wild & Free"	Meyer-Landrut; Sarah Connor; Myers; Beatgees	3:13
4.	"Traffic Lights"	James; Sommerdahl; Aitken	2:48
5.	"All Kinds of Crazy"	Meyer-Landrut; Beatgees; Samuelsen; Noorbergen	3:40
6.	"Galaxies"	Meyer-Landrut; Robin Grubert; Nikki Flores; Stefan Skarbek	3:17
7.	"Beat to My Melody"	Meyer-Landrut; Noorbergen; Coffer; Preston	3:36
8.	"Sleep Now"	Noorbergen; A. Rethwisch; K. Rethwisch; Fischer	3:47
9.	"Lifeline"	Meyer-Landrut; Salmani; Cumbee	3:06
10.	"4 Sleeps"	Meyer-Landrut; Beatgees; Samuelsen; Noorbergen	4:06
11.	"We Roam"	Meyer-Landrut; Beatgees; Samuelsen; Noorbergen	3:47
12.	"Crystal Sky"	Meyer-Landrut; Beatgees; Samuelsen; Noorbergen	3:28
13.	"Invisible"	Meyer-Landrut; Noorbergen; Coffer; Preston	3:31
14.	"Catapult" (featuring Kat Vinter and Little Simz)	Meyer-Landrut; Beatgees; Samuelsen; Noorbergen; Ajikawo	5:09
15.	"Back in Time"	Meyer-Landrut; Beatgees; Samuelsen; Simon Triebel	3:26
16.	"In the Light"	Barter; Aksnes; Martine; Noorbergen; Samuelsen	3:17
17.	"Home"	Meyer-Landrut; Coffer; Preston; Young	3:42
18.	"Beat to My Melody" (Madizin Mix)	Meyer-Landrut; Noorbergen; Coffer; Preston	3:38

2017 limited edition – bonus tracks
No.	Title	Writer(s)	Length
19.	"Satellite"	Julie Frost; John Gordon	2:55
20.	"Stardust"	Golan; Myers	3:31
21.	"Taken By a Stranger"	Gus Seyffert; Nicole Morier; Monica Birkenes	3:24

Limited edition bonus DVD
No.	Title	Length
1.	"Traffic Lights" (Music video)
2.	"Catapult" (Music video)
3.	"Home" (Music video)

Deluxe edition bonus DVD
No.	Title	Length
1.	"Traffic Lights" (MTV Live Sessions)
2.	"Beat to My Melody" (MTV Live Sessions)
3.	"4 Sleeps" (MTV Live Sessions)
4.	"Catapult" (MTV Live Sessions)
5.	"Junimond" (MTV Live Sessions)
6.	"Wild & Free" (Music video)
7.	"Traffic Lights" (Music video)
8.	"Catapult" (Music video)
9.	"Home" (Music video)
10.	"Making of Wild & Free" (Behind the Scenes)
11.	"Making of Traffic Lights" (Behind the Scenes)

== Charts ==
=== Weekly charts ===
Weekly chart performance for Crystal Sky
Chart (2015)	Peak position
Austrian Albums (Ö3 Austria)	25
German Albums (Offizielle Top 100)	2
Swiss Albums (Schweizer Hitparade)	40

== Certifications ==
Certifications for Crystal Sky
Region	Certification	Certified units/sales
Germany (BVMI)	Gold	100,000^{‡}
^{‡} Sales+streaming figures based on certification alone.

== Release history ==
Crystal Sky release history
Region	Date	Edition(s)	Formats	Label	Ref.
Various	15 May 2015	Standard	CD; digital download; vinyl	We Love Music; Universal Music	
Various	23 October 2015	Deluxe; limited	CD; digital download; vinyl	We Love Music; Universal Music	
