= Stardust (Lena album) =

Studio album by Lena
- Released: 12 October 2012
- Length: 39:42
- Label: Universal Music
- Producer: Swen Meyer; Sonny Boy Gustafsson

Lena chronology
Good News (2011)	Stardust (2012)	Crystal Sky (2015)

Singles from Stardust
- 1. "Stardust" Released: 21 September 2012; 2. "Neon (Lonely People)" Released: 15 March 2013; 3. "Mr. Arrow Key" Released: 17 May 2013

Stardust is the third studio album by German singer Lena Meyer-Landrut. It was released by Universal Music on 12 October 2012. Recording for the album took place in Stockholm, London, and Hamburg. A departure from her previous work on her debut album My Cassette Player (2010) and follow-up Good News (2011), both of which had been chiefly produced by former mentor, entertainer Stefan Raab, the singer worked with Swen Meyer and Sonny Boy Gustafsson on the majority of Stardust.

The album earned largely mixed to positive reviews from music critics who felt that Stardust improved on Meyer-Landrut's artistic development and called it more authentic than previous releases. In Germany, the album peaked at number two on the German Albums Chart and was eventually certified Gold by the Bundesverband Musikindustrie (BVMI). Lead single "Stardust" reached number two on the German Singles Chart. In support of the album, Meyer-Landrut embarked on her No One Can Catch Us Tour in 2013.

== Background ==
Stardust marked Meyer-Landrut's first album without contribution from former mentor, entertainer Stefan Raab. Principal songwriting began in late summer 2011 and during that process Lena made travels to Stockholm, London, and Hamburg. Throughout the sessions, she collaborated with musicians like Matthew Benbrook, Pauline Taylor, Johnny McDaid, James Flannigan, and Sonny Boy Gustafsson, who produced five of the songs. Stardust was also partly produced by Swen Meyer in Hamburg. Production on the album was finished in July 2012. Four titles were written in collaboration with Miss Li of which the song "ASAP" is a duet with the Swedish singer-songwriter.

Meyer-Landrut participated on nine songs as co-author. "Better News" and "I'm Black" were composed in collaboration with Ian Dench. The idea to "Don't Panic" was inspired by a fire alert in London. "Mr Arrow Key" is about a guide for the things of life. "Pink Elephant" covers the story of a girl who is clumsy like an elephant. "Goosebumps" is a song about homesickness. "To the Moon" is a love song which took Lena, her co-writer Alexander Schroer and producer Swen Meyer seven months to find suitable lyrics for a certain melody. "Neon (Lonely People)" describes the feeling of loneliness despite the fact that someone is among people. Additionally there is a hidden track called "Lille katt" performed in Swedish previously known from the Swedish-German children's television series Emil i Lönneberga. The iTunes version features a cover version of the title "Moonlight", previously performed by American singer Mayaeni in 2010.

== Promotion ==
The album's lead single, "Stardust" was released on 21 September 2012, while the music video to this song was first shown on 7 September 2012. It charted at number two on the German Singles Chart. On 20 September 2012, Lena previewed the album to a larger audience at the Reeperbahn Festival in the music venue Schmidt's Tivoli in Hamburg. From 5 to 7 October 2012 iTunes pre-released three songs to promote the album. "To the Moon" was the first download, followed by "ASAP" on 6 October and "Pink Elephant" on 7 October.

On April, Meyer-Landrut was touring the Germany, while promoting her album. The tour was called 'No One Can Catch Us', and it's the lyrics from her latest's album lead single Stardust. The tour started on 2 April, in Stuttgart, and ended on 21 April, in Offenbach. Also, Lena was streaming her last show on internet for her fans, who couldn't come to one of her shows. The tour was made of 13 shows in different German cities like Berlin, Hamburg, Hannover and more. Lena also wanted to make a show in Vienna, Austria, but later, the show was cancelled for unknown reasons.

== Critical reception ==
Professional ratings
Review scores
Source	Rating
CDStarts.de	7/10
Focus	6/10
Hitchecker	3/5 stars
Laut.de	3/5 stars
Rolling Stone	3/5 stars

Overall, Stardust received generally mixed to positive reviews from music critics. Andreas Borcholte from Der Spiegel felt that while a musical reinvention "does not take place here, Stardust is an album full of pleasing radio pop like its two predecessors [...] Lena tackles her emancipation as a songwriter with small but noticeable steps. You can tell by the fact that she no longer hides behind mannerisms like her exalted English accent as much as she used to." Süddeutsche Zeitung critic Hans Hoff noted a "lot of swinging titles" on the album, "all a bit tricky and with a lot of lyrics per bar. Just Lena style. Not smooth pop, more playful descriptions of the condition of a 21-year-old who wants to perform in a relaxed manner after all the stress of the ESC years." Matthias Reichel, writing for CDStarts.de, called the album "good work" and noted: "If you allow her a little patience for the artistic development that is already moving in the right direction on Stardust, everyone will be satisfied."

Several reviewers pointed out that former mentor Stefan Raab was not asked to participate in the production. Münchner Merkur critic Jörg Heinrich found that the sound of the album was "much more casual, fresher, more international than Raab's clinically pure TV Total soul." He described Stardust as "colorful pop." The German issue of Rolling Stone magazine gave Stardust three out of five stars and wrote that "this time you actually have the feeling that this is really Lena, and not Stefan Raab's idea of Lena." Neue Presse gave four out of five stars and stated: "No Raab anymore, no more under his wing. Lena spread her 'pop' wings." Kai Butterweck from Laut.de rated the album three out of five stars and wrote that "if you look at it from a sporting point of view, you could say that eleven completely capable team players have gathered around extravagant playmaker Stardust who ultimately guarantee a coherent team appearance – promising basic requirements that not every ambitious professional team can offer." Maximilian Kloes, writing for Focus, called Stardust a "typical Lena album: a few hits, a little filler, strong approaches, flat lyrics."

== Chart performance ==
Stardust debuted and peaked at number two on the German Albums Chart in the week of 26 October 2012 . It became her third consecutive to reach the top two of the chart and would spend 22 weeks inside the top 100. It was eventually ranked 55th on the chart's 2012 year-end listing. In 2013, Stardust was certified Gold by the Bundesverband Musikindustrie (BVMI) for shipment figures in excess of 100,000 copies.

== Track listing ==
Stardust track listing
No.	Title	Writer(s)	Producer(s)	Length
1.	"Stardust"	Rosi Golan; Tim Myers	Swen Meyer	3:30
2.	"Mr. Arrow Key"	Lena Meyer-Landrut; Linda Carlsson; Sonny Boy Gustafsson	Gustafsson	3:34
3.	"Pink Elephant"	John Gordon; Ginger Mackenzie; Mathias Ramson	Gustafsson	3:35
4.	"Neon (Lonely People)"	Meyer-Landrut; Matthew Benbrook; Pauline Taylor	Meyer	3:31
5.	"Better News"	Meyer-Landrut; Ian Dench; Martin Sutton	Meyer	3:02
6.	"Day to Stay"	Meyer-Landrut; Carlsson; Gustafsson	Gustafsson	3:56
7.	"To the Moon"	Meyer-Landrut; Alexander Schroer	Meyer	3:24
8.	"Bliss Bliss"	Tjeerd Bomhof; Elliot James; James Walsh	Meyer	3:11
9.	"ASAP" (featuring Miss Li)	Meyer-Landrut; Carlsson; Gustafsson	Gustafsson	2:48
10.	"I'm Black"	Meyer-Landrut; Dench; Sutton	Meyer	3:05
11.	"Goosebumps"	Meyer-Landrut; Carlsson; Gustafsson	Gustafsson	3:39
12.	"Don't Panic"	Meyer-Landrut; John "Johnny" McDaid; James Flannigan	Meyer	2:27
13.	"Lille katt" (CD only hidden track)	Georg Riedel; Astrid Lindgren	Gustafsson	1:29
Total length:				39:42

iTunes edition
No.	Title	Writer(s)	Producer(s)	Length
13.	"Moonlight"	Per Kristian Ottestad; Golan; Mayaeni Strauss	Gustafsson	3:42

== Charts ==
=== Weekly charts ===
Weekly chart performance for Stardust
Chart (2012)	Peak position
Austrian Albums (Ö3 Austria)	14
German Albums (Offizielle Top 100)	2
Swiss Albums (Schweizer Hitparade)	31

=== Year-end charts ===
Year-end chart performance for Stardust
Chart (2012)	Position
German Albums (Offizielle Top 100)	55

== Certifications ==
Certifications for Stardust
Region	Certification	Certified units/sales
Germany (BVMI)	Gold	100,000^{^}
^{^} Shipments figures based on certification alone.

== Release history ==
Stardust release history
Region	Date	Formats	Label	Ref.
Various	12 October 2012	Universal Music	Digital download; CD; vinyl^{[a]}	

== Notes ==
- ^{^[a]} The vinyl version was an autographed version limited to 1000 copies exclusively sold by Amazon Germany.
