= Only Love, L =

Studio album by Lena
- Released: 5 April 2019
- Length: 45:30
- Label: Polydor
- Producer: Beatgees; Beatzarre; Jr Blender; Djorkaeff; Jugglerz; Pascal Reinhardt

Lena chronology
Crystal Sky (2015)	Only Love, L (2019)	Loyal to Myself (2024)

Singles from Only Love, L
- 1. "Thank You" Released: 16 November 2018; 2. "Don't Lie to Me" Released: 15 March 2019; 3. "Better" Released: 16 August 2019; 4. "Skinny Bitch" Released: 24 January 2020

Only Love, L is the fifth studio album by German singer Lena Meyer-Landrut. It was released by Polydor Records on 5 April 2019. A pop album that incorporates elements of dancehall, trap and R&B, Meyer-Landrut reunited with previous collaborators Philip Böllhoff, Sipho Sililo, David Vogt and Hannes Büsche from production team Beatgees to work on the majority of material for Only Love, L, while additional production was provided by Beatzarre, Jr Blender, Djorkaeff, Jugglerz, and Pascal Reinhardt.

The album earned largely positive reviews from music critics who complimented on its international sound and its lyrical content. Upon release, it peaked at number two on the German Albums Chart, becoming Meyer-Landrut's fifth consecutive album to reach the top two. In Austria and Switzerland, Only Love, L marked her highest-charting album since My Cassette Player (2010). The first two singles from the album include "Thank You" and "Don't Lie to Me", while further singles, including "Better" with Nico Santos, were included on the album's More Love Edition reiussue, released on 6 December 2019.

== Promotion ==
The album's lead single "Thank You" was released on 16 November 2018. The song's music video was released on 29 November 2018 and was directed by Mario Clement. The song debuted and peaked at number 40 in Germany. "Don't Lie to Me" was released as the album's second single on 15 March 2019. The song's music video was released on the same day and was directed by Paul Ripke. The song debuted at number 63 and peaked at number 30 in Germany.

"Sex in the Morning" featuring Ramz was released on 29 March 2019 as the first promotional single from the album. "Boundaries" was used in the German campaign for the movie Dark Phoenix. The official music video was released on 17 May 2019. A music video for "Love" was released as an IGTV video on 28 June 2019. On 3 July 2019 the video was published on YouTube. "Better" with Nico Santos was released as a single on 16 August 2019. It was later included on the album's More Love Edition. "Skinny Bitch" was released as a single on 24 January 2020, along with a music video directed by Paul Hüttemann.

== Critical reception ==
Professional ratings
Review scores
Source	Rating
Laut.de	4/5 stars
Musikexpress	4/6 stars

Philipp Kause from Laut.de found that the songs on Only Love, L "do not necessarily sound like a national, German production. Lena Meyer-Landrut finds her (new) place in the R&B radius of AlunaGeorge or Iggy Azalea, and Afrobeats are also incorporated. Musically and lyrically, the songs are closely related to each other and at the same time explore a lot of range. [...] An international album is blaring from the speaker boxes here and you wouldn't think of Lena. Nevertheless, the whole thing seems authentic and the voice is close, warm and, above all, not auto-tuned." Musikexpress editor Jördis Hagemeier rated the album four of six stars and called Only Love, L a "pretentiously polished piece of pop from the Berlin producer collective Beatgees, which negotiates all sorts of deep themes between R&B and dancehall, Auto-Tune and trap moments: self-acceptance, crossing boundaries, honesty, remorse, strength, and even social criticism in the abstract. Lena has something to say that is easy to understand – you just have to listen to her."

Süddeutsche Zeitung critic Jens-Christian Rabe felt that Only Love, L was "undoubtedly [her] most musically ambitious record [...] It sounds like a very decent contemporary mainstream R&B record sounds like, a bit eclectic stumbled and blown away, but overall just as incredibly well-behaved as you would imagine a singer with big dreams from the pop province to be just imagine it that way." Alina Hasky from Minutenmusik noted that with Only Love, L Meyer-Landrut "has taken a big step in her personal development. The songs are much more personal and show a lot of maturity and self-reflection. Both her voice and the production of the album hardly suggest that it is a German artist, but instead make the whole thing very global. Unfortunately, this also means that certain recognition features that Lena has always stood for in recent years are missing. This causes the authenticity to falter a little, but Lena cannot completely buy it. Only Love, L is very well rounded thematically and vocally – but the big moments are missing."

== Track listing ==
Only Love, L track listing – digital edition
No.	Title	Writer(s)	Producer(s)	Length
1.	"Dear L"	Joe Walter; Lena Meyer-Landrut; Pascal Reinhardt; Steven Bashir	Beatgees	3:19
2.	"Thank You"	Beatgees; Fraser T. Smith; Janee Bennett; Jessica Glynne; Meyer-Landrut; Simon Triebel	Beatgees	3:15
3.	"Private Thoughts"	Jeff Shum; Jimmy Burney; Meyer-Landrut	Beatgees	4:20
4.	"Scared"	Walter; Meyer-Landrut; Reinhardt	Beatgees; Reinhardt	3:15
5.	"Life Was a Beach"	Walter; Jonas Shandel; Meyer-Landrut; Marcus Brosch; Molly Irvine; Reinhardt; Philip Albinger	Beatgees	2:54
6.	"Sex in the Morning" (featuring Ramz)	Chima Ede; David Hofmann; Iman Jordan; Jimmy Harry; Joachim Piehl; Jonas Lang; Meyer-Landrut; Levin Dennler; Martin Willumeit	Jugglerz	3:08
7.	"Note to Myself"	Meyer-Landrut; Patrick Salmy; Bashir	Beatgees	3:06
8.	"Love"	Beatgees; Walter; Meyer-Landrut; Nico Wellenbrink	Beatgees	4:07
9.	"Don't Lie to Me"	Ede; Hofmann; Piehl; Lang; Meyer-Landrut; Dennler; Willumeit; Matt James; Philip Meckseper; Vania Khaleh-Pari	Jr Blender; Beatgees	3:26
10.	"Stuck Inside"	Meyer-Landrut; Max Mostley; Norma Jean Martine	Beatgees	3:46
11.	"Skinny Bitch"	Meyer-Landrut; Mostley; Martine	Beatgees	2:58
12.	"Boundaries"	Cameron Stymeist; Casey Cook; Meyer-Landrut; Nicolas Farmakalidis	Beatgees	4:15
13.	"OK"	Beatgees; Jennifer Kästel; Larissa Herden; Meyer-Landrut	Beatgees	3:41
Total length:				45:30

Physical edition bonus track
No.	Title	Writer(s)	Producer(s)	Length
14.	"If I Wasn't Your Daughter" (Acoustic version)	Jamie Hartman; Konstantin Scherer; Meyer-Landrut; Wellenbrink; Vincent Stein	Djorkaeff; Beatzarre	3:22
Total length:				48:52

More Love edition
No.	Title	Writer(s)	Producer(s)	Length
14.	"Better" (with Nico Santos)	Walter; Kate Morgan; Meyer-Landrut; Wellenbrink; Reinhardt	Reinhardt	3:20
15.	"It Takes Two"	Beatgees; Celine Dorka; Chris Cronauer; Scherer; Meyer-Landrut; Marc Lennard; Nico Santos; Stein	Beatgees	3:33
16.	"Thank You" (Acoustic version)	Beatgees; Smith; Bennett; Glynne; Meyer-Landrut; Triebel	Beatgees	3:10
17.	"Don't Lie to Me" (Acoustic version)	Ede; Hofmann; Piehl; Lang; Meyer-Landrut; Dennler; Willumeit; James; Meckseper; Khaleh-Pari	Jr Blender; Beatgees	3:18
18.	"Skinny Bitch" (Acoustic version)	Meyer-Landrut; Mostley; Martine	Beatgees	3:22
19.	"Better" (Acoustic version, with Nico Santos)	Walter; Morgan; Meyer-Landrut; Wellenbrink; Reinhardt	Reinhardt	3:40
Total length:				65:53

Notes

- All track titles are stylised in all lowercase.

== Charts ==
=== Weekly charts ===
Weekly chart performance for Only Love, L
Chart (2019)	Peak position
Austrian Albums (Ö3 Austria)	4
German Albums (Offizielle Top 100)	2
Swiss Albums (Schweizer Hitparade)	14

=== Year-end charts ===
Year-end chart performance for Only Love, L
Chart (2019)	Position
German Albums (Offizielle Top 100)	67

== Release history ==
Only Love, L release history
Region	Date	Edition(s)	Format(s)	Label	Ref.
Various	5 April 2019	Standard	CD; digital download; streaming	Polydor	
Various	6 December 2019	More Love	CD; digital download; streaming	Polydor	
