= Wild & Free (song) =

Single by Lena

from the album Fack Ju Göhte 2
- Released: 11 September 2015
- Length: 3:14
- Label: Polydor; Island
- Songwriter(s): Beatgees; Sarah Connor; Lena Meyer-Landrut; Tim Myers
- Producer(s): Beatgees; Tim Myers

Lena singles chronology
"Traffic Lights" (2015)	"Wild & Free" (2015)	"Beat to My Melody" (2016)

Music video
- "Wild & Free" on YouTube

"Wild & Free" is a song by German recording artist Lena Meyer-Landrut. It was written by Meyer-Landrut, Sarah Connor, Tim Myers, and production team Beatgees, and produced by the latter along with Myers for the soundtrack of the motion picture Fack ju Göhte 2 (2015). The song was released on 11 September 2015 as a digital single and later included on the deluxe version of Lena's Crystal Sky album.

== Music video ==
A music video to accompany the release of "Wild & Free" was first released onto YouTube on 11 September 2015 at a total length of three minutes and fourteen seconds. The video has over 79 million views on YouTube (August 2025)

== Track listing ==
Digital download – Single
No.	Title	Writer(s)	Length
1.	"Wild & Free"	Lena Meyer-Landrut; Beatgees; Sarah Connor; Tim Myers	3:14
2.	"All Kinds of Crazy"	Lena Meyer-Landrut; Beatgees; Laila Samuelsen; Katrina Noorbergen	3:40

== Charts ==
=== Weekly charts ===
Weekly chart performance for "Wild & Free"
Chart (2015–16)	Peak position
Austria (Ö3 Austria Top 40)	21
Germany (GfK)	8
Switzerland (Schweizer Hitparade)	37

=== Year-end charts ===
Year-end chart performance for "Wild & Free"
Chart (2015)	Position
Germany (Official German Charts)	71

== Certifications ==
Certifications for "Wild & Free"
Region	Certification	Certified units/sales
Germany (BVMI)	Gold	200,000^{‡}
^{‡} Sales+streaming figures based on certification alone.

== Release history ==
"Wild & Free" release history
Region	Date	Format(s)	Label	Ref.
Germany	11 September 2015	Digital download	Polydor; Island	
