= Mr. Arrow Key =

2013 single by Lena

Single by Lena

from the album Stardust
- Released: 17 May 2013
- Length: 3:33
- Label: Universal
- Songwriters: Lena Meyer-Landrut; Linda Carlsson; Sonny Boy Gustafsson
- Producer: Sonny Boy Gustafsson

Lena singles chronology
"Neon (Lonely People)" (2013)	"Mr. Arrow Key" (2013)	"Traffic Lights" (2015)

"Mr. Arrow Key" is a song by German recording artist Lena Meyer-Landrut. It was written by Meyer-Landrut, Linda "Miss Li" Carlsson and Sonny Boy Gustafsson for her third studio album Stardust (2012), while production was helmed by the latter. "Mr. Arrow Key" was released as the album's third and final single and reached the top fifty of the German Singles Chart.

== Background ==
"Mr. Arrow Key" was written by Meyer-Landrut in collaboration with Swedish singer-songwriter Miss Li and producer Sonny Boy Gustafsson. Recorded in Sweden, Gröhndal Årstaberg studio, the song genre is described as pop song with folk and swing influences. Lyrically, "Mr. Arrow Key" is about conflict in life, and the desire to find something or someone who would set a clear direction. Arrow Key means an arrow button, but in song metaphorically this means one direction: "Been climbing up/the walls but I am falling down/I’ve been running through the streets/But I still haven’t found/I’m looking for, I’m searching for it desperately/But I can’t find the arrow key." In an interview with Universal, Lena talked about this song:

"In recent years, I have sometimes wished me someone who relieves me of tricky decisions. Someone with an ultimate plan for my life. A kind of very personal navigation system. And that's the point in 'Mr. Arrow Key'. I wrote lyrics and melody together with the wonderful Linda Carlsson and the production Sonny Gustafsson took over. Two people who work for me musically almost to over-production of the album Mr. Arrow Key. In addition, I always wanted a song with one of these retro trumpets, as we know from 'Beirut'. And now I finally got one."

On April 18, it was announced, that "Mr. Arrow Key" would serve as Lena's seventh single and third single from her album via her own and official website. In early May, "Mr. Arrow Key", as single, was put on Amazon.

== Performances ==
The first television presenting was on breakfast television at the broadcasting station Sat.1 on 12 October 2012. Back in September, 2012, Lena performed this song for the first time in festival, Reeperbahn Festival 2012, with some other songs from her album. Meyer-Landrut also performed the song several times on her latest tour, No One Can Catch Us. On May 10, 2013, she performed it on The Voice Kids final. The performance consisted of Lena either sitting or standing on black platform and her dancing on the stage in front of audience.

== Critical reception ==
Critical reception of "Mr. Arrow Key" was generally mixed. Birgit Fuss from Rolling Stone described the song as "irresistible catchy" and compared Meyer-Landrut's vocals with singer Amy Macdonald. Münchner Merkur writer Jörg Heinrich called the song a "speedy folk-country-cracker". He also cited comparisons with Macdonald. Kevin Holtmann from Plattentests.de declared "Mr. Arrow Key" a well-crafted "meaningless nonsense sixties with polkadots sauce." Kai Butterweck, writing from Laut.de, wrote: "Lena gathered a thunderous swing horde around him. Childishly happy as ever she tries to squeeze a large part of their English vocabulary in three and a half minutes. By the end of the chorus, the original tempo is actually good, but not quite follow, and then the trained habits of overseas accent in many places sounds put something."

== Music video ==
The music video was first released on 14 May 2013. It combines several scenes from Meyer-Landrut's No One Can Catch Us Tour to 13 German cities, in particular from her gig in Offenbach am Main.

== Track listing ==
Digital single
No.	Title	Writer(s)	Producer(s)	Length
1.	"Mr. Arrow Key"	Lena Meyer-Landrut; Linda Carlsson; Sonny Boy Gustafsson	Gustafsson	3:33
2.	"Mr. Arrow Key" (live in Hamburg)	Meyer-Landrut; Carlsson; Gustafsson		4:18
3.	"Stardust" (live in Hamburg)	Rosi Golan; Tim Myers		5:06
4.	"Goosebumps" (live in Hamburg)	Meyer-Landrut; Carlsson; Gustafsson		4:38

== Credits and personnel ==
- Greg Calbi – mastering
- Linda Carlsson – writer
- Clas Lassbo – bass
- Sonny Boy Gustafsson – instruments, producer, writer
- Johan Jonsson – trumpet
- Linus Lindblom – tenor saxophone
- Lena Meyer-Landrut – lead vocals, writer
- Gustav Nahlin – drums
- Black Pete – mixing
- Magnus Wiklund – trombone

== Charts ==
Weekly chart performance for "Mr. Arrow Key"
Chart (2013)	Peak position
Germany (GfK)	46
