= Strip (Lena song) =

Single by Lena

from the album Loyal to Myself
- Released: 4 June 2021
- Length: 2:46
- Label: Polydor
- Songwriters: Lena Meyer-Landrut; Nicolas Rebscher; Sophie Simmons
- Producers: Nicolas Rebscher; Yannick Ernst

Lena singles chronology
"Better" (2019)	"Strip" (2021)	"Looking for Love" (2022)

"Strip" is a song by German singer Lena Meyer-Landrut. It was written by Meyer-Landrut along with Nicolas Rebscher and Sophie Simmons, while production was helmed by Rebscher and Yannick Ernst. The song was released by Polydor as a standalone single on 4 June 2021 and later included as a bonus track on her sixth studio album Loyal to Myself (2024).

== Chart performance ==
"Strip" debuted at number 78 on the German Singles Chart in the week of 11 June 2021. It eventually peaked at number 70 in its ninth week. The song also peaked at number six on the German Airplay Chart. It was eventually ranked 63rd on the latter's year-end chart.

== Music video ==
A music video for "Strip" was directed by Stini Roehrs. It premiered online on 12 June 2022. The visuals were preceded by a lyric video, released on 4 June 2021, and followed by a video for the cozy winter version of "Strip," released on 17 December 2021.

== Track listing ==
Digital single (winter version)
No.	Title	Length
1.	"Strip" (cozy winter version)	3:30
2.	"Strip" (single version)	2:46

== Charts ==
=== Weekly charts ===
Weekly chart performance for "Strip"
Chart (2021)	Peak position
Germany (GfK)	70
Germany (Official Airplay Charts)	6

=== Year-end charts ===
Year-end chart performance for "Strip"
Chart (2021)	Position
Germany (Official Airplay Charts)	63

== Release history ==
"Strip" release history
Region	Date	Edition(s)	Format(s)	Label	Ref.
Various	4 June 2021	Single version	Digital download; streaming	Polydor	
Various	10 December 2021	Cozy winter version	Digital download; streaming	Polydor	
