= Beat to My Melody =

Single by Lena

from the album Crystal Sky
- Released: 8 April 2016
- Genre: Pop; electro-pop
- Length: 3:35
- Label: Universal Music Germany
- Songwriters: Lena Meyer-Landrut; Johnny Coffer; Sam Preston; Katrina Noorbergen
- Producers: Beatgees; Biffco

Lena singles chronology
"Wild & Free" (2015)	"Beat to My Melody" (2016)	"Lost in You" (2017)

Music video
- "Beat to My Melody (Dayne S Remix)" on YouTube

"Beat to My Melody" is a song by German recording artist Lena Meyer-Landrut. It was written by Meyer-Landrut, Johnny Coffer, Sam Preston, and Katrina Noorbergen for the former's fourth studio album Crystal Sky (2015). The song was released by Universal Music Germany as the album's third single on 8 April 2016.

== Background and release ==
"Beat to My Melody" is an electronic pop song, featuring oriental elements in its production. The song was written by Lena Meyer-Landrut, Jonny Coffer, Katrina Noorbergen and Sam Preston and was recorded at Jonny Coffers studios in London. It was produced by British producer Biffco and the German producer duo Beatgees, who produced 13 of 14 tracks of the album "Crystal Sky".

The song was remixed by German producer team Madizin for the re-release of "Crystal Sky" where it can be found as a bonus track. The mix also serves as the single version of the song.

== Cover art ==
The cover design follows the designs of the previous single covers and that of the album cover, using the same kaleidoscopic effect and the same font work. The picture used is a still picture from the music video for "Wild & Free".

== Music video ==
The accompanying music video was shot in Berlin and features scenes filmed at the Heinrich-von-Kleist-Park in Schöneberg. It was directed by German director Vi-Dan Tran, who also directed the videos for Lena's previous singles "Wild & Free" as well as the album tracks "Catapult" and "Home", and was co-directed by German singer Lary, who made her directing debut with this video. The video was produced by the BNTB-Agency. On 25 March 2016 a music video for the "Dayne S Remix" of the single was exclusively released on her YouTube channel. The video have over 1 million views on YouTube.

== Promotion ==
The song was first performed live at the Grand Prix Party for the Eurovision Song Contest 2015 on 24 May 2015, broadcast by the ARD. Lena also performed the song for MTV Germany in an episode of MTV Live Sessions. She also performed the song on German telenovela Gute Zeiten, schlechte Zeiten along with "Traffic Lights" to promote the album, the performance was broadcated on 15 October 2015. The song is part of her setlist of the "Carry You Home Tour" in support of her fourth studio album.

== Track listing ==
- Remix EP
1. "Beat to My Melody" (Dayne S Remix) – 3:40
2. "Beat to My Melody" (YOUNOTUS Remix) – 3:17
3. "Beat to My Melody" (Sterio Remix) – 3:55
4. "Beat to My Melody" (Robin Grubert Remix) – 3:15
5. "Beat to My Melody" (Madizin Lake House Mix) – 3:48

== Release history ==
Region	Date	Format(s)	Label
Germany	8 April 2016	Digital download – Remix EP	Universal Music Germany
