= Looking for Love (Lena song) =

Single by Lena

from the album Loyal to Myself
- Released: 23 June 2022
- Length: 2:39
- Label: Polydor
- Songwriter(s): Beatgees; Lena Meyer-Landrut; Yanek Stärk; David Vogt; Joe Walter
- Producer(s): Beatgees; Yanek Stärk

Lena singles chronology
"Strip" (2021)	"Looking for Love" (2022)	"Life Was a Beach" (2022)

"Looking for Love" is a song by German singer Lena Meyer-Landrut. It was written by Meyer-Landrut along with Yanek Stärk, David Vogt, Joe Walter and frequent collaborators Philip Böllhoff, Sipho Sililo, David Vogt and Hannes Büsche from production team Beatgees, while production was helmed by Stärk and Beatgees. The song was released by Polydor as a standalone single on 23 June 2022 and later included as a bonus track on her sixth studio album Loyal to Myself (2024).

== Chart performance ==
While it failed to chart on the German Singles Chart, "Looking for Love" peaked at number one on the German Airplay Chart. It was eventually ranked 18th on the latter's year-end ranking.

== Music video ==
A music video for "Looking for Love" was directed by Maximilian Pauly. It premiered online on 24 June 2022. A lyric video for the alternative version of the song was released on 5 August 2022, followed by the lyric video for the winter version of "Looking for Love" on 19 December.

== Track listing ==
Digital single (alternative version)
No.	Title	Length
1.	"Looking for Love" (alternative version)	2:43
2.	"Looking for Love" (single version)	2:39

Digital single (winter version)
No.	Title	Length
1.	"Looking for Love" (winter version)	3:00
2.	"Looking for Love" (single version)	2:39

== Charts ==
=== Weekly charts ===
Weekly chart performance for "Looking for Love"
Chart (2022)	Peak position
Germany (Official Airplay Charts)	1

=== Year-end charts ===
Year-end chart performance for "Looking for Love"
Chart (2022)	Position
Germany (Official Airplay Charts)	18

== Release history ==
"Looking for Love" release history
Region	Date	Edition(s)	Format(s)	Label	Ref.
Various	23 June 2022	Single version	Digital download; streaming	Polydor	
Various	5 August 2022	Alternative version	Digital download; streaming	Polydor	
Various	19 December 2022	Winter version	Digital download; streaming	Polydor	
