= Loyal to Myself (song) =

Single by Lena

from the album Loyal to Myself
- Released: 15 March 2024
- Length: 2:27
- Label: Polydor
- Songwriter(s): Lena Meyer-Landrut; Hannah Wilson; Nicolas Rebscher; Sam Merrifield
- Producer(s): Nicolas Rebscher

Lena singles chronology
"Straitjacket" (2023)	"Loyal to Myself" (2024)

"Loyal to Myself" is a song by German singer Lena Meyer-Landrut. It was written by Meyer-Landrut along with Hannah Wilson, Sam Merrifield, and Nicolas Rebscher for her same-titled sixth studio album (2024), while production was helmed by the latter. It was released by Polydor as the album's lead single on 15 March 2024 and has since peaked at number 25 on the German Airplay Chart.

== Chart performance ==
Released as the lead single from its same-titled parent album on 15 March 2024, "Loyal to Myself" has since peaked at number 27 on the German Airplay Chart.

== Music video ==
A music video for "Loyal to Myself" was directed by Adam Munnings and produced by Jan Hellerung for COMMONVISION. It premiered online on 22 March 2024.

== Track listing ==
Digital single
No.	Title	Writer(s)	Producer(s)	Length
1.	"Loyal to Myself"	Lena Meyer-Landrut; Hannah Wilson; Nicolas Rebscher; Sam Merrifield	Rebscher	2:28
2.	"Straitjacket"	Meyer-Landrut; Hailey Collier; Nikolay Mohr; Sophia Brenan	Mohr	2:39
3.	"What I Want"	Meyer-Landrut; Pascal "Kalli" Reinhardt; Joe Walter	Reinhardt	2:49

== Personnel and credits ==
- Sascha "Busy" Bühren – mastering engineer
- Bella Dilthey – backing vocalist
- Matty Green – mixing engineer
- Sam Merrifield – writer
- Lena Meyer-Landrut – vocalist, writer
- Eric Nagel – backing vocalist
- Nicolas Rebscher – backing vocalist, producer, writer
- Hannah Wilson – writer

== Charts ==
Weekly chart performance for "Loyal to Myself"
Chart (2024)	Peak position
Germany (Official Airplay Charts)	25

== Release history ==
"Loyal to Myself" release history
Region	Date	Format(s)	Label	Ref.
Various	15 March 2024	Digital download; streaming	Polydor	
