= Lost in You (Lena Meyer-Landrut song) =

Single by Lena
- Released: 14 April 2017
- Length: 3:30
- Label: Lena; Universal
- Songwriter(s): Lena Meyer-Landrut; Vincent Stein; Konstantin Scherer; Wim Treuner; Nico Wellenbrink

Lena singles chronology
"Beat to My Melody" (2016)	"Lost in You" (2017)	"If I Wasn't Your Daughter" (2017)

"Lost in You" is a song by German recording artist Lena Meyer-Landrut. It was released on 14 April 2017 as a single. The song was written by Meyer-Landrut, Vincent Stein, Konstantin Scherer, Wim Treuner and Nico Wellenbrink.

== Track listing ==
Digital download
No.	Title	Length
1.	"Lost in You"	3:30

== Charts ==
Weekly chart performance for "Lost in You"
Chart (2017)	Peak position
Austria (Ö3 Austria Top 40)	72
Germany (GfK)	58

== Release history ==
"Lost in You" release history
Region	Date	Format(s)	Label	Ref.
Germany	14 April 2017	Digital download	Lena; Universal	
