= Straitjacket (song) =

Single by Lena

from the album Loyal to Myself
- Released: 27 October 2023
- Length: 2:39
- Label: Polydor
- Songwriter(s): Lena Meyer-Landrut; Hailey Collier; Nikolay Mohr; Sophia Brenan
- Producer(s): Nikolay Mohr

Lena singles chronology
"What I Want" (2023)	"Straitjacket" (2023)	"Loyal to Myself" (2024)

"Straitjacket" is a song by German singer Lena Meyer-Landrut. It was written by Meyer-Landrut along with Sophia Brena, Hailey Collier, and Nikolay Mohr, while production was helmed by the latter. It was released by Polydor as a single on 27 October 2023 and peaked at number 25 on the German Airplay Chart. The song was eventually included as a bonus track on her sixth studio album Loyal to Myself (2024).

== Chart performance ==
While it failed to chart on the German Singles Chart, "Straitjacket" peaked at number 25 on the German Airplay Chart.

== Music video ==
A music video for "Straitjacket" was directed by Vincent Boehringer. It premiered online on 31 October 2023.

== Personnel and credits ==
- Sophia Brenan – writer
- Sascha "Busy" Bühren – mastering engineer
- Hailey Collier – writer
- Lena Meyer-Landrut – vocalist, writer
- Nikolay Mohr – mixing engineer, producer, writer

== Charts ==
Weekly chart performance for "Straitjacket"
Chart (2023)	Peak position
Germany (Official Airplay Charts)	25

== Release history ==
"Loyal to Myself" release history
Region	Date	Format(s)	Label	Ref.
Various	27 October 2023	Digital download; streaming	Polydor	
