= Don't Lie to Me (Lena Meyer-Landrut song) =

Single by Lena

from the album Only Love, L
- Released: 15 March 2019
- Length: 3:26
- Label: Universal
- Songwriter(s): Chima Ede; David Hofmann; Joachim Piehl; Jonas Lang; Lena Meyer-Landrut; Levin Dennler; Martin Willumeit; Matt James; Philip Meckseper; Vania Khaleh-Pari
- Producer(s): Jr Blender; Beatgees

Lena singles chronology
"Thank You" (2018)	"Don't Lie to Me" (2019)	"Better" (2019)

"Don't Lie to Me" is a song performed by German singer Lena Meyer-Landrut. It was released as a digital download on 15 March 2019 as the second single from her fifth studio album Only Love, L (2019). The song peaked at number 30 on the German Singles Chart.

== Music video ==
A music video to accompany the release of "Don't Lie to Me" was first released onto YouTube on 15 March 2019. It was directed by Paul Ripke.

== Track listing ==
Digital download
No.	Title	Length
1.	"Don't Lie to Me"	3:26

== Charts ==
Weekly chart performance for "Don't Lie to Me"
Chart (2019)	Peak position
Austria (Ö3 Austria Top 40)	39
Germany (GfK)	30

== Certifications ==
Certifications for "Don't Lie to Me"
Region	Certification	Certified units/sales
Germany (BVMI)	Gold	200,000^{‡}
^{‡} Sales+streaming figures based on certification alone.

== Release history ==
"Don't Lie to Me" release history
Region	Date	Format(s)	Label
Germany	15 March 2019	Digital download; streaming	Universal Music Group
