= What I Want (Lena song) =

Single by Lena

from the album Loyal to Myself
- Released: 16 June 2023
- Length: 2:50
- Label: Polydor
- Songwriter(s): Lena Meyer-Landrut; Pascal "Kalli" Reinhardt; Joe Walter
- Producer(s): Pascal "Kalli" Reinhardt

Lena singles chronology
"Life Was a Beach" (2022)	"What I Want" (2023)	"Straitjacket" (2023)

"What I Want" is a song by German singer Lena Meyer-Landrut. It was written by Meyer-Landrut along with Joe Walter and Pascal "Kalli" Reinhardt, while production was helmed by the latter. Expected so serve as the lead single from her sixth studio album, Loyal to Myself (2024), it was issued by Polydor on 16 June 2023 but later demoted and replaced by the album's title track after Meyer-Landrut decided to revamp much of the album in favor of a different sound.

== Chart performance ==
While it failed to chart on the German Singles Chart, "What I Want" peaked at number one on the German Airplay Chart in the week of 28 August 2023.

== Music video ==
A music video for "What I Want" was directed by Felix Aaron. It premiered online on 16 June 2023. Visuals for the acoustic version of the song, directed by Eric Nagel, were released on 21 July 2023.

== Track listing ==
Digital single (acoustic version)
No.	Title	Length
1.	"Looking for Love" (acoustic version)	3:06
2.	"Looking for Love" (single version)	2:49

== Personnel and credits ==
- Sascha "Busy" Bühren – mastering engineer
- Lena Meyer-Landrut – vocalist, writer
- Pascal "Kalli" Reinhardt – mixing engineer, producer, writer
- Joe Walter – writer

== Charts ==
=== Weekly charts ===
Weekly chart performance for "What I Want"
Chart (2023)	Peak position
Germany (Official Airplay Charts)	1

=== Year-end charts ===
Year-end chart performance for "What I Want"
Chart (2023)	Position
Germany (Official Airplay Charts)	35

== Release history ==
"What I Want" release history
Region	Date	Edition(s)	Format(s)	Label	Ref.
Various	16 June 2023	Single version	Maxi single; digital download; streaming	Polydor	
Various	21 July 2023	Acoustic version	Maxi single; digital download; streaming	Polydor	
