= Stardust (Lena Meyer-Landrut song) =

Single by Lena

from the album Stardust
- Released: September 21, 2012
- Length: 3:31
- Label: USFO; Universal
- Songwriters: Rosi Golan; Tim Myers
- Producer: Swen Meyer

Lena singles chronology
"What a Man" (2011)	"Stardust" (2012)	"Neon (Lonely People)" (2013)

Music video
- "Stardust" on YouTube

"Stardust" is a song recorded by German singer Lena Meyer-Landrut. It was written by Rosi Golan and Tim Myers and produced by Swen Meyer for her same-titled third studio album (2012). Built upon a percussion-heavy melody, the song was released by Universal Music Germany on 21 September 2012, as the album's lead single. Meyer-Landrut described "Stardust" as "Michael Jackson meets The Kelly Family."

The song earned largely positive reviews from music critics who called it Stardust's highlight. It debuted and peaked at number two on the German Singles Chart, reaching Gold status, and peaked within the top 20 of the Austrian Singles Chart. Its music video, directed by Bode Brodmüller and filmed in the Spanish Bardenas Reales semi-desert in southeast Navarre, won the Echo Music Prize for Best Video, while the song itself was nominated for Best Single at the 1LIVE Krone Awards.

== Background ==
"Stardust" was composed by Israeli-American singer-songwriter Rosi Golan, and American musician Tim Myers, a former member of OneRepublic. Golan had previously written the songs "Bee" and "I Like You," both of which had been recorded by Meyer-Landrut for her first two studio albums My Cassette Player (2010) and Good News (2011). In an interview with Süddeutsche Zeitung, Meyer-Landrut said that when she first heard "Stardust" she thought it sounded like "Michael Jackson meets The Kelly Family", but then she was impressed by the "wild drumming and the slightly Indigenous-like battle songs."

== Promotion ==
Meyer-Landrut premiered "Stardust" during a promotional event in Munich on 30 July 2012. Its radio premiere was on 8 August 2012. The first international presentation was during the 40th anniversary of Porsche Design in Beverly Hills, Los Angeles on 4 September. Both a CD single and a digital single of "Stardust" were made available on 21 September 2012. "Time," a cover version of English indie band Ben's Brother, written by band members Ian Mack and Jamie Hartman, was included as a b-side.

Also in 2012, "Stardust" was chosen as title track for Florian David Fitz's comedy drama film Jesus liebt mich. In March 2014, it was first used as promotional music by the British TV channel ITV for their spring-summer programming advert. In 2014, the original composer Golan performed an own version for the soundtrack of the film You're Not You starring Hilary Swank and Emmy Rossum.

== Critical reception ==
Kai Butterweck from Laut.de called "Stardust" its parent album's "extravagant playmaker [with] catchy Florence and The Machine opulence. Maximilian Kloes, writing for Focus, cited the song as the album's biggest highlight, in "which Lena's thin voice gets lost in the vastness of the soundscape and decorates and distorts the strong, percussion-heavy melody." Matthias Reichel from CDStarts.de found that "Stardust" was "quite easy to hear" and "appeared more musically sophisticated and, despite all the variety, more directly and personally tailored to the singer's character." Contrary, Andreas Borcholte from Der Spiegel declared the song "one of the weaker tracks on the album."

== Chart performance ==
"Stardust" debuted and peaked at number two on the German Singles Chart in the week of 5 October 2012 – only behind Israeli singer Asaf Avidan's "One Day / Reckoning Song (Wankelmut Rmx)." It marked Meyer-Landrut's third top two hit in Germany and was eventually ranked 43rd on the German year-end chart. In December 2012, the song was certified Gold by the Bundesverband Musikindustrie (BVMI). While it was less successful elsewhere, it became Meyer-Landrut's highest-charting single in Austria since "Satellite," reaching number 14.

== Music video ==
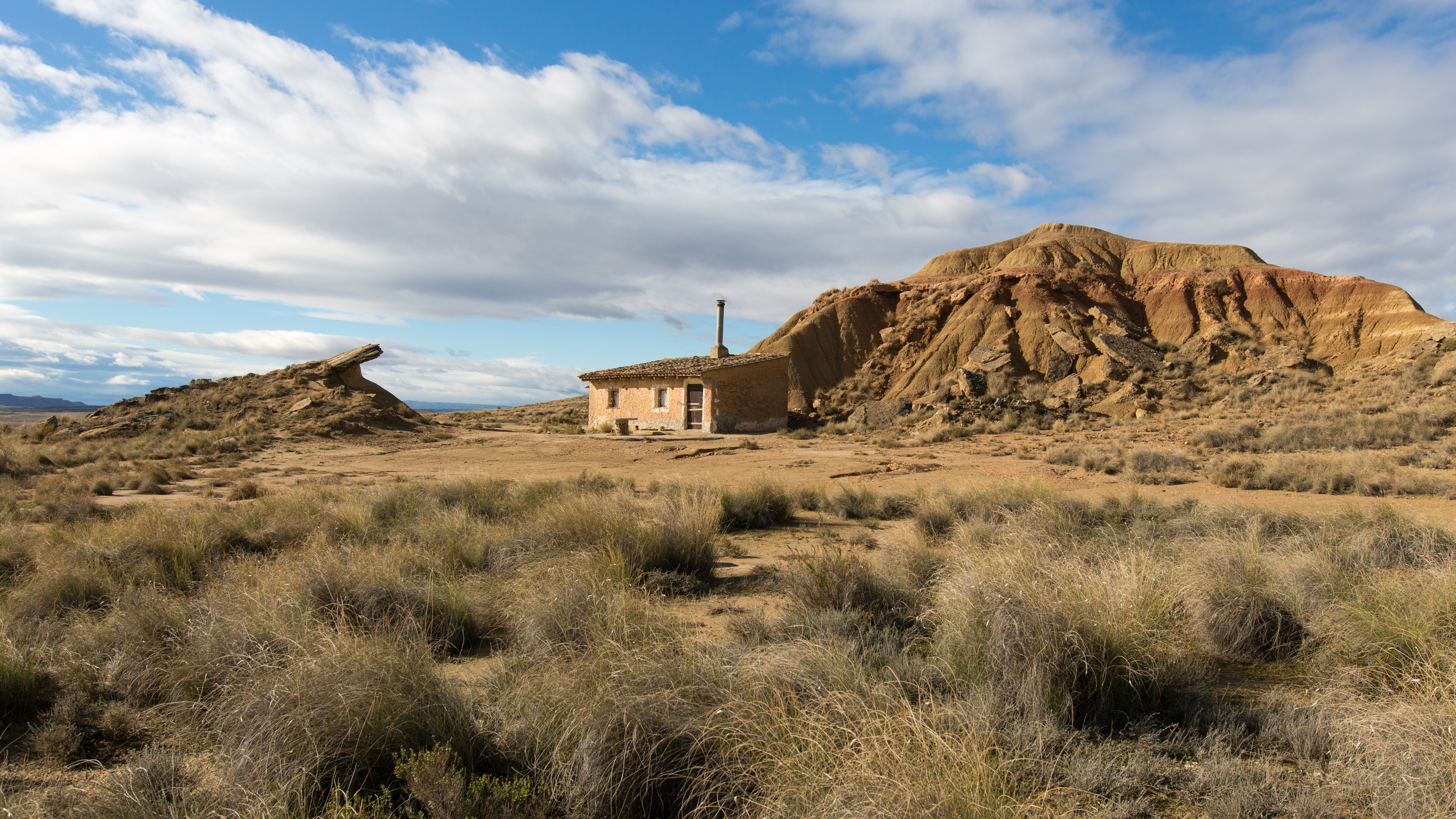
The video for "Starfust" was filmed in the Bardenas Reales semi-desert.

A music video for "Stardust" was directed by Bode Brodmüller and filmed in the Spanish Bardenas Reales semi-desert in southeast Navarre in August 2012. Released on 7 September 2012, the visuals focus on Meyer-Landrut who is either dancing, standing, running and laying on the floor in several dresses or is bathing. The women in the background are covered with mud. On 21 March 2013, the music video was awarded the Echo Music Prize in the Best Video category.

== Track listing ==
CD single
No.	Title	Writer(s)	Producer(s)	Length
1.	"Stardust"	Rosi Golan; Tim Myers	Swen Meyer	3:31
2.	"Time"	Jamie Hartman; Ian Mack	Meyer	4:21

== Personnel ==
- Writers: Rosi Golan, Tim Myers
- Producer: Swen Meyer
- Lead vocals: Lena Meyer-Landrut
- Guitar, glockenspiel: Marcus Schneider
- Drums: Reiner "Kallas" Hubert
- Bass: Felix Weigt
- Piano: Arne Straube
- Percussion: Swen Meyer
- Cello: Hagen Kuhr
- Background vocals: Ruben Seevers, Anna Katharina Bauer, Mo Bahla

== Charts ==
=== Weekly charts ===
Weekly chart performance for "Stardust"
Chart (2012)	Peak position
Austria (Ö3 Austria Top 40)	14
Germany (GfK)	2
Luxembourg Digital Songs (Billboard)	9
Switzerland (Schweizer Hitparade)	74

=== Year-end charts ===
Year-end chart performance for "Stardust"
Chart (2012)	Position
Germany (Official German Charts)	43

== Certifications ==
Certifications for "Stardust"
Region	Certification	Certified units/sales
Germany (BVMI)	Gold	150,000^{^}
^{^} Shipments figures based on certification alone.

== Release history ==
"Stardust" release history
Region	Date	Format(s)	Label	Ref.
Various	21 September 2012	CD single; download	USFO; Universal Music Germany	
