= Germany in the Eurovision Song Contest 2011 =

- Eurovision Song Contest 2011
- Participating broadcaster: ARD (Note: Arbeitsgemeinschaft der öffentlich-rechtlichen Rundfunkanstalten der Bundesrepublik Deutschland) – Norddeutscher Rundfunk (NDR)
- Country: Germany
- Selection process: Artist: Internal selection Song: Unser Song für Deutschland
- Selection date: Artist: 30 June 2010; Song: 18 February 2011

Competing entry
- Song: "Taken by a Stranger"
- Artist: Lena
- Songwriters: Gus Seyffert; Nicole Morier; Monica Birkenes

Placement
- Final result: 10th, 107 points

Participation chronology

Germany was represented at the Eurovision Song Contest 2011 with the song "Taken by a Stranger", written by Gus Seyffert, Nicole Morier, and Monica Birkenes, and performed by Lena. The German participating broadcaster on behalf of ARD, Norddeutscher Rundfunk (NDR), organised the national final Unser Song für Deutschland in order to select their entry for the contest, after having previously selected the performer internally. In addition, NDR was also the host broadcaster and staged the event at the Düsseldorf Arena in Düsseldorf, after winning the previous edition with the song "Satellite" also performed by Lena.

ARD and NDR announced on 30 June 2010 that they had internally selected Lena to represent Germany at the 2011 contest after her win in 2010. The song selection entitled Unser Song für Deutschland consisted of two semi-finals and a final held in January and February 2011. The selection featured twelve competing songs with six songs competing in each semi-final; the top three songs advanced to the final via public televote. In the final, the winning song was selected through two rounds of public televoting. "Taken by a Stranger" was selected as the German song for Düsseldorf after placing among the top two during the first round of voting and ultimately gaining 79% of the votes in the second round.

As the host country, Germany qualified to compete directly in the final of the Eurovision Song Contest. Performing in position 16 during the final, Germany placed tenth out of the 25 participating countries with 107 points.

== Background ==
Prior to the 2011 contest, ARD has participated in the Eurovision Song Contest representing Germany fifty-four times since its debut in 1956. It has won the contest on two occasions: in 1982 with the song "Ein bißchen Frieden" performed by Nicole and in 2010 with the song "Satellite" performed by Lena. Germany, to this point, has been noted for having competed in the contest more than any other country; they have competed in every contest since the first edition in 1956 except for the 1996 contest when the nation was eliminated in a pre-contest elimination round.

As part of its duties as participating broadcaster, ARD organises the selection of its entry in the Eurovision Song Contest and broadcasts the event in the country. Since 1996, ARD has delegated the participation in the contest to its member Norddeutscher Rundfunk (NDR). Between 1996 and 2008, NDR had set up single-show national finals with several artists to choose both the song and performer to compete at Eurovision for Germany. NDR internally selected both the artist and song for the contest in 2009, while a multi-show national final in the format of a talent show contest was organised in 2010. Following the announcement in June 2010 that Lena was internally selected to again represent the country, the broadcaster announced on 16 December 2010 that it would organise a national final to select the song she would perform at the contest.

== Before Eurovision ==
=== Artist selection ===
During the winner's press conference of the Eurovision Song Contest 2010, it was announced that Lena would again represent Germany to defend her title. Lena was later confirmed by the German broadcaster NDR to have been selected as the German representative on 30 June 2010.

=== Unser Song für Deutschland ===
The logo of Unser Song für Deutschland

Unser Song für Deutschland (English: Our Song for Germany) was the competition that selected the German song for the Eurovision Song Contest 2011. The competition consisted of two semi-finals and a final that took place on 31 January 2011, 7 February 2011 and 18 February 2011, respectively, at the Köln-Mülheim Studios in Cologne and were hosted by Matthias Opdenhövel and Sabine Heinrich. Like in the previous year, the national final was co-produced by the production company Brainpool. Lena presented twelve songs, selected by a panel of music experts together with Stefan Raab and Lena from over 600 songs submitted by individual composers and lyricists and later included in her second studio album Good News, during the competition and public televoting determined the results of all three shows. The semi-finals were broadcast on ProSieben and the final was broadcast on Das Erste as well as online via ARD's official website daserste.de.

Song	Songwriter(s)
"A Good Day"	Audra Mae, Todd Wright, Scott Simons
"A Million and One"	Errol Rennalls, Stavros Ioannou
"At All"	Aloe Blacc
"Good News"	Audra Mae, Ferras Alqaisi
"I Like You"	Rosi Golan, Johnny McDaid
"Mama Told Me"	Stefan Raab, Lena Meyer-Landrut
"Maybe"	Daniel Schaub, Pär Lammers
"Push Forward"	Daniel Schaub, Pär Lammers
"Taken by a Stranger"	Gus Seyffert, Nicole Morier, Monica Birkenes
"Teenage Girls"	Viktoria Hansen, Lili Tarkow-Reinisch, Yacíne Azeggagh
"That Again"	Stefan Raab
"What Happened to Me"	Lena Meyer-Landrut, Stefan Raab

==== Semi-finals ====
The two televised semi-finals took place on 31 January and 7 February 2011. In each semi-final Lena performed six of the participating songs and top three songs were selected solely through public televoting, including options for landline and SMS voting, to proceed to the final. Stefan Raab alongside two music experts provided feedback in regards to the songs during both semi-finals. The experts for the first semi-final were singers Der Graf and Stefanie Kloß, while the experts for the second semi-final were comedian, actress and Eurovision Song Contest 2011 co-presenter Anke Engelke and singer-songwriter Joy Denalane.

Semi-final 1 – 31 January 2011
R/O	Song	Result
1	"Good News"	—N/a
2	"Maybe"	Advanced
3	"I Like You"	—N/a
4	"That Again"	—N/a
5	"Taken by a Stranger"	Advanced
6	"What Happened to Me"	Advanced

Semi-final 2 – 7 February 2011
R/O	Song	Result
1	"A Million and One"	Advanced
2	"Teenage Girls"	—N/a
3	"Push Forward"	Advanced
4	"At All"	—N/a
5	"A Good Day"	—N/a
6	"Mama Told Me"	Advanced

==== Final ====
The televised final took place on 18 February 2011. The winning song was selected through two rounds of public televoting, including options for landline and SMS voting. In the first round of voting, the top two songs were selected to proceed to the second round. In the second round, the winning song, "Taken by a Stranger", was selected. Stefan Raab and two music experts provided feedback in regards to the songs during the final. The experts were presenter and singer Barbara Schöneberger and musician Adel Tawil. In addition to the performances of the competing songs, Adel Tawil performed his new song "Hilf mir".

First Round – 18 February 2011
R/O	Song	Result
1	"Maybe"	—N/a
2	"What Happened to Me"	—N/a
3	"Push Forward"	Advanced
4	"Mama Told Me"	—N/a
5	"A Million and One"	—N/a
6	"Taken by a Stranger"	Advanced

Second Round – 18 February 2011
R/O	Song	Televote	Place
1	"Push Forward"	21%	2
2	"Taken by a Stranger"	79%	1

==== Ratings ====
Viewing figures by show
Show	Date	Viewing figures		Ref.
Show	Date	Nominal	Share	Ref.
Semi-final 1	31 January 2011	2,560,000	7.9%	
Semi-final 2	7 February 2011	1,820,000	5.5%	
Final	18 February 2011	3,250,000	10.1%	

== At Eurovision ==
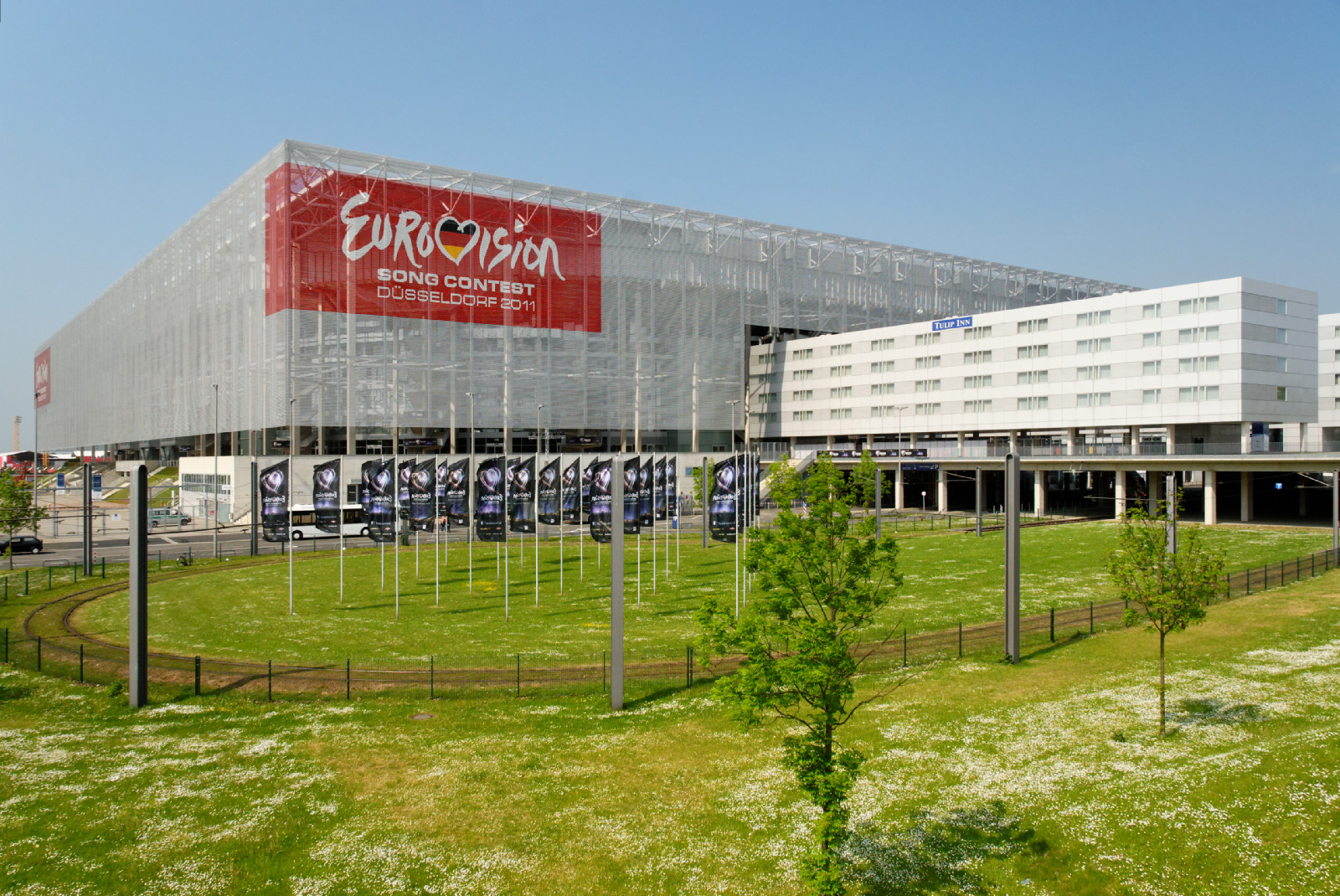
Espirit Arena, host venue of the 2011 contest.

According to Eurovision rules, all nations with the exceptions of the host country and the "Big Five" (France, Germany, Italy, Spain and the United Kingdom) are required to qualify from one of two semi-finals in order to compete for the final; the top ten countries from each semi-final progress to the final. As the host country and a member of the "Big Five", Germany automatically qualified to compete in the final on 14 May 2011. In addition to their participation in the final, Germany is also required to broadcast and vote in one of the two semi-finals. During the semi-final allocation draw on 17 January 2011, Germany was assigned to broadcast and vote in the second semi-final on 12 May 2011.

In Germany, the first semi-final was broadcast on Einsfestival and ProSieben with commentary by Peter Urban and Steven Gätjen, while the second semi-final and the final were broadcast on Das Erste with commentary by Peter Urban. ARD also broadcast the final on NDR 2, WDR 1LIVE, hr3 with commentary by Thomas Mohr, Steffi Neu and Tim Frühling. The final was watched by 13.93 million viewers in Germany, which meant a market share of 49.4 per cent. NDR appointed Ina Müller as its spokesperson to announce the top 12-point score awarded by the German votes during the final.

=== Final ===
Lena took part in technical rehearsals on 7 and 8 May, followed by dress rehearsals on 13 and 14 May. This included the jury final on 13 May where the professional juries of each country watched and voted on the competing entries. As the host nation, Germany's running order position in the final was decided through another draw on 15 March 2011. Germany was drawn to perform in position 16. While Germany had already been drawn to perform in position 16, it was determined following the second semi-final winners' press conference that Germany would perform following Moldova and before the entry from Romania.

The German performance featured Lena performing on stage in a black costume with five dancers, two of them which also performed backing vocals, in silver suits covering all of their body apart from their faces. The stage began with a dark background which later transitioned to a white background with blue and white spotlights, creating the shape of an hourglass and a pyramid-like effect. The LED screens first displayed turning rectangles, later changing to duplicated images of one of the backing vocalists and lastly a breaking glass when the corresponding sound appeared on the half playback of the song. Germany placed tenth in the final, scoring 107 points.

=== Voting ===
Voting during the three shows consisted of 50 percent public televoting and 50 percent from a jury deliberation. The jury consisted of five music industry professionals who were citizens of the country they represent. This jury was asked to judge each contestant based on: vocal capacity; the stage performance; the song's composition and originality; and the overall impression by the act. In addition, no member of a national jury could be related in any way to any of the competing acts in such a way that they cannot vote impartially and independently.

Following the release of the full split voting by the EBU after the conclusion of the competition, it was revealed that Germany had placed ninth with the public televote and tenth with the jury vote in the final. In the public vote, Germany scored 113 points and in the jury vote the nation scored 104 points.

Below is a breakdown of points awarded to Germany and awarded by Germany in the second semi-final and grand final of the contest. The nation awarded its 12 points to Austria in the semi-final and the final of the contest.

==== Points awarded to Germany ====
Points awarded to Germany (Final)
Score	Country
12 points	
10 points	Austria
8 points	Belarus; Denmark; Latvia; Switzerland
7 points	Netherlands; Slovenia
6 points	Iceland; Italy; Sweden
5 points	Belgium; Norway
4 points	Greece; Poland
3 points	Bosnia and Herzegovina; France; Spain; Turkey
2 points	Lithuania
1 point	Croatia

==== Points awarded by Germany ====
Points awarded by Germany (Semi-final 2)
Score	Country
12 points	Austria
10 points	Denmark
8 points	Ireland
7 points	Bosnia and Herzegovina
6 points	Romania
5 points	Moldova
4 points	Bulgaria
3 points	Slovenia
2 points	Cyprus
1 point	Sweden

Points awarded by Germany (Final)
Score	Country
12 points	Austria
10 points	Greece
8 points	Ireland
7 points	Bosnia and Herzegovina
6 points	Denmark
5 points	Russia
4 points	Moldova
3 points	Italy
2 points	Finland
1 point	Slovenia

==== Split results from Germany ====
Points awarded by Germany (Final)
Score	Televote	Jury
12 points	Greece	Austria
10 points	Bosnia and Herzegovina	Denmark
8 points	Russia	Finland
7 points	Austria	Slovenia
6 points	Ireland	Italy
5 points	Sweden	Ireland
4 points	Moldova	Moldova
3 points	United Kingdom	Hungary
2 points	Italy	United Kingdom
1 point	France	Estonia
