= Skinny (band) =

English electronica band

- Origin: London, England
- Genres: Alternative rock, electronica, trip hop, alternative dance
- Years active: 1996–2001
- Labels: Cheeky; Polygram; BMG
- Members: Mathew Benbrook; Paul Herman; Dave Nally; Tim Vogt

Skinny were an English electronica band which released two albums over the course of four years. Their most successful song, "Failure", was included on both albums.

== History ==
In 1996, drummer and programmer Mathew Benbrook and guitarist/singer Paul Herman first met in India, where they discovered they shared similar interests. After another coincidental encounter in London and finding out that both of them were musicians, they decided to form a band together.

They were signed to Rollo Armstrong's label, Cheeky Records, in 1998. In 2001, the remix of the title Morning Light was featured on the music sampler of the Café del Mar.

The band split up in 2001, leaving the name with Benbrook who continues to make music under it. Benbrook also worked as songwriter with other musicians, such as Paolo Nutini (New Shoes) and Lena Meyer-Landrut (Neon (Lonely People)).

== Discography ==
=== Albums ===
- The Weekend (1998)
- Taller (2001)

=== Singles ===
- "Failure" (1998) – UK No. 31
- "Friday (Going Out)" (1999)
- "Coming Up Roses" (2001)
- "Morning Light" (2001)
- "Sweet Thing" (2001)
