= Hessische/Niedersächsische Allgemeine =

Regional newspaper published in Kassel, Germany

- City: Kassel
- Country: Germany
- Website: www.hna.de

Hessische/Niedersächsische Allgemeine (HNA) is a regional newspaper published in Kassel, Germany. Since 1 March 2017, the paper has been owned by Verlag Dierichs GmbH.

The average circulation of HNA in 2008 was 165,800 copies, having fallen from 247,500 copies in 1999.
