= Loyal to Myself =

Studio album by Lena
- Released: 31 May 2024
- Genre: Pop; Indie pop; Folk-Pop; Alternative pop
- Length: 43:34
- Label: Polydor

Lena chronology
Only Love, L (2019)	Loyal to Myself (2024)

Singles from Loyal to Myself
- 1. "Strip" Released: 4 June 2021; 2. "Looking for Love" Released: 23 June 2022; 3. "What I Want" Released: 16 June 2023; 4. "Straitjacket" Released: 27 October 2023; 5. "Loyal to Myself" Released: 15 March 2024

Loyal to Myself is the sixth studio album by German singer Lena Meyer-Landrut. It was released by Polydor Records on 31 May 2024.

== Critical reception ==
Professional ratings
Review scores
Source	Rating
laut.de	3/5 stars

laut.de editor Kai Butterweck found that "Lena's pop is tame and doesn't hurt. You won't find a great anthem or a real hit. But maybe that's not the point. Loyal to Myself is not an album that will freak out the masses. It's a record that you can listen to at home if you're a fan of rock-solid pop music."

== Chart performance ==
Loyal to Myself debuted at number five on the German Albums Chart in the week of 7 June 2024.

== Track listing ==
Loyal to Myself track listing
No.	Title	Writer(s)	Producer(s)	Length
1.	"Let Me Dream"	Lena Meyer-Landrut; Nicolas Rebscher; Sophie Simmons	Rebscher	1:06
2.	"Loyal to Myself"	Meyer-Landrut; Rebscher; Sam Merrifield; Hannah Wilson	Rebscher	2:28
3.	"Brown Blue Eyes"	Meyer-Landrut; Tobias Kuhn; Philipp Steinke	Pascal "Kalli" Reinhardt	3:01
4.	"Right Reasons"	Meyer-Landrut; Joe Walter; Michael Geldreich; Simmons	Rebscher; Geldreich	3:02
5.	"First Love"	Meyer-Landrut; Walter; Geldreich; Simmons	Thomas Thurner; Geldreich	2:50
6.	"See You Later"	Meyer-Landrut; Geldreich; Simmons	Reinhardt; Maarten Paul	2:53
7.	"Run Charlie"	Meyer-Landrut; Rebscher; Simmons	Rebscher	2:39
8.	"I Miss You"	Meyer-Landrut; Dewain Whitmore, Jr.; Sofia Quinn; Teal Douville	Reinhardt; Douville	2:42
9.	"Good Again"	Meyer-Landrut; Rebscher; Simmons	Rebscher; Nikolai Potthoff	2:47
10.	"Unbreakable"	Meyer-Landrut; Rebscher; Simmons	Rebscher	2:51
11.	"Mean Girls"	Meyer-Landrut; Rebscher; Simmons	Rebscher; Miksu; Barsky; Sizzy	2:22
12.	"Drug Worth Doing"	Meyer-Landrut; Alex Schwartz; Casey Smith; Jake Torrey; Joe Khajadourian; Potthoff	Potthoff; The Futuristics	2:44
13.	"Lass mich träumen"	Meyer-Landrut	Rebscher	1:04

Bonus tracks
No.	Title	Writer(s)	Producer(s)	Length
14.	"Strip"	Meyer-Landrut; Rebscher; Simmons	Rebscher; Yannick Ernst	2:47
15.	"Looking for Love"	Meyer-Landrut; Beatgees; Yanek Stärk; David Vogt; Walter	Beatgees; Stärk	2:40
16.	"What I Want"	Meyer-Landrut; Reinhardt; Walter	Reinhardt	2:50
17.	"Straitjacket"	Meyer-Landrut; Hailey Collier; Nikolay Mohr; Sophia Brenan	Mohr	2:40
Total length:				43:34

== Charts ==
Weekly chart performance for Loyal to Myself
Chart (2024)	Peak position
Austrian Albums (Ö3 Austria)	7
German Albums (Offizielle Top 100)	5
Swiss Albums (Schweizer Hitparade)	78

== Release history ==
Loyal to Myself release history
Region	Date	Format(s)	Label	Ref.
Various	31 May 2024	CD; digital download; streaming	Polydor	
