= Thank You (Lena Meyer-Landrut song) =

Single by Lena

from the album Only Love, L
- Released: 16 November 2018
- Recorded: 2017
- Genre: Pop
- Length: 3:14
- Label: Universal Music Group
- Songwriter(s): Beatgees; Fraser T. Smith; Janee Bennett; Jessica Glynne; Meyer-Landrut; Simon Triebel

Lena singles chronology
"If I Wasn't Your Daughter" (2017)	"Thank You" (2018)	"Don't Lie to Me" (2019)

"Thank You" is a song performed by German singer Lena Meyer-Landrut. The song was released as a digital download on 16 November 2018 as the lead single from her fifth studio album Only Love, L (2019). The song peaked at number 40 on the German Singles Chart.

== Music video ==
A music video to accompany the release of "Thank You" was first released onto YouTube on 29 November 2018. It was directed by Mario Clement.

== Track listing ==
Digital download
No.	Title	Length
1.	"Thank You"	3:14

== Charts ==
Chart (2018–19)	Peak position
Austria (Ö3 Austria Top 40)	50
Germany (GfK)	40

== Certifications ==
Region	Certification	Certified units/sales
Germany (BVMI)	Gold	200,000^{‡}
^{‡} Sales+streaming figures based on certification alone.

== Release history ==
Region	Date	Format	Label
Germany	November 2018	Digital download	Universal Music Group
