= Taken by a Stranger =

2011 single by Lena

Single by Lena

from the album Good News
- B-side: "That Again" (CD single)
- Released: 22 February 2011
- Genre: Electropop
- Length: 3:25 (single version); 3:02 (Eurovision version)
- Label: We Love Music
- Songwriters: Gus Seyffert; Nicole Morier; Monica Birkenes
- Producers: Stefan Raab; Reinhard Schaub

Lena singles chronology
"Touch a New Day" (2010)	"Taken by a Stranger" (2011)	"What a Man" (2011)

Music video
- "Taken by a Stranger" on YouTube

Audio sample
- file; help

Eurovision Song Contest 2011 entry
- Country: Germany
- Artist: Lena Meyer-Landrut
- As: Lena
- Language: English

Finals performance
- Final result: 10th
- Final points: 107

Entry chronology
- ◄ "Satellite" (2010)
- "Standing Still" (2012) ►

Official performance video
- "Taken by a Stranger" (final) on YouTube

"Taken by a Stranger" is a song recorded by German singer Lena for her second studio album Good News (2011), released as a CD single on 22 February 2011 by We Love Music. Gus Seyffert, Nicole Morier and Monica Birkenes wrote the song, while production was handled by Stefan Raab and Reinhard Schaub. Seyffert had originally penned the track for Birkenes to record, but her label rejected it and it was eventually given to Lena. Musically, "Taken by a Stranger" is a 1980s and grufti-influenced electropop song characterized by synthesizer sounds. Lyrically, it revolves around the connection between two strangers. While compared to the works of English band The Cure by one reviewer, other speculated lyrical themes were sadomasochism, psychosexual development, kidnapping and sexual fantasy.

The track represented Germany in the Eurovision Song Contest 2011 after winning the pre-selection show Unser Song für Deutschland. Lena had represented the country at Eurovision one year earlier, winning the contest. In Düsseldorf, the singer finished in tenth place with a total of 107 points. During her show, Lena performed on a dark stage enhanced with light rays. She wore a black outfit and heavy make-up, accompanied by background dancers and backing vocalists sporting silver body suits. Her performance was well received by publications that noted its sexual elements.

Music critics gave the song mixed reviews, praising its unusual style and picking it as a highlight in the contest, but also criticizing its lack of catchiness. Several publications pointed out that the recording was a departure from Lena's past good girl public image. At the 2011 1Live Krone Awards, "Taken by a Stranger" was nominated in the Best Single category. Commercially the track fared moderately on record charts reaching number two in Germany and peaking within the top 50 in Austria, Switzerland and Ireland. Its promotion consisted of various live performances, as well as the release of an accompanying music video on 24 February 2011. Filmed in Berlin by Wolf Gresenz, it portrays Lena involved in various activities in a hotel room. In 2012, the visual was nominated for an Echo in the Best Video National category. "Taken by a Stranger" has been covered by acts such as German group The BossHoss.

== Background and release ==
Gus Seyffert, Nicole Morier and Monica Birkenes wrote "Taken by a Stranger", while Stefan Raab and Reinhard Schaub handled its production. The song was originally penned by Seyffert in 2010 for Birkenes to record for a new studio album, but her label rejected it and eventually gave it to Lena. In an interview, Seyffert spoke of the song's development: "[Morier and I] squatted together and came up with a tempo and some chords to sing along to. We programmed a beat and I recorded a fast bass and guitar track. Then we took turns singing our melody ideas. When we finally had a tune, we began writing the lyrics." We Love Music released "Taken by a Stranger" as a CD single on 22 February 2011 in Germany. UMG made it available for digital download in various countries later in 2011. With a length of three minutes and twenty-five seconds on its initial release, the song was shortened to three minutes and two seconds to comply with Eurovision's contest rules and to enable Lena's participation.

== Composition and lyrical interpretation ==
"Taken by a Stranger" has been described as a "sombre", "mystical" and "mysterious" 1980s and grufti-influenced electropop song characterized by synthesizer sounds. It is composed in a 4/4 metre, with its instrumentation consisting of "weird, spooky and confusing" sounds. An editor of German website Eurovision.de likened "Taken by a Stranger" to the material released by English band The Cure. Christina Rietz, writing for Die Zeit, noted the lyrics' complexity and called the song a "sado-hymn". The Guardian's Andrew Khan considered the recording a "wild-eyed piece of psychosexual drama".

Lyrically, "Taken by a Stranger" revolves around a male and a female who have come close to each other. The man wants to pursue a relationship but the woman leaves. Seyffert spoke of the song's lyrical message: "We decided on a story of a stranger, who seems a little threatening, or to whom the singer might become threatening. I think it is about expressing a fantasy to be together with a stranger." The Guardian speculated that "Taken by a Stranger" dealt with kidnapping. During the track's "mysterious" refrain, Lena sings several clipped sentences that cross rhyme: "Taken by a stranger/Stranger things are starting to begin/Lured into the danger/Trip me up and spin me round again." Lena sings selected words in the chorus in a way that matches the accentuation of two beats in the song's 4/4 metre. Masen Abou-Dakn, then-lecturer at the University of Popular Music and Music Business in Mannheim, praised the song's hook as "[one] on which the listener gets stuck". He felt the mention of chairs and blindfolding in the song supports his view that it discusses sexual fantasy.

== Reception and accolades ==
"Taken by a Stranger" received mixed reviews from music critics. Tilmann Aretz of n-tv praised the song's power and picked it as one of his highlights on Unser Song für Deutschland. Sebastian Leber, writing for Der Tagesspiegel, praised the track for being "unusually modern" and predicted it would stand out among several uptempo songs at Eurovision. German actress Barbara Schöneberger and singer Adel Tawil, along with several publications, noted that "Taken by a Stranger" contradicted Lena's previous good girl public image. In a mixed review, Bild called "Taken by a Stranger" a great "electropop-hymn" but criticized its lack of a catchy melody. Vebooboo Nadella from Wiwibloggs criticized the song's long build-up to the refrain and questioned whether it would impress voters at Eurovision. At the 2011 1Live Krone Awards, "Taken by a Stranger" was nominated in the Best Single category.

Commercially, the track fared moderately on record charts. It debuted and peaked at number two in Germany in March 2011, lasting for 16 consecutive weeks on the chart. In Austria, "Taken by a Stranger" opened the Ö3 Austria Top 40 chart at number 32, eventually reaching its peak position at number 18 in May 2011; it spent eight weeks in the ranking. The song also peaked within the top 30 in Switzerland, the top 50 in Ireland and the top 100 in the Netherlands. In Belgium, "Taken by a Stranger" failed to enter the Ultratop chart in the Flanders and Wallonia regions, instead reaching the top 40 on the Ultratip extension in both territories.

== Promotion and other usage ==
An accompanying music video for "Taken by a Stranger" premiered on ARD on 24 February 2011, and was later uploaded to MySpassde's YouTube channel on 2 March 2011. Wolf Gresnz filmed it in Berlin, Germany. The video begins with a mirror breaking; Lena picks up the keys for a hotel room from its shards. Entering the room, the singer dances and looks around "grumpily". Following this, she gets ready in front of the bathroom mirror and "wrestles" with her reflection. The music video ends with Lena jumping into a mirror that breaks, with her disappearing. Scenes are interspersed throughout the clip's main plot, showing female background dancers wearing silver bodysuits, as well as the singer lying on a bed with a pug in her hands. At the 2012 Echo Awards, the video was nominated in the Best Video National category. "Taken by a Stranger" was promoted through several live performances. German group The BossHoss covered the song in a rock version during the fourth season of the German reality television series Sing meinen Song – Das Tauschkonzert (2017).

== At Eurovision ==
=== National selection ===
After Lena won the Eurovision Song Contest 2010 with her song "Satellite", the Norddeutscher Rundfunk (NDR) confirmed that she would represent Germany a second time and opened a submission period for composers to submit their entries. Lena's song for Eurovision was selected by public televoting during Unser Song für Deutschland, which consisted of two semi-finals, one final and the super final. "Taken by a Stranger" qualified from the first semi-final on 31 January 2011 with three other songs. It advanced to the super final from the final on 18 February 2011 alongside "Push Forward". "Taken by a Stranger" was ultimately selected as Germany's entry for the Eurovision Song Contest 2011 after receiving 79% of the televotes in the super final.

=== In Düsseldorf ===
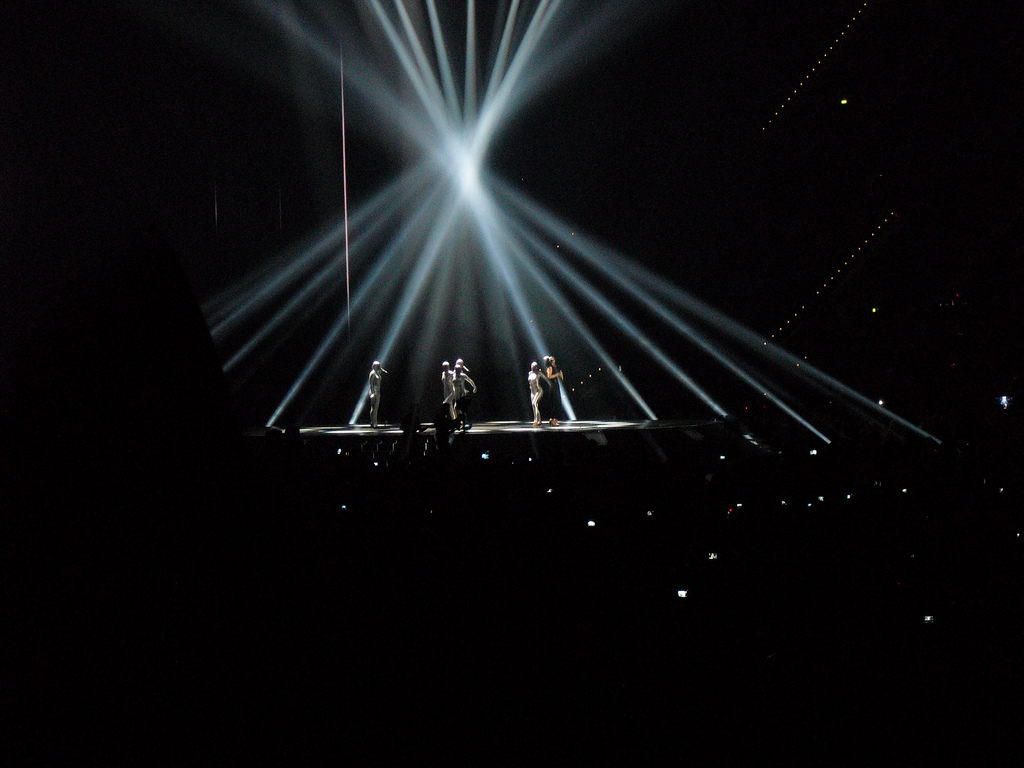
A screenshot of Lena's show at Eurovision. She performs on a dark stage in a "temple of white rays of light".

The Eurovision Song Contest 2011 took place at the Esprit Arena in Düsseldorf, Germany, and consisted of two semi-finals on 10 and 12 May, and the final on 14 May 2011. According to Eurovision rules all participating countries, except the host country and the "Big Five" (France, Germany, Italy, Spain, and the United Kingdom), were required to qualify from one semi-final to compete in the final; the top ten countries from their respective semi-final progressed to the final. There, Lena performed 16th, preceded by Moldova and followed by Romania.

During her show, Lena sang "Taken by a Stranger" on a dark stage in a "temple of white rays of light", sporting a black outfit and "skyscraper-high" high heels. She wore heavy make-up and had smoky eyes. Two female backing vocalists and three female background dancers accompanied the singer, each sporting silver elastic body suits. TV Today praised Lena's performance, noting her "most erotic hip swings" and "her lascivious look". An editor at Eurovision.de lauded the singer's facial expressions, feeling they enhanced the song's impact. Oberösterreichische Nachrichten noted Lena's sex appeal, while The Guardian compared her stage show to ones conducted by English singers Kate Nash and Cheryl. The newspaper likened the background dancers' outfits to those worn by Norwegian band Hole in the Wall. In her book Performing the 'New' Europe, Karen Fricker wrote that Lena portrayed a femme fatale, comparing her sexualized appearance to German playwright Frank Wedekind 1895 Lulu play series.

Below is a breakdown of points awarded to Germany in the Grand Final of the contest. The country finished in tenth place with a total of 107 points, including ten awarded by Austria, and eight from Belarus, Denmark, Latvia and Switzerland. Overall, Germany came ninth by the public televote with 113 points and tenth by the juries with 104 points.

Points awarded to Germany (Final)
12 points	10 points	8 points	7 points	6 points
	Austria	Belarus; Denmark; Latvia; Switzerland	Netherlands; Slovenia	Iceland; Italy; Sweden
5 points	4 points	3 points	2 points	1 point
Belgium; Norway	Greece; Poland	Bosnia and Herzegovina; France; Spain; Turkey	Lithuania	Croatia

== Track listing ==
- German CD single
1. "Taken by a Stranger" (Single Version) – 3:25
2. "That Again" – 3:03
- Digital download
1. "Taken by a Stranger" (Single Version) – 3:23
2. "Taken by a Stranger" (Live) – 3:24

== Charts ==
=== Weekly charts ===
Chart (2011)	Peak position
Austria (Ö3 Austria Top 40)	18
Belgium (Ultratip Bubbling Under Flanders)	24
Belgium (Ultratip Bubbling Under Wallonia)	39
Germany (Official German Charts)	2
Ireland (IRMA)	50
Netherlands (Single Top 100)	92
Switzerland (Schweizer Hitparade)	29
United Kingdom (Official Charts Company)	117

=== Year-end charts ===
Chart (2011)	Position
Germany (Official German Charts)	69

== Release history ==
Region	Date	Format	Label
Germany	22 February 2011	CD single	We Love Music
Various	N/A 2011	Digital download	UMG
