= Traffic Lights (Lena Meyer-Landrut song) =

Single by Lena

from the album Crystal Sky
- B-side: "We Roam"
- Released: 1 May 2015
- Length: 2:46
- Label: Universal Music Germany
- Songwriters: Hayley Aitken; Alexander James; Harry Sommerdahl
- Producers: Beatgees; Biffco

Lena singles chronology
"Mr. Arrow Key" (2013)	"Traffic Lights" (2015)	"Wild & Free" (2015)

Music video
- "Traffic Lights" on YouTube

"Traffic Lights" is a song by German recording artist Lena Meyer-Landrut. It was written by Hayley Aitken, Alexander James and Harry Sommerdahl and produced by production teams Beatgees and Biffco for her fourth studio album, Crystal Sky (2015). The song was released by Universal Music Germany as the album's lead single on 1 May 2015. The remix EP followed on 12 June 2015.

== Track listing ==
CD single
No.	Title	Writer(s)	Producer(s)	Length
1.	"Traffic Lights"	Alex James; Harry Sommerdahl; Hayley Aitken	Biffco; Beatgees	2:46
2.	"We Roam"	Meyer-Landrut; Beatgees; Samuelsen; Katrina Noorbergen	Biffco; Beatgees	3:47

Remix EP
No.	Title	Length
1.	"Traffic Lights" (Maywald Remix)	5:54
2.	"Traffic Lights" (Pharfar Remix)	3:20
3.	"Traffic Lights" (Dragonman Mix)	3:39
4.	"Traffic Lights" (DIA Remix)	5:22
5.	"Traffic Lights" (Mike Vamp Remix)	5:32

== Charts ==
=== Weekly charts ===
Weekly chart performance for "Traffic Lights"
Chart (2015)	Peak position
Austria (Ö3 Austria Top 40)	52
Belgium (Ultratip Bubbling Under Flanders)	67
Germany (GfK)	14

=== Year-end charts ===
Year-end chart performance for "Traffic Lights"
Chart (2015)	Position
Germany (Official German Charts)	69

== Certifications ==
Certifications for "Traffic Lights"
Region	Certification	Certified units/sales
Germany (BVMI)	Gold	200,000^{‡}
^{‡} Sales+streaming figures based on certification alone.

== Release history ==
"Traffic Lights" release history
Region	Date	Format(s)	Label	Ref.
Germany	March 10, 2015	Mainstream contemporary hit radio	Universal	
Germany	May 1, 2015	Digital download – Single	Universal	
Poland	June 17, 2015	Airplay	Universal	
