= Good News (Lena album) =

Studio album by Lena
- Released: 8 February 2011
- Length: 38:40
- Label: Universal
- Producers: Stefan Raab; Reinhard Schaub

Lena chronology
| My Cassette Player (2010) | Good News (2011) | Stardust (2012) |

Singles from Good News
- 1. "Taken by a Stranger" Released: 22 February 2011; 2. "Who'd Want to Find Love" Released: 15 July 2011

Good News is the second studio album released by German singer Lena Meyer-Landrut. It was released by Universal Music on 8 February 2011 in German-speaking Europe, following her win of the Eurovision Song Contest in 2010. The album includes all songs Meyer-Landrut performed during the televised preselection process for the song that she would perform at the 2011 contest to defend her title. Recorded within five weeks only, she reteamed with mentor, entertainer Stefan Raab, to work on the majority of the album.

The album earned largely positive reviews from music critics who praised relaxed nature and called it an enjoyable and likable listen. As with its predecessor, Good News became Meyer-Landrut's second album to debut at number one on the German Albums Chart. It also reached the top ten in Austria and the top 20 in Switzerland, but was commercially less successful elsewhere. In fall 2011, the album was certified Platinum by the Bundesverband Musikindustrie (BVMI).

== Background ==
After Meyer-Landrut won the Eurovision Song Contest 2010 with her song "Satellite", the Norddeutscher Rundfunk (NDR) confirmed that she would represent Germany a second time and opened a submission period for composers to submit their entries. Meyer-Landrut's song for Eurovision was selected by public televoting during Unser Song für Deutschland, which consisted of two semi-finals, one final and the super final. Good News all the songs Meyer-Landrut performed during the show.

More than 600 songs were sent to Meyer-Landrut and Raab as possible entries. Some songwriters who had previously collaborated with Lena on her debut album My Cassette Player entered songs for the contest, such as Daniel Schaub, Pär Lammers and Rosi Golan. A number of other songwriters also entered compositions, including Nicole Morier (who previously worked with Britney Spears and Tom Jones), Erroll Rennalls and Aloe Blacc. Lena and Raab also collaborated to write two songs for the album: "What Happened to Me" and "Mama Told Me". The field of songs was reduced from over six-hundred to twelve, all of which feature on Good News. The production of all songs began in December 2010. The album cover was shot by Sandra Ludewig and the booklet was designed by Berlin design firm Eat, Sleep + Design.

== Promotion ==
"Taken by a Stranger" qualified from the first semi-final on 31 January 2011 with three other songs. It advanced to the super final from the final on 18 February 2011 alongside "Push Forward". "Taken by a Stranger" was ultimately selected as Germany's entry for the Eurovision Song Contest 2011 after receiving 79% of the televotes in the super final. It was released as Meyer-Landrut's next single as well as Good News's first single on 22 February 2011. The song debuted at number two on the German Singles Chart and also debuted on the Austrian and Swiss Singles Charts at numbers 32 and 45, respectively. Four additional tracks from the album appeared on the German Singles Chart following their performance on Unser Song für Deutschland: Runner-up "Push Forward" charted at number 15; "Maybe" entered at number 53; "A Million and One" at 55; and "Mama Told Me" at 58.

A platinum edition of Good News was released on 16 September 2011. It includes two previously unreleased tracks, including Ellie Goulding-penned "Who'd Want to Find Love" and the Salt-n-Pepa cover "What a Man," which Meyer-Landrut had recorded for Matthias Schweighöfer's romantic comedy film What a Man (2011) and been released as a single earlier in September. The reissue also included five live versions from the Meyer-Landrut's 2011 Good News Tour: "Satellite", "Taken by a Stranger", "Good News", "New Shoes" and "I Like to Bang My Head".

== Critical reception ==
Professional ratings
Review scores
| Source | Rating |
|---|---|
| AllMusic | 3.5/5 stars |
| CDStarts.de | 7/10 stars |
| Laut.de | 3/5 stars |

Good News earned largely positive reviews from music critics. AllMusic editor Christian Genzel rated the album three out of five stars. He found that "Given the time pressure, the new album's most surprising characteristic is how relaxed it feels – especially Lena herself, who sounds comfortable and assured, without any indication that she's trying to prove something. Her charm manages to carry an album of pop songs that are as fluffy as pop songs have any right to be: her down-to-earth persona and her unaffected singing – a refreshing break from the showmanship of technically proficient, but personality-free voices that are so common in the charts – make Good News an enjoyable and likable listen."

Jan Feddersen from Die Tageszeitung described the album as "good music. Well-produced. A piece of pop with an international flavor. A state of the art of the genre, which goes far beyond the aesthetic silliness of Nena [...] and can also be exported as German pop beyond Rammstein, Scooter and Scorpions. It's an album for modern coffee houses, background music that is at the same time too mysterious for department store elevators. All songs come without pretension, appear pleasantly sparsely arranged, and are adequately conveyed vocally by the singer." Laut.de critic Michael Schuh wrote that while "you won't find any corners and edges [...] in the sound design of this once again comfortable, safe production [...] Good News should easily withstand the high expectations after its box office hit debut." Matthias Reichel from CDStarts.de noted that "Lena has developed further vocally and has toned down her self-made English accent." He felt that while the album "doesn’t include a second "Satellite," the song selection does justice to an album character."

== Commercial performance ==
Good News was released on 8 February 2011 after all the songs had been revealed during the two semi-finals of the national selection process. In the week of 18 February 2011, it debuted at number one on the German Albums Chart. In its second week the album dropped to number two in the German charts following the release of Roxette's Charm School (2011) – only to return to the top in its third week on the chart. Also in its second week of release, the album was certified Gold by the Bundesverband Musikindustrie (BVMI) for sales of over 100,000 copies. In Austria, Good News debuted at number eight but eventually peaked at number seven. In Switzerland, it debuted on the chart at number 27, before rising the following week to number fifteen.

== Track listing ==
Good News track listing
| No. | Title | Writer(s) | Producer(s) | Length |
|---|---|---|---|---|
| 1. | "Good News" | Audra Mae; Ferras Alqaisi | Stefan Raab; Reinhard Schaub | 3:05 |
| 2. | "What Happened to Me" | Lena Meyer-Landrut; Raab | Raab | 3:37 |
| 3. | "A Million and One" | Erroll Rennalls; Stavros Ioannou | Raab; Schaub | 3:11 |
| 4. | "Maybe" | Daniel Schaub; Pär Lammers | Raab; Schaub | 3:06 |
| 5. | "I Like You" | Rosi Golan; Johnny McDaid | Raab | 2:51 |
| 6. | "Mama Told Me" | Meyer-Landrut; Raab | Raab | 2:51 |
| 7. | "Push Forward" | Daniel Schaub; Pär Lammers | Raab; Schaub | 3:37 |
| 8. | "A Good Day" | Mae; Todd Wright; Scott Simons | Raab; Schaub | 3:19 |
| 9. | "Taken by a Stranger" | Gus Seyffert; Nicole Morier; Monica Birkenes | Raab; Schaub | 3:24 |
| 10. | "Teenage Girls" | Viktoria Hansen; Lili Tarkow-Reinisch; Yacine Azeggagh | Raab | 3:13 |
| 11. | "That Again" | Raab | Raab | 3:03 |
| 12. | "At All" | Aloe Blacc | Raab | 3:21 |
| Total length: | | | | 38:40 |

Platinum edition – bonus tracks
| No. | Title | Writer(s) | Producer(s) | Length |
|---|---|---|---|---|
| 13. | "What a Man" | Dave Crawford | Raab | 2:54 |
| 14. | "Who'd Want to Find Love" | Ellie Goulding; Jonny Lattimer | Raab; Schaub | 2:57 |
| 15. | "I Like to Bang My Head" (Live) | Meyer-Landrut; Raab | Raab | 4:29 |
| 16. | "Good News" (Live) | Mae; Alqaisi | Raab; Schaub | 3:24 |
| 17. | "Taken by a Stranger" (Live) | Seyffert; Morier; Birkenes | Raab; Schaub | 3:37 |
| 18. | "Satellite" (Live) | Julie Frost; John Gordon | Brix; Ingo Politz; Bernd Wendlandt; Gordon | 4:08 |
| 19. | "New Shoes" (Live) | Matty Benbrook; Jim Duguid; Paolo Nutini | Raab; Schaub | 6:08 |

== Charts ==
=== Weekly charts ===
Weekly chart performance for Good News
| Chart (2011) | Peak position |
|---|---|
| Austrian Albums (Ö3 Austria) | 7 |
| German Albums (Offizielle Top 100) | 1 |
| Swiss Albums (Schweizer Hitparade) | 15 |

=== Year-end charts ===
Year-end chart performance for Good News
| Chart (2011) | Position |
|---|---|
| German Albums (Offizielle Top 100) | 20 |

== Certifications ==
Certifications for Good News
| Region | Certification | Certified units/sales |
|---|---|---|
| Germany (BVMI) | Platinum | 200,000^{^} |
^{^} Shipments figures based on certification alone.

== Release history ==
Good News release history
| Region | Date | Edition(s) | Format(s) | Label | Ref. |
|---|---|---|---|---|---|
| Austria | 8 February 2011 | Standard | CD; digital download | Universal Music | |
| Germany | 8 February 2011 | Standard | CD; digital download | Universal Music | |
| Switzerland | 11 February 2011 | Standard | CD; digital download | Universal Music | |
| United Kingdom | 28 February 2011 | Standard | CD; digital download | Island Records | |
| Europe | 15 May 2011 | Standard | CD; digital download | Universal Music | |
| Various | 16 September 2011 | Platinum | CD; digital download | Universal Music | |
