= If I Wasn't Your Daughter =

Single by Lena
- Released: 6 June 2017
- Length: 3:30
- Label: Lena; Universal
- Songwriter(s): Lena Meyer-Landrut; Vincent Stein; Nico Wellenbrink; Jamie Hartman; Konstantin Scherer

Lena singles chronology
"Lost in You" (2017)	"If I Wasn't Your Daughter" (2017)	"Thank You" (2018)

"If I Wasn't Your Daughter" is a song by German singer Lena Meyer-Landrut. It was written by Meyer-Landrut along with Vincent Stein, Nico Wellenbrink, Jamie Hartman, and Konstantin Scherer. The ballad was released on 6 June 2017, coinciding with its stage premiere on the fourth season of the Sing meinen Song – Das Tauschkonzert, the German version of The Best Singers series.

== Background ==
Lyrically, the song talks about Meyer-Landrut's relationship with her father Ladislas von Karatsony, the son of Andreas Meyer-Landrut, who left the family when she was two years old. Shortly before the Eurovision Song Contest 2010 Lena's father gave an interview with the German tabloid Bild where he stated that he would not come into contact with her yet, but that a place is "always free on [his] table".

== Chart performance ==
Upon Meyer-Landrut's performance on Sing meinen Song – Das Tauschkonzert, "If I Wasn't Your Daughter" temporarily reached the top of the German iTunes Charts. In the week of 9 June 2017, it debuted at number 42 on the German Singles Chart. In its second chart week it reached number 35 on the German Single Charts.

== Music video ==
An accompanying music video for "If I Wasn't Your Daughter" was directed and edited by Vi-Dan Tran. It marked his third collaboration with Meyer-Landrut following his work on "Catapult" und "Home". Filmed at night throughout Berlin-Mitte, including locations such as Potsdamer Platz, it was produced by Max von Helldorff for BNTB-Agency, based on idea by Meyer-Landrut and her stylist Philipp Koch-Verheyen. Khoa Huynh served as a camera assistant, while second camera was handled by Max von Helldorff. The final video premiered online on 6 June 2017.

== Live performances ==
Meyer-Landrut performed the song live for the first time on Sing meinen Song – Das Tauschkonzert on 6 June 2017 in an episode dedicated to her. Her performance received critical acclaim. She also performed the song on Markus Lanz on ZDF on 21 June, to critical acclaim.

== Track listing ==
Digital download
No.	Title	Length
1.	"If I Wasn't Your Daughter" (acoustic version)	3:22

== Charts ==
Weekly chart performance for "If I Wasn't Your Daughter"
Chart (2017)	Peak position
Austria (Ö3 Austria Top 40)	54
Germany (GfK)	35
Switzerland (Schweizer Hitparade)	31

== Release history ==
"If I Wasn't Your Daughter" release history
Region	Date	Format(s)	Label	Ref.
Various	6 June 2017	Digital download	Lena; Universal	
