= Neon (Lonely People) =

Single by Lena

from the album Stardust
- B-side: "Neon (Lonely People) (Beatgees Remix)"
- Released: 22 February 2013 (Download); 15 March 2013 (CD single)
- Recorded: 2013
- Genre: Pop
- Length: 3:32
- Label: Universal Music Domestic Pop
- Songwriter(s): Lena Meyer-Landrut, Mathew Benbrook, Pauline Taylor
- Producer(s): Swen Meyer

Lena singles chronology
"Stardust" (2012)	"Neon (Lonely People)" (2013)	"Mr. Arrow Key" (2013)

"Neon (Lonely People)" is the sixth single by German recording artist Lena Meyer-Landrut. It was released on 15 March 2013. The single version is a faster remix of the version which was previously published on the album Stardust on 12 October 2012.

== Background ==
"Neon (Lonely People)" was written by Meyer-Landrut in collaboration with the British singer-songwriters Mathew Benbrook and Pauline Taylor who previously worked with Paolo Nutini, Dido, or Faithless. The remix was created in early 2013 by Jochen Naaf, a producer from Cologne, who already created remixes of songs by Klee, Polarkreis 18, and Lady Gaga.

Lena performed this song for the first time unplugged during a promotional event in Munich on 30 July 2012 in front of members of the press. The first television presenting was on breakfast television at the broadcasting station Sat.1 on 12 October 2012. The radio premiere of the single version was on 18 January 2013 and the first live performance in front of a large audience was during the television show Unser Song für Malmö in Hanover on 14 February 2013.

In an interview with Universal, Lena described this song as follows:

I think everybody knows that feeling when you are feeling lonely, even though many people are around you. At night at a club, for example. When the whole world appears so full and yet so empty. But then, on the dancefloor, a certain person crosses your path and suddenly the loneliness is gone. That's the point in "Neon". Everything is good when the music starts. Or something like that.

On 22 February 2013, the digital media stores iTunes and Amazon.de offered a new edition of the Stardust album with the single version of Neon (Lonely People).

== Music video ==
The music video was shot in early February 2013 in the Rathenau-Hallen in Berlin. The director was Bode Brodmüller who also directed Lena's Stardust music video in 2012. Premiere was on 1 March 2013. The video is set in an empty warehouse and is showing Lena in different postures, including dancing, lying, standing, and sitting on a swing. Sometimes she is accompanied by female dancers performing some ballet-like moves. Strip lights which are hanging on the ceiling illustrate the titular neon light from the lyrics.

== Track listing ==
CD

No.	Title	Length
1.	"Neon (Lonely People)" (Single Mix)	3:33
2.	"Neon (Lonely People)" (Beatgees Remix)	3:35

Digital download

No.	Title	Length
1.	"Neon (Lonely People)" (Single Mix)	3:32
2.	"Neon (Lonely People)" (Beatgees Remix)	3:36
3.	"Neon (Lonely People)"	3:32
4.	"Neon (Lonely People)" (Yoad Nevo Remix)	3:33
5.	"Neon (Lonely People)" (Video)	3:31

== Charts ==
On 26 March 2013, Neon (Lonely People) made an entry at number 38 in the Media Control singles chart in Germany.

Chart (2013)	Peak position
Germany (GfK)	38
