= Better (Lena Meyer-Landrut and Nico Santos song) =

Single by Lena and Nico Santos
- Released: 16 August 2019
- Length: 3:18
- Label: Universal
- Songwriter(s): Lena Meyer-Landrut; Kate Morgan; Pascal "Kalli" Reinhardt; Joseph Walter; Nico Wellenbrink
- Producer(s): Pascal "Kalli" Reinhardt

Lena singles chronology
"Don't Lie to Me" (2019)	"Better" (2019)	"Skinny Bitch" (2020)

Nico Santos singles chronology
"Unforgettable" (2019)	"Better" (2019)	"Play with Fire" (2019)

"Better" is a song performed by German singers Lena Meyer-Landrut and Nico Santos. It was written by both performers along with Kate Morgan, Joseph Walter, and Pascal "Kalli" Reinhardt, while production was helmed by the latter. The song was released by Universal Music Group as a digital single on 16 August 2019 and peaked at number 15 on the German Singles Chart. "Better" also reached the top 20 in Austria.

== Background ==
The song is about relationships, about how a couple thought they were for each other but it was not meant to be. They sing how their love for each other was not enough and how they wish each other well and how they will not find someone else better.

== Music video ==
A music video to accompany the release of "Better" was first released onto YouTube on 30 August 2019. It was directed by Tatjana Wenig, with Jakub Rzucidlo serving as a co-director.

== Charts ==
=== Weekly charts ===
Weekly chart performance for "Better"
Chart (2019–2020)	Peak position
Austria (Ö3 Austria Top 40)	17
Czech Republic (Rádio – Top 100)	19
Germany (GfK)	15
Germany Airplay (BVMI)	1
Slovakia (Rádio Top 100)	53
Switzerland (Schweizer Hitparade)	89

=== Year-end charts ===
Year-end chart performance for "Better"
Chart (2019)	Position
Austria (Ö3 Austria Top 40)	73
Germany (Official German Charts)	79

== Certifications ==
Certifications for "Better"
Region	Certification	Certified units/sales
Austria (IFPI Austria)	Gold	15,000^{‡}
Germany (BVMI)	Gold	200,000^{‡}
^{‡} Sales+streaming figures based on certification alone.

== Release history ==
"Better" release history
Region	Date	Format(s)	Label	Ref.
Various	16 August 2019	Digital download; streaming	Universal Music Group	
