= Tim Myers =

American musician (born 1984)

- Born: Timothy Myers; November 30, 1984 (age 41)
- Origin: Orange, California, U.S.
- Genres: Pop rock, alternative rock
- Occupations: Musician; singer; songwriter; producer
- Instruments: Vocals; guitar; piano; bass
- Years active: 2007–present
- Formerly of: OneRepublic

Timothy Myers (born November 30, 1984) is an American musician, singer-songwriter, and record producer, best known as a founding member and former bassist of the pop rock band OneRepublic. He is also the founder of the record label Palladium Records.

Myers has written and produced songs for artists including Aloe Blacc, Capital Cities, Barns Courtney, American Authors, Rooney, Kesha, Echosmith, OneRepublic, Welshly Arms, Joy Williams (The Civil Wars), James Arthur, Phillip Phillips, Hailee Steinfeld, Ruelle, Michelle Branch, Five for Fighting, Lenka, and Meiko.

In April 2025, Myers announced his candidacy for the 2026 United States House of Representatives election in California's 41st congressional district as a Democrat, challenging incumbent Republican Ken Calvert. Myers withdrew from the race on July 7, 2025, announcing that he would instead be running for Lieutenant Governor of California in the 2026 election.

== Early life ==
Born and raised in southern California, music has been a presence in Myers' life since an early age. Myers was compelled by piano at five and by age 13, he was introduced to the guitar and bass. Myers soon started writing songs at age 14. His father is a pastor and he was raised singing and playing music in the church.

== Career ==
=== Early musical career ===
In 2002, Myers moved to Los Angeles, California and joined the Interscope/Geffen Records band Limousine. The band was released from their contract within months of beginning work on their debut record.

=== OneRepublic ===
Myers played bass in the pop rock band OneRepublic from 2002 to 2007. In 2002, Myers met OneRepublic founders Ryan Tedder and Tedder's high school classmate Zach Filkins, in Los Angeles. Myers played bass in the band from 2002 to 2007, as well as helped compose several tracks on the debut record, including their Billboard hit "Stop & Stare". After signing a deal with Columbia Records, they recorded a number of songs, only to be dropped by the record label shortly after turning in their record. The band went on to become the number one unsigned band on Myspace and soon got signed to Interscope Records under the Mosley Music Group, headed by Timbaland. The band recorded a full album, Dreaming Out Loud and was released on November 20, 2007, in the United States. Myers co-wrote two songs featured on OneRepublic's second album Waking Up released on November 17, 2009. Myers co-wrote and played on the songs "Sucker Punch" and "Trap Door".

=== Solo career ===
In early 2007, Myers released a solo EP titled Revolution EP. The six-song "Revolution EP" was filled with political anti-war songs. The lyrics call for the need to make positive changes in the turbulent times in which we live. The single "World War" reached #3 on the Triple A radio charts. "A Revolution Song" featured vocals from Colbie Caillat.

On January 7, 2008, Myers released a five-song EP called The Good Life EP. The EP featured the song "The Good Life" which was featured in a Saturn commercial. It was also featured in the TV show Army Wives. His song "Brand New Day" was featured in five unique Target commercials and the song "The Lucky Ones" was used in the Google Chrome campaign. The song "Magic" was featured in the film Water Horse Legend of The Deep. The song "Keep on Keeping on" has been featured in several commercials for Chase; his other song "Simply Wonderful" was used in adverts for Hellmann's mayonnaise from 2010 to 2011. Other songs have been featured in several TV shows including "Entwined" in Grey's Anatomy Season 7, "A Magical Season" Grey's Anatomy Season 6, "Momma's Boy" Grey's Anatomy Season 3, "A New World" Off The Map season 1, "A Place We Used To Know" Army Wives season 1, "Get Together" Suburgatory Season 1, "La La Love" Hart of Dixie Season 1, "Money" Castle Season 3, "Simply Wonderful" Ugly Betty Season 4, "The Lucky Ones" Ugly Betty Season 3, and the movie "Beastly" with his song "Today's The Day".

On February 21, 2012, Myers released his first full-length solo album titled Technicolor. The song "Under Control" was featured in an ad campaign for Chase Bank "Under Control" began climbing up the radio charts debuting on the Hot AC charts at #85, the next week at #74, peaking at #68. The song "Yes!" was featured in an ad campaign for Wendy's that same year and "Life's A Party" was featured in the film "Friends With Benefits" and the video game "Need For Speed."

In 2014, his song "In Spring" was featured in a series of commercials for Rite Aid. He also co-wrote and produced the song "Can't Get Enough" with the artist MoZella featured in the new Chase Bank commercials. His song "Hills To Climb" was featured in promos for the TV show American Dream builders. His song "Young At Heart" was featured in the film and soundtrack for the critically acclaimed film "The Way Way Back." Google did a campaign with his song "Life's Unexpected."

On January 6, 2015, he released his sophomore album The Year which received millions of streams. Within two weeks of release the single "Hills To Climb" received over 2 million streams. He received articles and reviews from LA Times, Billboard Magazine, Spin, Vibe, Q, among others. Billboard said, "The Year depicts a story unfolding right in front of your eyes. Tim has said he wanted to make the album "cinematic." and he has accomplished that as The Year is a true auditory-meets-cinematic masterpiece."

Myers made an appearance on The Tonight Show on February 15, 2016. Myers co-wrote the #1 song "Stardust" that reached Gold status for the German artist Lena Meyer-Landrut. Myers also co-wrote and produced "We Are Young", that reached #1 on the Billboard Dance Charts with Vassy. Myers also co-wrote several songs with Joy Williams of The Civil Wars including "The Look Of Love", where he is featured as a vocalist. In 2017, Myers and James Arthur released a single together "Sorry Don't Live Here."

=== Palladium Records ===
Myers founded Palladium Records in 2009. By 2015, the label had 16 different alternative pop artists on its roster, including The Unknown, FM Radio, Map The Stars, Lucy & The Cloud Parade, Beach Monster, MoZella, Serengeti, and Lenachka. The label has been able to amass millions of streams as well as hundreds of placements in film, commercials and television shows for indie artists.

== 2026 political campaigns ==
On April 17, 2025, Myers announced that he would run for the U.S. House of Representatives in California's 41st congressional district as a Democrat, challenging incumbent U.S. Representative Ken Calvert. He opposes the Trump administration's tax, health, and fiscal policies and administrative actions, in particular criticizing Elon Musk and Secretary of Health and Human Services Robert F. Kennedy Jr. Myers withdrew from the race on July 7, 2025, announcing that he would instead run for lieutenant governor of California in 2026. He ultimately failed to advance to the general election.
