= Wuppertal I =

Federal electoral district of Germany

101 Wuppertal I
- Electoral district for the Bundestag
- Wuppertal I in 2025
- State: North Rhine-Westphalia
- Population: 313,000 (2019)
- Electorate: 202,528 (2021)
- Major settlements: Wuppertal (partial)
- Area: 130.8 km^{2}

Current electoral district
- Created: 1949
- Party: SPD
- Member: Helge Lindh
- Elected: 2017, 2021, 2025

Wuppertal I is an electoral constituency (German: Wahlkreis) represented in the Bundestag. It elects one member via first-past-the-post voting. Under the current constituency numbering system, it is designated as constituency 101. It is located in western North Rhine-Westphalia, comprising most of the city of Wuppertal.

Wuppertal I was created for the inaugural 1949 federal election. Since 2017, it has been represented by Helge Lindh of the Social Democratic Party (SPD).

== Geography ==
Wuppertal I is located in western North Rhine-Westphalia. As of the 2021 federal election, it comprises the entirety of the independent city of Wuppertal excluding the districts of Cronenberg and Ronsdorf.

== History ==
Wuppertal I was created in 1949. In the 1949 election, it was North Rhine-Westphalia constituency 16 in the numbering system. From 1953 through 1961, it was number 75. From 1965 through 1998, it was number 69. From 2002 through 2009, it was number 103. In the 2013 through 2021 elections, it was number 102. From the 2025 election, it has been number 101.

Originally, the constituency comprised the districts of Elberfeld, Elberfeld-West, Uellendahl-Katernberg, Vohwinkel, and Cronenberg from the city of Wuppertal. It acquired its current borders in the 2002 election.

Election	No.	Name	Borders
1949	16	Wuppertal I	Wuppertal city (only Elberfeld, Elberfeld-West, Uellendahl-Katernberg, Vohwinkel, and Cronenberg districts)
1953	75	Wuppertal I	Wuppertal city (only Elberfeld, Elberfeld-West, Uellendahl-Katernberg, Vohwinkel, and Cronenberg districts)
1957	75	Wuppertal I	Wuppertal city (only Elberfeld, Elberfeld-West, Uellendahl-Katernberg, Vohwinkel, and Cronenberg districts)
1961	75	Wuppertal I	Wuppertal city (only Elberfeld, Elberfeld-West, Uellendahl-Katernberg, Vohwinkel, and Cronenberg districts)
1965	69	Wuppertal I	Wuppertal city (only Elberfeld, Elberfeld-West, Uellendahl-Katernberg, Vohwinkel, and Cronenberg districts)
1969	69	Wuppertal I	Wuppertal city (only Elberfeld, Elberfeld-West, Uellendahl-Katernberg, Vohwinkel, and Cronenberg districts)
1972	69	Wuppertal I	Wuppertal city (only Elberfeld, Elberfeld-West, Uellendahl-Katernberg, Vohwinkel, and Cronenberg districts)
1976	69	Wuppertal I	Wuppertal city (only Elberfeld, Elberfeld-West, Uellendahl-Katernberg, Vohwinkel, and Cronenberg districts)
1980	69	Wuppertal I	Wuppertal city (only Elberfeld, Elberfeld-West, Uellendahl-Katernberg, Vohwinkel, and Cronenberg districts)
1983	69	Wuppertal I	Wuppertal city (only Elberfeld, Elberfeld-West, Uellendahl-Katernberg, Vohwinkel, and Cronenberg districts)
1987	69	Wuppertal I	Wuppertal city (only Elberfeld, Elberfeld-West, Uellendahl-Katernberg, Vohwinkel, and Cronenberg districts)
1990	69	Wuppertal I	Wuppertal city (only Elberfeld, Elberfeld-West, Uellendahl-Katernberg, Vohwinkel, and Cronenberg districts)
1994	69	Wuppertal I	Wuppertal city (only Elberfeld, Elberfeld-West, Uellendahl-Katernberg, Vohwinkel, and Cronenberg districts)
1998	69	Wuppertal I	Wuppertal city (only Elberfeld, Elberfeld-West, Uellendahl-Katernberg, Vohwinkel, and Cronenberg districts)
2002	103	Wuppertal I	Wuppertal city (excluding Cronenberg and Ronsdorf districts)
2005	103	Wuppertal I	Wuppertal city (excluding Cronenberg and Ronsdorf districts)
2009	103	Wuppertal I	Wuppertal city (excluding Cronenberg and Ronsdorf districts)
2013	102	Wuppertal I	Wuppertal city (excluding Cronenberg and Ronsdorf districts)
2017	102	Wuppertal I	Wuppertal city (excluding Cronenberg and Ronsdorf districts)
2021	102	Wuppertal I	Wuppertal city (excluding Cronenberg and Ronsdorf districts)
2025	101	Wuppertal I	Wuppertal city (excluding Cronenberg and Ronsdorf districts)

== Members ==
The constituency was first represented by Carl Wirths of the Free Democratic Party (FDP) from 1949 to 1957. He was succeeded by Otto Schmidt of the Christian Democratic Union (CDU) in the 1957 election. Schmidt served until 1965, when Hermann Herberts of the Social Democratic Party (SPD) was elected for a single term. Adolf Scheu of the SPD succeeded him in 1969 and served until 1980. He was followed by Rudolf Dreßler until 2002. Manfred Zöllmer was representative from 2002 to 2017. Helge Lindh was elected in 2017.

Election	Member	Party	%
1949	Carl Wirths	FDP	39.4
1953	Carl Wirths	FDP	50.5
1957	Otto Schmidt	CDU	53.4
1961	Otto Schmidt	CDU	39.8
1965	Hermann Herberts	SPD	45.3
1969	Adolf Scheu	SPD	50.4
1972	Adolf Scheu	SPD	50.2
1976	Adolf Scheu	SPD	42.6
1980	Rudolf Dreßler	SPD	45.1
1983	Rudolf Dreßler	SPD	45.8
1987	Rudolf Dreßler	SPD	45.6
1990	Rudolf Dreßler	SPD	40.0
1994	Rudolf Dreßler	SPD	45.5
1998	Rudolf Dreßler	SPD	53.1
2002	Manfred Zöllmer	SPD	49.9
2005	Manfred Zöllmer	SPD	47.9
2009	Manfred Zöllmer	SPD	35.8
2013	Manfred Zöllmer	SPD	40.7
2017	Helge Lindh	SPD	31.5
2021	Helge Lindh	SPD	37.3
2025	Helge Lindh	SPD	33.6

== Election results ==
=== 2025 election ===
Federal election (2025): Wuppertal I
Notes:	Blue background denotes the winner of the electorate vote. Pink background denotes a candidate elected from their party list. Yellow background denotes an electorate win by a list member, or other incumbent. A ✓ or ✗ denotes status of any incumbent, win or lose respectively.						
Party	Candidate	Votes	%	±%	Party votes	%	±%
SPD	✓ Helge Lindh	50,907	33.6	▼3.7	30,704	20.2	▼9.0
CDU	Thomas Haldenwang	36,841	24.3	▲2.2	35,829	23.5	▲2.6
AfD	Frank Schnaack	27,707	18.3	▲10.0	27,299	17.9	▲9.6
Left	Till Sörensen-Siebel	13,852	9.1	▲4.5	18,608	12.2	▲6.7
Greens	Anja Liebert	13,033	8.6	▼4.5	19,165	12.6	▼4.9
BSW					8,248	5.4	
FDP	René Schunck	4,563	3.0	▼6.5	6,286	4.1	▼6.9
Tierschutzpartei					1,923	1.3	▼0.2
Volt	Samuel Scholz	1,913	1.3	▲0.6	1,169	0.8	▲0.3
FW	Henrik Dahlmann	1,805	1.2	▲0.1	670	0.4	▼0.2
Independent	Reiner Füllmich	1,051	0.7				
PARTEI				▼1.8	890	0.6	▼0.6
dieBasis				▼1.4	354	0.2	▼1.0
Team Todenhöfer					326	0.2	▼1.0
PdF					249	0.2	▲0.1
BD					149	0.1	
MERA25					98	0.1	
MLPD				▼0.1	93	0.1	0.0
Values					91	0.1	
Pirates							▼0.4
Gesundheitsforschung							▼0.1
Humanists							▼0.1
Bündnis C							▼0.1
ÖDP							▼0.1
SGP						0.0	0.0
Informal votes		1,442			963		
Total valid votes		151,672			152,151		
Turnout		153,114	78.9	▲5.5			
SPD hold	Majority	14,066	9.3				

=== 2021 election ===
Federal election (2021): Wuppertal I
Notes:	Blue background denotes the winner of the electorate vote. Pink background denotes a candidate elected from their party list. Yellow background denotes an electorate win by a list member, or other incumbent. A ✓ or ✗ denotes status of any incumbent, win or lose respectively.						
Party	Candidate	Votes	%	±%	Party votes	%	±%
SPD	✓ Helge Lindh	54,065	37.3	▲5.8	42,421	29.2	▲3.1
CDU	Caroline Lünenschloss	31,960	22.0	▼7.6	30,527	21.0	▼5.5
Greens	Anja Liebert	18,932	13.1	▲5.6	25,388	17.5	▲8.9
FDP	Manfred Todtenhausen	13,756	9.5	▲0.8	15,970	11.0	▼1.4
AfD	Martin Liedtke-Bentlage	11,995	8.3	▼2.8	12,090	8.3	▼2.7
Left	Till Sörensen-Siebel	6,742	4.7	▼4.2	8,055	5.5	▼5.3
Tierschutzpartei					2,159	1.5	▲0.6
Team Todenhöfer					1,713	1.2	
PARTEI	Thomas Hofmann	2,665	1.8	▲0.1	1,674	1.2	▲0.1
dieBasis	Alexander Grefarth	2,068	1.4		1,733	1.2	
FW	Henrik Dahlmann	1,544	1.1		964	0.7	▲0.4
Volt	Lars Herbold	1,028	0.7		732	0.5	
Pirates					533	0.4	▼0.2
LIEBE					167	0.1	
NPD					167	0.1	▼0.1
Gesundheitsforschung					152	0.1	0.0
LfK					129	0.1	
V-Partei3					126	0.1	0.0
Humanists					123	0.1	0.0
MLPD	Nuran Cakmakli-Kraft	203	0.1	0.0	122	0.1	0.0
Bündnis C					115	0.1	
ÖDP					97	0.1	▼0.1
du.					78	0.1	
DKP					58	0.0	0.0
PdF					49	0.0	
SGP					30	0.0	0.0
LKR					27	0.0	
Informal votes		1,741			1,300		
Total valid votes		144,958			145,399		
Turnout		146,699	72.4	▲0.4			
SPD hold	Majority	22,105	15.3	▲13.4			

=== 2017 election ===
Federal election (2017): Wuppertal I
Notes:	Blue background denotes the winner of the electorate vote. Pink background denotes a candidate elected from their party list. Yellow background denotes an electorate win by a list member, or other incumbent. A ✓ or ✗ denotes status of any incumbent, win or lose respectively.						
Party	Candidate	Votes	%	±%	Party votes	%	±%
SPD	Helge Lindh	46,657	31.5	▼9.2	38,696	26.0	▼6.4
CDU	Rainer Spiecker	43,814	29.6	▼7.0	39,341	26.5	▼6.5
AfD	Dietmar Gedig	16,339	11.0		16,431	11.1	▲6.9
Left	Bernhard Sander	13,120	8.9	▲1.2	16,100	10.8	▲2.2
FDP	Manfred Todtenhausen	12,910	8.7	▲5.7	18,437	12.4	▲6.7
Greens	Sylvia Meyer	10,987	7.4	▲0.3	12,754	8.6	▼1.4
PARTEI	Julia Wiedow	2,536	1.7		1,504	1.0	▲0.3
Tierschutzpartei					1,250	0.8	
Pirates	Stefan Kottas	1,407	1.0	▼2.0	839	0.6	▼1.9
AD-DEMOKRATEN					816	0.5	
NPD					376	0.3	▼0.9
FW					320	0.2	▼0.1
DM					252	0.2	
DiB					228	0.2	
BGE					202	0.1	
MLPD	Fritz Ullmann	236	0.2		194	0.1	0.0
ÖDP					183	0.1	0.0
V-Partei³					163	0.1	
Die Humanisten					151	0.1	
Gesundheitsforschung					137	0.1	
Volksabstimmung					135	0.1	▼0.1
DKP					46	0.0	
SGP					12	0.0	0.0
Informal votes		1,944			1,383		
Total valid votes		148,006			148,567		
Turnout		149,950	72.0	▲3.6			
SPD hold	Majority	2,843	1.9	▼2.2			

=== 2013 election ===
Federal election (2013): Wuppertal I
Notes:	Blue background denotes the winner of the electorate vote. Pink background denotes a candidate elected from their party list. Yellow background denotes an electorate win by a list member, or other incumbent. A ✓ or ✗ denotes status of any incumbent, win or lose respectively.						
Party	Candidate	Votes	%	±%	Party votes	%	±%
SPD	✓ Manfred Zöllmer	58,407	40.7	▲4.9	46,638	32.4	▲5.0
CDU	Peter Hintze	52,427	36.6	▲2.3	47,470	33.0	▲4.4
Left	Bernhard Sander	10,992	7.7	▼2.8	12,499	8.7	▼3.0
Greens	Hermann E. Ott	10,198	7.1	▼2.2	14,318	9.9	▼2.8
FDP	Manfred Todtenhausen	4,314	3.0	▼5.3	8,198	5.7	▼7.9
AfD					5,989	4.2	
Pirates	Franz Rudolf Büning	4,264	3.0		3,561	2.5	▲0.5
NPD	Michael Schnorr	2,803	2.0	▲0.3	1,620	1.1	▲0.1
PARTEI					962	0.7	
PRO					473	0.3	
FW					440	0.3	
REP					390	0.3	▼0.5
Volksabstimmung					311	0.2	▲0.1
Nichtwahler					227	0.2	
ÖDP					202	0.1	▲0.1
BIG					187	0.1	
MLPD					131	0.1	0.0
Party of Reason					126	0.1	
Die Rechte					79	0.1	
RRP					61	0.0	▼0.1
PSG					37	0.0	0.0
BüSo					19	0.0	0.0
Informal votes		2,520			1,987		
Total valid votes		143,405			143,938		
Turnout		145,925	68.5	▲1.5			
SPD hold	Majority	5,980	4.1	▲2.6			

=== 2009 election ===
Federal election (2009): Wuppertal I
Notes:	Blue background denotes the winner of the electorate vote. Pink background denotes a candidate elected from their party list. Yellow background denotes an electorate win by a list member, or other incumbent. A ✓ or ✗ denotes status of any incumbent, win or lose respectively.						
Party	Candidate	Votes	%	±%	Party votes	%	±%
SPD	✓ Manfred Zöllmer	51,180	35.8	▼12.1	39,244	27.4	▼13.0
CDU	Peter Hintze	49,021	34.3	▼1.2	40,972	28.6	▼0.2
Left	Bernhard Sander	15,003	10.5	▲4.7	16,743	11.7	▲4.6
Greens	Hermann E. Ott	13,308	9.3	▲4.6	18,285	12.8	▲3.5
FDP	Manfred Todtenhausen	11,852	8.3	▲4.0	19,458	13.6	▲2.9
Pirates					2,880	2.0	
NPD	Michael Schnorr	2,337	1.6	▲0.3	1,537	1.1	▲0.1
REP					1,098	0.8	0.0
Tierschutzpartei					1,009	0.7	▲0.1
FAMILIE					629	0.4	0.0
RENTNER					533	0.4	
RRP					189	0.1	
Volksabstimmung					169	0.1	0.0
ÖDP					128	0.1	
MLPD	Helmut Böhmler	287	0.2		114	0.1	0.0
DVU					78	0.1	
Centre					56	0.0	0.0
PSG					27	0.0	0.0
BüSo					25	0.0	0.0
Informal votes		2,101			1,915		
Total valid votes		142,988			143,174		
Turnout		145,089	67.0	▼8.4			
SPD hold	Majority	2,159	1.5	▼10.9			

=== 2005 election ===
Federal election (2005): Wuppertal I
Notes:	Blue background denotes the winner of the electorate vote. Pink background denotes a candidate elected from their party list. Yellow background denotes an electorate win by a list member, or other incumbent. A ✓ or ✗ denotes status of any incumbent, win or lose respectively.						
Party	Candidate	Votes	%	±%	Party votes	%	±%
SPD	✓ Manfred Zöllmer	78,426	47.9	▼2.1	66,241	40.4	▼2.4
CDU	Peter Goal	58,192	35.5	▲1.9	47,248	28.8	▼1.3
Left	Gerd-Peter Zielenzinski	9,454	5.8	▲4.0	11,629	7.1	▲5.0
Greens	Sebastian Sewerin	7,720	4.7	▼1.2	15,229	9.3	▼2.2
FDP	Peter Engelmann	7,008	4.3	▼2.9	17,473	10.6	▲0.1
NPD	Sascha Guderian	2,106	1.3		1,542	0.9	▲0.6
REP					1,186	0.7	▲0.1
GRAUEN					1,095	0.7	▲0.3
Tierschutzpartei					943	0.6	▲0.1
PARTEI	Uwe Becker	943	0.6				
Familie					719	0.4	▲0.2
PBC					290	0.1	▼0.1
From Now on... Democracy Through Referendum					184	0.1	
MLPD					114	0.1	
Socialist Equality Party					86	0.1	
Centre					47	0.0	
BüSo					50	0.0	0.0
Informal votes		2,526			2,299		
Total valid votes		163,849			164,076		
Turnout		166,375	75.4	▼1.7			
SPD hold	Majority	20,234	12.4				
