= Disraelis =

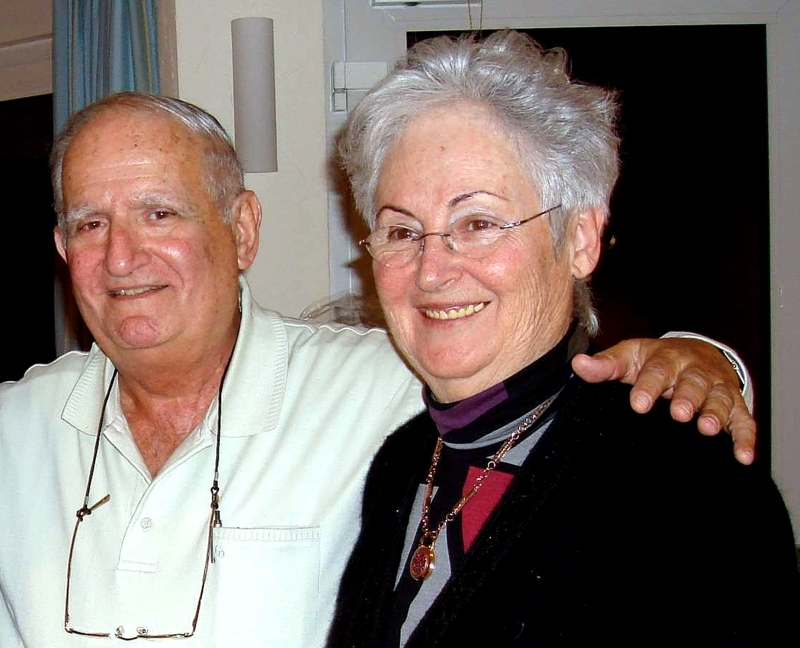
Ilan and Esti Brunner

DisraeliS (short for disabled Israelis), is a private initiative that was founded in 2002 by Ilan Brunner and his wife Esti in Tel Aviv. The project is made possible by volunteer workers.

== History ==
Ilan Brunner, born 1934 in Prague, was among the Jewish children who left Germany for England in 1939 with the Kindertransport (Refugee Children Movement), and so survived the Holocaust. After the Second World War, he went to Israel and worked there for 40 years as a Press Officer and photographer for the Israeli Ministry of Defense.

During his service as an army spokesman, Ilan Brunner welcomed many German visitors to Israel and thus came in contact with a new generation of Germans who were interested in Israel and the fate of Israeli soldiers. As a result of long-standing relationships, intense contacts and friendships were able to be established. It was also within this context that the idea was born to invite young Israelis who were wounded during their military service or by terrorist attacks to a recreational stay in Germany.

It all began in Israel in 1997. Horst-Klaus Hofmann, the founder of the German ecumenical community Offensive Junger Christen (OJC, also known as The Reichenberg Fellowship), met Ilan Brunner at a liturgical penitential service at the Holocaust memorial Yad Vashem. In collaboration with Hofmann and the Lutheran pastor Wolfgang Breithaupt from Weitenhagen/Germany and with the support of many donors, a vocational stay was made possible in the summer of 2002: Accompanied by Mr. and Mrs. Brunner, 18 young Israelis came to the church meeting center Haus der Stille (House of Silence) in Weitenhagen near Greifswald/Germany.

== Goals ==
The project has three main focuses: establishing personal contacts, reducing prejudices and increasing understanding regarding the situation of Israel. It also aims to promote understanding and friendship between Israelis and Christians of various nations. Thus, young Israeli women and men between the ages of 18 and 28 who have been wounded by terrorist attacks during their military service have received the opportunity to visit organizations and individuals in Germany. Up until 2010, more than 1000 Israelis have come abroad for a holiday, receiving invitations from groups and individuals from the United States, England, Germany, Switzerland and other countries. For the Holocaust survivor Ilan Brunner, these relationships are of special significance: "They serve to make the idea of reconciliation between our peoples a reality, without forgetting the past. These relationships build bridges – one by one."

== Activities ==
The project was met with a strong response from Christians and churches in Germany. At the invitation of Pastor Wolfgang Breithaupt, the first group visited the Haus der Stille at Weitenhagen in 2002. A second group of 20 young Israelis came to the Offensive Junger Christen e.V. (OJC) in Reichelsheim in May 2003. In order to continue the ongoing dialogue, nine OJC members travelled to Israel in August 2004 to visit the Disraelis who had been in Reichelsheim in the spring of 2003. In May 2006, 18 young Israelis were hosted by the OJC for a 10-day visit. In March 2007, the OJC staff made another return visit to Israel. In the summer of 2007, together with Wolfgang and Elke Breithaupt from the Haus der Stille, members of the OJC invited Israeli "orphaned" couples who had lost a child. Another group of 18 young Israelis came to Reichelsheim in 2008. In July 2010, a fourth group of young Israelis were hosted by the OJC in Reichelsheim. On the occasion of one of the first group trips to Weitenhagen, the bishop of the Pomeranian Evangelical Church, Hans-Jürgen Abromeit, wrote a welcoming address.

In 2003, the Christian bridge-building and reconciliation organization Dienste in Israel invited Israeli terror victims to Hanover, who were hosted by German families. In the early summer of 2005, 14 Disraelis came to Kassel in Northern Hesse at the invitation of the organization Israel Heute – Christen an der Seite Israels e.V. The Christian association Ebenezer Hilfsfonds Deutschland e.V., whose goal is to promote reconciliation and to help Jews return to Israel, was also one of the project partners. At the invitation of the organization Christen an der Seite Israels, a group of Disraelis visited the Kassel region in May 2004. Churches such as the Protestant Church Werben/Lower Lausitz and Christian organizations such as the German YMCA have also participated in the Disraelis project.

In addition, some cities and municipalities have served as partners of Disraelis. In June 2007, 20 disabled soldiers visited the town Schönebeck in Saxony-Anhalt. They stayed with host families and at the YMCA. On the occasion of the 70th anniversary of the Kristallnacht, Ilan Brunner held a lecture at the Georg-August-Zinn School in Reichelsheim.

In July 2009, a meeting between 20 young Disraelis and members of the Hans Rosenthal Lodge e.V. took place in Berlin. The project has also been supported by the German Armed Forces, the German Ministry of Defence and the German Embassy in Israel. Many individuals and families have hosted young Israelis since the beginning of the project.

On 18 September 2004, the Central German Broadcasting Company MDR aired a report on the Disraelis project in its television program "Credible" (author: Frieder Weigmann).

In the German Embassy in Israel, Ilan Brunner was awarded the Cross of the Order of Merit of the Federal Republic of Germany by Ambassador Andreas Michaelis on 6 May 2015 in recognition of his extraordinary contribution to reconciliation between Jews and Israelis and Germans. On April 13, 2023, Ilan Brunner died in Israel a few days before his 89th birthday and was buried in the cemetery in Rishon LeZion. Since he did not find a successor for his Disraelis project, it was terminated.
