= Susanne Wasum-Rainer =

German diplomat (born 1956)

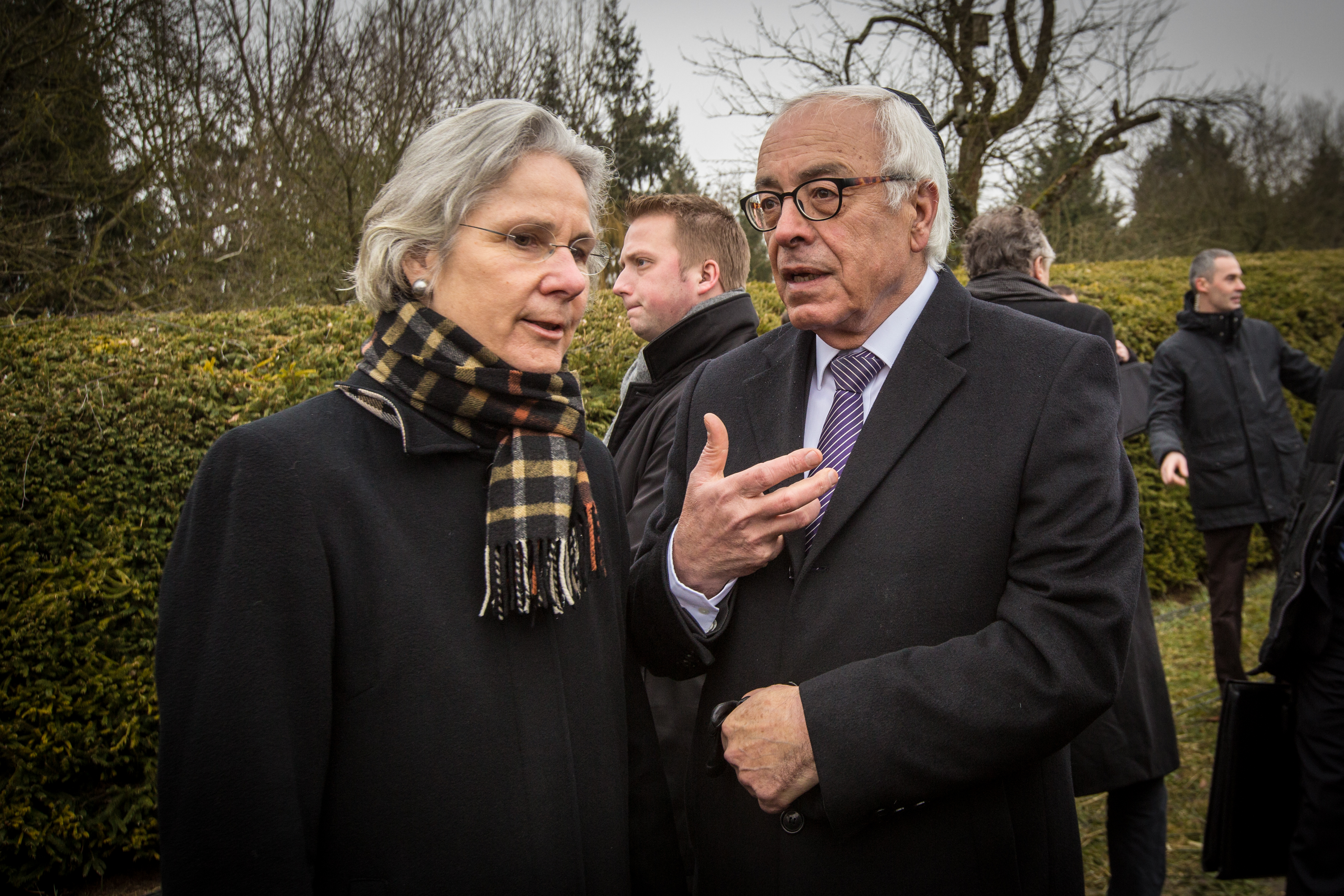
- Susanne Wasum-Rainer with Israel's ambassador to France Yossi Gal in Sarre-Union, February 2015

German Ambassador to Israel
- In office 2018–2022
- Preceded by: Clemens von Goetze
- Succeeded by: Steffen Seibert

German Ambassador to France and Monaco
- In office 2012–2015
- Preceded by: Reinhard Schäfers
- Succeeded by: Nikolaus Meyer-Landrut

Personal details
- Born: 31 July 1956 (age 70) Mainz, West Germany (now Germany)
- Education: University of Mainz, University of Passau, LMU Munich

Susanne Wasum-Rainer (born 31 July 1956) is a former German diplomat who served as Germany's Ambassador to Israel between 2018 and 2022.

== Early life and education ==
Born in Mainz, she passed her Abitur there in 1975. She started to study law at the University of Mainz, later studied at the University of Passau and LMU Munich. She passed her first Staatsexamen in 1981 followed by the second Staatsexamen in 1984. She obtained a doctorate at the University of Passau in 1983 with a thesis on Der internationale Seegerichtshof im System der obligatorischen Streitbeilegungsverfahren der Seerechtskonvention (The International Tribunal for the Law of the Sea in the system of obligatory...), After two years of research at the German Institute for International and Security Affairs, she started her training to be an officer in diplomatic service in 1986.

== Diplomatic career ==
After completion of the training and completion of the Attaché career examination in 1989, Wasum-Rainer first worked in the headquarters of the Foreign Office in Bonn and later at the embassy in Morocco. She returned to the Foreign Office before she was sent to the Embassy in Israel from 1991 to 1993 and staff member at the Permanent Representative to the United Nations Office at Geneva until 1997.

In 2000, Wasum-Rainer returned to the Foreign Office and was first officer, after 2002 and 2006 Head of Unit Supervisor. From 2009 to 2012, head of the Legal Department of the Foreign Office and advisor on international law to the federal government.

From 2012 until 2015, Wasum-Rainer served as German Ambassador to France; she was the first female person to hold the post and succeeded Reinhard Schäfers. Between 2015 and 2018 she served as Ambassador to Italy, and in 2018 she was appointed Ambassador to Israel.

Susanne Wasum-Rainer speaks besides her mother tongue, English, Italian and Hebrew.

== Works ==
- Wasum-Rainer, Winkelmann, & Tiroch: Arctic Science, International Law and Climate Change: Legal Aspects of Marine Science in the Arctic Ocean Springer, 2012
