= Steffen Seibert =

German journalist and ambassador (born 1960)

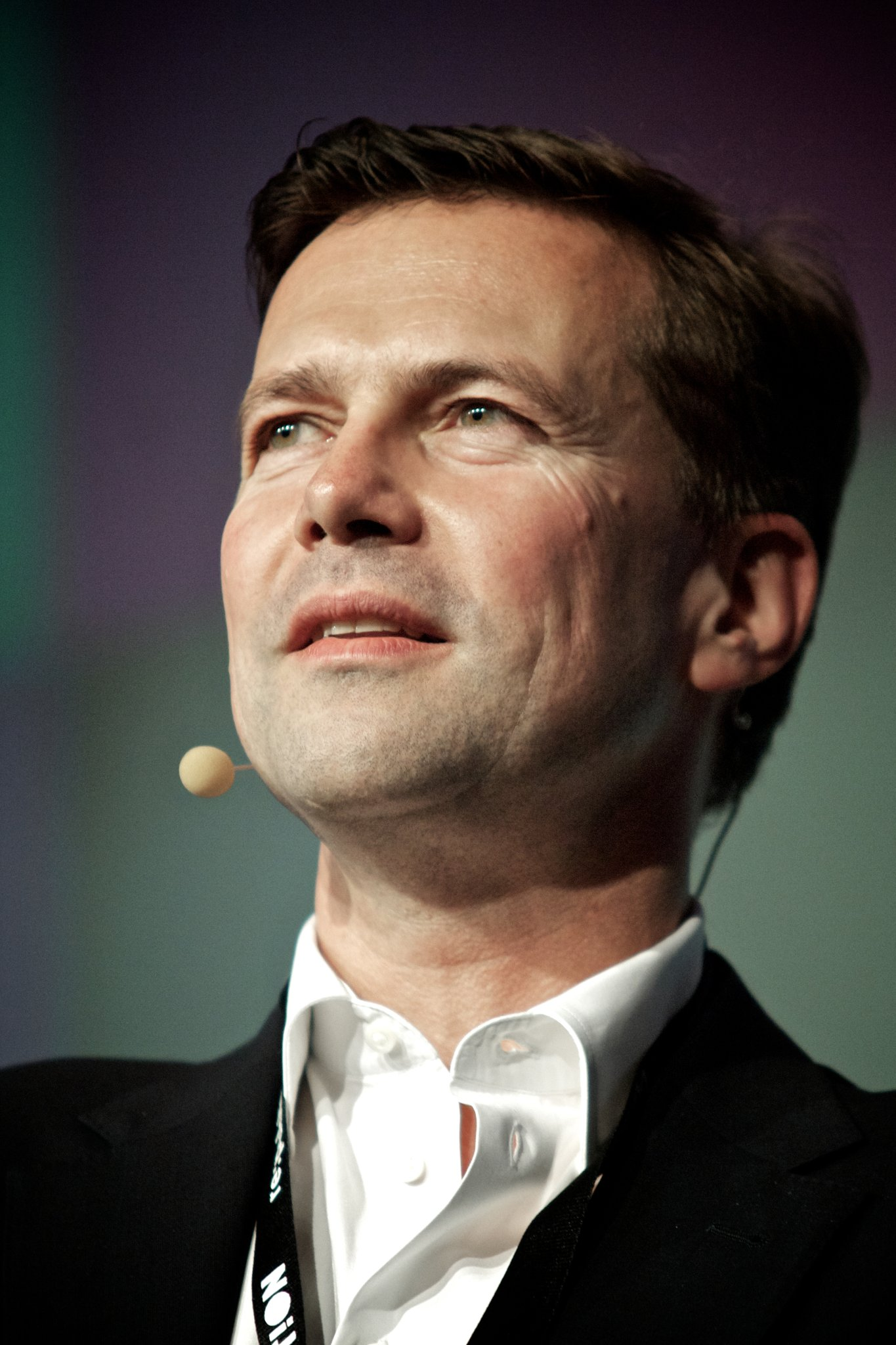
- Seibert in 2012

German Ambassador to Israel
- In office 2022–2026
- President: Frank-Walter Steinmeier
- Preceded by: Susanne Wasum-Rainer
- Succeeded by: Alexander Graf Lambsdorff

Spokesperson of the Federal Government
- In office 11 August 2010 – 8 December 2021
- Chancellor: Angela Merkel
- Deputy: Ulrike Demmer; Martina Fietz
- Preceded by: Ulrich Wilhelm
- Succeeded by: Steffen Hebestreit

Chief of the Federal Press Office
- In office 11 August 2010 – 8 December 2021
- Chancellor: Angela Merkel
- Deputy: Ulrike Demmer
- Preceded by: Ulrich Wilhelm
- Succeeded by: Steffen Hebestreit

Personal details
- Born: 7 June 1960 (age 66) Munich, West Germany
- Party: Christian Democratic Union
- Education: University of Hamburg; London School of Economics
- Profession: Historian

Steffen Rüdiger Seibert (born 7 June 1960 in Munich) is a German journalist and former television host who is best known as head of the German Federal Government's Press and Information Office and as Chancellor Angela Merkel's spokesperson from 2010 to 2021. During his tenure, Seibert was officially ranked as a Secretary of State.

Previously Seibert worked for the German television station ZDF as a journalist and presenter of the popular heute-journal (until 2010).

== Early life ==
Seibert was born in Munich in 1960, and went to school at the Tellkampfschule in Hanover. He then studied history in Hamburg and at the London School of Economics.

== Career ==
Seibert worked for ZDF from 1989 to 2010. In addition to his roles at ZDF, he co-hosted the Bavarian TV Awards in 2005 (alongside Nina Ruge) and in 2009 (alongside Markus Kavka). He also moderated the event series Nobelpreisträger in Mönchengladbach with guests F. W. de Klerk (2004), Mikhail Gorbachev (2007) and the 14th Dalai Lama (2008).

Seibert was an ambassador of UNICEF in Germany. In this capacity, he visited some of the organization's projects in Angola in 2003.

From late 2016, Seibert was a member of the German government's cabinet committee on Brexit at which ministers discuss organizational and structural issues related to the United Kingdom's departure from the European Union.

=== German Ambassador to Israel (2022–2026) ===
After leaving government, Seibert served as the German Ambassador to Israel from 2022 to 2026. Following the 2023 October 7 attacks on Israel, Seibert advocated for the release of hostages taken by Hamas and an end to the Gaza war.

In August 2024, Seibert shared a suicide note purported to have been written by a survivor of the Nova music festival massacre. Israel's Channel 13 later debunked the note as a fabrication. Seibert later tweeted, "I regret having believed – like so many others – that that suicide letter was real. It turns out it was a fake."

In August 2026, after he had left his position, Seibert criticized the Israeli government and its settlement policy in the West Bank as "disastrous".

== Personal life ==
Seibert is married to an artist. He and his wife have a daughter and two sons. They lived in Wiesbaden before moving to Berlin's Dahlem district in 2011.

== Recognition ==
- 2001 – Goldene Kamera (for Special Show 9/11)
- 2005 – Bambi (shared with Johannes B. Kerner for a show for the disaster victims of the tsunami in the 2004 Indian Ocean earthquake)
- 2013 – Order of the Star of Italy

== Other activities ==
- UNICEF National Committee of Germany, Member
- "Club for early born babies" (Bundesverband "Das frühgeborene Kind"), Chairman (until 2008)
- International Journalists' Programmes, Arthur F. Burns Fellowship Program, Member of the Board of Trustees
- Städel Museum, Member of the Board of Trustees
- Kinderhospiz Bethel, Official Partner
