= Nikolaus Meyer-Landrut =

German diplomat

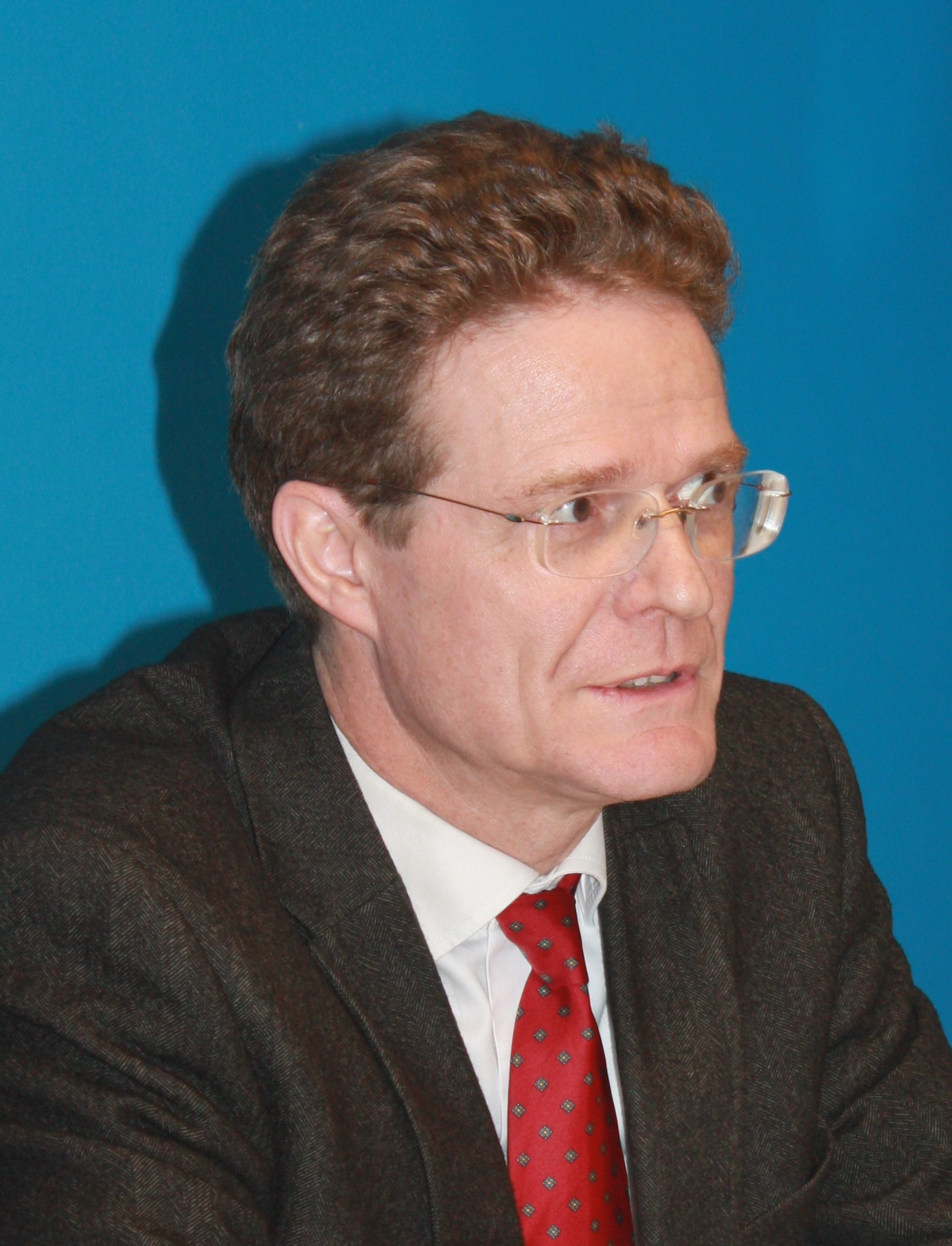

Head of the EU Delegation to Turkey
- Incumbent
- Assumed office September 4, 2020
- Preceded by: Christian Berger

German Ambassador to France and Monaco
- In office July 27, 2015 – August 31, 2020
- President: Joachim Gauck
- Preceded by: Susanne Wasum-Rainer
- Succeeded by: Hans-Dieter Lucas

Personal details
- Born: 1960 (age 65–66) West Germany (now Germany)
- Children: 4
- Education: University of Cologne

Nikolaus Meyer-Landrut (born 1960) is a German diplomat currently serving as the German ambassador to the Netherlands (Aug. 2024). He was the Head of the EU Delegation to Turkey. He was previously German Ambassador to France from 2015 to 2020. Before that, he served as the chief adviser for European affairs to the German Chancellor, Angela Merkel.

== Early life and education ==
Meyer-Landrut was born in 1960 and was awarded his PhD in history, examining the role of France in German reunification, at the University of Cologne in 1988.

== Career ==
In 1987, Meyer-Landrut joined the German foreign office under the third cabinet of the conservative chancellor Helmut Kohl. Between 1990 and 1993, the diplomat served in Vienna, leading the German negotiations of the Treaty on Conventional Armed Forces in Europe, and advised on German foreign affairs in Brussels thereafter (until 1995). From 1995 to 1999, Meyer-Landrut was deputy chief of the central ministerial office in Bonn, responsible for the Amsterdam Treaty and the Common Foreign and Security Policy of the European Union among other things attached to that portfolio.

Between 1999 and summer 2002, Meyer-Landrut served as press spokesperson of the Permanent Representation of the Federal Republic of Germany to the European Union under the social democratic–green Schröder administration and was appointed spokesperson of the president of the Convention on the Future of Europe by Valéry Giscard d’Estaing, the convention's president and former president of France (1974–81). Between September 2003 and April 2006, he advised as leading official on European affairs in the Federal Foreign Office and joined the German Chancellery, advising on the same topic, in May of the same year.

From February 2011 until mid-2015, Meyer-Landrut served as chief adviser to Merkel on European affairs, thereby succeeding Uwe Corsepius.

In July 2015, Meyer-Landrut succeeded Susanne Wasum-Rainer as German Ambassador to France. In 2018, Foreign Minister Heiko Maas vetoed Merkel's plan to appoint Meyer-Landrut as Germany's Permanent Representative to the European Union in Brussels.

== Other activities ==
- Jacques Delors Institute Berlin, Member of the Advisory Board
- Broader European Leadership Agenda (BELA), Member of the Circle of Active Supporters

== Personal life ==
Meyer-Landrut is married to a Frenchwoman and father of four children. He is the nephew of Andreas Meyer-Landrut, head of the Bundespräsidialamt under former German president Richard von Weizsäcker (1984–94), and first cousin once removed of singer Lena Meyer-Landrut.
