= Atlantic Initiative =

German non-profit organization

The Atlantic Initiative (or "Atlantische Initiative" in German) is a non-partisan, non-profit and independent organization founded in Berlin in 2004. The organization's goal is to promote German-American friendship as well as research in the field of international relations. Today, the Atlantic Initiative runs the online think tank Atlantic Community, and previously issued the blog Deutschlands Agenda until 2017 and published the monthly Global Must Reads until 2014.

== Organization ==
Johannes Bohnen & Jan Kallmorgen are the founding directors. Other founding members include: Alexander Graf Lambsdorff (MdEP, FDP), Björn Sackniess, Christoph Schwegmann (BMVg), Andrea Stürmer (Zurich Financial Services), Rüdiger C. Sura (Deutsche Bank), Jan Techau (Carnegie Europe), Philip Christian Wachs (Haus Rissen), Magnus Prinz zu Wied (Huntsman Materials & Effects), Tobias Wolny (BP) and Lars Zimmermann (Stiftung Neue Verantwortung).

In addition, a 32-person board of advisors from business, politics, and academics supports the Atlantic Initiative. In the past, the organization financed its work with money from its members, government grants, and commissioned work for third parties.

== Online Think Tank Atlantic Community ==
Atlantic Community is an online foreign policy think tank with over 7,000 members that was launched in 2007 as a project of the Atlantic Initiative. The members of Atlantic Community share and discuss their ideas by posting op-eds and research papers on the website, www.atlantic-community.org. The submissions are then assessed and edited by the editorial staff before being published on the website. Readers discuss the ideas and suggestions presented in the articles by posting comments. The editorial staff then condenses the debates into Atlantic Memos. These memos are executive summaries that harness the collective intelligence of the community and present the most outstanding solutions and policy recommendations. Atlantic Memos are sent to policy makers in over 27 countries across the Atlantic for their consideration. Atlantic-community.org also features numerous events, theme weeks, and special features such as Policy Workshop Competitions and Q&As with senior policy makers.

=== Awards ===
- 2008 RIAS Award.
- 2009 Official Landmark within "Germany - Land of Ideas"
- 2009 "Speaker- and Dialogue-Award" from Berlinpolis and ProDialog.

== Global Must Reads ==
Global Must Reads has been published monthly by the Atlantic Initiative from August 2005 until 2014. It is a selection of studies and analyses from over 50 American and European sources (Think Tanks, magazines, and journals), which are concisely summarized. With a readership of over 22,000, Global Must Reads, according to the Atlantic Initiative, is the "farthest-reaching foreign policy publication in the German language". The Atlantic Initiative's Global Must Reads are not limited to German and American relationships, but cover a vast array of subjects, including digital security and women taking on leadership positions.

== Deutschlands Agenda ==
The organization published the blog project, "Deutschlands Agenda" (Germany's Agenda), from 2011 to 2017. The project was created on the reworked homepage of the Atlantic Initiative. With the aim of providing "foreign policy for all", the organization aspires to offer a forum for debate on German foreign policy. The project was sponsored by the German Press Office and the Haniel Foundation until April 2012. Since May 2012, the Federal Foreign Office (Germany), BMW Foundation Herbert Quandt, the German Armed Forces Association, BP and Allianz Cultural Foundation have all sponsored the project.

The blog Deutschlands Agenda was officially launched on August 8 and has published numerous articles since then, including one from the Federal Foreign Office (Germany) Guido Westerwelle, and another from Thomas de Maizière, the Federal Ministry of Defense (Germany). The Deutschlands Agenda featured themes reflecting topical issues. While the vigorous debates on Afghanistan continued to persist until the theme reached its end in January 2012, the next theme entitled "Germany in the EU" took place in the following month.

== Other Services ==
- Besides the Atlantic Community, Global Must Reads and Deutschlands Agenda, the Atlantic Initiative occasionally conducts studies (for the Foreign Office (Germany), inter alia) and coordinates programs and events in partnership with other institutes and organizations such as the American German Business Club.
- Surveys have also been conducted for different organizations, including NATO.
- The Atlantic Initiative worked together with the newspaper BILD in 2010 to transmit greeting commentaries from its readership to the German armed forces deployed in Afghanistan. A summary of the letters was directly sent to their military base. The German Minister of Defense at the time Karl-Theodor zu Guttenberg embraced the atlantic-community.org's campaign stating that it was a "great community initiative from the Atlantic Initiative and BILD. Our soldiers more than deserve the broad and visible support."
- The Atlantic Initiative also provides internships for students.

== See also ==
- Atlantik Brücke e.V.
- German Council on Foreign Relations
