= Andreas Meyer-Landrut =

German diplomat (born 1929)

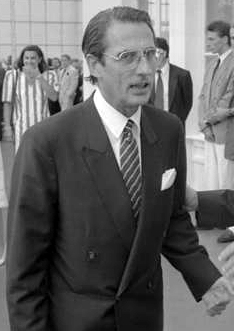
- Andreas Meyer-Landrut in Bonn, July 1989

German Ambassador to the Soviet Union
- In office 1980–1983
- In office 1987–1989

Personal details
- Born: 31 May 1929 (age 96) Tallinn, Estonia
- Relatives: Lena Meyer-Landrut (granddaughter); Nikolaus Meyer-Landrut (cousin)

Andreas Meyer-Landrut (born 31 May 1929) is a former German diplomat. He was West Germany's ambassador to the Soviet Union in Moscow from 1980 to 1983 and again from 1987 to 1989. He also served as the chief of staff to the office of the President of Germany during the presidency of Richard von Weizsäcker from 1989 to 1994.

== Early life ==
Andreas Meyer-Landrut was born on 31 May 1929 in Tallinn, Estonia. He and his family, Baltic German industrialists, were relocated from Estonia to occupied Poland at the beginning of World War II because of the Molotov–Ribbentrop Pact. At the end of the war, the family fled westwards to Germany.

After graduating in 1950 from high school (Gymnasium) with the Abitur in Bielefeld, Germany, he studied Slavistics, Eastern European history and sociology at the University of Göttingen. He spent one year of his studies at the University of Zagreb, SR Croatia, SFR Yugoslavia, and wrote his dissertation, which focused on the Croatian theatre of the 19th century. He became Doctor of Philosophy at the University of Göttingen in 1954.

== Career ==
In 1955, Meyer-Landrut joined West Germany's Foreign Office. His assignments abroad included Brussels, Tokyo and Brazzaville, where he served as the country's ambassador. Due to his language skills, he became one of the experts on Russia in the German diplomats' corps. Five times he worked on assignments to the German embassy in Moscow. From 1980 to 1983 and again from 1987 to 1989 he served as West Germany's ambassador to the Soviet Union in Moscow. He held a key position at a time of rapprochement between the German government under Chancellor Helmut Kohl and the Soviet leader Mikhail Gorbachev during the Perestroika period. During that time he also worked on behalf of ethnic Germans in Russia.

From 1984 to 1986, he was undersecretary of the Foreign Office, serving under foreign minister Hans-Dietrich Genscher. He then worked as the chief of staff to the office of the President of Germany during the presidency of Richard von Weizsäcker from 1989 to 1994.

Following his civil service career, he managed the Moscow representation of DaimlerChrysler until 2002. He also joined the German-Russian Forum.

== Personal life ==
Meyer-Landrut was married twice. His first wife was of Hungarian nobility; they are the grandparents of the German singer Lena Meyer-Landrut, who won the 2010 edition of the Eurovision Song Contest in Oslo. German diplomat Nikolaus Meyer-Landrut is a nephew.

== Awards ==
- Great Cross of Merit with Star and shoulder ribbon, for his lifetime achievements bringing together Germans and Russians
- Order of the Cross of Terra Mariana (Estonia)

== Publications ==
- Meyer-Landrut, Andreas (2003). Mit Gott und langen Unterhosen. Erlebnisse eines Diplomaten in der Zeit des Kalten Krieges. Berlin: Quintessenz Verlag. ISBN 3-86124-573-6.
- Meyer-Landrut, Andreas (2005). "С Богом! И оденься потеплее!" – Моя дипломатическая миссия в России. Москва: Международные отношения. ISBN 5-7133-1248-8.
