= Atlantic Community =

Foreign policy initiative

The Atlantic Community was a German-American project to apply Web 2.0 ideas to transatlantic foreign policy strategy. Launched in April 2007 as an undertaking of the Atlantic Initiative, the Atlantic Community aims at facilitating discussion between young thinkers and established members of the foreign policy realm in order to increase participation in a system that, in Europe, is often closed off to the public at large. The Advisory Board of the Atlantic Community is non-partisan, and includes journalist Marvin Kalb, UK Liberal Democrat Lord Wallace, and German diplomat Jürgen Chrobog as members. In January 2009 the Atlantic Community was selected as a "Landmark in the Land of Ideas" by Germany: Land of Ideas. Germany: Land of Ideas is a shared initiative of the German government, commerce, and industry under the patronage of former Federal President Horst Köhler.

== Mission ==
Atlantic Community has more than 7000 members, including future policymakers, think-tankers, journalists, academics, students, and active citizens. Its mission is to encourage open and democratic dialogue on the challenges facing Europe and North America while also giving a voice to a new generation of thinkers. Young leaders are provided the opportunity to publish and debate side by side with established experts, and to have their policy ideas seen by senior officials.

The members of the Atlantic Community can share and discuss their ideas by posting op-eds, research, and comments on the website. The best analysis and policy recommendations are summarized in Atlantic Memos that are presented to decision makers in NATO and EU countries.

== Activities ==
The main feature of the Atlantic Community is the Policy Workshop, where new commentary is published from think-tankers, journalists and decision makers working in subjects which are relevant to the transatlantic partners. Among contributors to the Workshops were Eckart von Klaeden, Minister of State at the German Chancellery, Karsten D. Voigt, the Coordinator for German-American Cooperation in the German Foreign Office, Julianne Smith of the American think tank CSIS, and current Chatham House director Robin Niblett. Members of the Atlantic Community then comment on these strategies and add their own ideas below the original article. The finished product, called an Executive Summary, is a one-page policy memo in PDF format that summarizes the netroots suggestions and discussion from the community.

In 2011 Atlantic Community celebrated the tenth anniversary of UN Resolution 1325 by launching an op-ed competition "Women on Transatlantic Security". The initiative was sponsored by the NATO Public Diplomacy Division and the United States Mission to NATO. The competition aimed at empowering young women working in the peace and security areas and encouraging them to participate in debates on international security issues.

The next two Policy Workshop competitions were "Ideas with Impact: Students Advise Decision Makers" and "Your Ideas, Your NATO", which took place respectively in May 2011 and May 2012 in Berlin. The former Policy Workshop competition focused on policy recommendations on Iran, Russia and climate change; the winners of the competition presented their policy proposals to Philip D. Murphy, the US Ambassador to Germany, CDU/CSU Foreign Policy Spokesman Philipp Mißfelder and their policy advisers. The latter competition concentrated on NATO values, NATO partnerships after the Arab Spring, and Smart Defense; the competition winners presented their policy recommendations to Philip D. Murphy and Parliamentary State Secretary to the Federal Minister of Defense Christian Schmidt (CSU).

The most recent competition was "Shaping Our NATO: Young Voices on the Warsaw Summit 2016". It focused on encouraging students and recent graduates under 28 years of age to produce innovative solutions to either contemporary or future problems. The four categories ranged from how NATO can increase solidarity amongst its members, to suggesting ways that the Alliance should learn from its mistakes and adapt to change.

Apart from competitions and workshops, Atlantic Community provides daily top press commentaries, regular up-dates on the best of think-tanks' publications, and conducts expert surveys. For example, in April 2010 the think tank carried out a NATO sponsored survey of Russian experts aimed at gauging the path of NATO-Russia relations.

Jimmy Wales, the founder of the Wikipedia, was featured among the decision makers interviewed by the Atlantic Community.

== Deutschlands Agenda ==
The German-language blog Deutschlands Agenda is the most recent project of the Atlantic Initiative, launched in November 2011. Like atlantic-community.org, this platform concentrates on foreign policy; however, it especially aims to raise awareness as well as strengthen the debate on German foreign policy issues. In an ever more connected world, foreign policy factors have to be taken into account while making national policy decisions. By explaining these interactions as well as initiating a discussion on the topic between citizens, politicians and opinion leaders, Deutschlands Agenda looks to accustom citizens to the global context of decisions. By appealing especially to the younger generation and the blogging community, it not only wishes to deepen citizen participation, but also to actively and sustainably frame the German political dialogue and to eventually create a strong strategic community in Germany. Like atlantic-community.org, Deutschlands Agenda will condense fruitful discussions into executive briefings (Memos) and send them for consideration to key decision makers.

== Sources ==
- Women on Transatlantic Security, NATO News June 30, 2011
- Broadening the Security Debate - Transatlantic Issues World Policy Institute, February 8, 2011,
- Game, Reset and Good Match?, NATO Review, April 2010
- The Wiki Way to Create Change in Global Politics Atlantic Community, February 23, 2010
- Johannes Bohnen BMW Stiftung

German-language publications

- Das sind die besten Denkfabriken der Welt, Die Welt, May 4, 2011
- Die Nutzwerker, brand eins, July 2010
- Was genau ist die Atlantische Initiative?, BILD, July 22, 2010
- Denkfabrik 2.0, Frankfurter Allgemeine hochschulanzeiger, November 16, 2009
- Ein "Facebook" fuer Aussenpolitik?, Frankfurter Allgemeine, February 26, 2009
