= Rudolf Dreßler =

German politician and diplomat (1940–2025)

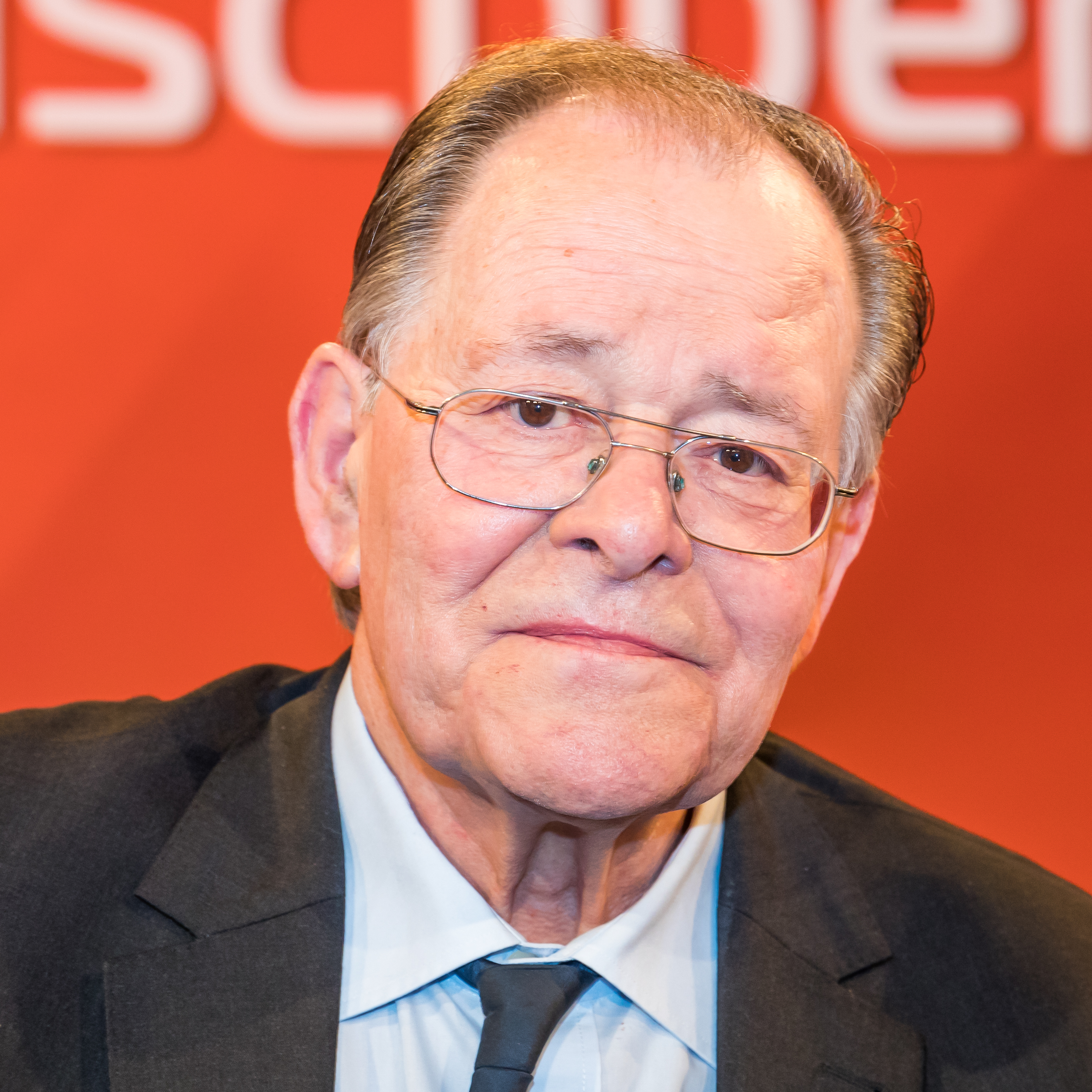
- Dreßler, 2018

German Ambassador to Israel
- In office 1 September 2000 – 31 August 2005
- Preceded by: Theodor Wallau
- Succeeded by: Harald Kindermann

Parliamentary State Secretary in the Ministry of Labour and Social Affairs
- In office 28 April 1982 – 1 October 1982
- Chancellor: Helmut Schmidt
- Minister: Heinz Westphal
- Preceded by: Hermann Buschfort
- Succeeded by: Wolfgang Vogt

Member of the Bundestag for Wuppertal I
- In office 4 November 1980 – 31 August 2000
- Preceded by: Adolf Scheu
- Succeeded by: Ulrich Kelber

Personal details
- Born: 17 November 1940 Wuppertal, Gau Düsseldorf, Germany
- Died: 8 January 2025 (aged 84)
- Party: Social Democratic Party (1969–2025)
- Occupation: Politician; typesetter; Journalist
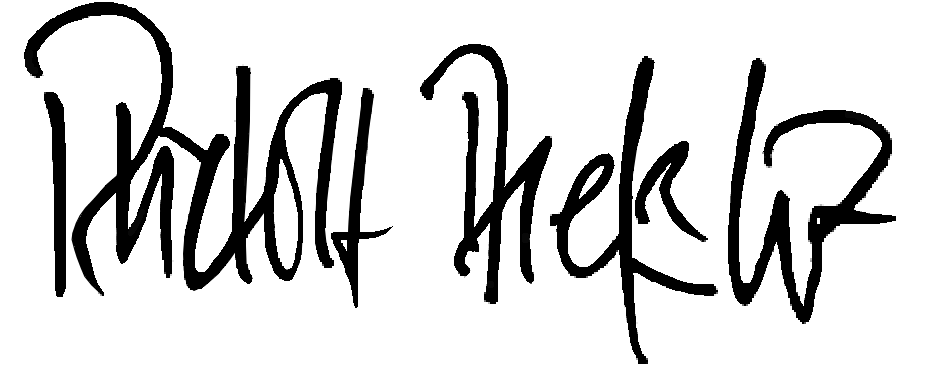
- Signature

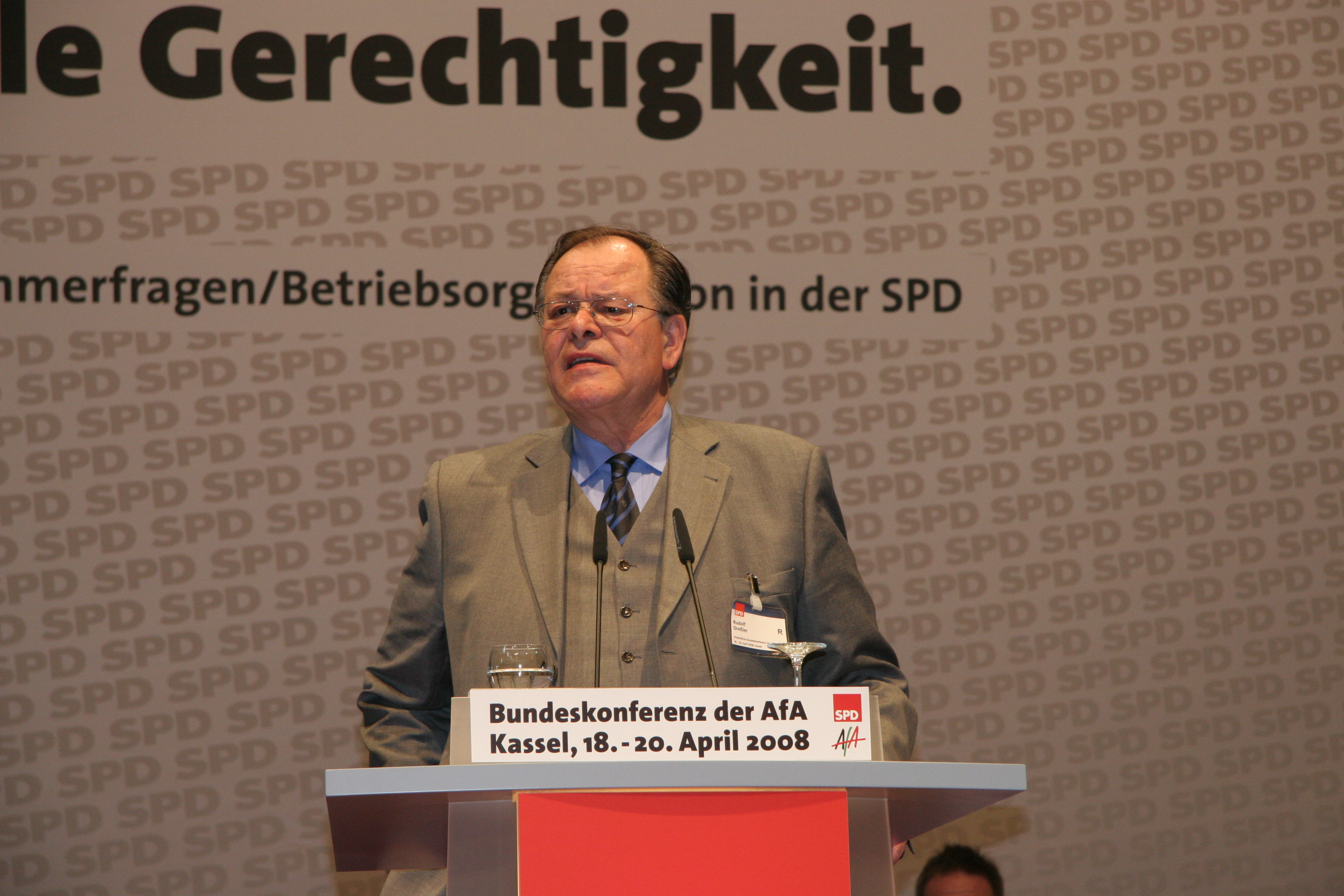
Rudolf Dreßler at AfA-Bundeskongress 2008 in Kassel

Rudolf Dreßler (17 November 1940 – 8 January 2025) was a German politician and diplomat.

== Early life and career ==
Born in 1940, the son of a German who resisted Adolf Hitler, Dreßler grew up in Sprockhövel and went to school in Wuppertal. He was an apprentice at a printer company and worked then for different newspapers. From 1969 to 1981 he was a member of the work council of the newspaper Westdeutsche Zeitung (WAZ). From 1974 to 1983, he was a member of the Printing and Paper Union.

== Political career ==
Since 1969 Dreßler was a member of the Social Democratic Party of Germany (SPD).

From 1980 to 2000, Dreßler was a member of German Bundestag, representing the Wuppertal I district. In 1982, he briefly served as Parliamentary State Secretary at the Federal Ministry of Labour and Social Affairs, in this capacity assisting minister Heinz Westphal. From 1987 to 2002, he served as deputy chair of the SPD parliamentary group, under the leadership of successive chairmen Hans-Jochen Vogel, Hans-Ulrich Klose, Rudolf Scharping and Peter Struck.

From 2000 to 2005, Dreßler served as German ambassador in Israel. During this time, he coined the phrase that "Israel's security is part of German raison d'état." He wrote these words in a 2005 article for the Federal Agency for Civic Education. Later, then-Chancellor Angela Merkel (CDU) reiterated this principle in a speech to the Kneset.

In February 2023, Dreßler was one of the first signatories of a petition initiated by Sahra Wagenknecht and Alice Schwarzer calling for an end to military support for Ukraine in the wake of the Russian invasion of Ukraine.

== Personal life ==
Dreßler married three times and had two children.

On 11 November 1997, he had a car accident near Bonn.

Dreßler died on 8 January 2025, at the age of 84.

== Awards ==
- 1988: Commanders Crosses of the Order of Merit of the Federal Republic of Germany
