= Alexander Graf Lambsdorff =

German politician (born 1966)

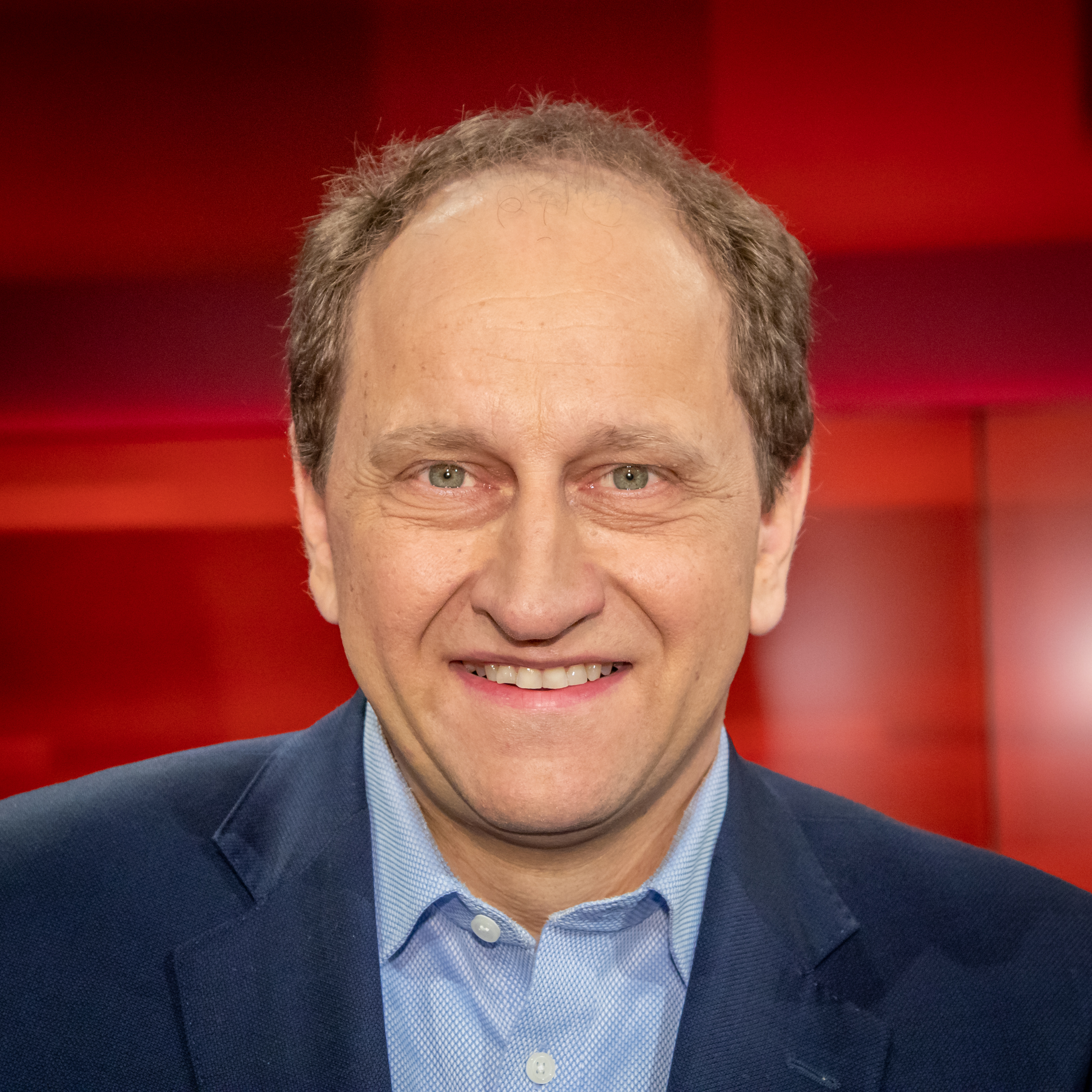

Member of the Bundestag for North Rhine-Westphalia
- In office 24 October 2017 – 8 July 2023
- Succeeded by: Katharina Willkomm
- Constituency: FDP List

Member of the European Parliament for Germany
- In office 1 July 2004 – 2017

Personal details
- Born: Alexander Sebastian Léonce von der Wenge Graf Lambsdorff; 5 November 1966 (age 60) Cologne, West Germany (now Germany)
- Party: Free Democratic Party
- Spouse: Franziska Gräfin Lambsdorff
- Children: 2
- Education: University of Bonn; Georgetown University
- Website: Official website

Alexander Sebastian Léonce von der Wenge Graf Lambsdorff (born 5 November 1966), commonly known as Alexander Graf Lambsdorff is a German diplomat and politician of the Free Democratic Party of Germany (FDP), part of the Alliance of Liberals and Democrats for Europe.

Lambsdorff has been serving as the German ambassador to Israel since 2026. From 2023 to 2026, he was the German ambassador to Russia. Previously, he served as a Member of the Bundestag from 2017 to 2023 and as Member of the European Parliament from 2004 to 2017.

A member of the former noble Lambsdorff family, his name reflects an Imperial Russian comital title.

== Early life and education ==
Lambsdorff grew up in Hamburg, Brussels, and Bonn, attending the Catholic Academic High School Aloisiuskolleg at Bonn-Bad Godesberg until 1985, before going up to the University of Bonn.

From 1991 until 1993, Lambsdorff studied at Georgetown University on a Fulbright Scholarship graduating as a MA in history and an MS in Foreign Service (1993).

== Diplomatic career ==
After diplomatic training, Lambsdorff served on the German Policy Planning Staff (together with Jorgo Chatzimarkakis, his contemporary and fellow FDP MEP) before becoming director of the Bundestag office of former German Foreign Minister Klaus Kinkel, after the FDP left government in 1998.

- 1994: Trainee, European Commission
- 1994–95: Friedrich Naumann Foundation, Baltic States Office, Tallinn
- 1997–2000: Policy Planning Staff in the German Federal Foreign Office (German: Auswärtiges Amt)
- 2000–03: Press Attaché, Embassy of Germany, Washington, D.C.
- 2003–04: Political Department, Russia Desk in the German Federal Foreign Office

== Political career ==
=== Member of the European Parliament, 2004–2017 ===
Lambsdorff was first elected to the European Parliament in 2004 and was confirmed in 2009 and 2014. Held in high regard, he was widely viewed as a possible successor to Graham Watson as leader of the Alliance of Liberals and Democrats for Europe Group in the parliament, but the post went instead to Guy Verhofstadt. From 2011, Lambsdorff chaired the 12-member German FDP delegation in the European Parliament, before subsequently being elected Leader of the European Liberals and Democrats Group in 2014.

Until 2014, Lambsdorff served as member of the European Parliament's Committee on Foreign Affairs and the EU-Delegation for relations with the People's Republic of China. He also served as a deputy on the European Parliament Committee on Culture and Education and on the Delegation to the EU-Turkey Joint Parliamentary Committee DACP as well as the ACP–EU Joint Parliamentary Assembly. During his tenure, he steered efforts to create a single EU-market for Defence and Security-related equipment as parliamentary rapporteur in 2009. In 2010, he joined the Friends of the EEAS, an unofficial and independent pressure group formed because of concerns that the High Representative of the Union for Foreign Affairs and Security Policy Catherine Ashton was not paying sufficient attention to the Parliament and was sharing too little information on the formation of the European External Action Service.

Following the 2014 elections to the European Parliament, Lambsdorff became a member of the European Parliament Committee on International Trade. In this capacity, he has served as the parliament's rapporteur on the EU's agreement on the participation of Croatia in the European Economic Area.

Lambsdorff has led EU-Election Observer Missions on numerous occasions: as head of the EU-Election Observation Mission during the 2007–08 Kenyan crisis, he described the presidential elections as "flawed". Other elections he has overseen include the Bangladeshi general election in 2008, the first free Guinean presidential elections in 2010 and the Myanma general election in 2015.

In January 2014, at the FDP Convention in Bonn, Lambsdorff was elected as his party's lead candidate for the European Parliament elections receiving a resounding 86.2% of the vote.

From 2014, Lambsdorff served as one of the fourteen Vice Presidents of the European Parliament who sit in for the president in presiding over the plenary. In this capacity, he was also in charge of representing the parliament at multilateral bodies, including the United Nations and the World Trade Organization, as well as of the parliament's contacts with European business associations. In addition, he was a member of the Democracy Support and Election Coordination Group (DEG), which oversees the Parliament's election observation missions.

=== Member of the German Bundestag, 2017–2023 ===
Lambsdorff was a member of the German Bundestag from the 2017 national elections until 2023. Throughout his time in parliament, he served as one of six deputy chairpersons of the FDP parliamentary group under the leadership of its successive chairs Christian Lindner (2017–2021) and Christian Dürr (since 2021), where he oversaw the group's activities on foreign policy. From 2022, he also was a member of the Parliamentary Oversight Panel (PKGr), which provides parliamentary oversight of Germany's intelligence services BND, BfV and MAD.

In addition, Lambsdorff chaired the German-Israeli Parliamentary Friendship Group.

=== Roles within the FDP ===
- Founding Member of the FDP LV Net
- Member of the North Rhine-Westphalia Executive Committee
- Member of the Federal Executive Committee
- Member of the ELDR Council and Congress

Following the 2017 state elections in North Rhine-Westphalia, Lambsdorff was part of the FDP team in the negotiations with Armin Laschet's CDU on a coalition agreement. He led his party's delegation in the working group on European affairs; his co-chair of the CDU was Matthias Kerkhoff.

In the negotiations to form a so-called traffic light coalition of the Social Democrats (SPD), the Green Party and the FDP following the 2021 federal elections, Lambsdorff led his party's delegation in the working group on foreign policy, defence, development cooperation and human rights; his co-chairs from the other parties were Heiko Maas and Omid Nouripour.

== German Ambassador to Russia ==
In March 2024, Lambsdorff – alongside other EU ambassadors – attended the funeral of opposition leader Alexei Navalny. Also in March 2024, Russia's foreign ministry summoned Lambsdorff again after Russian media published an audio recording of senior German military officials discussing weapons for Ukraine and a potential strike by Kyiv on a bridge in Crimea.

In February 2026, Der Spiegel reported that Lambsdorff would be dispatched to Tel Aviv in the coming summer, replacing Steffen Seibert. According to Der Spiegel, Lambsdorff would be succeeded in Moscow by the Ambassador to Mexico since 2024, Clemens von Goetze.

== Political positions ==
=== European integration ===
Lambsdorff has become increasingly critical of an accession of Turkey to the European Union and publicly declared that accession talks should be suspended until the Turkish government returns to the direction of the EU. In 2011, he accused Prime Minister Recep Tayyip Erdoğan of using "gunboat rhetoric" in his statements about Israel, adding that "with a strident anti-Israel course, it isn't making any friends in Europe." On the 2014 post-election protests in Turkey, he commented: "There are more journalists in jail [in Turkey] than in China or Iran and now the Prime Minister wants to close down YouTube and Twitter because people are saying things he doesn't like." When Erdoğan, then in his position as President of Turkey, disparaged German president Joachim Gauck as a "pastor" in 2014, Lambsdorff demanded that "the negotiations [on EU accession] should be put in a deep freeze."

Following British Prime Minister David Cameron's veto of EU-wide treaty change to tackle the European debt crisis in 2011, Lambsdorff was quoted by German weekly Der Spiegel as saying: "It was a mistake to admit the British into the European Union."

When Chancellor Angela Merkel's government opted in 2011 to abstain from United Nations Security Council Resolution 1973 authorizing military force against Libya, Lambsdorff publicly criticized his fellow FDP member and then Germany's Foreign Minister Guido Westerwelle, arguing that "Germany's vote has weakened the EU."

=== Human rights ===
Along with his fellow parliamentarians Marietje Schaake, Ramon Tremosa and members of the Greens/EFA group, Lambsdorff nominated Leyla Yunus, imprisoned Azerbaijani human rights activist and director of the Institute of Peace and Democracy, for the 2014 Sakharov Prize.

=== Economic policy ===
As a consequence of the European debt crisis, Lambsdorff told the Financial Times Deutschland in 2012 that it might make sense to give the European Commissioner for Economic and Monetary Affairs greater influence over euro-zone countries' budgets.

Following the 2014 European elections, Lambsdorff openly rejected Pierre Moscovici's nomination as European Commissioner for Economic and Financial Affairs, Taxation and Customs, stating that Moscovici should be held accountable for France's rising deficit and worsening economic situation.

=== Language ===
In December 2014, Lambsdorff proposed that the English language should be mastered by servants of the public administration, and should later become an official language of Germany, in addition to German. According to Lambsdorff, as experienced in other countries with a good knowledge of English in public institutions, this should help to attract more skilled migrants to prevent labor shortage, to ease business for investors and to establish a more welcoming culture. As evaluated by a representative YouGov survey, 59 percent of all Germans would welcome the establishment of English as an official language in the whole European Union.

== Other activities ==
=== Corporate boards ===
- Deutsche Gesellschaft für Internationale Zusammenarbeit (GIZ), Member of the Board of Trustees

=== Non-profit organizations ===
- Tarabya Cultural Academy, Member of the advisory board (since 2022)
- Trilateral Commission, Member of the European Group (since 2021)
- German Council on Foreign Relations (DGAP), Member of the Presidium (since 2019)
- Development and Peace Foundation (SEF), Member of the Board of Trustees (since 2019)
- German Association for Small and Medium-Sized Businesses (BVMW), Member of the Political Advisory Board (since 2018)
- Berlin office of the American Jewish Committee (AJC), Member of the Advisory Board
- Atlantik-Brücke, Member of the Board
- Atlantic Initiative, Founding Member
- Bonn International Award for Democracy, Member of the Board of Trustees
- Broader European Leadership Agenda (BELA), Member of the Advisory Board
- Cercle de Lorraine, Member
- Europa-Union Deutschland, Member
- European Council on Foreign Relations (ECFR), Member
- European Security Foundation, Member of the Board of Trustees
- Friedrich Naumann Foundation, Member of the Board of Trustees
- German Institute for International and Security Affairs (SWP), Member of the council (since 2018)
- German-Turkish Foundation, Founding Member
- Petersburger Dialog, Member
- Haus der Geschichte, Member of the Board of Trustees (2022–2023)
- International Journalists' Programmes (IJP), Member of the Board of Trustees
- European Endowment for Democracy (EED), Member of the Board of Governors (-2017)
- German European Security Association (GESA), Member (2006–2015)

== Personal life ==
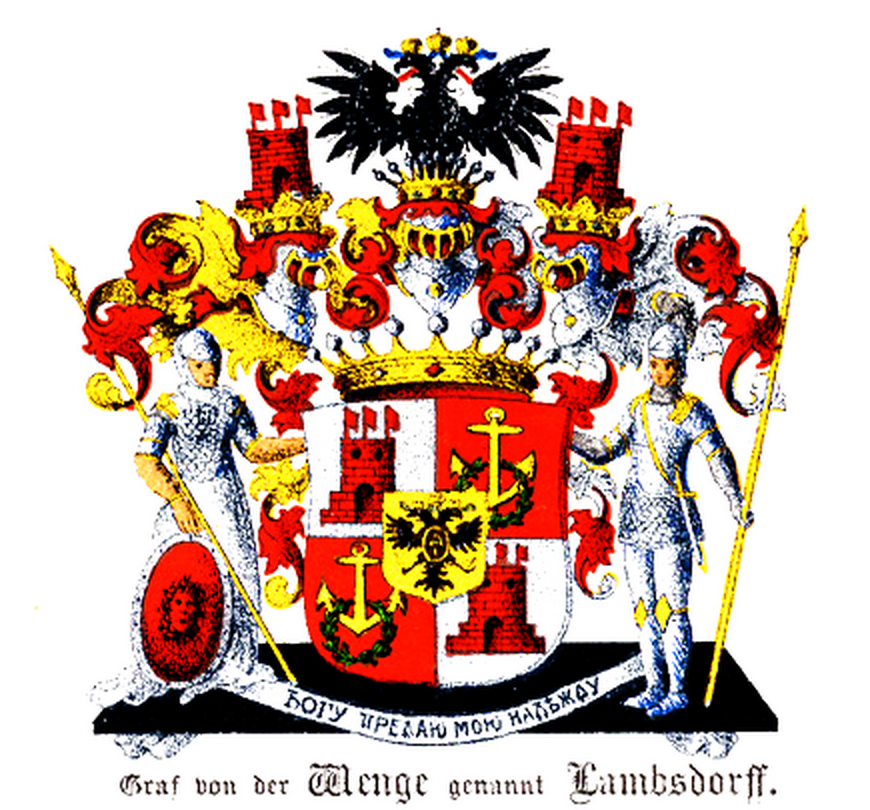
Coat of Arms of the Lambsdorff family

Count Alexander Lambsdorff is a member of the Baltic branch of the noble Lambsdorff family; his family branch emigrated from Westphalia to the Baltic region in the early 15th century and was recognised as noble in Courland in 1620. The family owned large estates in modern-day Latvia and Estonia, and family members distinguished themselves as military officers in the service of the Russian Empire. One of Alexander Lambsdorff's ancestors, Count Matthias von der Wenge Lambsdorff, was a Russian general and was conferred the hereditary comital title in 1817 by Alexander I of Russia. In 1880 the family was authorised by royal licence to use the titles Baron of the Wenge and Count of Lambsdorff in the Kingdom of Prussia. His father, Hagen Graf Lambsdorff (born 1935), was the first German Ambassador to Latvia from 1991 and later Ambassador to the Czech Republic from 1999 to 2001; his uncle, Otto Graf Lambsdorff (1926–2009), was a prominent liberal politician and Federal Minister for Economic Affairs from 1977 to 1982.

In 1994, Lambsdorff married Franziska von Klitzing, daughter of Werner von Klitzing (1934-2022) and his wife, Princess Osterlind of Wied, by whom he has two children.
