= Helge Lindh =

German politician (born 1976)

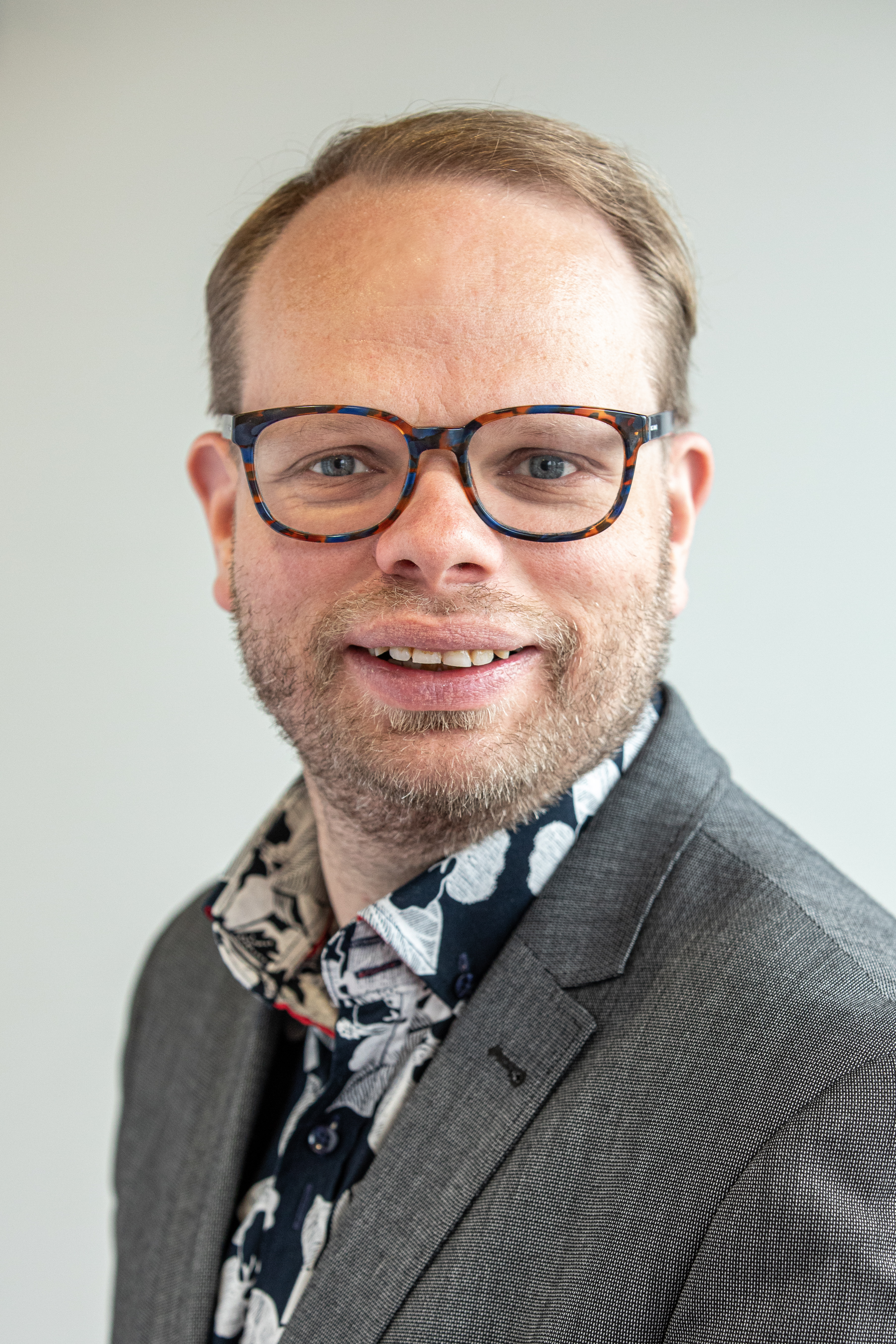
- Lindh in 2019

Member of the Bundestag
- Incumbent
- Assumed office 2017

Personal details
- Born: Helge Frederik Lindh; 6 December 1976 (age 49) Wuppertal, West Germany (now Germany)
- Party: SPD

Helge Frederik Lindh (born 6 December 1976) is a German politician of the Social Democratic Party (SPD) who has been serving as a member of the Bundestag since 2017, representing the Wuppertal I district.

== Political career ==
Lindh became a member of the Bundestag in the 2017 German federal election. In parliament, he is a member of the Committee for Cultural Affairs and Media and the Committee for Internal Affairs. He serves as his parliamentary group’s rapporteur on antisemitism.

Since the 2021 elections, Lindh has been serving as his parliamentary group’s spokesperson for cultural affairs and media.

Within the SPD parliamentary group, Lindh belongs to the Parliamentary Left, a left-wing movement.

== Other activities ==
- German Federal Cultural Foundation, Member of the Board of Trustees (since 2022)
- German Federal Film Board (FFA), Member of the Supervisory Board (since 2022)
- Memorial to the Murdered Jews of Europe Foundation, Member of the Board of Trustees (since 2022)
- Haus der Geschichte, Alternate Member of the Board of Trustees (since 2022)
- German Historical Museum (DHM), Member of the Board of Trustees
- Federal Agency for Civic Education (BPB), Alternate Member of the Board of Trustees (since 2018)
- Bündnis für Demokratie und Toleranz, Member of the Advisory Board
