= Otto Schmidt (CDU) =

German politician

Otto Anton Ferdinand Herbert Schmidt
- Born: 1 August 1902; Cologne
- Died: 12 December 1984 (aged 82); Sinzig
- Occupation: Politician

Otto Anton Ferdinand Herbert Schmidt (1 August 1902 – 12 December 1984) was a German politician of the CDU. He was mayor of Wuppertal and a longtime member of the Landtag of North Rhine-Westphalia and the German Bundestag.

== Life ==
Otto Schmidt was born on 1 August 1902, the oldest of four children. After studying law and economics at the universities of Rostock, Leipzig, Munich and Cologne, he became a court clerk in 1924 court clerk. In 1925 he earned his doctorate of law, and became an assistant judge in 1928. From 1938 he worked as an attorney in his father's practice, Dr. Otto Schmidt Verlag, and became partner in 1940. From 1930 he also worked as a lawyer in Cologne. In 1944 he was called for military service. Schmidt ended the war as a prisoner.

== See also ==
- List of German Christian Democratic Union politicians
