= Embassy of Germany, Tel Aviv =

Coordinates: 32°4′28.63″N 34°46′59.61″E

Embassy of Germany, Tel Aviv

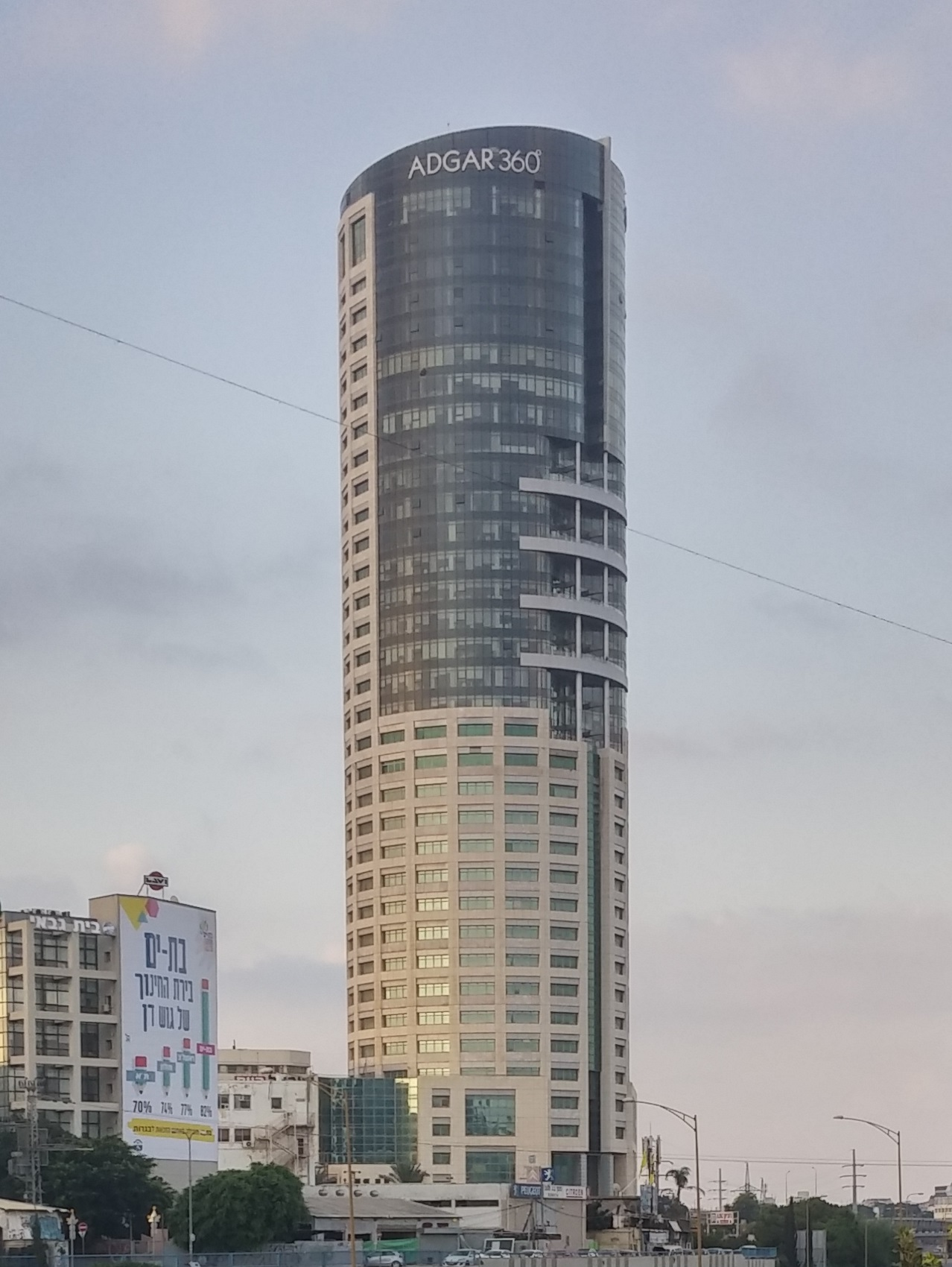
- Adgar 360 tower, where the embassy is located
- Location: Tel Aviv, Israel
- Address: 2 Hashlosha Street, Tel Aviv, Israel
- Ambassador: Steffen Seibert

The Embassy of Germany in Tel Aviv is Germany's diplomatic mission to Israel.

== Location and functions ==
Since April 2022, the embassy is located at 2 Hashlosha Street, Tel Aviv. The embassy is also home to a consulate, various departments and a military attaché.

The embassy formerly was located at 3 Daniel Frisch Street, Tel Aviv.

== List of ambassadors ==
1. 1965–1968 Rolf Friedemann Pauls
2. 1968–1971 Karl Hermann Knoke
3. 1971–1974 Jesco von Puttkamer
4. 1974–1977 Per Fischer
5. 1977–1981 Klaus Schütz
6. 1981–1985 Niels Hansen
7. 1985–1990 Wilhelm Haas
8. 1990–1993 Otto von der Gablentz
9. 1993–1996 Franz Bertele
10. 1996–2000 Theodor Wallau
11. 2000–2005 Rudolf Dreßler
12. 2006–2011 Harald Kindermann
13. 2011–2015 Andreas Michaelis
14. 2015–2018 Clemens von Goetze
15. 2018–2022: Susanne Wasum-Rainer
16. 2022–2026: Steffen Seibert
17. since 2026: Alexander Graf Lambsdorff

== See also ==
- List of diplomatic missions in Israel
