= Anja Liebert =

German politician (born 1969)

Member of the Bundestag
- Incumbent
- Assumed office 26 October 2021

Personal details
- Born: 19 September 1969 (age 56) Dortmund, Germany
- Party: Alliance 90/The Greens

Anja Liebert (born 19 September 1969) is a German politician. Liebert became a member of the Bundestag in the 2021 German federal election. She is affiliated with the Alliance 90/The Greens party.

== Positions ==
Liebert is particularly concerned about the mobility transition. She said: "We urgently need investment in local public transport in order to achieve the climate targets. The car lobby is only focusing on other technology, but doesn't want to change the system. The mobility of the future is networked. The question must be: What is the best way to get from A to B? At the moment, it's more like: where is the car parked for 23 hours a day?".
