= Manfred Todtenhausen =

German politician

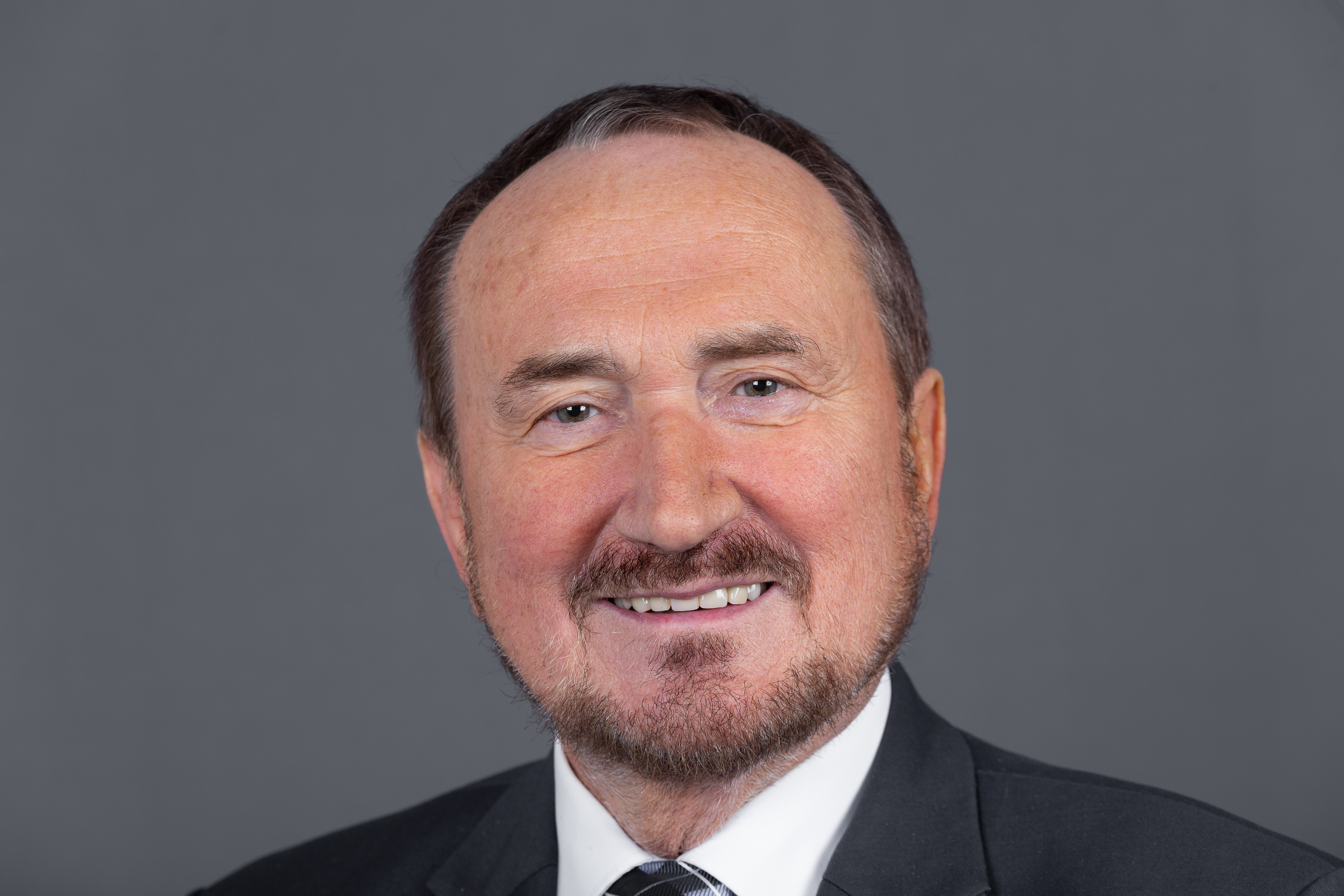
- Manfred Todtenhausen in 2020

Member of the Bundestag
- In office 2017–2025

Personal details
- Born: 8 December 1950 (age 75) Wuppertal, West Germany (now Germany)
- Party: FDP

Manfred Todtenhausen (born 8 December 1950) is a German politician of the Free Democratic Party (FDP) who served as a member of the Bundestag from the state of North Rhine-Westphalia from 2012 to 2013 and from 2017 to 2025.

== Early life and career ==
After attending school, Todtenhausen trained as an electrician from 1966 to 1970. He did his military service from 1970 to 1972 in Wolfenbüttel and Braunschweig. From 1972 to 1977 he was a journeyman in his training company. From 1977 he attended the master school at the HWK Düsseldorf, which he completed in 1978 as a master electrician. Afterwards he was plant manager and concession holder at an electrical company in Wuppertal until 1981. From 1981 to 1988 Todtenhausen was a self-employed master electrician, since 1988 he has been master electrician and managing director of Elektro Todtenhausen GmbH.

== Political career ==
Todtenhausen has been a member of the FDP since 2002. He became a member of the Bundestag after the 2017 German federal election. In parliament, he was a member of the Petitions Committee and the Committee for Economy and Energy. He was a deputy member of the Committee for construction, housing, urban development and municipalities. He was his parliamentary group's spokesman for petitions.

In 2024, Todtenhausen announced that he is not seeking re-election for Bundestag.
