= Yossi Sassi =

Israeli musician (born 1975)

Yossi Sassi יוסי סאסי
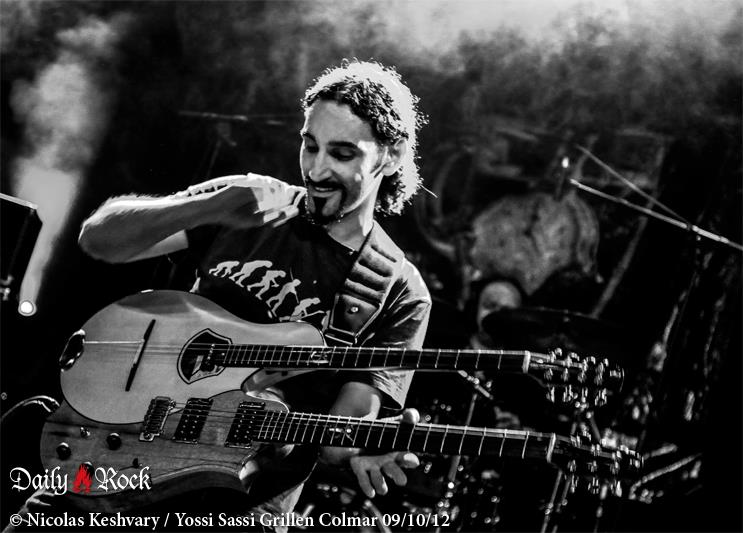
- Sassi with his Bouzoukitara in 2013

Background information
- Born: 5 February 1975 (age 50)
- Genres: Art rock; oriental metal; progressive rock; progressive metal
- Occupations: Musician; producer; composer
- Instruments: Guitar; bouzouki; "bouzoukitara"; saz; oud; cümbüş; charrango; mandolin; et al
- Years active: 1991–present
- Member of: Yossi Sassi & the Oriental Rock Orchestra
- Formerly of: Orphaned Land
- Website: yossisassi.com

Yossi Sassi (Hebrew: יוסי סאסי; born 5 February 1975) is an Israeli guitarist and producer who merges traditional and contemporary music. He is the inventor of the "bouzoukitara" musical instrument. He is known for pioneering oriental rock, as well as being the main composer, arranger, and co-founder of Orphaned Land, an Israeli progressive metal band formed in 1991. He also formed the Yossi Sassi Band/The Oriental Rock Orchestra. His debut solo album, Melting Clocks, got him voted "Top Newcomer of 2012" by Rock Hard magazine readers. His 2016 album Roots and Roads was submitted for Grammy Award consideration.

== Early years ==
Sassi grew up in Petah Tikva, Israel. His father was a firefighter who enjoyed singing, and his mother was a housewife. Sassi's father, David, comes from a family of ten brothers and sisters, all of whom play an instrument, sing, or do both. His grandfather and namesake, Yossef Sassi, played the oud and chanted traditional religious songs. At age seven, Sassi learned to play the flute, and later sang in the school choir, and his interest in music grew when he encountered the guitar around the age of 14 during a visit to his uncle. Sassi borrowed the guitar, took some lessons from guitar teachers, but eventually decided to teach himself, practicing for eight to ten hours per day for years. He dropped out of high school at age 17 to focus on his band Orphaned Land, combining Middle Eastern elements with metal music.

== Career ==
Sassi blends East with West, rock with world music, melodic tunes with progressive passages, and traditional folk instruments with electric riffs. He has over 20 years of experience as a producer, composer-arranger, and musician.

Yossi plays 17 different types of guitars and traditional instruments, and has been invited to play live and share the stage with artists such as Metallica, Marty Friedman, Steven Wilson, Yehuda Poliker, and others.

Yossi Sassi is a first-level endorsing artist of PRS Guitars, Engl Amps, Elixir Strings, and Electro-Harmonix.

=== Orphaned Land ===
Unusual for a band from Israel, Orphaned Land has built a following among Muslims and Arabs.

Founded in 1991, the band released the demo The Beloved's Cry in 1992. They were signed by Holy Records and Sahara (1994) and El Norra Alila (1996) were well received by reviewers. Later, the band signed with Century Media USA and released Mabool in 2004, garnering over 250,000 copies in sales.

The band's 2010 release, titled The Never Ending Way of ORWarriOR, was recommended by Kirk Hammett of Metallica in Metal Hammer magazine.

On 6 January 2014, Sassi released an official statement in which he announced his decision to part ways with his life work in Orphaned Land, due to various reasons, and focus on "new dreams" and "creative, innovative, authentic music that unites people".

=== Solo career ===
In 2011, Sassi founded his own solo group, with musicians from various genres, including Ben Azar on guitars (jazz/fusion guitarist), Shay Ifrah on drums, and Or Lubianiker (Project R'n'L, Marty Friedman) on bass guitar. In his solo work, Sassi merges rock with traditional folk music, blending instrumental pieces with melodic vocals. Yossi's debut release as a solo artist was titled Melting Clocks. The album incorporates traditional instruments such as the saz, bouzouki, oud, cümbüş, and others.

In 2014, Sassi was featured on the IGNEA single "Petrichor".

In January 2014, Sassi announced his sophomore album, Desert Butterflies, a conceptual piece continuing where he left off with Melting Clocks. The album includes musical collaborations with Ron "Bumblefoot" Thal (ex-Guns N' Roses), Marty Friedman (ex-Megadeth), Mariangela Demurtas (Tristania), and more. Desert Butterflies was released in May 2014 worldwide and welcomed with positive reviews from Prog magazine. His third album, Roots and Roads, was released on 25 May 2016, and was later submitted to the 2016 Grammys. Sassi's fourth studio release, titled Illusion of Choice, came out in 2018 under the moniker Yossi Sassi & The Oriental Rock Orchestra, and features Haken's frontman, Ross Jennings, and Israeli singer Ester Rada.

In 2021, Yossi Sassi & the Oriental Rock Orchestra released the album Hear and Dare.

== Bouzoukitara ==
In 2011, Sassi decided to create an instrument that would later become an "embodiment of his musical journey". What first began as seeking an efficient way to switch between his acoustic Greek bouzouki to his electric guitar gave birth to the "bouzoukitara", a unique instrument that combines a traditional acoustic bouzouki with an electric solid-body guitar. Together with luthier Benjamin Millar, he was able to transform his idea and design into reality. The double-neck instrument has a shared surface, so when one guitar is played, it resonates to the open strings of the other guitar, thus allowing Sassi to produce some unique sound layers.

== Solo discography ==
- Melting Clocks (2012)
- Desert Butterflies (2014)
- Roots and Roads (2016)
- Illusion of Choice (2018)
- Hear and Dare (2021)
- Prediluvian (2023)
