= The Night Siren =

Studio album by Steve Hackett
- Released: 24 March 2017
- Recorded: 2014–2017
- Studio: Various
- Genre: Progressive rock
- Length: 57:40
- Label: Inside Out Music
- Producer: Steve Hackett; Roger King; Benedict Fenner

Steve Hackett chronology
The Total Experience Live In Liverpool (2016)	The Night Siren (2017)	Wuthering Nights: Live in Birmingham (2018)

The Night Siren is the twenty-fourth studio album from English guitarist and singer-songwriter Steve Hackett, released on 24 March 2017 by Inside Out Music.

== Recording ==
Much of the album was recorded within one year; some of the material dates back from recording sessions for Hackett's previous studio album, Wolflight (2015). Hackett explained that his writing comes from a three-person team of himself, his wife Jo, and his keyboardist and co-producer Roger King, with Hackett discussing and exchanging initial music and lyric ideas with the other two. When an idea is settled upon, music would be sent to the other performers or Hackett would travel to them and have their parts recorded on location. Hackett recorded the album by means of recording straight to a computer, rather than recording from an amplifier as he likes "to be able to have a conversation over the top of it and it can still sound very heavy". By connecting his amplifier and pedal board to the computer, Hackett experiments by "trying as many different setups and sounds as possible".

The album features numerous artists and instruments from a variety of countries, including vocalists Kobi Farhi and Mīrā ‘Awaḍ, from Israel, and a sitar from India, a tar from the Middle East, the charango from Peru, which Hackett brought home after visiting the country, and the uilleann pipes from Ireland. Hackett did not intend to incorporate such elements of middle eastern and world music at first, but his interest in such music had started in the 1960s and realised the album began to take such a direction when the songs were being developed further. Parts of the album was recorded in Sardinia and Hungary, and involved a session of musicians from Iceland, Azerbaijan, Israel and Palestine working side by side, "proving that it is possible for people not to just coexist in peace but also do something extraordinary artistically together".

For the recording of "The Gift" Hackett used a guitar that had previously belonged to guitarist Gary Moore. For Hackett the guitar "sounds like him. It cries, in that way."

== Music ==
Hackett had been working on his singing "since 1981" and marks his vocals on The Night Siren as the first time he "actually felt like a vocalist" and cited the style of American singer Tim Rose as an influence. Hackett describes the album as "a bird's eye view of the world of a musical migrant ignoring borders and celebrating our common ancestry with a unity of spirit, featuring musicians, singers and instruments from all over the world. The track Behind The Smoke is close to a Camel track from their 1981 album Nude, called Docks. From territorial frontiers to walled-up gateways, boundaries often hold back the tide. But while the night siren wails, music breaches all defences".

Some sections on the album were longer than what appeared in the final version, leaving Hackett to edit them down as he noticed a "sense of let's get to the point" and had been prone to develop long sections or song introductions in the past. He intended to make a more accessible album, and after listening back to it, enjoyed making it. "Behind the Smoke" centres around the historical plight of refugees. "West to East" reflects on the effects of war and hope for a better world, and features orchestral and choral arrangements. Hackett sees the two tracks as companions to each other; the former originated from a lyric that his wife Jo came up with: "Behind the smoke it's black". Hackett's brother John Hackett plays the flute on some tracks.

"Anything But Love" contains a mixture of styles, opening with flamenco guitar to become a rock song with an electric guitar solo to finish. The change of style and joining them together in the studio was particularly demanding.

On the composition, Hackett adds, "we've got 20 people from all around the world all working together ... although it's a rock album there are some big differences." The album also contains influences from the Beatles' psychedelia phase and classic science fiction.

For the song West to East, Steve Hackett reached out to Kobi Farhi of Israeli oriental metal band Orphaned Land and asked him to provide vocals, along with Mira Awad, an Arab-Israeli who represented Israel on Eurovision 2009 with Noa, as a message of peace. In 2013, Awad guest performed on Orphaned Land's album All Is One, during which she and Farhi sang together. According to Farhi, Hackett offered to either pay him for the performance, or instead to play a guitar solo on their next album, and Farhi chose the latter. Hackett performs a guitar solo on the song Chains Fall to Gravity on Unsung Prophets and Dead Messiahs.

== Release ==
The album was released on 24 March 2017 through Inside Out Music, available on CD, a double vinyl set with a CD, a digital download, and a special edition CD and Blu-ray, featuring a 5.1 surround sound mix and a "making of" documentary.

"In the Skeleton Gallery" was released on 4 February 2017.

Hackett is supporting the album with his Genesis Revisited with Classic Hackett Tour through 2017, to commemorate the album and the fortieth anniversary of Wind & Wuthering (1976), the last Genesis studio album recorded with Hackett in the band.

== Track listing ==
No.	Title	Writer(s)	Length
1.	"Behind the Smoke"	Steve Hackett, Jo Hackett, Roger King	6:57
2.	"Martian Sea"	S. Hackett, King	4:40
3.	"Fifty Miles from the North Pole"	S. Hackett, J. Hackett, Amanda Lehmann	7:08
4.	"El Niño"	S. Hackett, King	3:51
5.	"Other Side of the Wall"	S. Hackett, J. Hackett	4:00
6.	"Anything but Love"	S. Hackett	5:56
7.	"Inca Terra"	S. Hackett, J. Hackett	5:53
8.	"In Another Life"	S. Hackett, J. Hackett, King, Troy Donockley	6:07
9.	"In the Skeleton Gallery"	S. Hackett, J. Hackett	5:09
10.	"West to East"	S. Hackett, J. Hackett	5:14
11.	"The Gift"	Leslie-Miriam Bennet, Benedict Fenner	2:45

Japanese edition
No.	Title	Writer(s)	Length
12.	"After the Ordeal"	Tony Banks, Phil Collins, Peter Gabriel, S. Hackett, Mike Rutherford
13.	"Jazz on a Summer's Night"	S. Hackett

== Personnel ==
- Steve Hackett – electric and acoustic guitars, oud, charango, sitar guitar, harmonica, vocals
- Kobi Farhi – vocals on "West to East"
- Mīrā ‘Awaḍ – vocals on "West to East"
- Nick D'Virgilio – drums on "Martian Sea"
- Malik Mansurov – tar on "Behind the Smoke"
- Gunnlaugur Briem (credited as "Gulli Briem") – drums, cajon, percussion
- Roger King – keyboards, programming (except on "The Gift")
- Benedict Fenner – keyboards, programming on "The Gift"
- Leslie-Miriam Bennett – keyboards on "The Gift"
- Nad Sylvan – vocals on "Inca Terra"
- Jo Hackett – vocals on "West to East"
- Gary O'Toole – drums on "Fifty Miles from the North Pole", "El Niño" and "West to East"
- Rob Townsend – baritone saxophone, soprano saxophone, flute, flageolet, quena, duduk, bass clarinet
- Amanda Lehmann – vocals
- Christine Townsend – violin, viola
- Dick Driver – double bass
- Troy Donockley – uilleann pipes on "In Another Life"
- John Hackett – flute on "Martian Sea" and "West to East"
- Ferenc Kovács – trumpet on "Fifty Miles from the North Pole"
- Sara Kovács – didgeridoo on "Fifty Miles from the North Pole"

== Charts ==
Chart (2017)	Peak position
Austrian Albums (Ö3 Austria)	62
Belgian Albums (Ultratop Flanders)	64
Belgian Albums (Ultratop Wallonia)	35
Dutch Albums (Album Top 100)	43
French Albums (SNEP)	101
German Albums (Offizielle Top 100)	22
Italian Albums (FIMI)	34
Scottish Albums (OCC)	21
Swiss Albums (Schweizer Hitparade)	39
UK Albums (OCC)	28
UK Rock & Metal Albums (OCC)	3
