= North of South (band) =

Spanish heavy metal project

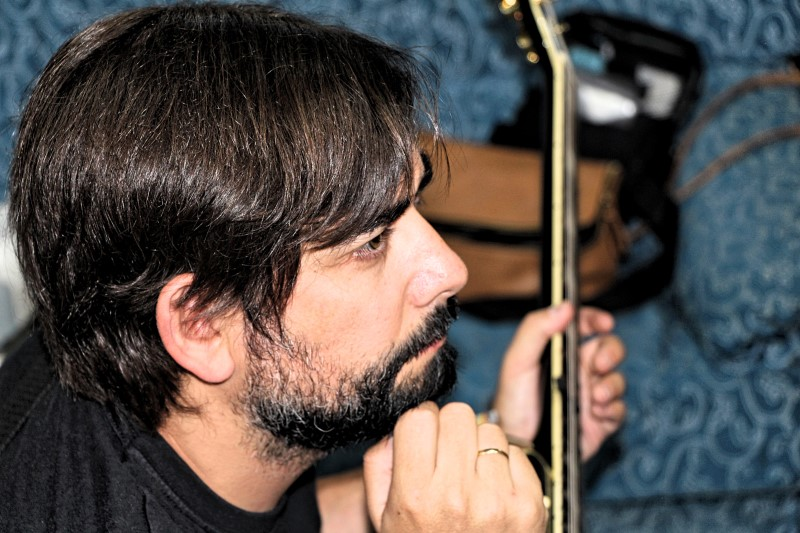
- Chechu Nos, founder of North of South

Background information
- Origin: León, Spain
- Genres: Metal; progressive metal; jazz fusion
- Years active: 2017–present
- Members: Chechu Nos
- Website: northofsouth.es

North of South is a Spanish metal project led by multi-instrumentalist Chechu Nos. Officially founded in 2017, it is focused on the release of studio albums, and has not performed live to date.

North of South blends a variety of genres, including progressive metal, jazz, pop, and Latin music. Most lyrics are sung in English, though Spanish is used as well.

The project often involves the collaboration of other artists, such as Kobi Farhi (Orphaned Land), Anna Murphy (Cellar Darling), Zuberoa Aznárez (Diabulus in Musica), Tom S. Englund (Evergrey), and Sakis Tolis (Rotting Christ).

North of South released the album New Latitudes in 2018 and the EP The Dogma and the Outsider in 2019. Their second studio album, The Tides in Our Veins, was released in 2021.

== Discography ==
Studio albums

- New Latitudes (2018)
- The Tides in Our Veins (2021)

EPs

- The Dogma and the Outsider (2019)

Singles

- "The Human Equation" (2018)
- "Nobody Knows" (2018)
- "Ember Remains" (featuring Kobi Farhi) (2019)
- "We Refused to Hear Them (It's Our Song)" (featuring Anna Murphy) (2019)
- "Soul Cartography" (featuring Tom S. Englund) (2021)
- "Just Fourteen Seconds" (featuring Sakis Tolis and Javier Caminero) (2021)
