= Unsung Prophets & Dead Messiahs =

Unsung Prophets and Dead Messiahs

Studio album by Orphaned Land
- Released: January 26, 2018
- Studios: Fascination Street Studios; Black Knob Studios; Jaffa Sound Arts; Bardo Studio
- Genres: Oriental metal; progressive metal; symphonic metal
- Length: 63:31
- Label: Century Media
- Producer: Orphaned Land with help from Jens Bogren

Orphaned Land chronology
All Is One (2013)	Unsung Prophets and Dead Messiahs (2018)

Unsung Prophets and Dead Messiahs is the sixth studio album by the Israeli oriental metal band, Orphaned Land, and was released on January 26, 2018. Unsung Prophets and Dead Messiahs is Orphaned Land's fourth concept album, following 2010's The Never Ending Way of ORwarriOR, that once again utilizes the concept of light and darkness to convey its message. Described by the band's main vocalist, Kobi Farhi, as "a protest album, a very angry album," Unsung Prophets and Dead Messiahs is based around Plato's Allegory of the cave—that is, humanity is figuratively trapped in a dark cave; all of their truths are shadows they see in the dark cave, and they will kill anyone who tries to take them out of the cave and bring them into the light. Orphaned Land believe that this allegory still holds true today, and acts as a prophecy two-thousand years later, and thus Plato is "an ancient prophet in a way". Kobi has stated that revolutionaries and leaders are always being assassinated, and are thus like "dead messiahs in a way." He stated that the albums is a projection on humanity that instead of blaming religion or politicians on society's problems, that it's the people who prefer to remain trapped in the darkness; however, if humanity can break free from their chains, the world would be a place that we could not understand unless we try to embrace it.

The album was mixed by Jens Bogren, just like their last album, All Is One, and mastered by Tony Lindgren, with much of the recording and production responsibilities done by Yonaton Kossov and Idan Amsalem in Israel. The artwork was created by Metastazis, as they also did for All Is One. In September 2018, Orphaned Land won the Video Of The Year award at the Progressive Music Awards 2018 in London, for their video, Like Orpheus, which was one of the leading singles of the album. The music video is based on a true story about a Muslim girl who used to attend metal shows in Israel. A photo taken of her in a hijab with the lead singer of Behemoth in his corpse paint went viral, after which her parents forbade her from associating with the "metal world." The music video depicts a Haredi Jewish man and a Muslim woman attending a Kreator concert at night, while hiding their association with the metal community from their families.

== Guest artists and quotations from others ==
The album features three guest artists.

Former Genesis guitarist Steve Hackett contacted Kobi Farhi and asked him to sing in a song about peace on his album The Night Siren. According to Farhi, Hackett offered to either play a guitar solo on an Orpahend Land album or to pay Farhi directly for his performance, and Farhi chose the guitar solo. Hackett appears on the song Chains Fall to Gravity, which is about the hero of the album breaking his chains, leaving the cave, and embracing the light of the outside world.

Blind Guardian lead vocalist Hansi Kürsch sang in the song Like Orpheus as the hero of the album. In this song, Kürsch is singing about the seeing the beauty of the outside world for the first time, after leaving Plato's allegorical cave, and compares himself to Orpheus, whose voice even "the stones loved," according to Farhi, who chose Kürsch to sing in this song because he thinks Kürsch is "the Orpheus of our time".

At the Gates lead vocalist, Tomas Lindberg, performed in the song Only the Dead Have Seen the End of War as a "lunatic" in the cave, according to Farhi, as a contrast to Kürsch's singing like Orpheus. In the previous track, Take My Hand, the hero re-enters the cave and asks everyone trapped there to take his hand and exit the cave. In Only the Dead Have Seen the End of War, the people in the cave think that "he lost his mind," and they kill him. Kobi describes this song as "crazy," and thus wanted someone with a "crazy voice to be the voice of lunacy and craziness," and he felt that Lindberg was the right choice for this since he is "one of the most special growlers" in the metal scene.

Unsung Prophets and Dead Messiahs also takes verbal and musical quotes from various figures throughout history.

The song Take My Hand, includes several lines spoken by Aldous Huxley during an interview with Mike Wallace explaining how he believes the ruling class, political power holders and dictators will gain the consent of the ruled and oppressed partly by drugs, as he mentioned in Brave New World, and "new methods of propaganda," the latter of which is a major theme throughout the album.

At the end of the song The Manifest - Epilogue, part of Victor Jara's song Manifiesto plays simultaneously with several lines of the final scene of the documentary George Orwell: A Life in Pictures, spoken by Chris Langham playing George Orwell consisting of several quotes made by George Orwell in reference to his book 1984. Beforehand the album's choir recites the last two lyrical lines to Jara's Manifiesto in this song. The majority The Manifest - Epilogue is also based around Manifiesto's melody.

Kobi Farhi views both Aldous Huxley and George Orwell as "unsung prophets," with their books Brave New World and 1984, respectively.

The track Poets of Prophetic Messianism is sung by the album's choir, in its original Ancient Greek form, a line from Plato's The Republic:

"Ἢ δοκοῦσί τί σοι τυφλῶν διαφέρειν ὁδὸν ὀρθῶς Πορευομένων οἱ ἄνευ νοῦ ἀληθές τι δοξάζοντες"

which translates directly to English as:

"Anyone who holds a true opinion without understanding Is like a blind man on the right road"

At the start of the song The Manifest - Epilogue, Pirkei Avot 2:21 of the Mishnah is quoted:

"לֹא עָלֶיךָ הַמְּלָאכָה לִגְמֹר, וְלֹא אַתָּה בֶן חוֹרִין לִבָּטֵל מִמֶּנָּה"

which can be directly translated to English as:

"It is not your duty to finish the work, but neither are you at liberty to neglect it."

The song Yedidi (ידידי השכחת) is a medieval Sephardic piyyut written by Jewish philosopher Judah Halevi in the early 12th century. It is customary to recite it in some Israeli communities on the 7th day of Passover.

== Track listing ==
All songs written and composed by Orphaned Land and Alon Miasnikov except where noted.

Unsung Prophets and Dead Messiahs track listing
No.	Title	Writer(s)	Length
1.	"The Cave"		8:10
2.	"We Do Not Resist"		3:24
3.	"In Propaganda"		3:22
4.	"All Knowing Eye"		4:28
5.	"Yedidi"	Judah Halevi	2:33
6.	"Chains Fall to Gravity"		9:29
7.	"Like Orpheus"		4:34
8.	"Poets of Prophetic Messianism"	taken from The Republic by Plato	2:56
9.	"Left Behind"	Moran Magal (composer)	3:11
10.	"My Brother's Keeper"		4:42
11.	"Take My hand"		6:03
12.	"Only the Dead Have Seen the End of War"		5:43
13.	"The Manifest - Epilogue"		4:45
Total length:			1:03:31

== Personnel ==
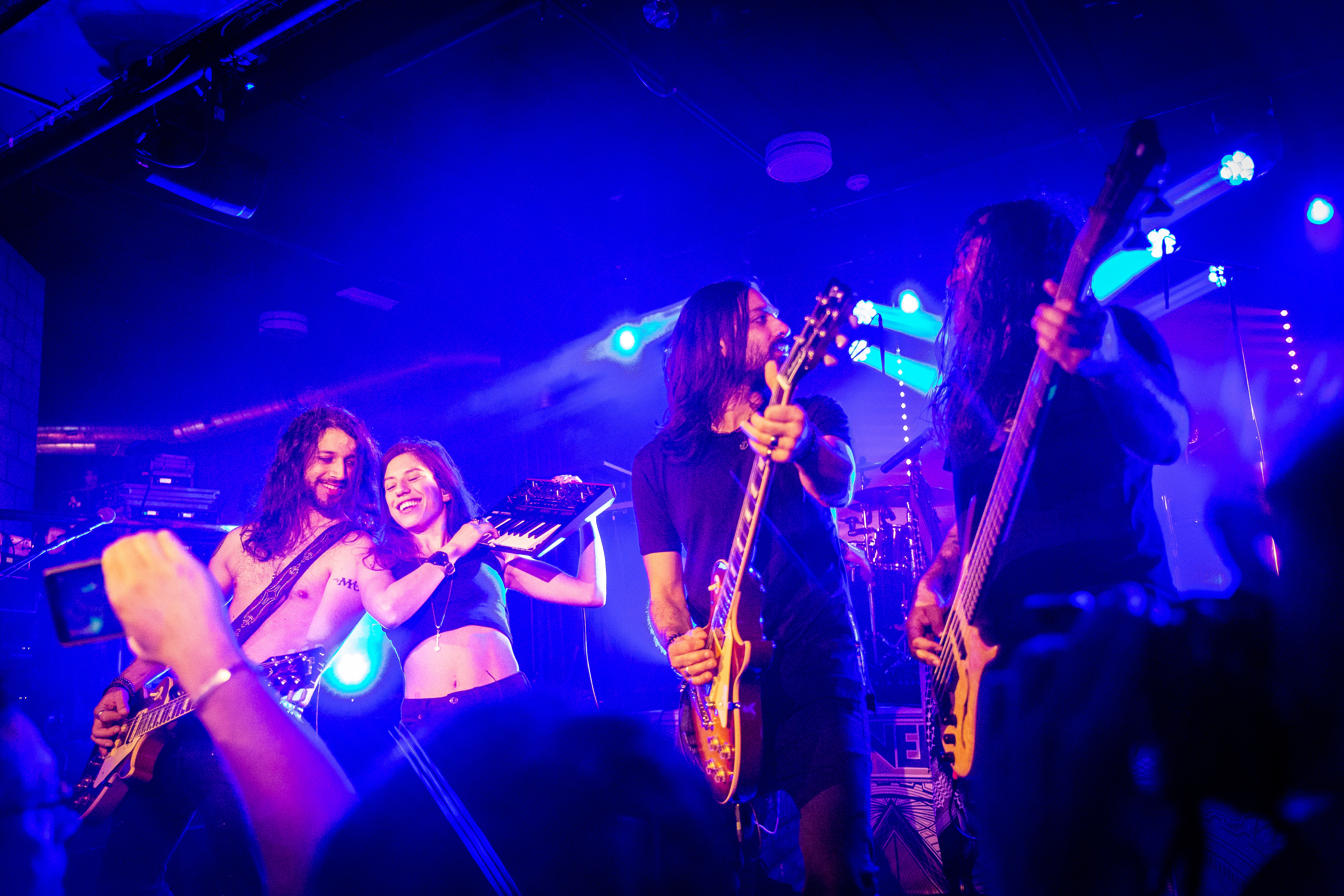
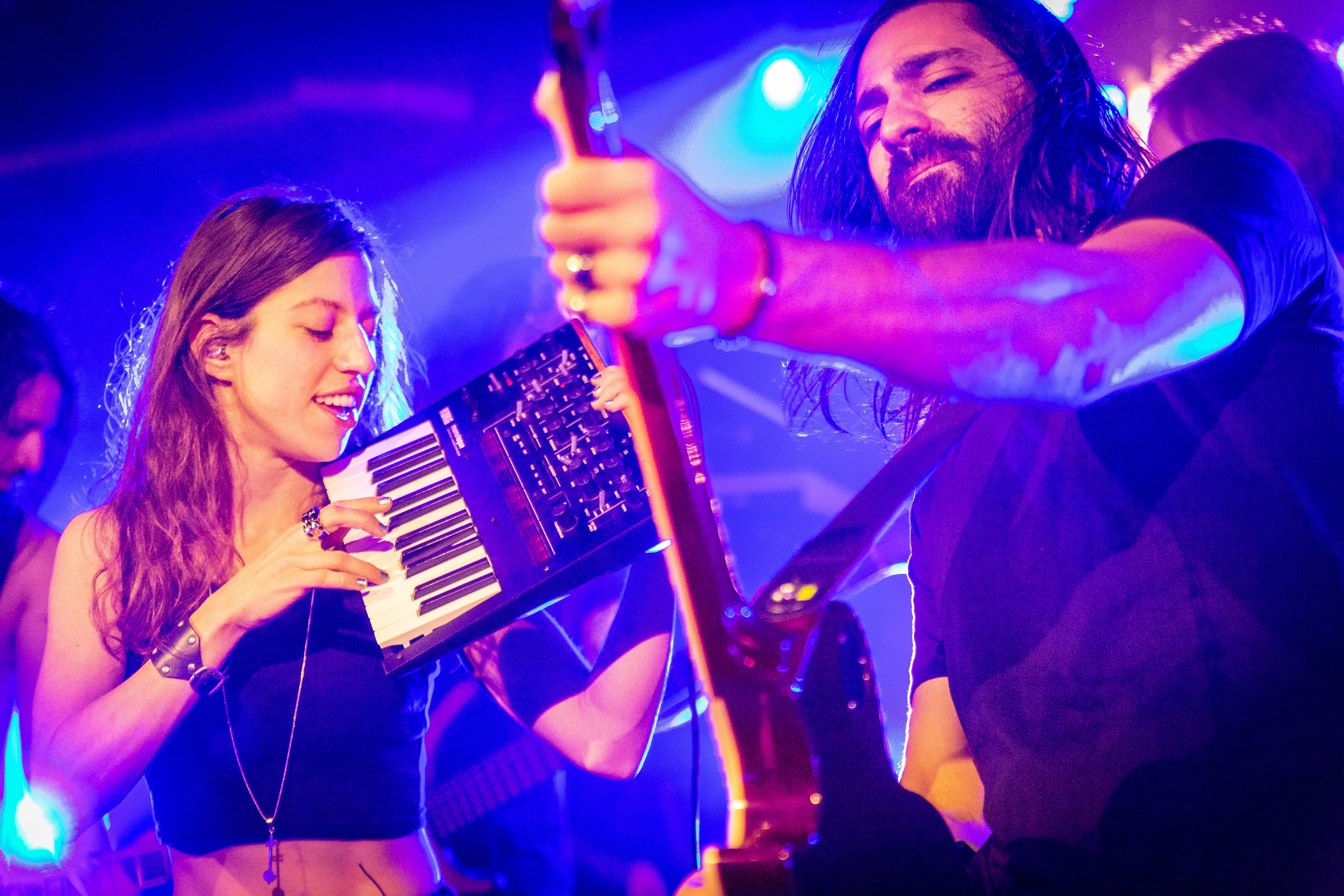
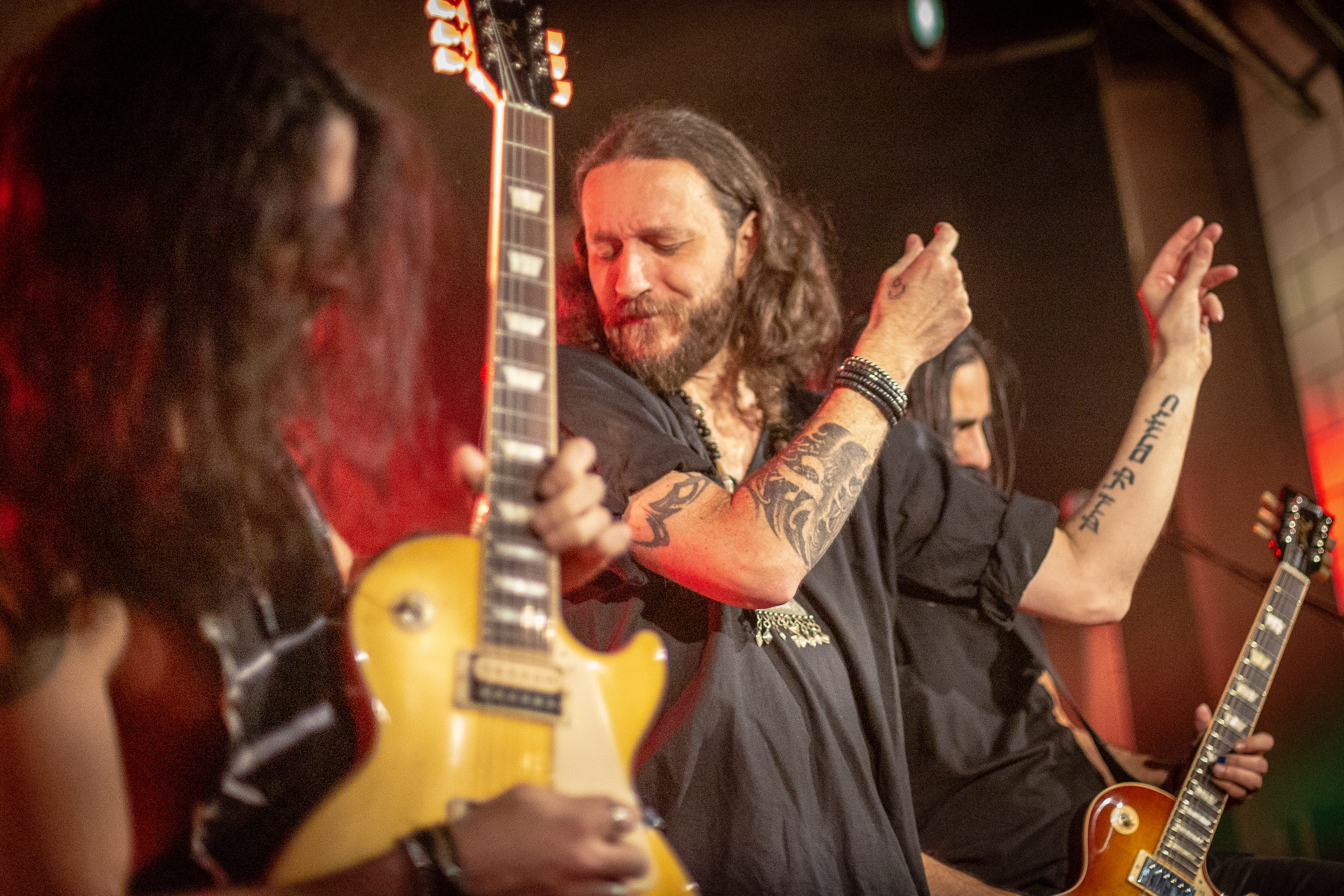
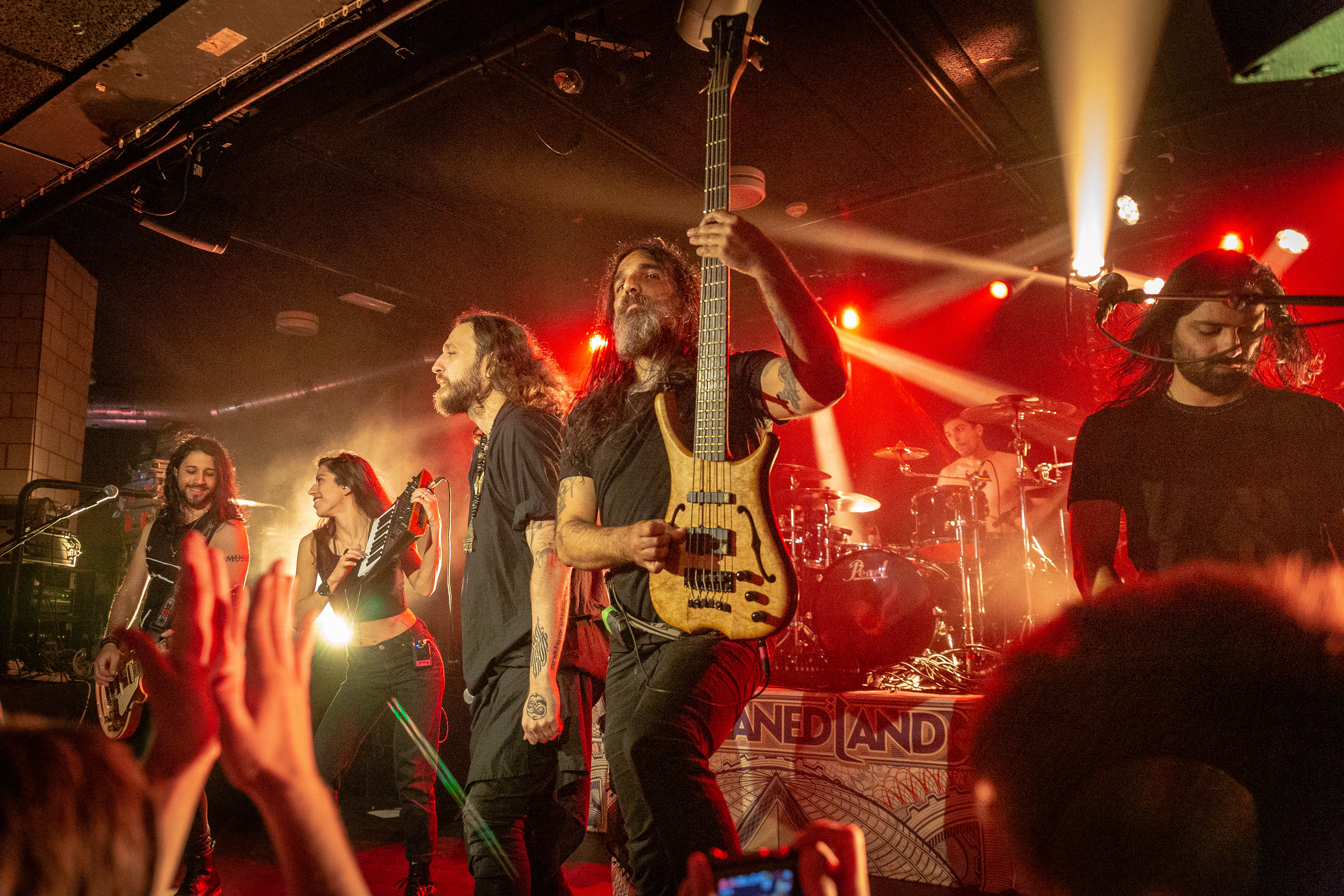
Orphaned Land supporting the release of Unsung Prophets and Dead Messiahs in Switzerland, 2019, with their live keyboardist for the tour, Sharon Mansur.

Orphaned Land

- Kobi Farhi – vocals, death growls, narration
- Uri Zelcha – bass guitar
- Chen Balbus – guitars, saz
- Idan Amsalem – guitars, bouzouki
- Matan Shmuely – drums, percussion

Guest performers

- Hellscore Choir (conducted by Noa Gruman) - choir
- Orphaned Land's oriental orchestra - orchestra
- Noa Gruman - vocals
- Shlomit Levi - vocals
- Steve Hackett - lead guitar on "Chains Fall to Gravity"
- Mumin Sesler - oud, qanun
- Fadel Kandeel - darbuka, bendir
- Roi Smila - electric saz
- Michael Elul - keyboards, piano, organs
- Rome Levtov - child narration, whispers
- Sofia Tympakianaki - reversed Greek narration

Production

- Yonaton Kossov - recording
- Jens Bogren - mixing, additional production
- Tony Lindgren - mastering
