= Khalas =

Palestinian-Israeli rock band

- Origin: Akka, Israel
- Genre: Folk metal
- Years active: 1999–present
- Members: Riyad Sliman; Abed Hathout; Fadel Qandil; Dani Rooster
- Past members: Bassam Beromi; Tarek Sha'aban

Khalas (Arabic: خلص, lit. 'Enough'), also known as Arabic Rock Orchestra, are a Palestinian heavy metal band based in Palestine and formed in 1998.

In 2013, they embarked on a tour across Europe along with Israeli band Orphaned Land, an event which brought coverage to the band in Western media, in outlets such as The Guardian and CNN. Khalas guitarist Abed Hathout and Oprhaned Land vocalist Kobi Farhi met around 10 years before the tour in a radio station.

In the following year, both bands shared the Metal Hammer Global Metal Band of the Year award, after a request by Orphaned Land, which had been chosen by the readers for the award. The groups received the honor in IndigO2 amidst tensions around the kidnapping of three Israeli teenagers.

In response to criticism that the bands' partnership would be a validation of the Israeli-occupation of Palestine or of Palestinian terrorism, both groups stated that their message of understanding "is a sign to everyone that peace is possible". Hathout also responded to criticism that the band doesn't write politically charged songs, focusing instead on less serious topics, by claiming that

"As a Palestinian, I have the right to write songs about beer, about ladies throwing bras at us on stage, and it annoys me because when I answer that, a lot of people say, now you are an Israeli. Well fuck that - if I don't talk about the occupation, I am an Israeli, suddenly".

== Members ==
=== Current members ===
- Riyad Sliman – vocals
- Abed Hathout – guitar
- Dani Rooster – bass
- Fadel Qandil – percussions

=== Former members ===
- Bassam Beromi
- Tarek Sha'aban

== Discography ==
- Ma Adesh Feeha ("We've had it"; 2003)
- Arabic Rock Orchestra (2013)
- The Peace Series Vol. 1 (split EP with Orphaned Land; 2021)
