= Master of Persia =

Iranian metal band

- Years active: 2005-present

Master of Persia (Persian: مستر آف پرشیا) , also known as M.O.P, is an Iranian progressive/death Middle Eastern folk metal band founded in Mashhad in 2005 by Meraj Ansari.

Their music fuses heavy metal with traditional Persian instruments like setar, with lyrical themes centered on ancient Persian history and culture.

== History ==
The band was established by Asari in 2005; lead vocalist Anahid joined in 2008. Their first single, "Prince of Persia", was released in 2010, garnering international radio airplay. In 2011, they released their debut album Older Than History (also titled Iran, Older Than History)

After gaining recognition, the band faced severe backlash in Mashhad. Meraj was charged with Satanism, flogged 130 times, and imprisoned; Anahid was in danger because her involvement in the underground metal scene drew the ire of local authorities - and was against the ban on female vocalists. She was threatened and kicked out of her parents house The threats forced them into exile, relocating to Yerevan, Armenia.

They founded and organized the Persian Rock & Metal Festival starting in 2012, hosting it in Yerevan, Tbilisi, and Turkey, bringing together bands from Iran and across the Middle East.

In 2015, they performed at the “Peace, Love & Rock in the Middle East” festival in Çanakkale alongside Israeli metal band Orphaned Land.

In 2015, they released the single "Get Up And Fight", followed by another single in 2016, "Acid Attack", featuring the American band GATH.

== Members ==
- Meraj - Vocals (2005-present)
- Anahid - Vocals (2008-present)
- Rezman - Guitars (2007-2011)
- Ater (Amirhosein AvazNiya) - Drums
- Iron - Bass (2007-2011)

== Discography ==
Singles:

- Prince of Persia (2010)
- Get Up And Fight (2015)
- Acid Attack (feat. GATH) (2016)

Album:

- Older Than History (Iran, Older Than History) (2011)
