= Black-and-white dualism =

Metaphorical contrast of white and black

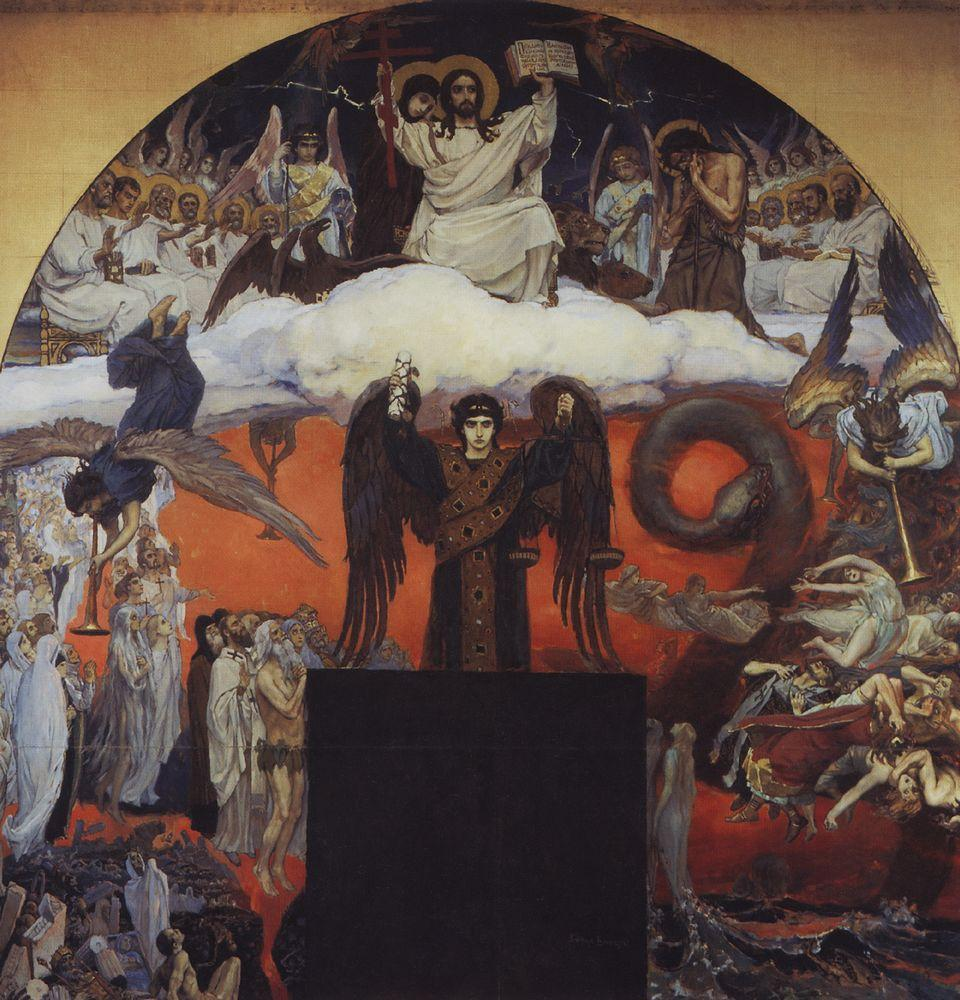
The Last Judgement by Viktor Vasnetsov.

The contrast of white and black (light and darkness, day and night) has a long tradition of metaphorical usage, traceable to the Ancient Near East, and explicitly in the Pythagorean Table of Opposites. In Western culture as well as in Confucianism, the contrast symbolizes the moral dichotomy of good and evil.

== Description ==
Day, light, and good are often linked together, in opposition to night, darkness, and evil. These contrasting metaphors may go back as far as human history, and appear in many cultures, including both the ancient Chinese and the ancient Persians. The philosophy of neoplatonism is strongly imbued with the metaphor of goodness as light.

== Examples ==
=== Religion and mythology ===
- The Genesis creation narrative has God "separate light from darkness" on the First Day.
- The Bible associates light with God, truth, and virtue; darkness is associated with sin and the Devil. Painters such as Rembrandt portrayed divine light illuminating an otherwise dark world.
- War of the Sons of Light Against the Sons of Darkness, part of the Dead Sea Scrolls.
- The underworld (Hades, Tartarus) was imagined as a chthonic place of darkness, contrasting with the celestial realm of the gods. Christian notions of heaven and hell inherit this conception, as do the "dark angels" vs. the unfallen angels, often with aureola (halos), in Christian mythology.
- Day and night are personified as deities in various mythologies (e.g. Norse Dagr and Nótt, Greek Hemera and Nyx, et cetera).
- Yin-yang
- Illiyin is the highest place and the resting place for the good souls among the highest angels, opposed to Sijjin, the farest underworld and resting place for the evil souls among the fallen angel; Islamic literature.

=== Dress ===
- White often represents purity or innocence in Western culture, particularly as white clothing or objects, can be stained easily. In most Western countries white is the color worn by brides at weddings. Angels are typically depicted as clothed in white robes.
  - In many Hollywood Westerns, bad cowboys wear black hats while the good ones wear white.
  - Melodrama villains are dressed in black and heroines in white dresses.
  - This can be reversed as a deliberate play on conventions, by having the evil character dress in white, as a symbol of their hypocrisy or arrogance. For example, Don Fanucci in The Godfather, Part II is an evil character, but wears an expensive all-white suit as a sign of his esteem, power and prestige. Sometimes protagonists can wear black too, as in Return of the Jedi, wherein Luke Skywalker wears black during the final battle. This may symbolize the danger of Luke turning to the dark side, but once he has prevailed (in the scene where he removes Darth Vader's helmet), his jacket has opened up to reveal that it has a lighter color in the inside, as if to indicate that Luke "on the inside" was always good. Darth Vader himself, while still in the grip of the dark side, dresses all in black and may be regarded as a science-fiction version of a black knight. The chief antagonist of the Star Wars franchise, the evil Emperor Palpatine, wears a black cloak.
  - In computer security, a black hat is an attacker with evil intentions, while a white hat bears no such ill will (this is derived from the Western movie convention).

=== Magic ===
- Healing or "good" paranormal magic is called White magic. Black magic is a destructive or evil form of magic.
  - A Treatise on White Magic is a book by Alice Bailey, a Theosophist.
  - White witch.
  - Evil witches are stereotypically dressed in black and good fairies in white.

=== In popular culture ===
- The topos of "light and darkness" is also reflected in numerous titles in popular culture, such as Heart of Darkness (1899), Light in My Darkness (1927), Darkness and the Light (1942), Creatures of Light and Darkness (1969), Darkness to Light (1973), Darkness and Light (1989), The Lord of the Light and of the Darkness (1993), the Star Trek: Deep Space Nine episode "The Darkness and the Light" (1997), the Babylon 5 episode "Between the Darkness and the Light" (1997), and Out of the Darkness, Into the Light (1998).
- In works of fantasy fiction, the main antagonist is often called a "Dark Lord", for example Sauron in The Lord of the Rings.
- The space-opera franchise Star Wars also depicts Light and Dark aspects in the form of the fictional energy field called The Force where there are two sides, light side and dark side wherein the protagonists, the Jedi, practice and propagate the use of the former, and the antagonists, the Sith, use the latter.
- George Orwell makes a bitterly ironic use of the "light and darkness" topos in his Nineteen Eighty Four. In the early part of the book the protagonist gets a promise that "We will meet in the place where there is no darkness" – which he interprets as referring to a place where the oppressive totalitarian state does not rule. But the man who made the promise was in fact an agent of the Thought Police – and they eventually meet as prisoner and interrogator where there is indeed no darkness, in detention cells where the light remains on permanently, day and night, as an additional means of torturing detainees.
- The Dark Crystal explains the two split halves of a balanced whole, reflecting the impossibility of acknowledging any metaphorical divine balance without the combination of both the light (the Mystics) and the dark (the Skesis).
- All four of Orphaned Land's concept albums deal with the theme of "light versus darkness," in some way, that the band refers to as "The tango between God and Satan". El Norra Alila can be translated as "God of Light, Evil of the Night," Mabool is about the Genesis flood narrative, which is part of the Genesis Creation narrative, The Never Ending Way of ORWarriOR is about the battle between darkness, a place of questions, and light, a place of answers, and Unsung Prophets & Dead Messiahs utilizes Plato's Allegory of the cave, describing how humanity is trapped in the darkness and refuses to embrace the light.

=== Other examples ===
- The Dark Ages vs. the Age of Enlightenment.
- The age of Islam versus the "Age of Ignorance" or the Jahiliyyah (in Islamic theology)
- "Black and white thinking" is the false dichotomy of assuming anything not good is evil and vice versa.
- Black–white binary has often been conflated with the binary of good and evil.
- Freemasonry has a black-and-white checkerboard as a central symbol within the lodge and all rituals occur on or around this checkerboard. Also known as a Mosaic Pavement, it represents the floor of King Solomon's Temple and according to Shakespeare, represents man's natural duality.
- In software policy, lists of items either allowed or disallowed are sometimes referred to as 'whitelists' and 'blacklists' respectively. This practice is sometimes criticised for invoking supposed racial connotations, despite the origins of black and white dualism being entirely separate from race, and 'allowlists' and 'blocklists/denylists' are used instead.

== See also ==
- Black and white thinking
- Dialectics of Nature
- Fantasy tropes and conventions
- Table of Opposites
