= All Is One =

Studio album by Orphaned Land
- Released: June 24, 2013
- Recorded: 2012–2013
- Genre: Oriental metal; progressive metal; symphonic metal
- Length: 54:09
- Label: Century Media
- Producer: Jens Bogren and Orphaned Land

Orphaned Land chronology
The Never Ending Way of ORWarriOR (2010)	All Is One (2013)	Unsung Prophets & Dead Messiahs (2018)

Professional ratings
Review scores
Source	Rating
Metal.de	9/10

All Is One is the fifth album by the Israeli oriental metal band, Orphaned Land, which was released on June 24, 2013. It is the first album to feature guitarist Chen Balbus who replaced the co-founding member and guitarist Matti Svatitzky in 2012. It is also the last album to feature the co founding member and guitarist (along with oriental instruments) Yossi Sassi who left the band in 2014.

== Songs ==
The song "Brother" is a ballad that discusses the relationship between Isaac and Ishmael. The song is written from the point of view of one brother (Isaac) who writes a letter that forgives the other brother (Ishmael) for becoming enemies.

The lyrics of the song "Let the Truce Be Known" was inspired from the story of the Christmas truce in World War I which in it the soldiers celebrated together Christmas and the day after, they returned to kill each other. The song was composed along with the Israeli artist, Kobi Aflalo.

The song "Shamaim" (In English: "Sky"; in Hebrew: שמיים) was written by the Israeli artist Yehuda Poliker, and it combines elements and concepts that were in the band's previous albums. the song is a closing cycle for the band, mostly because the band's name is taken from Poliker's song "Winds of War" (רוחות מלחמה).

The song "Our Own Messiah" contains a verse from the Jewish prayer, Avinu Malkeinu.

== Track listing ==
All tracks are written by Orphaned Land except where noted.

All Is One track listing
No.	Title	Length
1.	"All Is One"	4:30
2.	"The Simple Man"	4:53
3.	"Brother"	4:55
4.	"Let the Truce Be Known" (Kobi Aflalo)	5:31
5.	"Through Fire and Water"	4:08
6.	"Fail" (Orphaned Land and Sami Bachar)	6:03
7.	"Freedom" (Instrumental) (Orphaned Land and Sami Bachar)	3:17
8.	"שמיים (Shama'im)" (Yehuda Poliker)	3:56
9.	"Ya Benaye" (Aharon Amram)	4:37
10.	"Our Own Messiah"	5:16
11.	"Children"	7:09
Total length:		54:09

== Personnel ==
Orphaned Land

- Kobi Farhi – vocals
- Yossi Sassi – electric guitars, acoustic guitars, classic guitars, bouzouki, chumbush
- Chen Balbus – electric guitar
- Uri Zelcha – bass guitar
- Matan Shmuely – drums

Production

- Mira Awad – female vocals
- Shahar Choir – vocals
- Elram Amram – vocals
- Sahar Amram – vocals
- Moran Magal – piano
- Roei Friedman – percussions
- Sami Bachar – guitar
- Tzahi Ventura – flute
- Turkish ensemble – violins

== Charts ==
Chart performance for All Is One
Chart (2013)	Peak position
Belgian Albums (Ultratop Wallonia)	189
