= El Norra Alila =

Studio album by Orphaned Land
- Released: July 18, 1996
- Recorded: 1996, Sigma Studios, Israel
- Genres: Melodic death metal Progressive death metal Oriental metal
- Length: 68:43
- Label: Holy
- Producers: Kobi Farhi; Yossi Sasi

Orphaned Land chronology
| Sahara (1994) | El Norra Alila (1996) | Mabool (2004) |

El Norra Alila re-release cover
- Deluxe Edition cover (2006)

El Norra Alila is the second full-length studio album by the Israeli metal band Orphaned Land, released on July 18, 1996 by Holy Records. It is the band's first concept album. The album was reissued as a deluxe edition in July 2006 as a 10-year-anniversary for the album and contains extras; the song "Disciples of the Sacred Oath" and video clips of "Ornaments of Gold" and "The Evil Urge".

== Album meaning and concept ==
There are religious translations within the album name, "Nor" means "the light" in Arabic, "Alila" meaning "the night", "El" meaning "God" in Hebrew and "Norra" meaning "terrible", and "Alila" meaning "tale". This means that the album can be translated as; "God of Light – Evil of the Night" and gives reference to its concept of light versus darkness.

The name is a pun on El Nora Alila, a popular Sephardic piyyut, which is sung during Ne'ilah of Yom Kippur.

== Track listing ==
1. "Find Yourself, Discover God" – 6:15
2. "Like Fire to Water" – 4:46
3. "The Truth Within" – 4:34
4. "The Path Ahead" – 4:16
5. "A Neverending Way" – 2:06
6. "Takasim" – 1:13
7. "Thee by the Father I Pray" – 3:11
8. "Flawless Belief" – 6:46
9. "Joy" – 0:42
10. "Whisper My Name When You Dream" – 4:35
11. "Shir Hama'Alot" – 5:02
12. "El Meod Na'Ala" – 2:22
13. "Of Temptation Born" – 4:42
14. "The Evil Urge" – 6:07
15. "Shir Hashirim " – 1:58

=== Deluxe Edition ===
1. "Disciples of the Sacred Oath"
2. "Ornaments of Gold" (video clip)
3. "The Evil Urge" (video clip)

== Credits ==
=== Band members ===
- Kobi Farhi – vocals
- Yossi Sasi – lead guitars
- Matti Svatitzki – rhythm guitar
- Uri Zelcha – bass
- Sami Bachar – drums

=== Session members and guests ===
- Hadas Sasi – female vocals
- Amira Salah – Arab female vocals
- Abraham Salman – kannun
- Avi Agababa – zil, bendir, tar, dumbek, darbuka, tambourine
- Sivan Zelikoff – violin
- Yariv Malka – sampler, shofar
- Felix Mizrahi – violin
- Avi Sharon – oud, backing vocals
- David Sasi – vocals, backing vocals
- Unknown musician goes by the name "Vovin" – Guitars

=== Production and other ===
- Lyrics by Orphaned Land, Alon Miasnikov, Traditional
- Music by Orphaned Land, Traditional
- Production by Kobi Farhi, Yossi Sassi
- Engineered by Udi Koomran
- Assistant and Producers: Ran Carmeli, Yuval Segal, Yaniv Barzilai, Gerry Gani
- Mastering by Ran Bagno, Udi Koomran
- Arrangement by Udi Koomran, Kobi Farhi, Yossi Sassi
- "Shir Hashirim" recorded in The Infinite Studios by Yariv Malka.
- Cover art by: Ehud Graf
