= Kobi Farhi =

Israeli singer (born 1975)

Kobi Farhi קובי פרחי
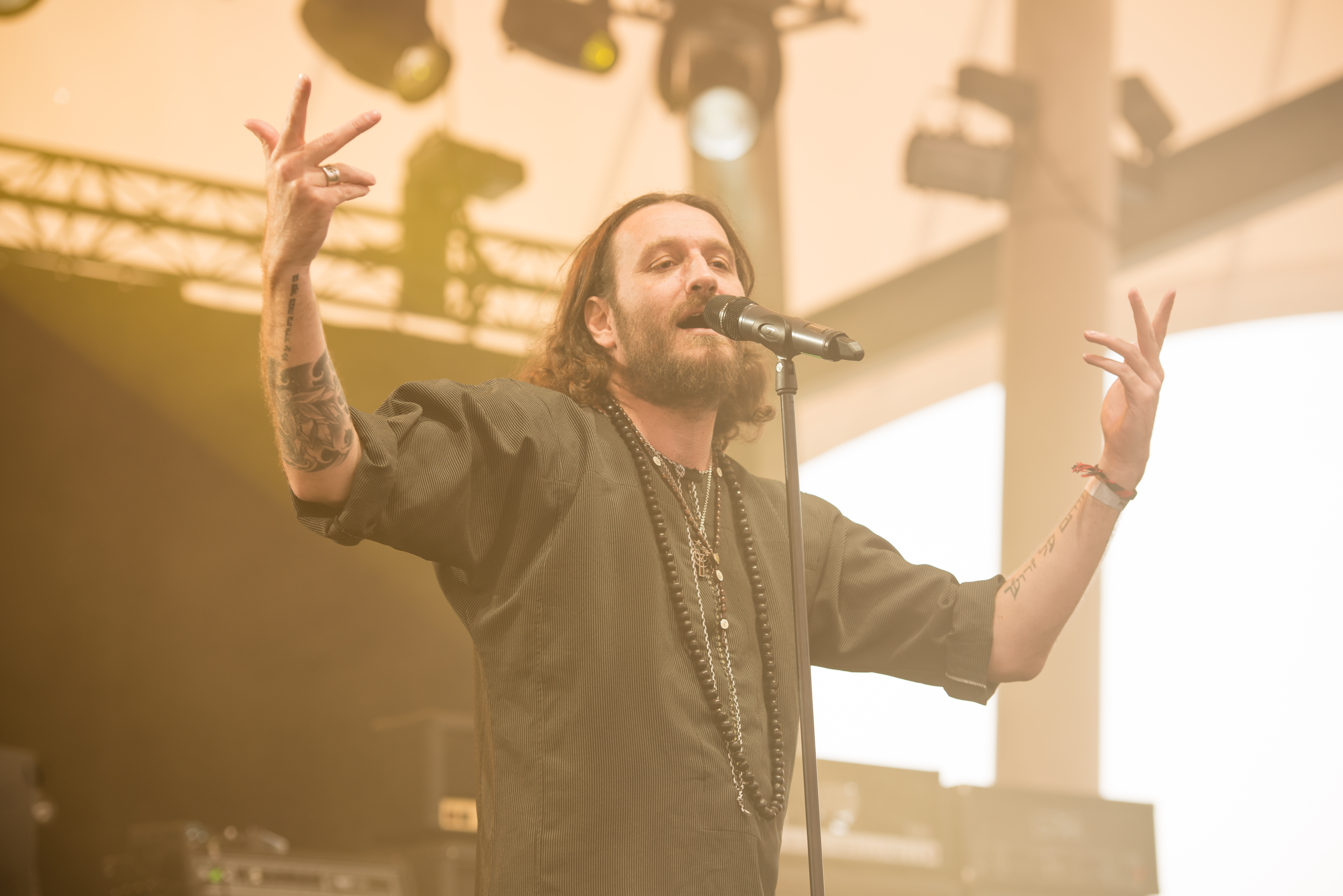
- Farhi performing with Orphaned Land in 2014

Background information
- Born: 8 September 1975 (age 50); Jaffa, Israel
- Genres: Metal; Oriental metal; folk metal; progressive rock
- Occupation: Musician
- Instrument: Vocals
- Years active: 1991–present
- Label: Century Media
- Website: Orphaned Land official website

Kobi Farhi (Hebrew: קובי פרחי; born 8 September 1975) is an Israeli musician, the lead singer and founder of Oriental metal band Orphaned Land.

== Life and career ==
Farhi was born in Jaffa, Israel. At a young age, Farhi, who already loved heavy metal music, discovered oriental and world music through his family.

He formed the band Orphaned Land in 1991 with his high school friends. The musician has stated that his main mission is "to bring people and hearts together, from all countries and sectors of the bleeding Middle East".

Apart from Orphaned Land, Farhi founded the record label MDMA, with a focus on heavy metal and electronic music. In 2001, he left the label, as Orphaned Land was gaining in popularity and playing their first show overseas, in Turkey.

Farhi has received three honorary awards for peace: From Istanbul Commerce University, from the Mayor of Çankaya in Ankara, and from the Turkish government's official advisor, after a show Orphaned Land played in the country, donating all earnings to the people affected by the 2011 Van earthquake. In 2014, Farhi won the Global Metal Award for Orphaned Land, granted by Metal Hammer Magazine at the Golden Gods awards. In September 2018, Orphaned Land won the Video of the Year award at the Progressive Music Awards in London, for their video to the song "Like Orpheus".

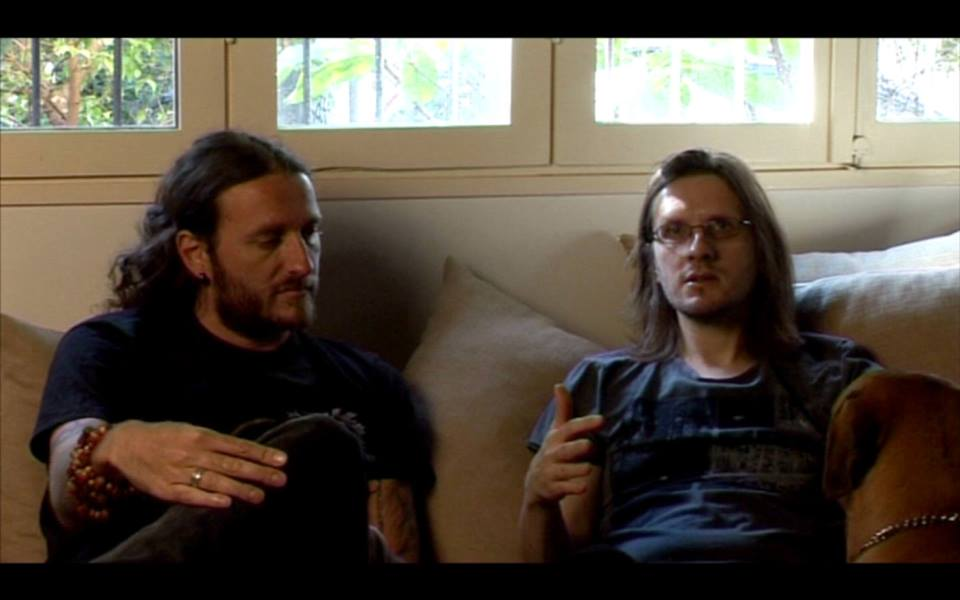
Kobi Farhi and Steven Wilson in 2011

Besides his involvement with Orphaned Land, Farhi has worked as a musical editor at Century Media Records, the label to which the band is signed, editing a compilation titled Oriental Metal. He has also contributed guest vocals to a number of albums by other artists, such as North of South (Spain), Arkan (France), Amaseffer (Israel), Magor (Israel), Subterranean Masquerade (Israel), Melted Space (France), Enzo Donnarumma (Italy), and Moran Magal (Israel). He has also collaborated with Steven Wilson, Erkin Koray, and Yehuda Poliker. Farhi participated in the 2013 Rise Up (Colors of Peace) musical project. He also recorded a cover of "Jeremy" by Pearl Jam with fellow musicians, as part of a campaign to get the band to perform in Israel.

In 2017, former Genesis guitarist Steve Hackett contacted Farhi about a peace-themed collaboration. Together with Israeli Arab singer Mira Awad, Farhi sang on "West to East", a track from Hackett's 2017 album The Night Siren. Hackett then recorded a guitar solo on the track "Chains Fall to Gravity" from Orphaned Land's 2018 album, Unsung Prophets and Dead Messiahs.
