= Sahara (Orphaned Land album) =

Studio album by Orphaned Land
- Released: 25 November 1994
- Recorded: June 1994, "Sigma" studios, Tel Aviv, Israel
- Genres: Death-doom; Oriental metal; melodic death metal
- Length: 58:29; 77:49 (digipak)
- Label: Holy
- Producer: Orphaned Land

Orphaned Land chronology
The Beloved's Cry (1993)	Sahara (1994)	El Norra Alila (1996)

Sahara re-release
- Re-release (2002)

Sahara is the debut studio album by the Israeli metal band Orphaned Land, released on 25 November 1994 by French label Holy Records. The 2002 digipak re-release of the album features three bonus tracks: "Above You All", "Pits of Despair" and "The Beloved's Cry (Martini remix – Hangis Han)" and edited cover art. The songs "Seasons Unite", "The Beloveds Cry", "My Requiem", "Orphaned Land – The Storm Still Rages Inside..." are all from the demo The Beloved's Cry.

== Track listing ==
1. "The Sahara's Storm" – 7:59
2. "Blessed Be Thy Hate" – 9:25
3. "Ornaments of Gold" – 7:08
4. "Aldiar Al Mukadisa" – 3:15 (Translated: Holy Land)
5. "Seasons Unite" – 8:30
6. "The Beloved's Cry" – 4:33
7. "My Requiem" – 8:27
8. "Orphaned Land – The Storm Still Rages Inside..." – 9:10

Digipak bonus tracks

1. "Above You All" – 4:57
2. "Pits of Despair" – 4:20
3. "The Beloved's Cry (Martini remix – Hangis Han)" – 10:05

== Personnel ==
=== Band members ===
- Kobi Farhi – vocals
- Yossi Sasi – lead guitar, oud
- Matti Svatitzki – rhythm guitar
- Uri Zelcha – bass
- Sami Bachar – drums
- Itzik Levi – keyboards, sampler, piano

=== Guest musicians ===
- Hadas Sasi – female vocals
- Albert Dadon – tarbuka
- Abraham Salman – kanun
- "Neve Israel" synagogue – background vocals
- Amira Salah – female "Arab" vocals
- Unknown musician goes by the name "Vovin" – guitars

=== Production and other ===
- Recorded in "Sigma" Studios, Tel Aviv, Israel, June 1994
- Produced by Orphaned Land
- Engineered by Tamir Muskat
- Assisted by Gary Gani
- Second assistant engineers: Eran Zira, Yotam Agam
- Mixed by Tamir Muskat, Orphaned Land, Gary Gani and Asaf Bar-Lev
- Executive producer Holy Records, Orphaned Land and Asaf Bar-Lev
- Logo by Uri Zelcha and Kobi Farhi
- Photos by Gil Pasternak
- Cover: The Blue Mosque, Istanbul, Turkey
