= Orphaned Land =

Israeli heavy metal band

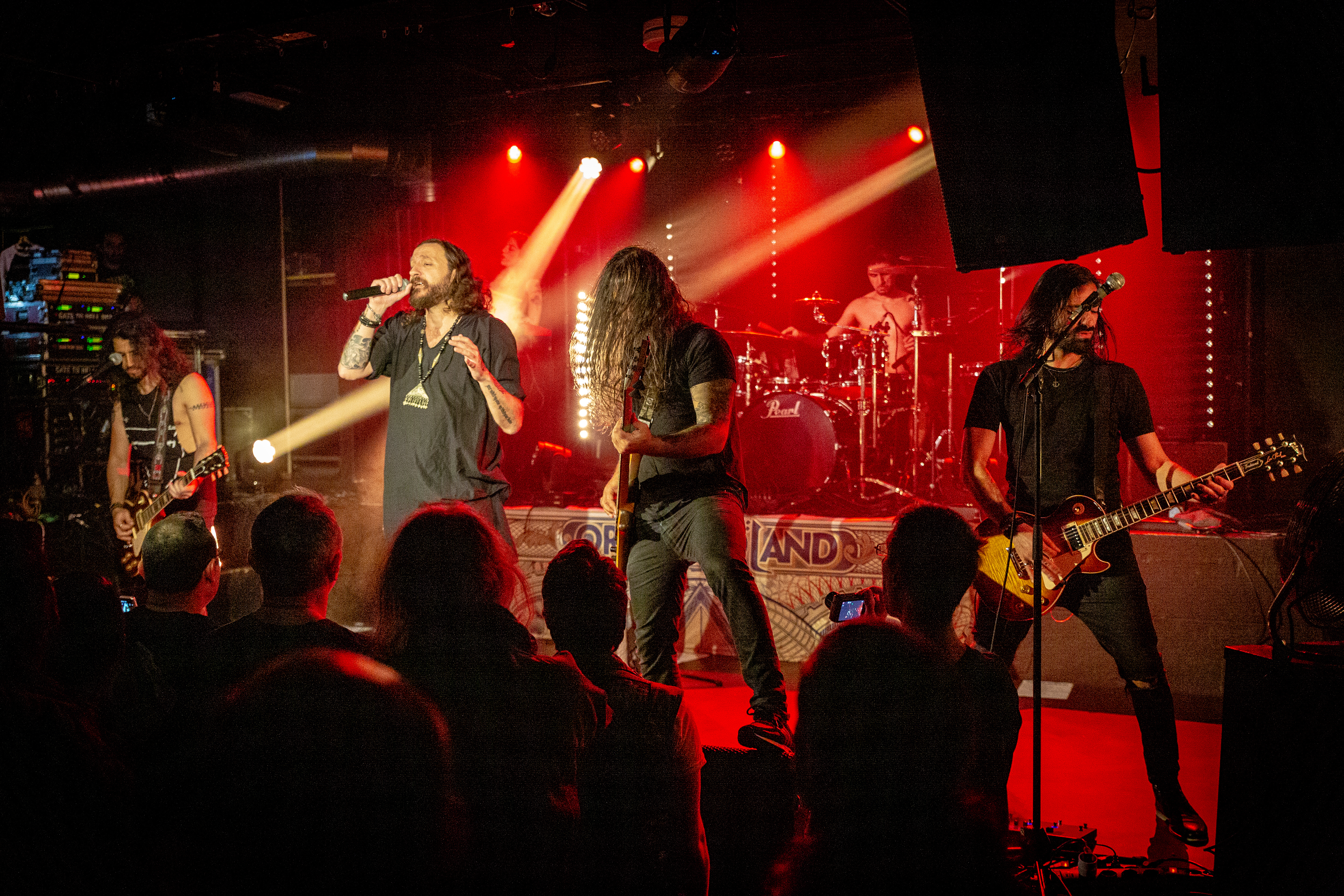
- Orphaned Land live in Switzerland, 2019, in support of their album Unsung Prophets & Dead Messiahs

Background information
- Also known as: Resurrection (1991–1992)
- Origin: Petah Tikva/Bat Yam, Israel
- Genres: Oriental metal; progressive metal; death-doom, death metal (early)
- Years active: 1991–1997, 2001–present
- Labels: Century Media, Holy Records
- Members: Kobi Farhi; Uri Zelcha; Chen Balbus; Matan Shmuely; Idan Amsalem
- Past members: Matti Svatizky; Sami Bachar; Itzik Levy; Eran Asias; Eden Rabin; Avi Diamond; Yossi Sassi
- Website: orphaned-land.com

Orphaned Land is an Israeli heavy metal band formed in 1991. They combine Mizrahi and Maghrebi Jewish, Arabic, Turkish, and other Middle Eastern and North African musical elements, with metal (with particular influence from Yemenite Jewish and, in their early years, Moroccan Jewish music), as well as from Sephardic music, and other sounds from the Mediterranean Region. They have also included "metalized" versions of various piyyutim in all of their albums since El Norra Alila. The band are considered pioneers of oriental metal. Orphaned Land have gone through several lineup changes over the years, but have retained two founding members of the band, Kobi Farhi (vocals) and Uri Zelcha (bass). Other members are Matan Shmuely (drums), Chen Balbus (guitars/saz) who replaced co-founding member Matti Svatizky in 2011, and Idan Amsalem (guitars/bouzouki) who replaced co-founding member Yossi Sassi in early 2014.

== History ==
=== Resurrection (1991–1992) ===
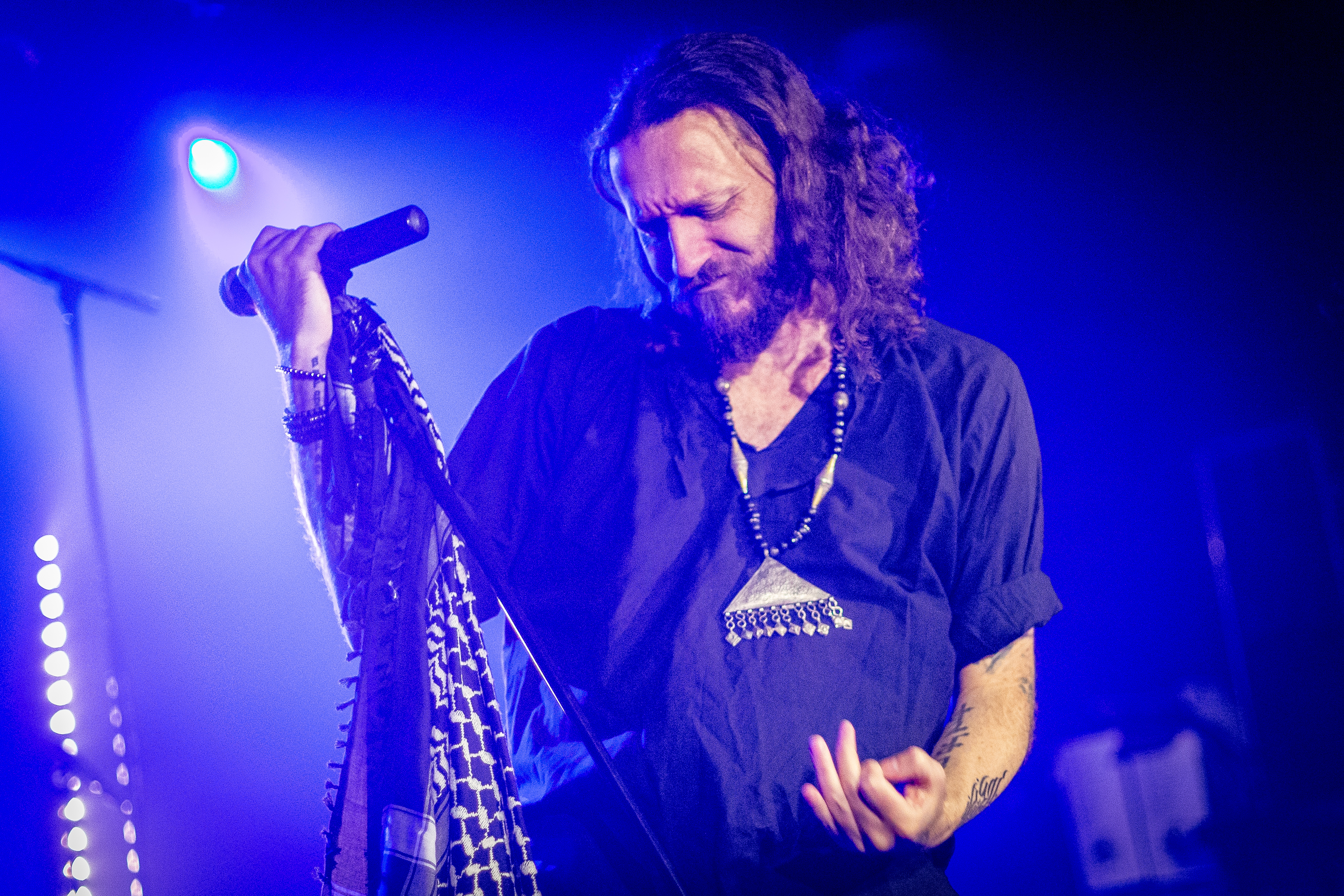
Kobi Farhi – vocalist

At the start of the band's formation, they played "regular" death metal under the name "Resurrection", with the goal to sound like At the Gates, Morbid Angel, Death, Deicide, and other similar sounding bands, and sang about topics like "death from radiation decay." They quickly realized, however, that they are "from a different place, a place with different temperature, culture, and colours, that is also the source of all the monotheistic beliefs", as explained by frontman Kobi Farhi. The band chose to write music that better projected this, incorporating Middle Eastern and North African melodies and folk rhythms into their sound. In 1992, they changed their name to "Orphaned Land", believing that this name better suits their newer, more melodic style, which they dubbed oriental metal. This new style fused melodic death metal and death-doom with elements of progressive metal, incorporating Middle Eastern and North African musical traditions as well as those of Mizrahi, Maghrebi Jewish, and Arabic origins, which has been described as a kind of early folk metal.

=== Sahara, El Norra Alila, and hiatus (1993–2001) ===
In 1993, Orphaned Land released their demo The Beloved's Cry, and in 1994, they released their first album Sahara, in which the band reworked four of the demo's six songs and wrote four new ones.

In 1996, they released their second album El Norra Alila, their first concept album, in which they amplified the "oriental" elements. The name of the album is based on the piyyut of the same name, which is recited during Yom Kippur as a plea of forgiveness, but also acts as a play on words using both Hebrew and Arabic, and can be translated as "God of Light, Evil of the Night," referring to the album's concept. The album also includes traditional Mizrahi piyyutim as songs, as well as sporadic use of Jewish liturgy, with heavier emphasis on Arabic melodies from their previous release. It explored the themes of light and darkness, conveying the message of commonality between the three main Abrahamic religions (Judaism, Christianity, and Islam). This is a theme they would continue to use throughout their next three concept albums, as well.

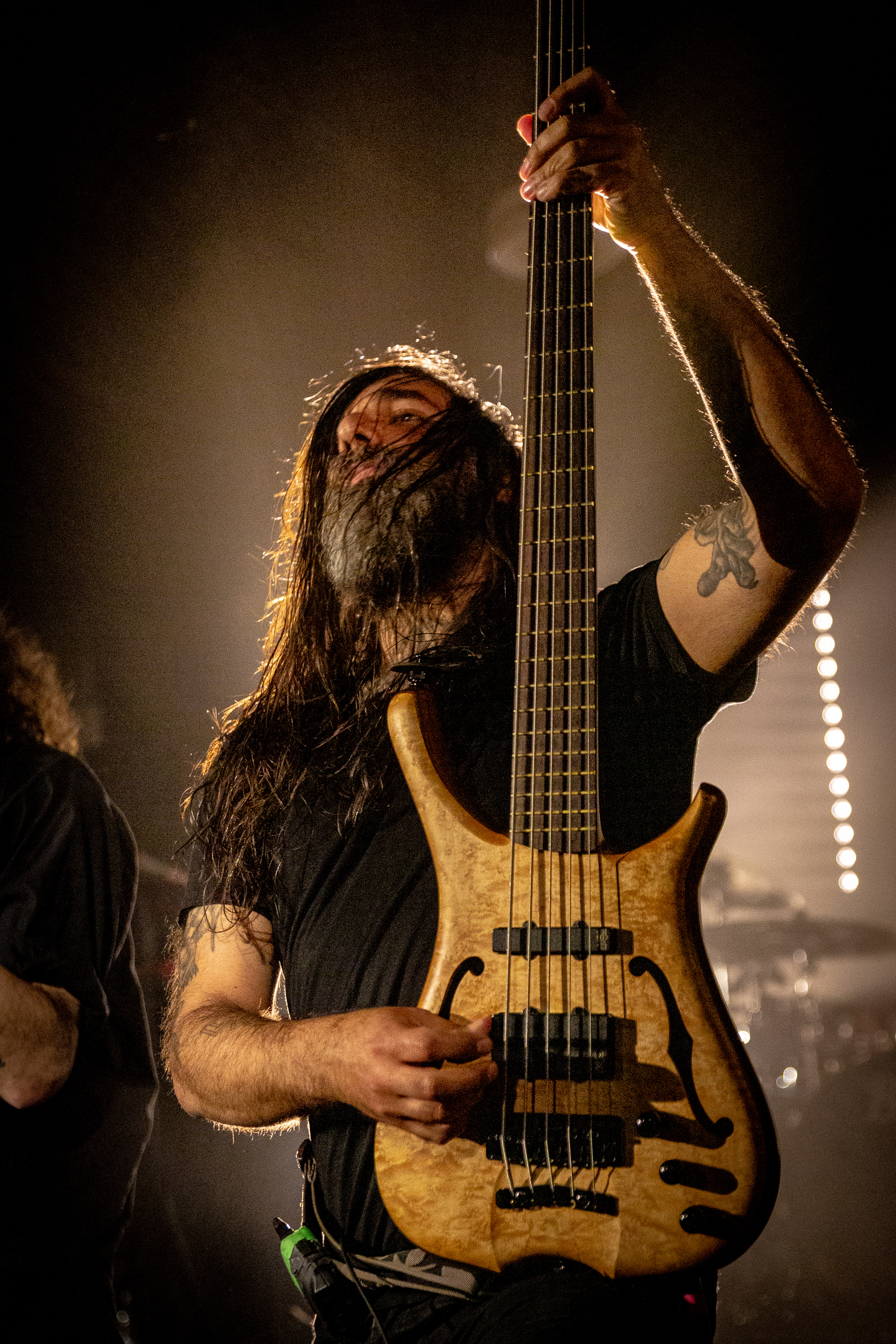
Uri Zelcha – bassist

After the release of El Norra Alila in 1996, Orphaned Land went into "this unknown hiatus", during which "nothing happened". However, in 2001, Farhi received an email from a Jordanian fan who sent him a video of himself revealing a tattoo of the Orphaned Land logo on his arm. Farhi, who was "shocked" by this, given the geopolitical circumstances, considers this the motivating factor to get the band back together, and began recording their next album. They played several shows in Tel Aviv and one in Turkey, their first show abroad. The Jordanian fan who sent Farhi the video came to the show in Turkey, where he brought an Arabic book written by an Egyptian sheikh about Satanism. The book, which detailed how to avoid Satanic groups in Egypt, displayed the lyrics to an Orphaned Land song that contains verses from the Quran. When asked for elaboration by Farhi, the fan explained how the Egyptian National Police raided an Egyptian metalhead's house and discovered a CD with this song on it; the Egyptian fan was sent to prison for six months as this was enough to charge him of blasphemy.

=== Mabool (2002–2009) ===
The band's third album, Mabool: The Story of the Three Sons of Seven was released in 2004, and was the band's second concept album. ""Mabool" (מבול) is the Hebrew word for "flood", and refers to the Genesis flood narrative from which the album's concept, the band's reinterpretation of Noah's Ark, is derived. It tells the story of three sons (one for each Abrahamic religion) who try to warn humanity of a flood coming as punishment for their sins. The album retains the "oriental" instruments from their previous two albums, and also includes two choruses, traditional Yemenite Jewish chants sung by Shlomit Levi, and quotes of biblical verses from chapters 6–9 in Genesis, read by Kobi Farhi.

In 2005, Orphaned Land released the EP Ararat, named after Mount Ararat where Noah's Ark landed, which contains two demos of songs Mabool, and one reworked track from it, as well as a cover of the song Mercy from Paradise Lost. The band describes their first two concept albums as "a meeting of East and West, past and present, light and darkness, and a tango between God and Satan.

In 2008, Orphaned Land was featured in the documentary Global Metal, a film by the creators of Metal: A Headbanger's Journey.

=== The Never Ending Way of ORwarriOR (2010–2012) ===
In January 2010, Orphaned Land released the follow-up to Mabool, and their fourth album, entitled The Never Ending Way of ORWarriOR. In Hebrew, the word "or" (אור) means "light", thus ORwarriOR can be translated as "light warrior" or "warrior of light", and is the band's third concept album. Like El Norra Alila, ORwarriOR explores themes light and darkness; this time the album is about the battle between the darkness, a place of questions, and the light, a place of answers. The album has a different sound than Mabool, was produced and mixed by Steven Wilson of Porcupine Tree, and made free to download for any fan who lives in a "number of" MENA countries. The first single from the CD was titled Sapari and was put on Myspace with two other tracks, Vayehi OR and Disciples of the Sacred Oath II, a sequel to a song from the deluxe edition of El Norra Alila. In early 2011, ORWarriOR was rated the Metal Storm number one progressive metal album of 2010 by users with 421/1130 total votes.

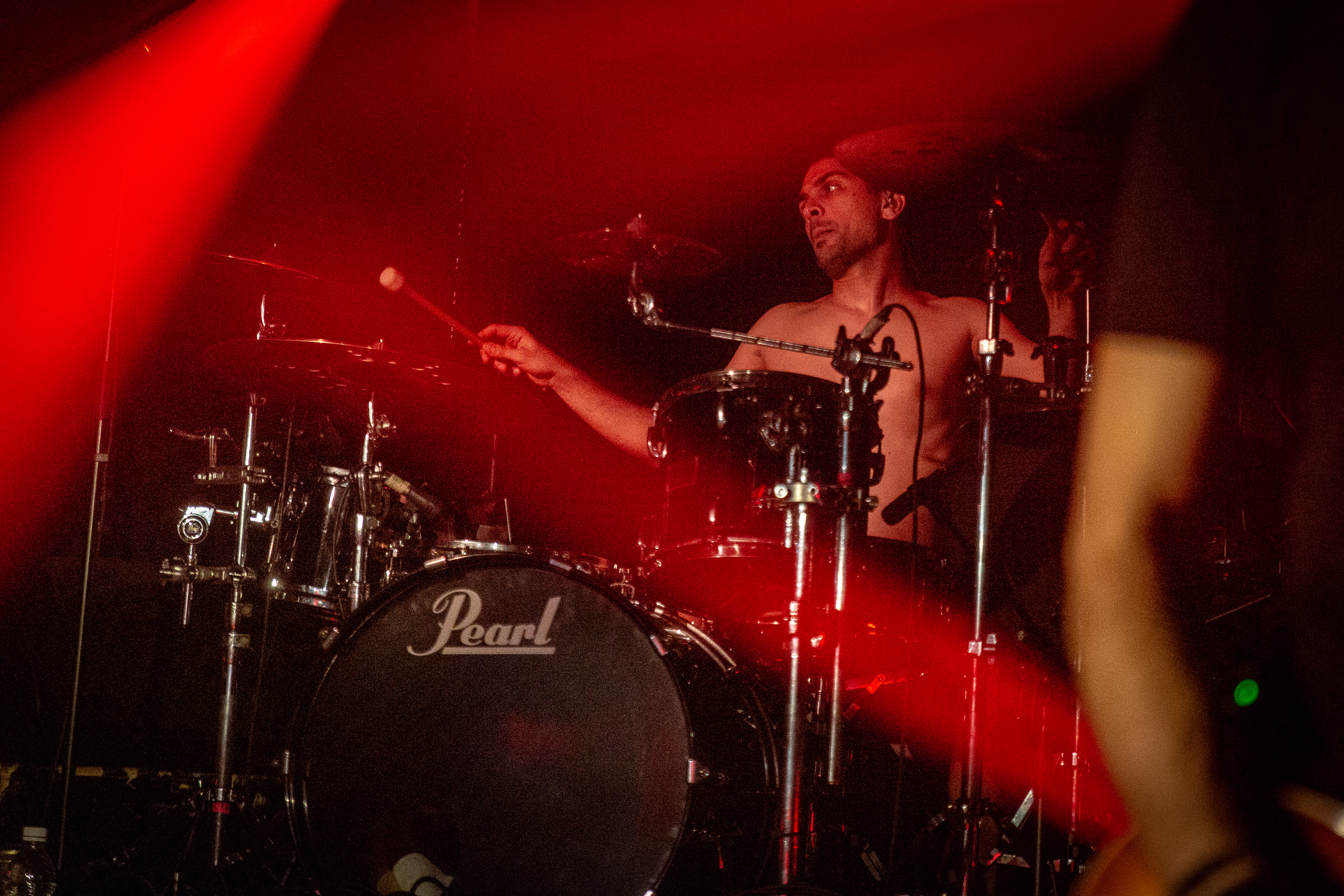
Matan Shmuely – drummer

On 22 May 2010, Orphaned Land performed as the opening act to Metallica's show in Israel. Orphaned Land then went on a festival tour in the summer of 2010, promoting The Never Ending Way of ORWarriOR, with appearances at festivals such as Wacken Open Air, Summer Breeze Open Air, Sonisphere Festival, Gods of Metal, Rock Hard Festival, and more. After the summer festival tour, Orphaned Land, along with Swallow the Sun, went on a North American tour in support of Katatonia. Orphaned Land then followed this with a tour of Europe alongside Ghost Brigade supporting Amorphis. In February 2011, Orphaned Land performed at the Riviera cultural festival at VIT University in Vellore, India. In February 2012, they returned to India and played at the Alcheringa festival at the Indian Institute of Technology, Guwahati.

On 19 June 2011, Orphaned Land performed at the Hellfest metal festival held in Clisson, France. Orphaned Land is known to employ belly dancers at their shows, however for this show, Lebanese belly dancer Johanna Fakhry reached out to Orphaned Land and requested to perform with the band there. While Kobi Farhi agreed to this request, he warned her that it could be dangerous for her. Fakhri decided to join them on stage anyway. At this performance, Farhi and Fakhry held up the Israeli and Lebanese flags side-by-side at the end of the concert as a gesture of peace. After word in Lebanon spread about this performance, Fakhry's parents expressed outrage towards her for this action, she was ridiculed online by Arab communities, and the Shia Islamist organization Hezbollah issued a death warrant to her. Fakhry has not returned to Lebanon since then, and has remained in France. According to Farhi, Orphaned Land has invited her to shows in Israel, but she has rejected the offers out of respect for her parents' wishes.

In 2011, Orphaned Land played two concerts in Israel to celebrate their 20th anniversary. On 24 October, the band released a live music and video album entitled The Road to Or-Shalem, featuring recordings of this concert to celebrate their milestone. On 11 June 2012, guitarist Matty Svatitzky announced his departure from the band, citing personal issues. Matti Svatitzky was replaced by Chen Balbus, a young musician who had performed live with them, previously.

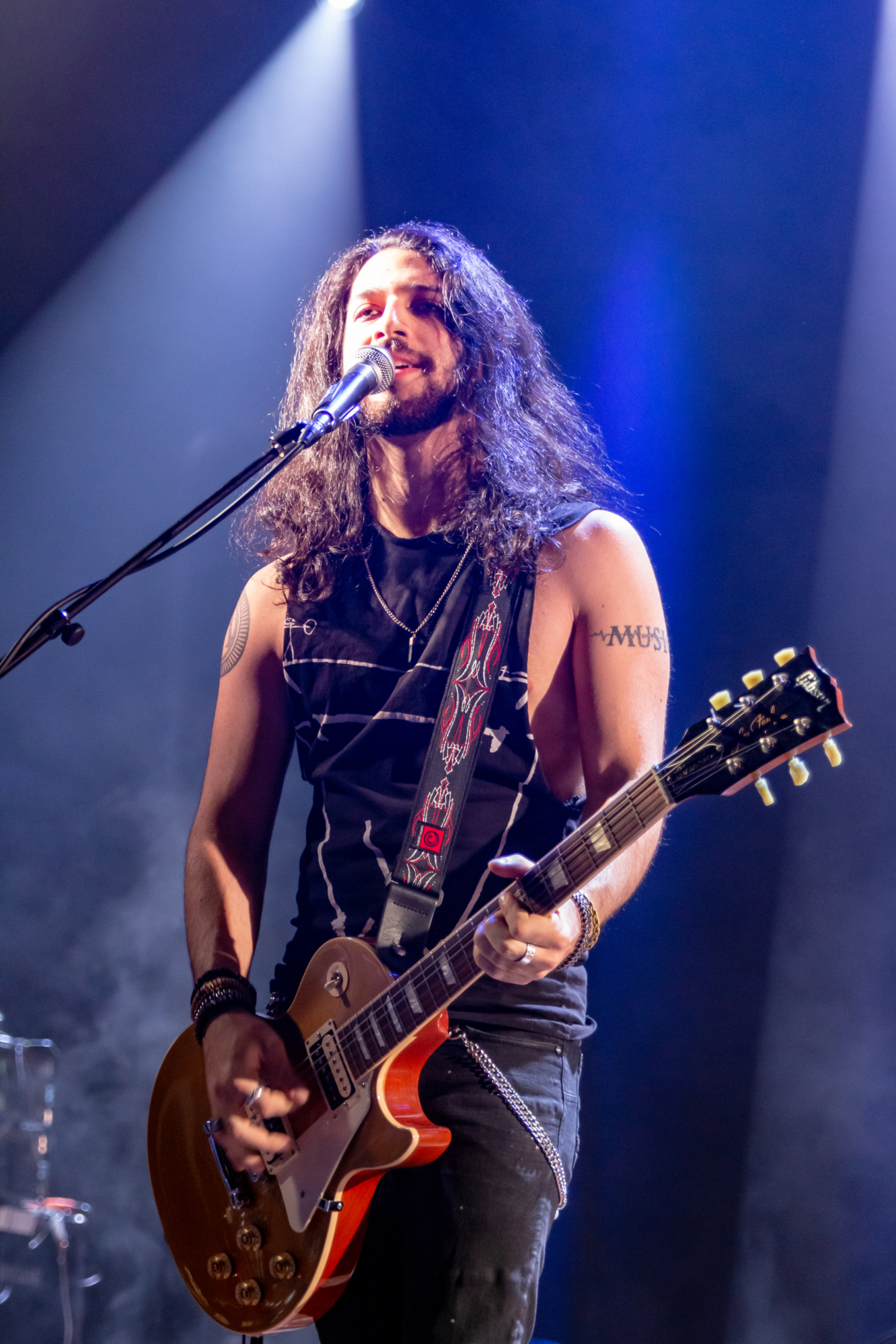
Chen Balbus – guitarist

In 2012 an online petition opened up requesting the Norwegian Nobel Committee consider Orphaned Land to be awarded the 2013 Nobel Peace Prize, which the band's label, Century Media Records, supported.

=== All Is One (2013–2016) ===
Orphaned Land released their fifth album, entitled All is One, on 24 June 2013. This album featured a shift in sound for Orphaned Land, who took a lusher, more symphonic approach to the album than their previous releases, and who experienced a line-up change beforehand. Despite its optimistic title, the band considers it their darkest album thematically; albeit, musically it is their most accessible, least progressive, and lightest album, being nearly devoid of death metal influence. Farhi provided very few death growls on this album, and the highly acclaimed Israeli-Arab singer, Mira Awad, provided female vocals for it.

On 7 January 2014, Orphaned Land announced on their Facebook page that guitarist, multi-instrumentalist, and co-founding band member Yossi Sassi had left the band. He was replaced by guitarist Idan Amsalem.

Orphaned Land won the Metal Hammer award for "Global Metal Band of the Year 2014". The band also released a new music video for the track "Let the Truce Be Known," directed by Vadim Machona.

=== Unsung Prophets & Dead Messiahs (2017–present) ===
In 2017, former Genesis guitarist Steve Hackett contacted Farhi, in his search for artists that work for peace between people, and asked him to perform in a song about peace. The two sides immediately clicked and started collaborating. Together with Mira Awad, Farhi sings in the song West to East on Hackett's album, The Night Siren. According to Farhi, Hackett offered to either play a guitar solo on an Orphaned Land album or to pay Farhi directly for his performance, and Farhi chose the guitar solo. Hackett appears on the song Chains Fall to Gravity from their upcoming album.

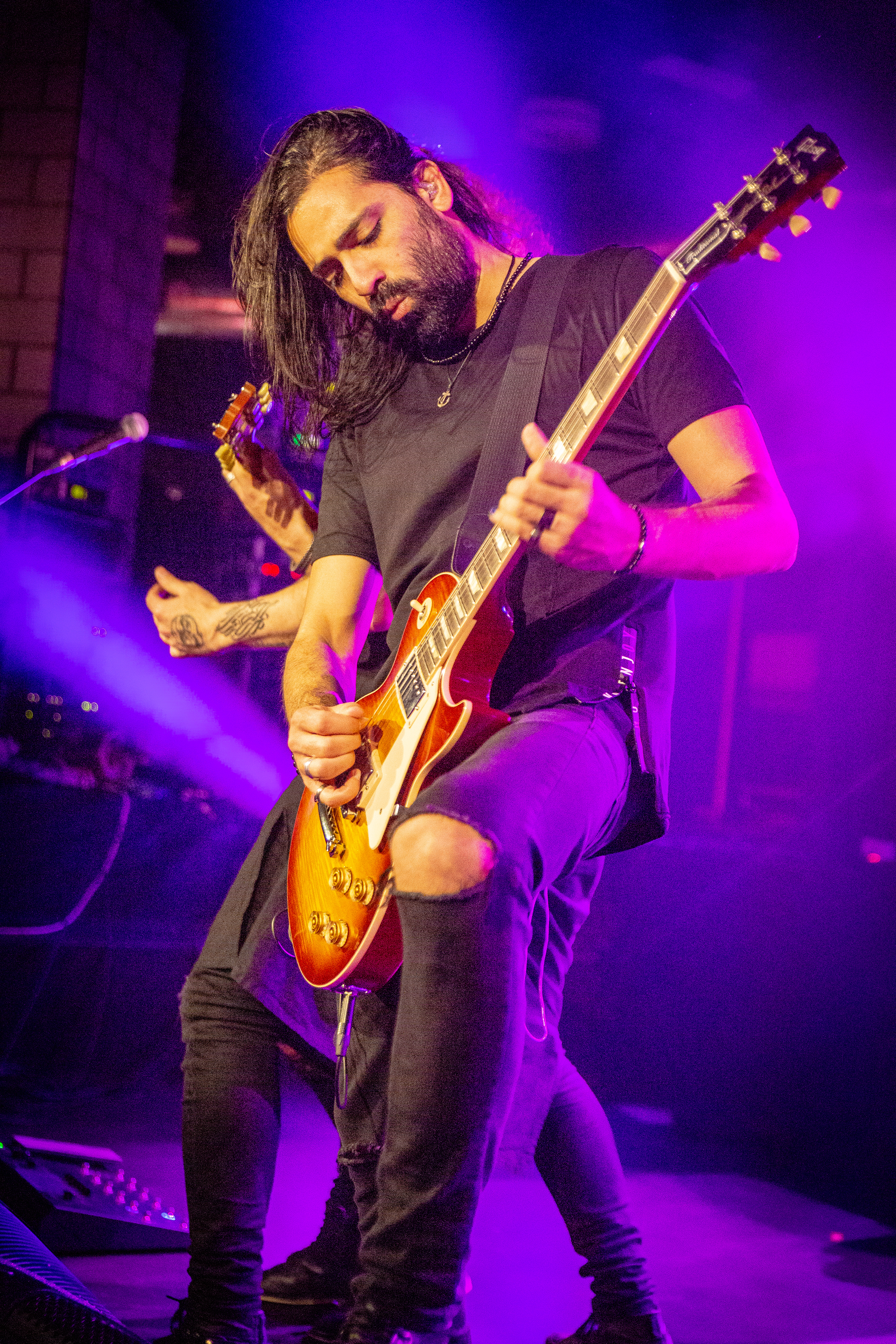
Idan Amsalem – guitarist

On 26 January 2018, Orphaned Land released their sixth album, entitled Unsung Prophets & Dead Messiahs, and is the band's fourth concept album. Once again utilizing the concepts of light and darkness to convey their message, the album is based around Plato's Allegory of the cave to explain how humanity embraces the darkness and are afraid to break their chains and embrace the light. Farhi considers it to be their "protest album". For Unsung Prophets & Dead Messiahs, Orphaned Land wanted to combine the accessible, "upfront" sound of All Is One with the conceptual and progressive sound of Mabool and ORwarriOR, believing that would lead to the creation of "the best Orphaned Land album".

In September 2018, Orphaned Land won the Video Of The Year award at the Progressive Music Awards 2018 in London, for their video, Like Orpheus. The music video is based on a true story about a Muslim girl who used to attend metal shows in Israel. A photo taken of her in a hijab with the lead singer of Behemoth in his corpse paint went viral, after which her parents forbade her from associating with the "metal world". The music video depicts a Haredi Jewish man and a Muslim woman attending a Kreator concert at night, while hiding their association with the metal community from their families.

In June 2021, Orphaned Land celebrated their 30th anniversary by playing a concert at the prestigious Heichal HaTarbut, the largest concert hall in Israel. Backed by the 45-piece Israel Chamber Opera Orchestra and Noa Gruman's Hellscore Choir, they are the first Israeli metal band to ever play a concert there. The show was attended by 2,400 people despite restrictions from the COVID-19 pandemic. The show was livestreamed, and thus the band had footage of the whole concert. On 1 December 2023, the show was released as a music and video album, named A Heaven You May Create. On 10 December 2021, the band released a box set containing all six of their solo studio albums, and the bonus songs from them, entitled 30 Years of Oriental Metal – Anniversary Album Collection, in tribute to their 30th anniversary.

== Artistry ==
Orphaned Land's lyrics promote a message of peace and unity, particularly between the three main Abrahamic religions (Judaism, Christianity, and Islam). The name "Orphaned Land" comes from the lyrics of a Yehuda Poliker song and reflects "a paradox" to the term "Holy Land". Four of their six albums are concept albums relating to the concept of light and darkness. Despite Orphaned Land's songs drawing on biblical themes, the band have said that they are not religious, with the majority of the band members identifying as atheist or agnostic, and ambivalent towards organized religion, blaming it as the cause of bloodshed and hatred. Orphaned Land's frontman Kobi Farhi claims that metal is a kind of "religion".

Orphaned Land has developed a large following across the Middle East and North Africa as well as Iran, and have been described as "ambassadors of peace" for their message of unity, despite the heavy metal genre being considered taboo in, and with the State of Israel being considered an enemy of many of these countries. In 2013, Orphaned Land toured Europe with the Palestinian band Khalas, which Farhi claims proved that Jewish-Muslim coexistence is possible. The two bands issued a split album with each other in 2021, entitled The Peace Series Vol. 1.

== Band members ==
Current members

- Kobi Farhi – lead vocals (1991–present)
- Uri Zelcha – bass (1991–present)
- Matan Shmuely – drums, percussion (2007–present)
- Chen Balbus – guitars, keyboards, saz, oud, backing vocals, glockenspiel (2011–present)
- Idan Amsalem – guitars, bouzouki, backing vocals (2014–present)

Former members

- Yossi Sassi – guitars, oud, saz, bouzouki, cümbüş, backing vocals (1991–2014)
- Matti Svatitzki – guitars (1991–2012)
- Sami Bachar – drums, percussion (1991–1997)
- Itzik Levy – keyboards, piano (1991–1997)
- Eran Asias – drums, percussion (2001–2004)
- Eden Rabin – keyboards, backing vocals (2001–2005)
- Avi Diamond – drums, percussion (2004–2007)

Former touring members

- Sharon Mansur - keyboards (2019–2020)
- Steven Wilson – keyboards (2010)
- Shlomit Levi – vocals (2004–2012)

Timeline

== Discography ==
=== Studio albums ===
Title	Album details	Peak chart positions			Sales
Title	Album details	BEL (WA)	FRA	GRE	Sales
Sahara	Released: 25 November 1994; Label: Holy Records; Formats: CD, CS, LP	—	—	—	
El Norra Alila	Released: 18 July 1996; Label: Holy Records; Formats: CD, CS, LP	—	—	—	
Mabool	Released: 23 February 2004; Label: Century Media Records; Formats: CD, LP, digital download	—	—	—	
The Never Ending Way of ORWarriOR	Released: 25 January 2010; Label: Century Media Records; Formats: CD, CD+DVD, LP, digital download	—	192	44	
All Is One	Released: 24 June 2013; Label: Century Media Records; Formats: CD, CD+DVD, LP, digital download	189	—	—	US: 400+
Unsung Prophets & Dead Messiahs	Released: 26 January 2018; Label: Century Media Records; Formats: CD, CD+DVD, LP, digital download	—	—	—	
"—" denotes a recording that did not chart or was not released in that territory.

=== Demos ===
Title	Album details
The Beloved's Cry	Released: 1993; Label: Self-released; Formats: CS

=== EPs ===
Title	Album details
Ararat	Released: 16 September 2005; Label: Profound Lore Records; Formats: LP
Sukkot in Berlin (EP)	Released: 22 June 2015; Label: soundsUP records; Formats: LP

=== Live albums ===
Title	Album details
The Road to OR-Shalem	Released: 24 October 2011; Label: Century Media Records; Formats: CD, DVD, DVD+CD, LP
A Heaven You May Create	Released: 1 December 2023; Label: Century Media Records; Formats: CD, DVD+CD, Digital, LP

=== Other albums ===
Title	Album details	Notes
Sentenced / Orphaned Land	Released: 2005; Label: Century Media Records; Formats: CD	split with Sentenced
Kna'an	Released: 2016; Label: Century Media Records; Formats: CD	with Amaseffer
Orphaned Land & Friends	Released: 2017; Label: Century Media Records; Formats: CD	
The Peace Series Vol. 1	Released: 2021; Taklitim Holim; Formats: Digital, LP	with Khalas

=== Box sets ===
Title	Album details
30 Years of Oriental Metal – Anniversary Album Collection	Released: 2021; Label: Century Media; Formats: CD

=== Music videos ===
Year	Title	Directed	Album
2004	"Ocean Land"	Yosi Arzi	Mabool
2004	"Norra El Norra"	Eli Klein	Mabool
2010	"Sapari"	Shahar Hamo, Matan Cohen	The Never Ending Way of ORWarriOr
2013	"Brother"	Ami Bornstein	All Is One
2013	"All Is One"	Shahar Hamo	All Is One
2014	"Let the Truce Be Known"	Vadim Machona	All Is One
2017	"Children"		
2017	"Like Orpheus"	Vadim Machona	Unsung Prophets & Dead Messiahs
2018	"We Do Not Resist"	Shahar Hemo	Unsung Prophets & Dead Messiahs
