= Mira Awad =

Arab-Israeli musical artist

Mira Awad ميرا أنور عوض מירה אנוואר עווד
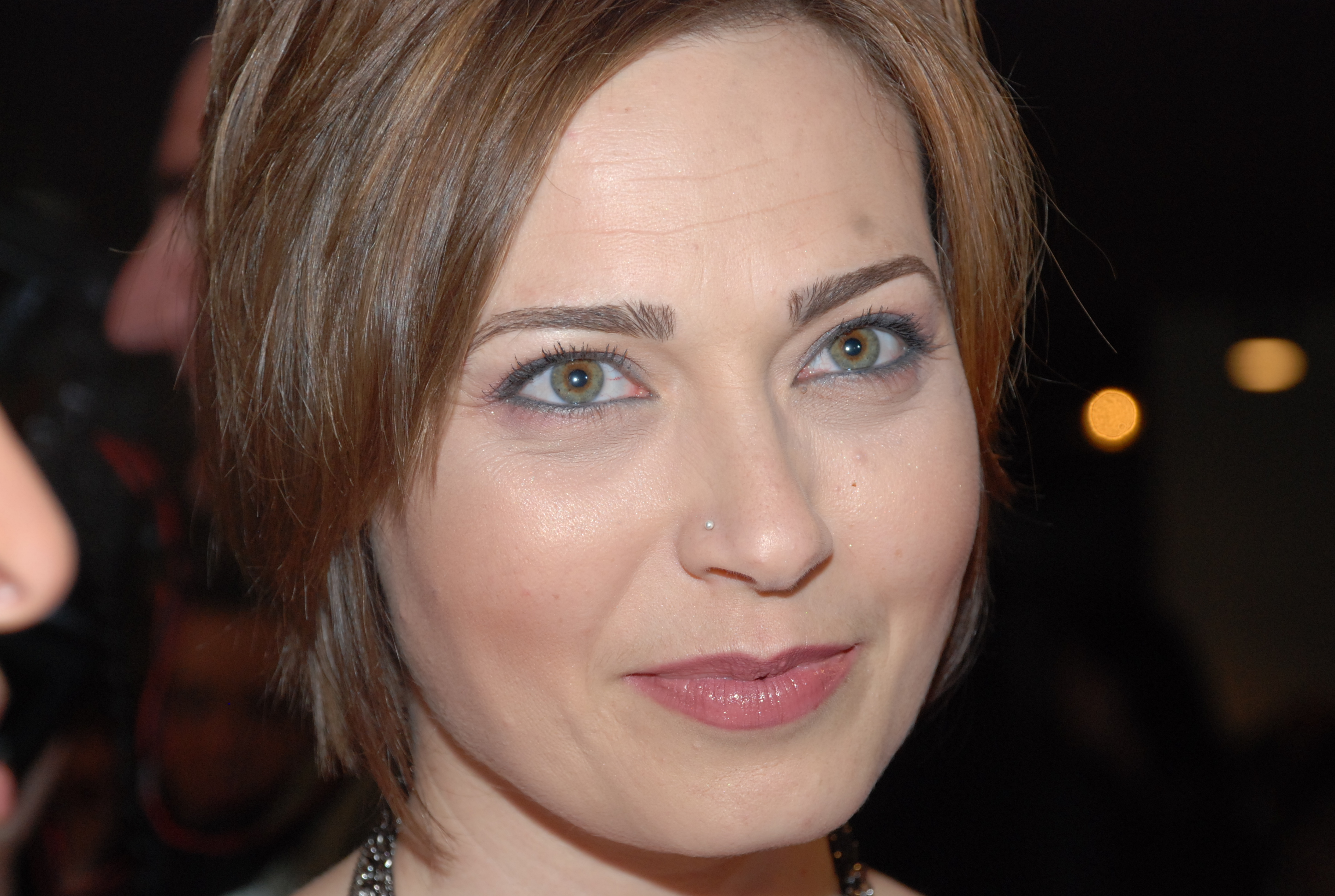
- Awad in 2009

Background information
- Born: Mira Anwar Awad; June 11, 1975 (age 51); Rameh, Israel
- Origin: Tel Aviv, Israel
- Genres: Pop; arabic music; world music
- Occupations: Singer-songwriter; actress; television host; political activist
- Instruments: Vocals; guitar
- Years active: 1991–present
- Labels: Helicon; Sony

Mira Anwar Awad (Arabic: ميرا أنور عوض, romanized: Mīrā Anwar ‘Awaḍ; Hebrew: מירה אנוואר עווד; born June 11, 1975) is a Palestinian-Israeli singer-songwriter, actress, television host, and political activist of Arab Palestinian and Bulgarian descent.

She represented Israel in the Eurovision Song Contest 2009 along with Jewish-Israeli singer Noa, with the song "There Must Be Another Way". She was the first singer of either Christian or Arab origin to represent Israel at Eurovision, as well as singing the first Israeli Eurovision song with partial Arabic lyrics.

== Early and personal life ==
Mira Anwar Awad was born in Rameh, Israel, to an Arab-Christian father Anwar Awad from the Galilee region in Israel, who is a physician, and a Bulgarian-Christian mother Snezhanka, an expert on Slavic languages. They met while her father studied medicine in Bulgaria.

She studied at the Rimon School of Jazz and Contemporary Music in Ramat HaSharon, Israel. Awad participated in improvisational workshops in Israel and the UK sponsored by the BIArts, British Council, and studied at the Body Theatre School after receiving a scholarship from the America-Israel Culture Foundation.

Awad lived in Tel Aviv with her husband Kosta Mogilevych, an Israeli of Ukrainian descent who is "half-Jewish," but they moved to London in the summer of 2022.

== Acting and singing career ==
At the age of 16, she was a soloist for the band Samana, which performed Western rock in Arabic. In the 1990s, she studied at the Rimon School of Jazz and Contemporary Music in Tel Aviv.

Awad became a star on Israeli television after appearing in the sitcom Arab Labor. She also appeared in The Bubble, a film by director Eytan Fox. She sang the theme songs for the films Forgiveness (directed by Udi Aloni), and Lemon Tree (directed by Eran Riklis).

In 2002, she collaborated with Achinoam Nini in a version of the Beatles song "We Can Work It Out." She appeared in an album of live performances of Greek singer George Dalaras. In the summer of 2002 she starred as Eliza Doolittle in the Israeli Opera production of My Fair Lady, directed by Micha Levinson, at the Tel Aviv Performing Arts Center. She also participated in the Israeli children's song festival "Festigal", performing the song Take the Journey. In 2005, Awad collaborated with The Idan Raichel Project on the song Azini (Comfort Me) on Idan Raichel's second album "Mi'ma'amakim."

In 2006, she appeared as an IDF soldier in the Cameri production of a musical adaptation of Maya Arad's novel in verse "Another Place, a Foreign City." In 2007, she played Amal, an Arab-Israeli human rights lawyer married to Amjad's Jewish friend, Meir, in the Israeli sitcom "Arab Labor."

In 2008, she played a Palestinian refugee in the stage production of "The Return to Haifa."

Awad represented Israel in the Eurovision Song Contest 2009, along with Achinoam Nini (known outside Israel as Noa). The song won a place in the Eurovision final on May 16, and eventually finished in 16th place with 53 points. Awad had previously tried to represent Israel in Eurovision 2005 with the song Zman (Time), but landed 8th place in the national final.

On May 15 Noa and Awad released a collaborative album There Must Be Another Way featuring both duets and solo tracks. Awad's debut solo album Acrobat (بهلوان, Bahlawan) was released in June, featuring songs she wrote and composed, in collaboration with Israeli guitarist Amos Ever-Hadani. In 2010, she was part of a panel that chose the song to represent Israel in Eurovision 2010 to be sung by Harel Skaat.

She participated in the fifth season of Rokdim Im Kokhavim, the Israeli version of Dancing with the Stars. Her dancing partner was Dani Yochtman. They reached the semi-final stage of the competition, coming in 4th place.

She also starred in the TV drama Noah's Ark, playing Ruthi. In 2013, Awad performed with Israeli heavy metal band Orphaned Land on their fifth album, All Is One, replacing their long-time female vocalist, Shlomit Levi.

In February 2025, Noa and Mira Awad performed at the first night of the Italian Sanremo Music Festival with a cover of "Imagine", addressing the Gaza war.

== Political views ==
Awad identifies herself as Palestinian and Israeli. While she has received criticism from both sides of the Palestinian–Israeli divide, she has many fans in both camps. The debate has exposed the uneasy position of the Arab citizens of Israel with their ties to both Israeli and Palestinian societies.

During the 2008 municipal elections to the city council of Tel Aviv-Yafo, Awad was a candidate from the Ir LeKulanu (lit. A City For All Of Us) party.

During the 2009 national elections in Israel, Awad voiced support for the Israeli-Arab Communist party, Hadash.

Prior to her participation in the 2009 Eurovision Song Contest representing Israel, Palestinian and Arab intellectuals circulated a petition calling on Awad not to take part in it. The petition failed to deter Awad and Noa, who said, as peace advocates, they expressed their "surprise" that the petition went around. Awad said it wouldn't be possible for her to "be used as a fig leaf to cover up the Israeli government's actions," she said. "The government didn't choose to send me to Eurovision. Noa and I agreed because of our eight-year collaboration."

On November 19, 2009, Awad and Noa were awarded the Haviva Reik Peace Prize from the Israeli Givat Haviva education institution, to honor their commitment to peace and dialogue between Jews and Arabs.

In December 2023, Awad spoke to El País about the Gaza war, criticizing the "blindness" of both Hamas and the Israeli government when it came to Gaza.

== Discography ==
Albums
Title	Details
Bahlawan / Acrobat	Released: 2009; Label: LabelFree Music
Write Down... (soundtrack for the film Write Down, I Am an Arab)	Released: 2014; Label: LabelFree Music

Singles
Title	Year	Details
Rita	2014	Arr. Shay Alon
Yousef	2014	Arr. Mira Awad and Ayal Yishay
Mother	2014	Arr. Shay Alon
Think of Others	2016	Arr. Mira Awad and Ayal Yishay; feat. Shay Alon, Ayal Yishay, and Etti Tevel

Awards and achievements
Preceded by Bo'az with The Fire In Your Eyes	Israel in the Eurovision Song Contest (with Noa); 2009	Succeeded by Harel Ska'at with Milim
