= The Never Ending Way of ORWarriOR =

The Never Ending Way of ORwarriOR

Studio album by Orphaned Land
- Released: January 25, 2010
- Recorded: 2007–2009
- Genres: Oriental metal, progressive metal
- Length: 78:22
- Label: Century Media
- Producers: Steven Wilson and Orphaned Land

Orphaned Land chronology
| Mabool (2004) | The Never Ending Way of ORwarriOR (2010) | All Is One (2013) |

Professional ratings
Review scores
| Source | Rating |
|---|---|
| Allmusic | 4/5 stars |
| Lords of Metal | (97/100) |
| Rock Sound | 8/10 stars |

The Never Ending Way of ORwarriOR is the fourth full-length studio album by the Israeli metal band Orphaned Land. The album was released on January 25, 2010, after many delays. In Hebrew, the word "or" (אור) means "light," thus ORwarriOR can be translated as "light warrior" or "warrior of light", representing a conceptual hero of the battle of light versus darkness. The Never Ending Way of ORWarriOR is Orphaned Land's third concept album and is about the battle between the darkness, a place of questions, and the light, a place of answers. The band related the concept to lighting a match in a dark room; without the match one cannot see anything, but with it one can see more, including the answers to the questions one has about the room before having lit the match. In this regard, "the warrior of light," the answers to unknown questions, is one's inner light, and not some messianic figure, and that to awaken the ORwarriOR, one must use their inner light to enlighten their inner soul, and find the answers they seek. This is an analogy to the band's belief that "there isn't any difference between you and your enemy." The album was mixed by Steven Wilson of Porcupine Tree. It is the last album to feature guitarist Matti Svatizky who left the band in 2012.

== Background ==
By August 24, 2009 ORwarriOR's final mixes were almost ready. Several songs from the new material were performed live at Brutal Assault festival (June 8, 2009, Czech Republic). The album also includes a "follow-up" to a track previously released on "El Norra Alila: Deluxe edition" (2006) "Disciples of the Sacred Oath" - "Disciples of the Sacred Oath II."

The album contains 15 songs that add up to approximately 78 minutes. The album's artwork contains no digitally manipulated images; instead, it contains customized calligraphy in both Arabic and Hebrew. On ORwarriOR, Kobi Farhi sings in English, Hebrew and Arabic. The album was released along with a DVD.

On September 7, 2009 Orphaned Land's official website published a short teaser of the album's introductory piece.

The album was preceded by release of the "Sapari" single. "Sapari" is a medieval Yemenite Jewish song, attributed to Rabbi Saadia Ben Amram, and arranged in metal style by Orphaned Land. Orphaned Land's singer Shlomit Levi, who is Yemenite Jewish herself, frequently plays Sapari live, and Dror, a Middle Eastern singer promoting peace between Jews and Arabs, also released a version of this song.

After the release of "Sapari", a 2:40 cut of the song "Vayehi Or" was released through the band's Myspace page. Shortly after, the time listing was revealed. On January 5, 2010 the song "Disciples of the Sacred Oath II" became available for streaming through the band's Myspace page.

There are numerous packages of the album. Along with the original and limited editions, the album is sold along with an Orphaned Land T-shirt or along with postcards, posters, magnets, 28-page mediabook or a special "Disciples Package" that includes collectible items along with a brand new "Disciples t-shirt". They are found on the different websites that sell Orphaned Land merchandise, such as the official website, the official fanclub (Orphaned Disciples), etc.

During February 2010, the official music video of "Sapari" was released to the public. Within the first week of being released in the United States, this album sold 600 copies and reached 80th place on the Billboard Heatseekers chart. In early 2011, the album was rated the Metal Storm #1 progressive metal album for the year 2010.

== Track listing ==
=== Part I: Godfrey's Cordial – An ORphan's Life ===
1. "Sapari" – 4:04
2. "From Broken Vessels" – 7:36
3. "Bereft in the Abyss" – 2:45
4. "The Path (Part 1) – Treading Through Darkness" – 7:27
5. "The Path (Part 2) – The Pilgrimage to Or Shalem" – 7:45
6. "Olat Ha'tamid" – 2:38

=== Part II: Lips Acquire Stains – The WarriOR Awakens ===
7. "The Warrior" – 7:11
8. "His Leaf Shall Not Wither" – 2:31
9. "Disciples of the Sacred Oath II" – 8:31
10. "New Jerusalem" – 6:59
11. "Vayehi Or" – 2:40
12. "M i ?" – 3:27

=== Part III: Barakah – Enlightening the Cimmerian ===
13. "Barakah" – 4:13
14. "Codeword: Uprising" – 5:25
15. "In Thy Never Ending Way" – 5:09

=== DVD bonus track ===
1. "Estarabim" (Erkin Koray Cover) – 5:13

=== Tour Edition bonus tracks ===
1. "Estarabim" (Edit; Erkin Koray Cover) – 4:40
2. "Above You All" - 4:53
3. "Pits of Despair" - 4:19
4. "Sapari" Instrumental - 3:45
5. "Bereft in the Abyss" Instrumental - 2:50

== Personnel ==
=== Band members ===
- Kobi Farhi − vocals, backing vocals, death growls, chants, spoken reading
- Yossi Sassi − lead guitar, clean guitars, acoustic guitars, classic guitars, saz, bouzouki, oud, chumbush, backing vocals
- Matti Svatitzki − rhythm guitar, clean guitars, acoustic guitars
- Uri Zelcha − bass, fretless bass

Additional personnel

- Erkin Koray - lead vocals on Estarabim
- Avi Diamond − drums, percussion
- Steven Wilson − keyboards, production
- Shlomit Levi − Yemenite female vocals
