= Shlomit Levi =

Israeli singer

Shlomit Levi שלומית לוי
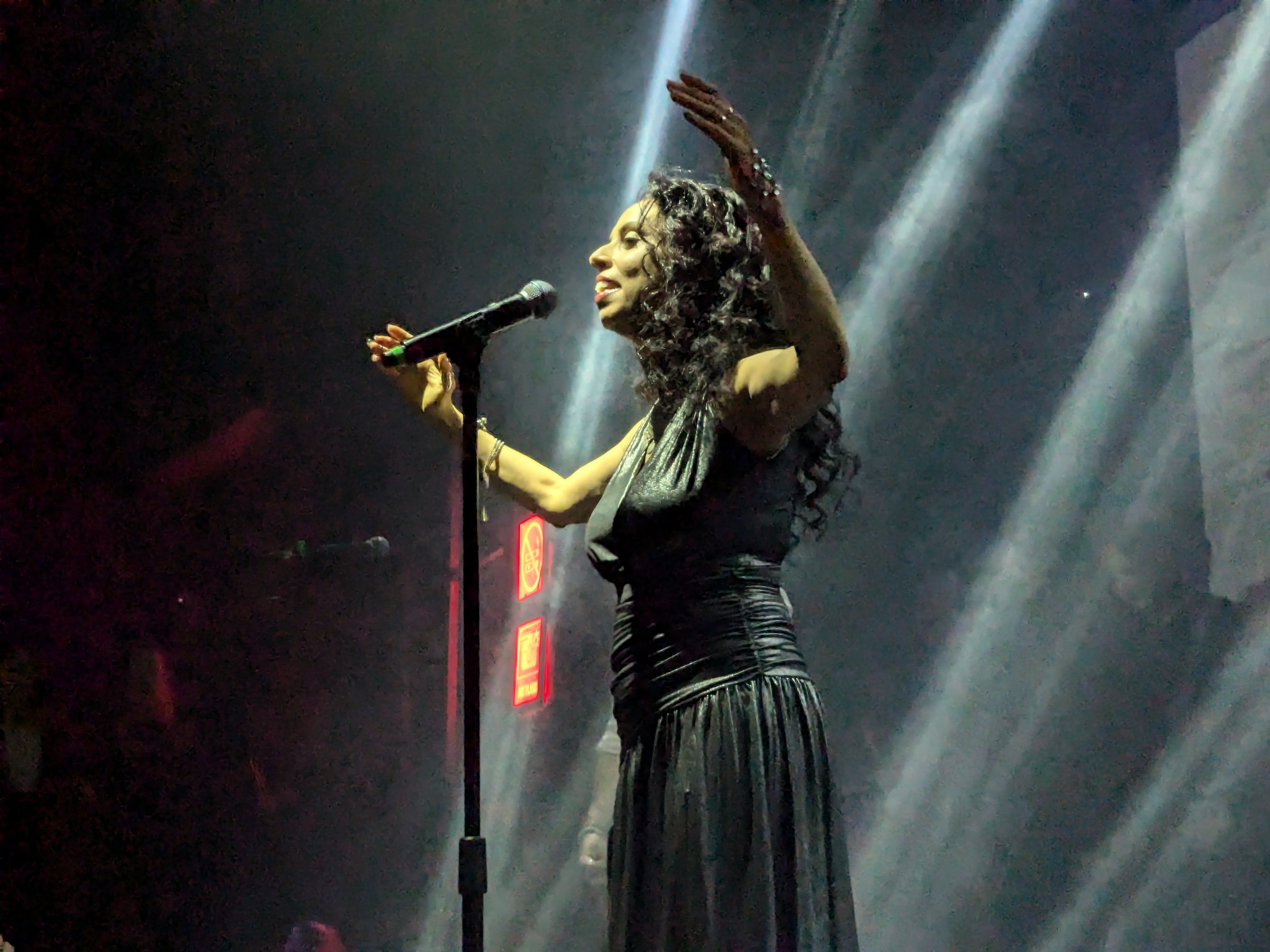

Background information
- Born: Shlomit Levi; Kiryat Ekron, Israel
- Genres: World music, Middle Eastern music, Mizrahi, folk rock, folk metal
- Instrument: Vocals
- Years active: 2004–present
- Website: www.shlomit-rebbesoul.com

Shlomit Levi (Hebrew: שלומית לוי) is an Israeli singer. She is a member of the folk metal group Orphaned Land, performing on their albums Mabool (2004), The Never Ending Way of ORWarriOR (2010) and Unsung Prophets & Dead Messiahs (2018). She currently performs with American guitarist Bruce Burger as the world music duo Shlomit & RebbeSoul.

== Early life ==
Levi was born in Kiryat Ekron to a Yemenite Jewish family before moving to Rehovot when she was 10. Her parents came to Israel from Yemen as teenagers during Operation Magic Carpet. She began singing at the age of three and was exposed to traditional Yemenite music by her mother and grandmother, although she preferred listening to Western and Israeli music to fit in with her friends. She stopped singing Yemenite music as a teenager but was later drawn back to it after hearing Ofra Haza's Yemenite Songs album.

Levi attended Orthodox schools for first through fourth grades. After serving in the Israel Defense Forces, Levi studied cognitive psychology at Ben-Gurion University of the Negev, receiving a master's degree focused on user interface design and a BA in social sciences. During her time in college, she connected with student musicians and studied with a Black Hebrew voice teacher from Dimona. After graduation, she briefly worked at a tech company in Airport City before deciding to pursue a music career.

== Career ==
=== Orphaned Land ===
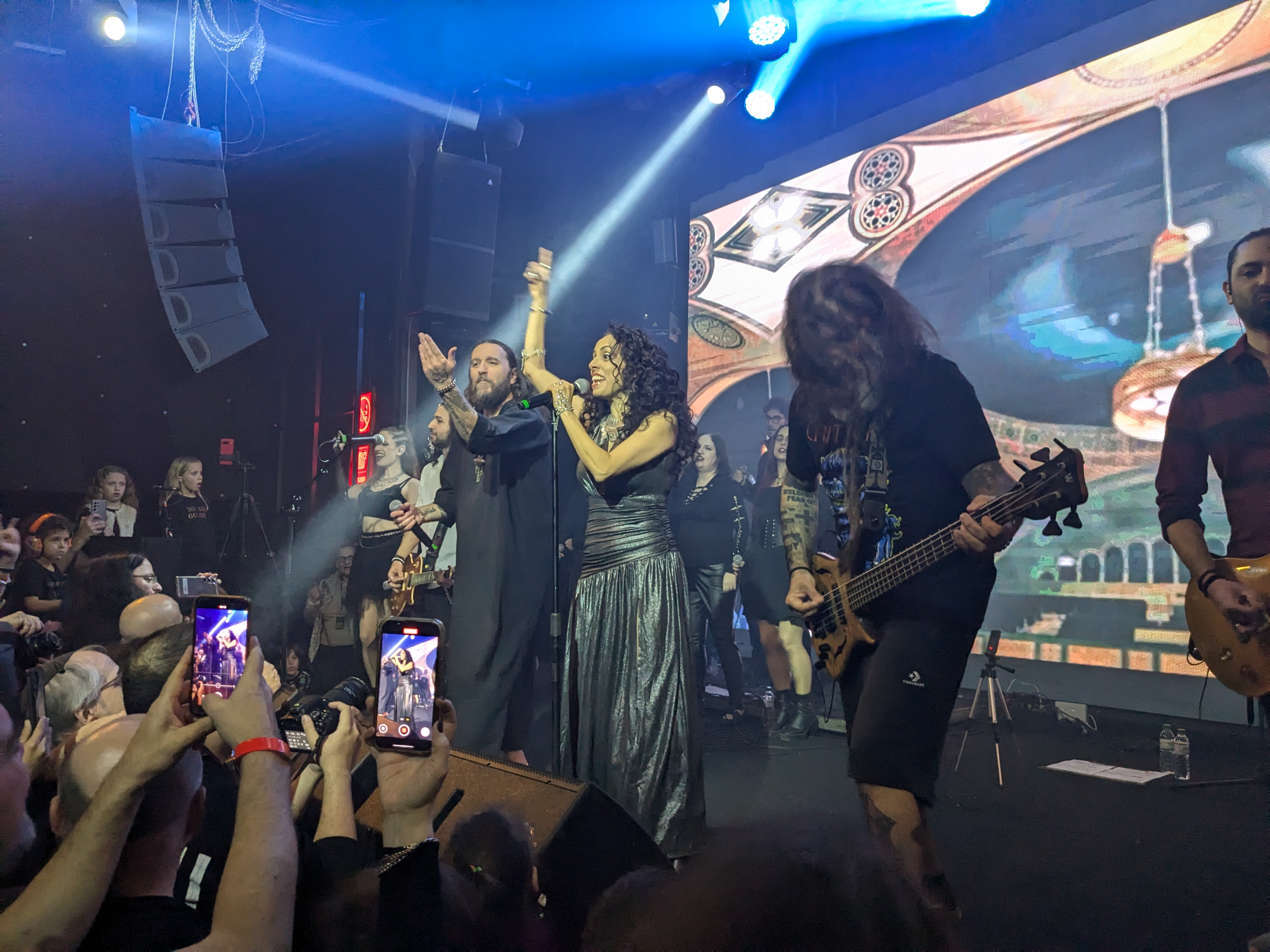
Performing with Orphand Land in 2024 concert in Tel Aviv

Levi was put in touch by a mutual friend with the group Orphaned Land, who were auditioning female singers. At her audition, she impressed the band with her ability to sing mawwal. While not an official member, she toured with the band from 2004 to 2012 and appeared on two of their albums, Mabool (2004) and The Never Ending Way of ORWarriOR (2010).

=== Shlomit and RebbeSoul ===
In 2011, Levi was introduced by Yedidia Snir to American musician Bruce Burger ("RebbeSoul"), who had recently moved to Israel. They began collaborating as Shlomit & RebbeSoul and released an album, The Seal of Solomon, in 2015. She also collaborated with Burger and oudist George Simaan on a version of "Erev Shel Shoshanim".

== Personal life ==
Levi lived in Kibbutz Givat Haim Ihud before moving to Tenafly, New Jersey in 2013 and later to Cresskill. She is married to Boaz Arzi, a software engineer, and has two daughters.

== Discography ==
=== Solo ===
- Shlomit Levi (Demo, 2009)

=== With Orphaned Land ===
- Mabool (2004)
- Sentenced/Orphaned Land (2005)
- Ararat EP (2005)
- The Never Ending Way of ORWarriOR (2010)
- The Road to OR-Shalem (2011)
- Unsung Prophets & Dead Messiahs (2018)

=== Shlomit & RebbeSoul ===
- The Seal of Solomon (2015)
