= El Nora Alila =

Jewish Yom Kippur piyyut

El Nora Alila (Hebrew: אֵל נוֹרָא עֲלִילָה, lit. 'God, awesome in deeds'), also transliterated as Ayl Nora Alilah, is a piyyut (liturgical poem) that begins the Ne'ilah service at the conclusion of Yom Kippur in Judaism. The piyyut is recited as part of the Sephardic and Mizrahi rites, and has been adopted by some religious Ashkenazi Jewish communities.

The English translation below is a lyric rendering, reproducing a rhyme similar to the Hebrew one. A more literal translation renders the title and recurring line as "God of awesome deeds". It consists of eight stanzas, each stanza consisting of four lines of five syllables to the line. Each line (in Hebrew) has three words, and the fourth line is always two words, "as Thy gates are closed at night". The closed gates are likely the gates of Heaven, where prayers of repentance are received, possibly also referencing the gates of the Temple in Jerusalem as described in Ezekiel 46:2. The hymn serves as a final, heartfelt plea for divine forgiveness during the last moments of the Day of Atonement. The initial letters of the eight stanzas of the piyyut spell out משה חזק תם (Moshe ḥazak tam, 'Moses, may he be perfectly strong') in reference to the piyyut's author, Moses ibn Ezra (c. 1055–1138) of Granada.

== Text ==
Hebrew text

אֵל נוֹרָא עֲלִילָה, אֵל נוֹרָא עֲלִילָה
.הַמְצִיא לָנוּ מְחִילָה, בִּשְׁעַת הַנְּעִילָה

מְתֵי מִסְפָּר קְרוּאִים, לְךָ עַיִן נוֹשְׂאִים
.וּמְסַלְּדִים בְּחִילָה, בִּשְׁעַת הַנְּעִילָה

שׁוֹפְכִים לְךָ נַפְשָׁם, מְחֵה פִּשְׁעָם וְכַחְשַׁם
.וְהַמְצִיאֵם מְחִילָה, בִּשְׁעַת הַנְּעִילָה

הֱיֵה לָהֶם לְסִתְרָה, וְהַצִילֵם מִמְּאֵרָה
.וְחָתְמֵם לְהוֹד וּלְגִילָה, בִּשְׁעַת הַנְּעִילָה

חוֹן אוֹתָם וְרַחֵם, וְכָל לוֹחֵץ וְלוֹחֵם
.עֲשֵׂה בָּהֶם פְּלִילָה, בִּשְׁעַת הַנְּעִילָה

זְכֹר צִדְקַת אֲבִיהֶם, וְחַדֵּשׁ אֶת יְמֵיהֶם
.כְּקֶדֶם וּתְחִלָּה, בִּשְׁעַת הַנְּעִילָה

קְרָא נָּא שְׁנַת רָצוֹן, וְהָשֵׁב שְׁאָר הַצֹּאן
.לְאָהֳלִיבָה וְאָהֳלָה, בִּשְׁעַת הַנְּעִילָה

תִּזְכּוּ לְשָׁנִים רַבּוֹת, הַבָּנִים וְהָאָבוֹת
.בְּדִיצָה וּבְצָהֳלָה, בִּשְׁעַת הַנְּעִילָה

מִיכָאֵל שַׂר יִשְׂרָאֵל, אֵלִיָּהוּ וְגַבְרִיאֵל
.בַּשְּׂרוּ נָא הַגְּאֻלָּה, בִּשְׁעַת הַנְּעִילָה

Transliteration

Refrain: El nora ‘alila, El nora ‘alila,
Ham'tzi lanu mechila, bish‘at hane‘ila.

Metei mispar k'ru’im, lecha ‘ayin nos’im,
um'saldim bechila, bish‘at hane‘ila.

Shofchim lecha nafsham, meche pish‘am vechaħsham,
veham'tzi’em m'chila, bish‘at hane‘ila.

Heye lahem lesitra, vehatzilem mim’era,
vechotmem lehod ul'gila, bish‘at hane‘ila.

Chon otam verachem, vechol lochetz velochem,
Oseh bahem p'lila, bish‘at hane‘ila.

Z'chor tzidkat avihem, vechadesh et yemeihem,
kekedem ut'chila, bish‘at hane‘ila.

K'ra na sh'nat ratzon, vehashev sh‘ar hatzon,
le’Oholiva ve’Ohola, bish‘at hane‘ila.

Tizku leshanim rabot, habanim veha’avot,
b'ditza uv'tzohola, bish‘at hane‘ila.

Micha’el sar Yisra’el, Eliyahu veGavri’el,
Basru na hage’ulah, bish‘at hane‘ila.

Interpretive rhyming English

Refrain: God of awe, God of might, God of awe, God of might,
Grant us pardon in this hour, As Thy gates are closed this night.

We who few have been from yore, Raise our eyes to heaven's height,
Trembling, fearful in our prayer, As Thy gates are closed this night.

Pouring out our soul we pray That the sentence Thou wilt write
Shall be one of pardoned sin, As Thy gates are closed this night.

God, our refuge strong and sure, Rescue us from dreadful plight;
Seal our destiny for joy, As Thy gates are closed this night.

Grant us favor, show us grace; But of all who wrest the right
And oppress, be Thou the judge, As Thy gates are closed this night.

Generations of our sires Strong in faith walked in Thy light.
As of old, renew our days, As Thy gates are closed this night.

Gather Judah's scattered flock Unto Zion's rebuilt site.
Bless this year with grace divine, As Thy are closed this night.

May we all, both old and young, Look for gladness and delight
In the many years to come, As Thy gates are closed this night.

Michael, Prince of Israel, Gabriel, Thy angels bright,
With Elijah, come, redeem, As Thy gates are closed this night.

== Melodies ==
El Nora Alila - Iraq, Baghdad version, Performers: Yaakov Huri and a group, recorded by: Edith Gerson-Kiwi in Jerusalem 1958

El Nora Alila - Greek Version, Greece, Larissa Performer: Itzhak Meizan Recorded by: Amnon Shiloah In Larissa, 1970.

El Nora Alila has been described as "that powerful and all-engulfing hymn of the Sephardim ... ascendant and aggressive in the highest degree." There are at least eighty versions of the melody sung across four continents. The melody for El Nora Alila is generally sprightly, as is much of the Ne'ilah service, deliberately, coming at the end of a 25-hour fast, when the congregants are probably feeling fatigue and weakness.

== See also ==
- Yom Kippur
- Ne'ilah
