= Mabool =

Mabool: The Story of the Three Sons of Seven

Studio album by Orphaned Land
- Released: February 23, 2004
- Recorded: July–October, 2003, Zaza Studios, Bardo Studios, Israel
- Genre: Progressive metal Oriental metal Folk metal
- Length: 67:58; The Calm Before the Flood; 26:48
- Label: Century Media
- Producer: Orphaned Land

Orphaned Land chronology
El Norra Alila (1996)	Mabool: The Story of the Three Sons of Seven (2004)	The Never Ending Way of ORwarriOR (2010)

Mabool LP album
- Limited edition LP album cover

Mabool: The Story of the Three Sons of Seven is the third full-length studio album by the Israeli metal band Orphaned Land. It was released on February 23, 2004, through Century Media Records. One limited edition version of the album has a bonus CD entitled The Calm Before the Flood containing live acoustic tracks, while another limited-edition version was released by Profound Lore Records as a 2-LP album with alternate cover art in a clear wax case limited to only 500 copies. Two videos were made for the album, one for the song "Ocean Land" and the other for the song "Norra el Norra", and were the band's first music videos. Mabool is Orphaned Land's second concept album. "Mabool" (מבול) is the Hebrew word for "flood," and refers to the Genesis flood narrative from which the album's concept, the band's reinterpretation of Noah's Ark, is derived.

The album was made in a highly arranged fashion and took six years to be arranged, composed and produced and is therefore the main reason for the long wait between albums.

== Synopsis ==
The album tells the story of the three sons (angels) split from the seventh descendant of the seventh (God's seven descendents were Abraham, Isaac, Jacob, Sarah, Rebecca, Rachel, and Leah [not specified in the album]). The seventh was divided into three, representing the divide of the Abrahamic religion into three main streams: Judaism, Islam and Christianity.

Each angel bore the face of an animal and was given a power and representation. The first angel is the snake Judaism; he is represented by a Star of David and his power is magic. The second angel is the eagle Islam; he is represented by a half moon and his power is strength. The third angel is the lion Christianity; he is represented by the cross and his power is wisdom. Fearing their strength, God forbade the angels from reuniting into one.

Defying the divine order, the angels united into one, who was then immediately exiled from Heaven to Earth and divided into three again, sentenced to fight each other until they can prove themselves and get back into Heaven. As they were cast down to Earth, they foresaw a prophecy, that if humanity could not stop sinning, then God would flood the Earth to cleanse the land.

The angels then embark on a quest to warn humanity of the flood and try to convince them to stop their sins, but ultimately fail to do so. God orders the three angels to build an ark of gopher wood and save two of each animal. It rains for 40 days and 40 nights during which a flood destroys society, and an ocean buries the land. The album concludes with the three angels praying to God to guide the ark onto dry land.

== Reception ==
Professional ratings
Review scores
Source	Rating
Allmusic	4.5/5 stars
Metal Storm	(9.03/10)
Sputnikmusic	5/5 stars

As of March 8, 2020, Mabool has a rating of 8.85 based on 738 votes on Metal Storm. This average ranks the album as the 4th best record of 2004 and the 96th best album of all time on Metal Storm.

== Track listing ==
1. "Birth of the Three (The Unification)" – 6:57
2. "Ocean Land (The Revelation)" – 4:43
3. "The Kiss of Babylon (The Sins)" – 7:23
4. "A'salk" – 2:05
5. "Halo Dies (The Wrath of God)" – 7:29
6. "A Call to Awake (The Quest)" – 6:10
7. "Building the Ark" – 5:02
8. "Norra el Norra (Entering the Ark)" – 4:24
9. "The Calm Before the Flood" – 4:25
10. "Mabool (The Flood)" – 6:59
11. "The Storm Still Rages Inside" – 9:20
12. "Rainbow (The Resurrection)" – 3:01

The Calm Before the Flood track listing:

1. "The Evil Urge" – 3:28
2. "A Never Ending Way" – 3:14
3. "Mercy" (Paradise Lost cover from One Second) – 3:46
4. "The Beloved's Cry" – 6:42
5. "The Orphaned's Medley" – 9:33

== Personnel ==
=== Band members ===
- Kobi Farhi – vocals, backing vocals, death growls, chants, spoken reading
- Yossi Saharon (Sasi) – lead guitar, clean guitars, acoustic guitars, classic guitars, saz, bouzouki, oud, solos on tracks 1, 5, 6, 7, and 11.
- Matti Svatitzki – rhythm guitar, clean guitars, acoustic guitars, solos on tracks 2 and 5.
- Uri Zelcha – bass, fretless bass
- Eden Rabin – keyboards, synthesizers, piano

=== Session members and guest musicians ===
- Avi Diamond – drums
- Avi Agababa – percussion
- Shlomit Levi – Yemenite female vocals

Oriental choir

- David Sassi
- Avi Ratzon
- Yariv Malka
- Kobi Farhi
- Yossi Sassi
- Eden Rabin
- Erez Caspi

Moran ensemble

- Tali Ketzef
- Neta Gev
- Neta Kirschenbaum
- Michal Front
- Yael Front
- Naama Aharony
- Reut Venforero
- Noa Kalush
- Liad Dahari
- Rachel Reuven
- Yair Goren
- Yair Polishuk
- Eden Rabin
- Kobi Farhi
- Yossi Sassi

=== Production and other ===
- All music composed between the years 1997 and 2003 by Yossi Sassi, Matti Svatizki, Eden Rabin, Kobi Farhi, and Uri Zalcha (except song 8 – Egyptian Traditional).
- Additional composition on songs 1, 5, 6, 10 by Sami Bachar.
- Production management and arrangements by Kobi Farhi with the help of all Orphaned Land members.
- Recording Engineer: Erez Caspi
- Additional Recording Engineer: Simon Vinestock, Daniel Ya'ari
- Assistant Engineer: Marselo David Kovalsky, Rafi Nahmias
- "Moazin" (end of song 2) were sung and recorded secretly in Taj Mahal, India by Kobi Farhi.
- Intro and Thunders were recorded by Kobi Farhi in India and Israel.

Concept and lyrics

- Kobi Farhi and Alon Miasnikov
- Additional lyrics by Eden Rabin
- All Hebrew and Latin texts (songs 5, 7, 11) taken from the Book of Genesis (Flood Story).
- Hebrew and Yemen texts (songs 3, 4) taken from Rabbi Shalom Shabazi's (1619–1720) poems and from "Halel" praising song (song 8).
