= Israel in the Eurovision Song Contest 2011 =

- Eurovision Song Contest 2011
- Country: Israel
- Selection process: Kdam Eurovision 2011
- Selection date: 8 March 2011

Competing entry
- Song: "Ding Dong"
- Artist: Dana International
- Songwriters: Dana International

Placement
- Semi-final result: Failed to qualify (15th)

Participation chronology

Israel was represented at the Eurovision Song Contest 2011 with the song "Ding Dong" written and performed by Dana International, who had previously represented Israel in the Eurovision Song Contest in 1998 where she won the contest with the song "Diva". The Israeli entry for the 2011 contest in Düsseldorf, Germany was selected through the national final Kdam Eurovision 2011, organised by the Israeli broadcaster Israel Broadcasting Authority (IBA). The competition took place on 8 March 2011 that featured ten entries. "Ding Dong" performed by Dana International emerged as the winner after achieving the highest score following the combination of votes from three thematical jury groups, a twelve-member jury panel and a public vote.

Israel was drawn to compete in the second semi-final of the Eurovision Song Contest which took place on 12 May 2011. Performing during the show in position 12, "Ding Dong" was not announced among the top 10 entries of the second semi-final and therefore did not qualify to compete in the final. It was later revealed that Israel placed fifteenth out of the 19 participating countries in the semi-final with 38 points.

== Background ==
Prior to the 2011 contest, Israel had participated in the Eurovision Song Contest thirty-three times since its first entry in 1973. Israel has won the contest on three occasions: in 1978 with the song "A-Ba-Ni-Bi" performed by Izhar Cohen and the Alphabeta, in 1979 with the song "Hallelujah" performed by Milk and Honey and in 1998 with the song "Diva" performed by Dana International. Since the introduction of semi-finals to the format of the Eurovision Song Contest in 2004, Israel has, to this point, managed to qualify to the final five times, including two top ten results in 2005 with Shiri Maimon and "HaSheket SheNish'ar" placing fourth, and in 2008 with Boaz and "The Fire in Your Eyes" placing ninth. Israel had qualified to the final for three consecutive years between 2008 and 2010, which included their 2010 entry "Milim" performed by Harel Skaat.

The Israeli national broadcaster, Israel Broadcasting Authority (IBA) had been in charge of the nation's participation in the contest since its debut in 1973. IBA confirmed Israel's participation in the contest on 21 September 2010. On 2 November 2010, IBA announced that a national final under a new format with several entries competing over no less than six shows would be organised in order to select the Israeli entry for 2011. This was the first time since 2006 that the Israeli entry would be selected through an open competition; IBA conducted an internal selection to select the artist that would represent Israel and a national final to select the song for the artist between 2007 and 2010. It was later announced that the format had been revised and the national final would consist of only one show instead.

== Before Eurovision ==
=== Kdam Eurovision 2011 ===
The Israeli entry for the Eurovision Song Contest 2011 was selected through the national final Kdam Eurovision 2011. The competition took place on 8 March 2011 at the Culture Hall in Rishon LeZion, hosted by 2005 Israeli Eurovision entrant Shiri Maimon and Aki Avni and was broadcast on Channel 1 as well as online via IBA's official Eurovision Song Contest website Eurovil.

==== Competing entries ====
On 28 December 2010, IBA opened the public application with the deadline on 25 January 2011. IBA also directly invited artists to participate in the competition. Artists that applied for the competition were then required to submit two to three songs each and ten entries were chosen by a special committee consisting of music industry professionals and members from IBA and announced on 8 February 2011. Among the competing artists was the winner of the Eurovision Song Contest 1998, Dana International. The members of the committee were Yaakov Naveh (IBA artists representative), Yoav Ginai (entertainment director of IBA), Noam Gil-Or (director of Reshet Gimmel), Yuval Ganor (director of 88FM), Rina Hachmon (Kdam Eurovision producer), Idit Ben Eliyahu (producer of the Channel 1 programme Local Noise), Yossi Gispan (lyricist), David Krivoshei (musician), Izhar Cohen (winner of the Eurovision Song Contest 1978), Gilad Segev (musician) and Tal Barnea (former EBU project manager). The competing songs were presented during a press conference together with the running order on 28 February 2011 held at the Shablul Jazz Club in Tel Aviv and hosted by Shiri Maimon and Aki Avni. On 20 February 2011, "Lirkod" performed by Vladi Blayberg was withdrawn from the competition and initially replaced with the song "Suicide for Love" performed by Adi Cesare, which was also withdrawn on 23 February 2011 and replaced with the song "Nosa'at el ga'agu'ay" performed by Carmel Eckmann.

Artist	Song	Songwriter(s)
Adi Cohen	"Rak Al Ahava" (רק על אהבה)	Doron Gal
Knob	"Ohev Et Ze" (אוהב את זה)	Meital Patash-Cohen, Niv Cohen
Chen Aharoni	"Or" (אור)	Nitzan Kaikov, Sahar Hagai
Idit Halevi	"It's My Time"	Giora Linenberg, Idit Halevi
Hatikva 6	"Hakol Sababa" (הכל סבבה)	Omri Glikman
Niki Goldstein	"Amri Itach" (אמריא איתך)	Amit Zach, Einat Hollander
Sivan Bahnem	"Kach Oti" (קח אותי)	Sivan Bahnem, Chen Metzger-Eder
Michael and Shimrit Greylsummer	"Tu Du Du" (טו דו דו)	Michael Greylsummer
Dana International	"Ding Dong"	Dana International
Carmel Eckmann	"Nosa'at El Ga'agu'ay" (נוסעת אל געגועיי)	Ben Rayvitz, Carmel Eckmann

==== Final ====
The final took place on 8 March 2011. Ten entries competed and the winner, "Ding Dong" performed by Dana International, was selected by a combination of the votes from five voting groups: three thematical jury groups (12%), an expert jury (40%) and a public vote (48%). The public vote that took place during the show was conducted through telephone and SMS. In addition to the performances of the competing entries, the show hosts Shiri Maimon and Aki Avni, the Voca People and Pnina Rosenblum and Tzioprale's Ansambel Group performed as the interval acts. The expert jury panel that voted in the final consisted of Amir Gilat (Head of IBA), Yaakov Naveh (IBA artists representative), Izhar Cohen (winner of the Eurovision Song Contest 1978), Yoav Ginai (entertainment director of IBA), Noam Gil-Or (director of Reshet Gimmel), Rina Hachmon (Kdam Eurovision producer), Idit Ben Eliyahu (producer of the Channel 1 programme Local Noise), Gilad Segev (musician), Tal Barnea (former EBU project manager), Yossi Gispan (lyricist), David Krivoshei (musician) and Yuval Ganor (director of 88FM).

Final – 8 March 2011
Draw	Artist	Song	Jury	Televote	Total	Place
1	Adi Cohen	"Rak Al Ahava"	123	96	219	3
2	Knob	"Ohev Et Ze"	32	48	80	8
3	Chen Aharoni	"Or"	82	60	142	4
4	Idit Halevi	"It's My Time"	91	144	235	2
5	Hatikva 6	"Hakol Sababa"	81	24	105	7
6	Niki Goldstein	"Amri Itach"	53	84	137	5
7	Sivan Bahnem	"Kach Oti"	29	36	65	10
8	Michael and Shimrit Greylsummer	"Tu Du Du"	59	72	131	6
9	Dana International	"Ding Dong"	150	120	270	1
10	Carmel Eckmann	"Nosa'at El Ga'agu'ay"	54	12	66	9

Detailed Jury Voting Results
Draw	Song	Group 1	Group 2	Group 3	Ex. jury	Total
1	"Rak Al Ahava"	8	7	8	100	123
2	"Ohev Et Ze"	1	1	10	20	32
3	"Or"	2	3	7	70	82
4	"It's My Time"	5	4	2	80	91
5	"Hakol Sababa"	6	10	5	60	81
6	"Amri Itach"	7	2	4	40	53
7	"Kach Oti"	4	12	3	10	29
8	"Tu Du Du"	3	5	1	50	59
9	"Ding Dong"	12	6	12	120	150
10	"Nosa'at El Ga'agu'ay"	10	8	6	30	54

== At Eurovision ==
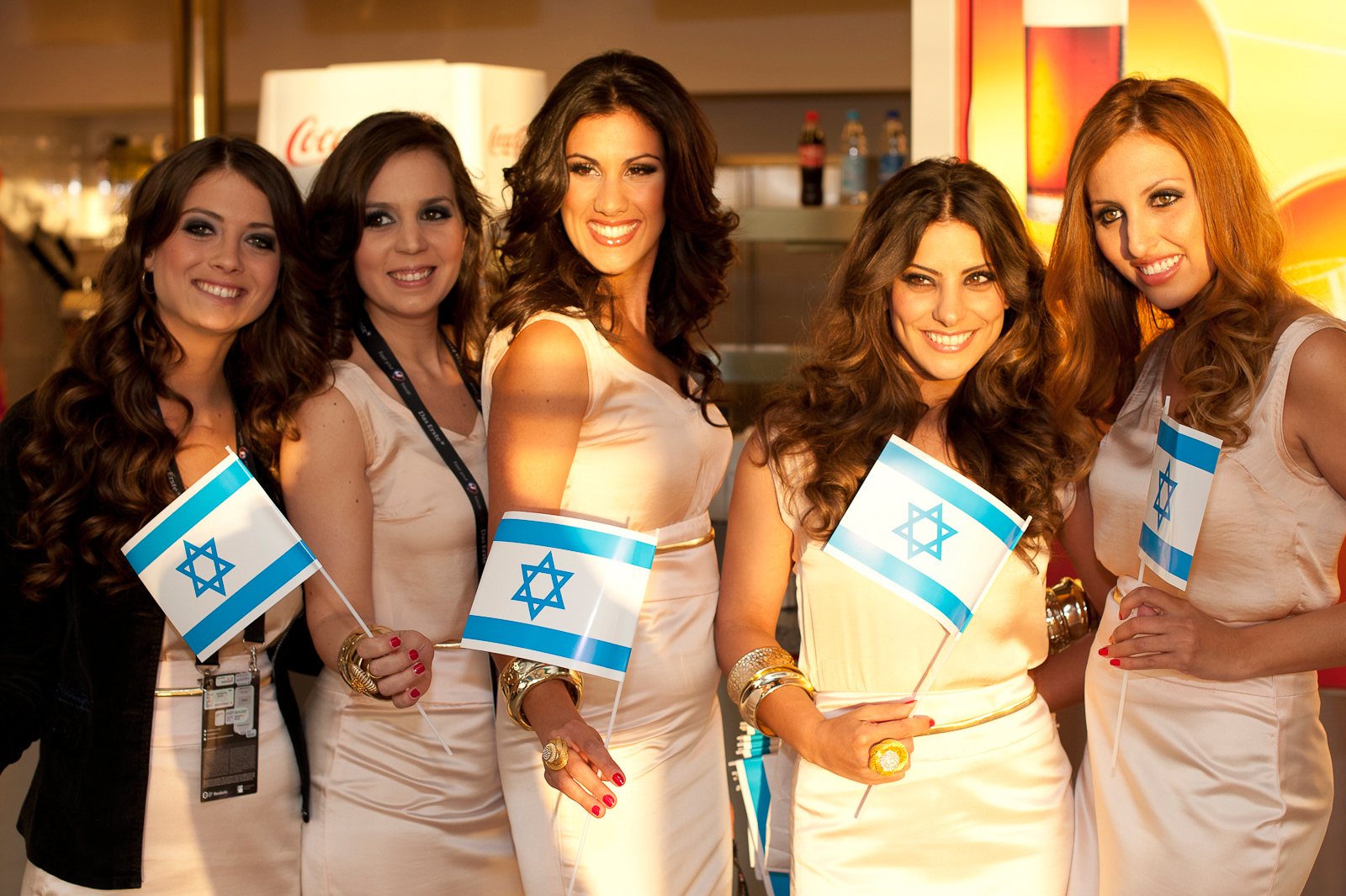
The five backing vocalists for Dana International attending an event for the contest in Düsseldorf

According to Eurovision rules, all nations with the exceptions of the host country and the "Big Five" (France, Germany, Italy, Spain and the United Kingdom) are required to qualify from one of two semi-finals in order to compete for the final; the top ten countries from each semi-final progress to the final. The European Broadcasting Union (EBU) split up the competing countries into six different pots based on voting patterns from previous contests, with countries with favourable voting histories put into the same pot. The EBU's Reference Group approved a request by the Israeli broadcaster for Israel to compete in the second semi-final on 12 May 2011 due to the date of the first semi-final, 10 May 2011, coinciding with the Yom Hazikaron memorial day. The running order for the semi-finals was decided through another draw on 15 March 2011 and Israel was set to perform in position 12, following the entry from Macedonia and before the entry from Slovenia.

In Israel, the two semi-finals and the final were televised live on IBA. The Israeli spokesperson, who announced the Israeli votes during the final, was Ofer Nachshon.

=== Semi-final ===
Dana International took part in technical rehearsals on 4 and 7 May, followed by dress rehearsals on 11 and 12 May. This included the jury show on 11 May where the professional juries of each country watched and voted on the competing entries.

The Israeli performance featured Dana International performing in a draped light green dress with a scale effect designed by French designer Jean Paul Gaultier who also designed one of her two dresses worn in the Eurovision Song Contest 1998, together with five female backing vocalists in white mid-length dresses standing in two rows on the left hand side of the stage. The LED screens on the stage displayed red and blue circles that pulsate and move around the screens. The performance was concluded with International walking down the stage's catwalk towards the audience.

At the end of the show, Israel was not announced among the top 10 entries in the second semi-final and therefore failed to qualify to compete in the final. It was later revealed that Israel placed fifteenth in the semi-final, receiving a total of 38 points.

=== Voting ===
Voting during the three shows involved each country awarding points from 1-8, 10 and 12 as determined by a combination of 50% national jury and 50% televoting. Each nation's jury consisted of five music industry professionals who are citizens of the country they represent. This jury judged each entry based on: vocal capacity; the stage performance; the song's composition and originality; and the overall impression by the act. In addition, no member of a national jury was permitted to be related in any way to any of the competing acts in such a way that they cannot vote impartially and independently.

Below is a breakdown of points awarded to Israel and awarded by Israel in the second semi-final and grand final of the contest. The nation awarded its 12 points to Sweden in the semi-final and the final of the contest.

==== Points awarded to Israel ====
Points awarded to Israel (Semi-final 2)
Score	Country
12 points	
10 points	
8 points	
7 points	France; Macedonia
6 points	Belarus
5 points	Netherlands; Sweden
4 points	Romania
3 points	
2 points	Belgium
1 point	Cyprus; Italy

==== Points awarded by Israel ====
Points awarded by Israel (Semi-final 2)
Score	Country
12 points	Sweden
10 points	Denmark
8 points	Ukraine
7 points	Romania
6 points	Slovenia
5 points	Estonia
4 points	Moldova
3 points	Macedonia
2 points	Belgium
1 point	Austria

Points awarded by Israel (Final)
Score	Country
12 points	Sweden
10 points	Denmark
8 points	Russia
7 points	Ukraine
6 points	Romania
5 points	Estonia
4 points	Azerbaijan
3 points	Slovenia
2 points	Georgia
1 point	United Kingdom
