= Nabil Salameh =

Palestinian musician (born 1962)

- Nabil Salameh

Background information
- Also known as: Nabil Bey
- Born: 6 January 1962 (age 64)
- Origin: Palestinian, born in Tripoli, Lebanon
- Genres: World music
- Occupations: Singer-songwriter, musician, journalist
- Instruments: Vocals, guitar, bouzouki, percussions
- Years active: 1988–present
- Label: Sony Music
- Website: http://www.radiodervish.com

Nabil Salameh, also known as Nabil or Nabil Bey (born 1962 in Tripoli, Lebanon), is a Palestinian-Italian singer, songwriter, musician, artist and journalist, founder of the world music bands Radiodervish and Al Darawish. Between 1998 and 2007 he worked as a foreign correspondent for the international network Al Jazeera, providing the western point of view relevant to international events, such as the September 11 attacks.

== Early life ==
Nabil Salameh was born in Tripoli in Lebanon, eighth of nine children, three males and six females, from Palestinian refugees. In 1948, fourteen years before his birth, following the establishment of the state of Israel his parents fled from Jaffa. In Lebanon Nabil's father was a UN officer and UNRWA supervisor of institutes for Palestinian refugees' education.

When in Lebanon, Nabil attended the Greek Orthodox college in the Christian district of Tripoli. To carry on his studies he firstly moved to Romania, where he enrolled in the University of Bucharest at the time of Nicolae Ceauşescu, eventually moving to Bari in Italy in 1983 to study Electrical Engineering at the local University.

== Career ==
=== Al Darawish ===
In 1988 Salameh founded the band in Bari (Apulia) the band: Al Darawish. The group invented a style of their own by playing several instruments coming from various areas of the Mediterranean region.

In 1990, Al Darawish took part in the Biennale des Jeunes Créateurs d'Europe et de la Méditerranée in Marseille. In 1991 they were selected and performed for the musical festival Arezzo Wave among other artists, then played at Carrefour de la Mediterranée in Thessaloniki in Greece.

In 1993, Al Darawish recorded their first album Al Darawish, which was presented live from the auditorium of the national network RAI Radiotelevisione Italiana on Radio3. In the same year Al Darawish were guests at the Babylon festival in Iraq.

In 1994, Nabil performed in Bari for the very first time with the Israeli singer Achinoam Nini aka Noa, with whom he has sung many times during his career.

In 1995, Al Darawish were guests at Musicultura for the sixth edition of Premio Città Recanati and to the acclaimed Concerto del Primo Maggio, a musical event held every year on Labour Day in Rome. In July 1995 the movie Trafitti da un raggio di sole was released, with Al Darawish signing the soundtrack and Nabil playing a part himself as an actor. In 1996, Al Darawish recorded their second album Radio Dervish.

=== Radiodervish ===
In 1997 Al Darawish disbanded. In the same year this was followed by the formation of the new band Radiodervish, by Nabil Salameh and Michele Lobaccaro, co-performer and co-founder of Al Darawish. Also in 1997 Nabil was asked to sing the anthem of the thirteenth edition of the Mediterranean Games, a multi-disciplinary sports event joined by athletes from the Mediterranean region: that year the games were held in Italy and Nabil was chosen as a Palestinian artist to perform for such event, for the very first time ever.

In 1998 Radiodervish recorded their first album Lingua contro lingua, published under the label I dischi del mulo and distributed by the multinational recording company Polygram: this work was awarded best record debut of the year by the Italian musical contest Piero Ciampi.

=== Jovanotti and Achinoam Nini ===
In November 1999, Nabil took part in Music for Peace, held in Paris, together with other international artists such as Gregory Peck, Sidney Poitier, Lionel Richie, Peter Ustinov, Zucchero.

At the end of the year, Nabil duetted with Jovanotti (born Lorenzo Cherubini) for the video recording of the latter's track Stella Cometa, and it was in that occasion that Jovanotti asked Nabil Salameh to render that song lyrics in Arabic and sing it. That is how Cherubini's single CD Dolce Fare Niente Remix turned out with three tracks, the first homonymous sung in Italian by Jovanotti, the second, Stella Cometa / Stella d'Oriente, as a duo by Cherubini/Salameh and the third Stella d'Oriente totally sung in Arabic by Nabil Salameh.

July 2000 brought to Nabil Salameh and the Israeli singer Achinoam Nini the recognition of honorary citizenship by the Mayor of Melpignano, who awarded the two artists for their continuous effort and commitment to build relationships between different cultures and for their effective activism for peace. In December of the same year, Nabil and Noa performed together on stage in a special concert for peace held in the Cathedral of Monreale and directed by Nicola Piovani with the Sicilian Symphonic Orchestra, for the United Nations convention against transnational organized crime, in presence of delegates from 189 nations.

The activity for peace of the two artists has been also appreciated by the association Accademia del Mediterraneo, which awarded them with Premio Mediterraneo arte 2001 for the usage of the universal language of music as a means to peace.

=== World touring ===
In March 2001 Nabil Salameh and Michele Lobaccaro presented a new musical project by Radiodervish, In Acustico, at La Vallisa in Bari, a church dating back to the tenth century now transformed in an auditorium. The project was meant to sustain the activities of the association Salaam ragazzi dell'olivo to support the children in the Palestinian refugee camp of Al Fawwar, in Hebron, West Bank. In June 2001, Salameh and Radiodervish are invited to perform in Beirut for the Fête de la Musique, held internationally on 21 June any year and in Lebanon for the very first time that year.

In 2002, Radiodervish was still touring with their project In Acustico. In January, Nabil and Radiodervish took part in the yearly concert held for Epiphany festivity, broadcast by RAI Rai 1 TV network: the theme of the show was peace in the Middle East and Nabil duetted again with Noa in the moving setting of Santa Chiara's monastery in Naples. For this occasion Radiodervish performed a national preview of the new single Centro del Mundo, which gave name to the following album by the band, released the next summer. Later that year in May, Radiodervish performed in the traditional Labour Day concert held in Brussels, which was dedicated to peace development in the Middle East. Later that same month, Nabil was again involved in another event by the same subject, Time for peace, held at the Colosseum in Rome and broadcast live worldwide. Here Nabil sang Centro del Mundo with Noa, with whom he also joined the peace walk Perugia-Assisi.

Radiodervish's album Centro del Mundo was released in June 2002, under the newborn label Cosmasola, and distributed by Il Manifesto CD. This new work was inspired by the changeableness and uprooting which influence the soul of human beings, and the music and tracks contained in the album tell the stories and feelings of people living between two cultures. Radiodervish were on tour all over Italy from August till the end of the year. In line with their personal social commitment, during this period they engaged in the Giubileo degli Oppressi, a series of events and meetings organized both by clerics and lay people aimed to find practical solutions against wars and to integrate people generally living in the fringe of society bearing no guilt, such as the needy, refugees, humans struck by conflicts, unemployed, homeless people. In September 2002 Nabil and Radiodervish performed at the second Summit of Mayors of the World for Peace, held in Athens, and in October they were guests at Premio Tenco, a musical contest organized every year in Italy.

Following an invitation by the University of Bari and the publisher Meridiana Editrice, in December 2002 Nabil Salameh and Michele Lobaccaro met and interviewed professor Arie Nadler, an Israeli sociologist, director of the Peres Centre for Peace in Tel Aviv, discussing the subject Building a peace memorial, that is to say how to develop a peaceful coexistence by sharing individual experience and memories.

=== Paris and Italy ===
On 26 and 27 March 2003 Nabil played with Radiodervish at the Olympia in Paris.

In August 2003 Nabil sang in the closing evening of the festival La Notte della Taranta, interpreting a traditional musical piece from Salento, arranged by the co-performer Stewart Copeland for that occasion.

In 2004 Radiodervish worked on a musical project inspired by the book Manteq aṭ-Ṭayr, The Conference of the Birds, by Farid al-Din Attar, a Persian poet, theoretician of Sufism. The project fed two artistic productions: the new album In search of Simurgh (Cosmasola / Il Manifesto), produced by Saro Cosentino and distributed also in the Asian market (Japan, China, Taiwan and Corea), and a play with the same name of the CD, woven with the work Ali di Polvere, written by the director and actress Teresa Ludovico, also performing on the stage with Radiodervish for this play, in which acting, poetry, music and lights melt together.

In 2006 Nabil and Radiodervish were on tour with another play, Amara Terra Mia, together with the actor Giuseppe Battiston. The show was a tribute to the Italian singer and songwriter Domenico Modugno: two of his best known songs, Amara Terra Mia and Tu si na cosa grande, were given a place of honour in this work, arranged here to be sung partly in Italian and Arabic. The play also produced an audio CD and a DVD, the former containing the audio recording of the live show, in which the songs of Radiodervish laid next to some texts recited by Battiston, in a tale of human beings on an eternal journey, moving among lands and cultures, between West and East, and the latter including the video clip of the song Amara Terra Mia, directed by the artist, singer and composer Franco Battiato. In 2007 Radiodervish released the album L'immagine di te (Radiofandango / Cosmasola) produced by Franco Battiato.

On 14 September Nabil Salameh became an Italian subject by an ordinance of the Republic of Italy.

=== 2008–2010 ===
In 2008 Nabil Salameh gave his voice to dub the character of the magpie Muezzin in the cartoon movie La luna nel deserto directed by Cosimo Damiano Damato. The soundtrack of this movie was also by Radiodervish. He is also the narrator in Terra Salata, a documentary produced by the association Mediterraid, which organizes a tour around the Mediterranean Sea every year with the aim of promoting relationship among people coming from the different countries of the area.

Also in 2008 Nabil contributed to the CD Il fiore splendente by Etta Scollo, a work on the Arab poets who lived in Sicily between the ninth and the twelfth centuries: the album, recorded in Berlin, was also presented at the concert hall of the Berliner Philharmoniker during a tour around Germany.

Between 2008 and 2009 Nabil and the Radiodervish were involved in more projects together with other artists. For the festival Divinamente Roma, with the participation of the actor Valter Malosti they set up the show Con le radici al cielo. In another show, accompanied by the live music of Radiodervish, the writer Carlo Lucarelli read some passages from his book L'ottava vibrazione, speaking about the experience of the Italian soldiers fighting against the Abyssinian army of Menelik in Ethiopia at the end of the nineteenth century.

In this period Nabil and Radiodervish organized and led a new cultural project, Le Porte dell'Occidente, held at the Norman-Swabian castle of Sannicandro di Bari, which became the permanent residence of numerous cultural events, from music performances to video screenings, from exhibitions to artistic workshops dedicated to schools, in which Radiodervish and other artists coming from different parts of the Mediterranean area involved themselves to promote cultural and artistic development as well as widen knowledge and consciousness of a common Mediterranean culture.

Following the experience of integration spent during Le Porte dell'Occidente, in May 2009 Nabil and Radiodervish went on a tour together with the Arab Orchestra of Nazareth, starting playing with them in Tel Aviv on the stage of the Tzavta theatre and then in Italy in June. During their next stay in Jerusalem, a very touching artistic and personal experience, they drew the inspiration for Beyond the Sea, the album released in October 2009 which was partially written there and completed in Apulia. This work, produced by Saro Cosentino, was enriched by sounds coming from Palestine and Israel, thanks to the contribution of artists such as the Arab Israeli Soloist of the Nazareth orchestra and Zohar Fresco.

In 2010 Radiodervish released the album Bandervish, including some of their songs and other pieces from the Middle Eastern musical tradition, such as Fogh el Nakhal and Lamma Badah.

=== 2011–2012 ===
In 2011 Salameh gave life to a project called Esperanto – Note di speranza: his aim was to collect funds to sustain the music schools in the West Bank. The first edition was held at Politeama Greco in Lecce with a concert played by Radiodervish, Paola Turci, Niccolò Fabio, Simone Cristicchi and Yo Yo Mundi.

In May 2011 Radiodervish were invited to play at the opening evening of the Literature Festival of Cairo with a concert given at Cairo Opera House.

Later in 2011 Salameh was on tour in Italy with Franco Battiato for the project Diwan, which recalled the Arab poetry mastering school raised in Sicily around 1000 a.c.

In the beginning of 2012 Nabil developed the education programme Lezioni di musica – Il mondo arabo del '900 attraverso la sua musica, a training path consisting in learning about the Arab world of the past century by looking through the eyes of its music. By introducing his course Salameh expressed awareness that art, to which music pertains, can speak volumes about a culture and its evolution, sometimes even more than a history book written by somebody with a story and a look of his own, whereas music is the voice of multiple human beings and comes from inside one's soul.

On 29 June 2012 the monthly magazine XL by La Repubblica, published the compilation Dal pesce alla Luna, a selection of songs by Radiodervish released during the past years of their career plus a new track, In fondo ai tuoi occhi, which will be included in the forthcoming album. The same compilation is also released on 30 October of the same year by Sony Music Entertainment and produced by Cosmasola: this second edition contains the version of Centro del Mundo sang with Noa.

=== 2013 and the new album by Radiodervish ===
On 5 February 2013, Radiodervish released the album Human. This new work is a collection of stories and thoughts driven from a time of profound crisis such as that occurred in the world during the last years. Economical recession, as well as loss of perception of the intimate human nature in an era that leaves no time left to self-inspection are seen as an opportunity to confront with the damage caused by hard times and to move forward with a brand new positive change.

== Discography – Al Darawish ==
- 1993 – Al Darawish
- 1996 – Radio Dervish

== Discography – Radiodervish ==
- 1998 – Lingua contro lingua
- 2001 – In acustico
- 2002 – Centro del Mundo
- 2004 – In search of Simurgh
- 2006 – Amara terra mia
- 2007 – L'immagine di te
- 2009 – Beyond the sea
- 2010 – Bandervish
- 2012 – Dal pesce alla Luna
- 2013 – Human

== Discography – collaborations ==
- 1999 – Stella cometa (Dolce far niente) – Jovanotti
- 2006 – Arte senza volto – Pippo Ark D'Ambrosio
- 2008 – Il fiore splendente – Etta Scollo

== Movies and soundtracks ==
- 1995 – Trafitti da un raggio di sole
- 2008 – La luna nel deserto

== Wikipedia related links ==
- Al Darawish
- Radiodervish (in Italian)
- Michele Lobaccaro (in Italian)
- Achinoam Nini
- Jovanotti
- Franco Battiato
- Farid al-Din Attar
- The Arab Orchestra of Nazareth
