= Al Darawish =

Italian band

Al Darawish was an Italian world music group formed in Bari in 1988.

The band members were from Apulia, Palestine and Greece and they had first met at the University of Bari while they were students. As they could all play at least an instrument, they decided to found a band in which their own talent, music skill and cultural background would merge in music and lyrics talking about stories and experiences of people coming from their places of origin. As a matter of fact Al Darawish means "simple people" in Arabic and their lyrics were generally written in Arabic and in Italian, but also in Greek, French, Spanish, English and even Latin.

They were one of the first successful experiences of world music in Italy and received great approval from the public. By playing both traditional and modern electrical instruments they gave life to a style of their own which could be defined as "Mediterranean ethno-rock". They also contributed to carry on and feed a school in Southern Italy which uses multi-ethnic and traditional music to give voice to human and social events related to people living in the Mediterranean region.

Al Darawish recorded their first homonymous album Al Darawish in 1993, followed by Radio Dervish in 1996.

In 1997 Al Darawish split up, part of them founding the group Radiodervish and others the band X-Darawish.

== Performances ==
During their career the band took part in more than 500 concerts, the most important of which for them were:

- Biennale des Jeunes Créateurs d'Europe et de la Méditerranée in Marseille - 1990
- Arezzo Wave in Arezzo - 1991
- Carrefour de la Mediterranée in Thessaloniki - 1991
- Babylon festival in Iraq - 1993
- Festival del Cinema di Venezia in Venice - 1994
- Musicultura for the sixth edition of Premio Città Recanati in Recanati - 1995
- Concerto del Primo Maggio, on Labour Day in Rome – 1995

They also were guests at TV and radio networks of national relevance, such as RAI Radiotelevisione Italiana, Telemontecarlo and Videomusic.

== Formation ==
- Nabil Salameh - vocals, twelve-string guitar, bouzouki, percussions
- Michele Lobaccaro - vocals, bass guitar, çifteli, claves
- Enzo Leone - electric and classical guitar
- Stratos Diamantis - accordion, vocals (in Greek), bendir
- Paolo Mastromarco - violin, classical guitar
- Rocco Draicchio - darbuka, riq, congas, timbales, rototom, bendir, bongos, sleigh bells, shaker
- Angelo Pantaleo – drums, flute, clarinet, keyboards, twelve-string guitar, percussions, folk guitar, bouzouki, 2nd accordion

Guest musicians:

- Franco Bernardi – keyboards
- Alessandro Pipino - keyboards

== Discography ==
- 1993 - Al Darawish
- 1996 - Radio Dervish

== Movies and soundtracks ==
In 1995 Al Darawish composed the soundtrack to Trafitti da un raggio di sole, a movie in which some of them also took part as actors.
