= Hind Laroussi =

Dutch singer

Hind Laroussi هند العروسي
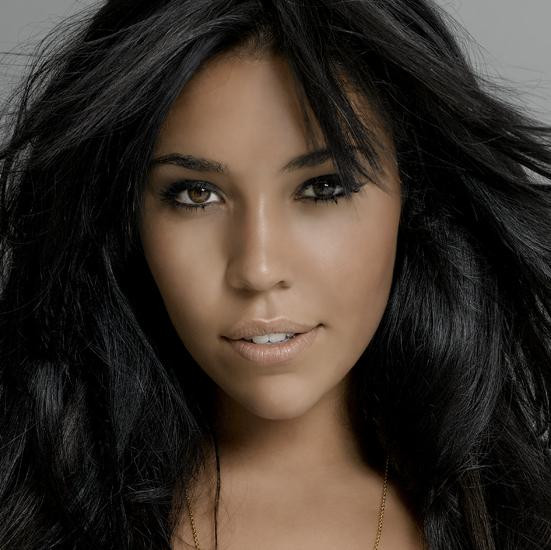

Background information
- Born: Hind Laroussi Tahiri; 3 December 1984 (age 41)
- Origin: Gouda, Netherlands
- Genre: Founder of Cross-pop
- Occupation: Singer
- Years active: 2003–present
- Label: B-Hind
- Website: hind.nl

Hind Laroussi Tahiri (Arabic: هند العروسي born 3 December 1984), known professionally as Laroussi and formerly as Hind, is a Dutch singer of Moroccan descent.

== Biography ==
Hind Laroussi Tahiri was born on 3 December 1984 in Gouda, Netherlands. She has a Moroccan father and a Dutch mother.

When Hind was eight years she sang and acted in public for the first time. Shortly thereafter she started taking singing lessons. At her high school she performed in numerous music shows. Her talent did not go unnoticed; she received an invitation to sing during the TMF dancemasters party of the year in (Germany). All this resulted in a role in Tracks, a contemporary theatre group. Singing, dancing and cabaret lessons followed. At national level Hind came to the fore when she participated in the Soundmixshow 2002, and took part in the finals, where she imitated Vanessa Williams. Hind also took part in the first edition of the talent show Idols in 2003, finishing in third place. She also performed with the Arab Orchestra of Nazareth from Israel.

Hind, who sings R&B, pop and fado, is not afraid to experiment with different musical styles in different languages such as Arabic and Portuguese. One of her ambitions is to star in a major role in a musical. While her Idols colleagues Jim Bakkum and Jamai Loman stormed the charts with their singles, Hind kept quiet, preparing her debut album, Around the World. The first single, "Summer All Over Again", was released in September 2003 and became a success. The subsequent singles Weak and Sure As were not as successful. In 2004 the singer received an Edison for her debut album and on 25 October the same year she sang the song "A Felicidade" at a concert by Danny Malando in Tuschinski. In September 2005, her second album, Halfway Home. came out. The first single. "Give Me A Sign" was a moderate success, but the singles that followed ("Halfway Home" and "Habaytek Besaif2) were not as successful. Recently it was announced that Hind's deal with record label SONY & BMG had ceased, apparently due to poor sales. Hind has, however, found a new record label to accommodate her music: PIAS

== Musical career ==
Hind participated in the first edition of the Dutch Idols in the season 2002–2003, where she reached the finals, finishing in third place.

Her debut album Around The World (2003) contains pop and R&B songs, but is also influenced by Portuguese and Arabic music. The album sold over 40,000 copies. In 2004, she received an Edison award for Best New Dutch Artist. In 2005, Hind released her second album Halfway Home, which she herself called "Arabpop" due to the Arabic influences in several of the songs. The single "Habbaytek Besaif" (2006) is a Fairuz cover.

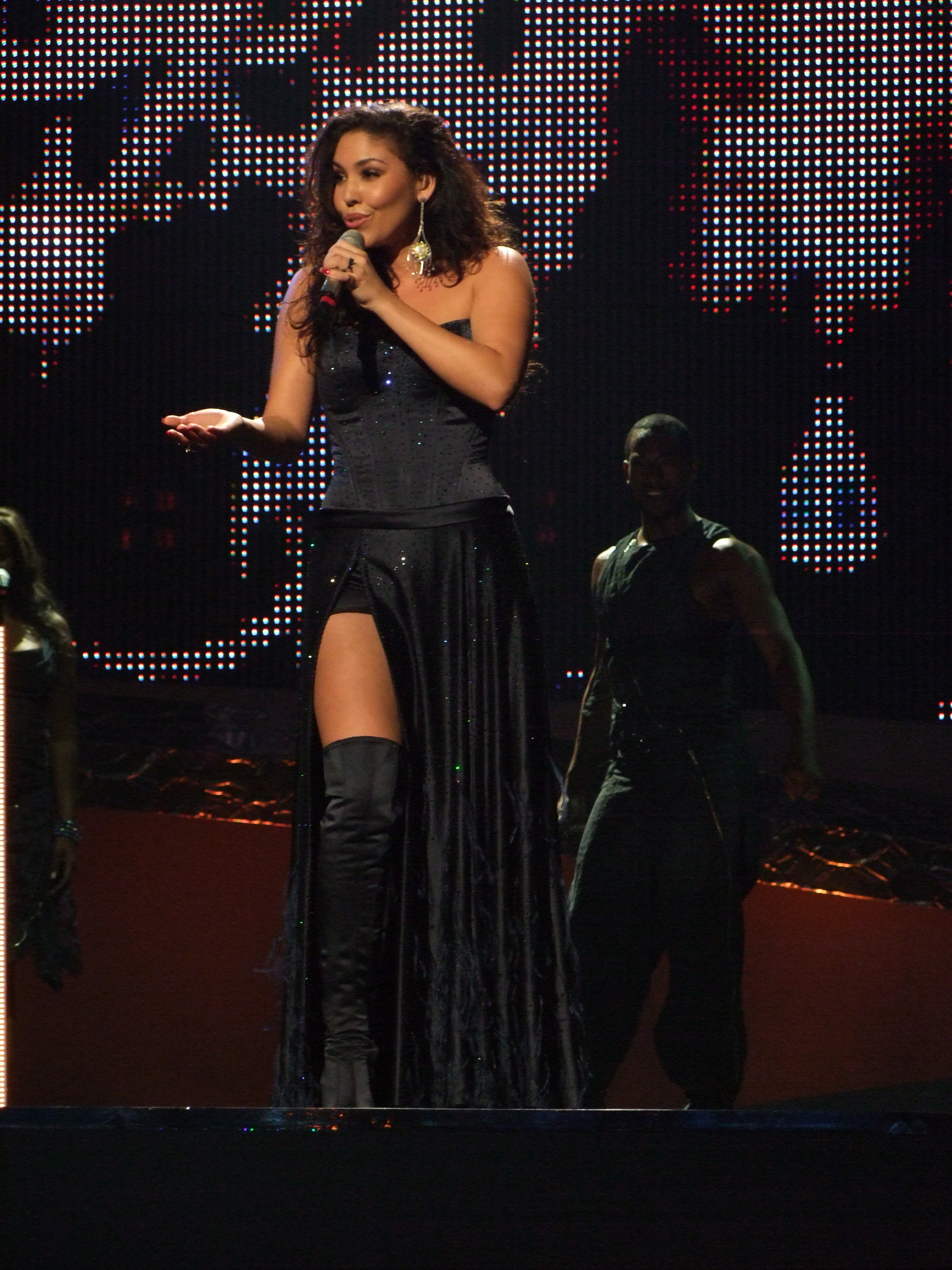
Hind performing at the Eurovision Song Contest 2008.

Hind represented the Netherlands in the Eurovision Song Contest 2008 in Serbia with the song "Your Heart Belongs to Me". However, she failed to make it past the semi-final stage.

On 23 November 2009 Hind started to raise €40,000 for her next CD on Sellaband. The believers funded the sum in just 11 days. On 8 December 2009 the second phase started, collecting €24,000 for promotion. This target was reached on 11 January 2011. Finally it was announced, Hind will collect an additional €30,000 to produce three videos. The third phase never started. Hind announced her new album Crosspop on 4 October 2010 in "De Melkweg" in Amsterdam.

On Saturday 16 October 2010 the new album broke at number 8 in the Dutch album top 100, the highest ranking yet of any of her albums. Her debut album entered the charts at number 9 after all of the exposure of Idols. Hind Crosspop was produced by the legendary Steve Power. Together with her boyfriend and manager Eddie Tjon Fo she released the album as an independent label. There were good reviews and even the direct attention of the German Livedome.de group that took the exclusive rights to broadcast the CD release party from the Melkweg (Amsterdam) with around 900 people present. Livedome broadcast the show live on 13 October as a live stream through 36 portals, creating much exposure and compliments for Hind as a singer as well as for her interesting new music style Crosspop.

== Discography ==
=== Singles ===
Year	Single	Album	Peak positions	
Year	Single	Album	Dutch Top 40	Dutch Top 100
2003	"Summer All Over Again"	Around The World	11	7
2004	"Weak"	Around The World	31	22
2004	"Sure As"	Around The World	–	35
2005	"Give Me A Sign"	Halfway Home	29	15
2005	"Halfway Home"	Halfway Home	–	75
2006	"Habaytek Besaif"	Halfway Home	–	–
2008	"Your Heart Belongs to Me"	Eurovision Song Contest 2008	27	16
2009	"Morgen"	SpangaS op Survival Soundtrack	–	17
2011	"Wereldwijd orkest"		–	1
2013	"Make it Count"		–	11

=== Albums ===
- Around The World (2003)
- Halfway Home (2005)
- Crosspop (2010)

== Miscellaneous ==
On 29 August 2009 Hind performed for the satirical program Let's Dance on Dutch network RTL 4 where she had her own nipple-gate. During her dance the dress she wore dropped and revealed her left breast. Hind was aware of the happening but hoped no-one saw it. When she looked back at the footage she was shocked as she never intended to pose nude she stated to the De Telegraaf newspaper.

Awards and achievements
Preceded by Edsilia Rombley with "On Top of the World"	Netherlands in the Eurovision Song Contest; 2008	Succeeded by De Toppers with "Shine"
