= KNOB (duo) =

Israeli musical duo

KNOB נוב
- Also known as: Runnerz
- Origin: Israel
- Genres: Dance, electropop
- Years active: 2006-present
- Labels: TETA; Champion Records (distribution)
- Members: Niv Cohen (producer, vocals); Meital Patash-Cohen (songwriting, lead vocals); Dvir André Tzanua (songwriting)
- Website: http://www.knob.co.il/

KNOB (Hebrew: נוב; stylized as knob) is an Israeli music duo formed in 2006, that has become a famous dance music act on Israeli dance floors and popular on Israeli radio stations. KNOB is made up of Niv Cohen and Meital Patash-Cohen. The two also do songwriting, with help from Dvir André Tzanua, and the production of the materials. Champion Records, UK's largest indie label, has distributed the band's biggest international commercial success "I'm Lost".

After success of "I'm Lost", the dance record label "TETA: Making Music" signed KNOB for a 3-album contract. With TETA, KNOB released further singles followed by a debut self-titled album knob released in May 2008. Champion Records distributed the album in Europe and North America.

== Style ==
Niv Cohen of KNOB was active in music being the owner of the Garage Music Studio in Tel Aviv and is the producer of the band. Meital Patash-Cohen, Niv's wife, does the vocals, with Niv joining her in singing at times. Meital also writes and composes the music of the band.

Their music includes upbeat electropop songs, house music productions and vocals. Rather than just mixing tunes, knob uses in its live acts stage musicians, percussionists, electric and bass guitars players. Niv plays the synthesizer and joins Meital in some of the renditions.

== Kdam Eurovision 2011 ==
In 2011, the band took part in Kdam Eurovision with the bilingual English/Hebrew song "אוהב את זה (I'm Loving It)" (Hebrew title pronounced as "Ohev et ze") in a bid to represent Israel in the Eurovision Song Contest in Düsseldorf, Germany. KNOB finished in 8th place in between 10 acts to the Kdam competition. Dana International went on to win the nomination with "Ding Dong".

== Discography ==
Albums

- 2008: knob

Track listing:

1. I'm Lost
2. Only You
3. Music
4. Don't Tell Me
5. Coincidence
6. On My Own
7. No More
8. X-press Yourself
9. Not About You
10. Sorry
11. Call Me
12. Sometimes
13. Sad Song
- 2010: Let Love Rule

Track listing:

1. Save Me
2. Let Love Rule
3. Make U Love Me
4. Alive
5. Rock Your World
6. Pop Like That (feat. Ortal)
7. Don’t Tell Me (Niv Cohen Rmx)
8. Music (Niv Cohen Rmx)
9. No More (Niv Cohen Rmx)
10. Enjoy the Silence

Singles

- 2008: "I'm Lost"
- 2011: "Ohev et ze (I'm Loving It") (for Kdam Eurovision 2011)
- 2011: "Pop Like That" (feat. Ortal)

Songs

- 2010: "Memories" (released as a single by Electronic producer N Pa, was released on his second studio album on September 24, 2013 and re-released on December 9, 2013 as an EP)
- 2011: "No More (remix)" (released on the compilation album Voice of the Street - Dance Floor)
- 2011: "If You Ever Fall in Love Again (released on the compilation album The Voice of the Street - Dance Floor 2)
