= Harel Skaat =

Israeli singer (born 1981)

- הראל סקעת
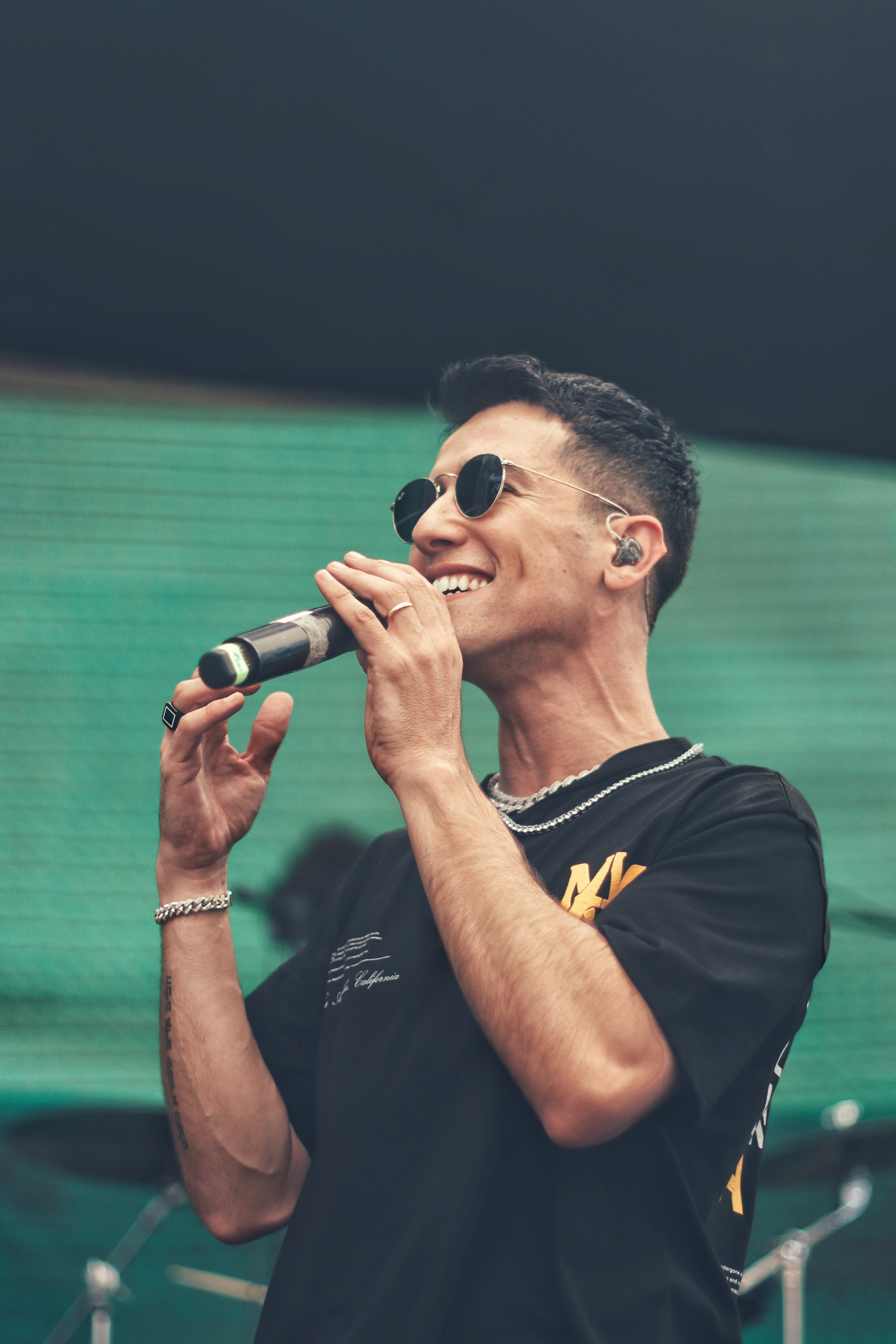
- Harel Skaat singing at the 2022 Haifa Pride
- Born: 8 August 1981 (age 45); Kfar Saba, Israel
- Occupations: Singer, Performer, Songwriter
- Years active: 2004–Present
- Spouse: Idan Roll (m. 2021)
- Children: 2
- Musical career
- Genre: Pop
- Labels: Hed Arzi Music; Aroma Music

Harel Skaat (Hebrew: הראל סקעת; born 8 August 1981) sometimes known by the mononym Harel is an Israeli singer and songwriter. He represented Israel in the Eurovision Song Contest 2010 with the song "Milim" ("מילים", "Words").

Skaat has been singing and performing in public since he was a child. At the age of six, he won a children's song festival competition. While still in elementary school he appeared on national television and as a teenager, he was the lead singer for both his city's and high school's bands. During his mandatory duty with the Israel Defense Forces, he sang in the Communication Corps Band. Skaat's professional breakthrough came when he was a contestant on the second season of Kochav Nolad ("כוכב נולד", "A Star is Born"), a reality competition television show similar in format to American Idol, and finished in second place. After the show ended, he signed a recording contract with Hed Arzi, one of the largest music companies in Israel.

His debut album, the self-titled Harel Skaat, was released in July 2006. It produced five hit singles, including the romantic ballad, "Ve'at" ("ואת", "And You"), which was the number one song of the year on both of the major Israeli year-end Hebrew song charts. The album has been certified platinum in Israel. He followed up the album with a concert tour, which surpassed 200 concert shows, a milestone in Israeli music.

In early 2008, Skaat and Hed Arzi became embroiled in a year-long legal dispute. Shortly after the dispute was resolved, he entered into a new agreement with Aroma Music and Partner Communications and recorded his second album entitled Dmuyot (דמויות, Figures). The album was released in September 2009 and has been certified gold in Israel.

Generally classified in the media as a pop singer, Skaat has been influenced by a wide variety of music, and his albums have featured an eclectic mix of songs, from rock to romantic ballads. His singing and performing talents have been widely praised by critics and Israeli music industry professionals, but his albums have received only mixed reviews. All of the songs on his official albums and EP have been sung in Hebrew, but Skaat has occasionally sung in English and French in live concerts. In December 2009, the Israel Broadcasting Authority selected Skaat internally to be Israel's representative for the Eurovision Song Contest 2010. The contest was held in Oslo, Norway, in late May 2010 and Israel placed 14th out of 39 entries.

== Early life and education ==
Harel Skaat was born on 8 August 1981, in Kfar Saba, Israel, to a family of Yemenite-Jewish and Iraqi-Jewish descent. When he was six years old, he won a national children's festival competition entitled "A Star for the Evening – Singing Big" in his hometown and while still a child he appeared in an episode of a popular Israeli television show called Parpar Nehmad (פרפר נחמד, Nice Butterfly). Throughout his youth, he continued to appear at festivals and television shows, and at the age of 15 he was the lead singer of both the Kfar Saba city band and his high school band. At 18, he sang with the Israel Defense Forces' Communications Corps. Band, where he met and became friends with singer-songwriter, Dor Daniel. He attended Beit Zvi, a college specializing in the performing arts, where he was awarded two of the university's most prestigious scholarships for his performances in school-produced musicals, including the outstanding achievement scholarship and the Sano Scholarship. While still in college, Skaat recorded and released a single, "Ein od Si'kui" ("אין עוד סיכוי", "No More Chance"); around the same time, he competed in a televised talent show called Ha'melech Ha'ba (המלך הבא, The Next King) along with Ninet Tayeb, (who later gained fame by winning the first season of Kokhav Nolad). Rafael Mirila won the competition, while Tayeb finished third and Skaat finished in sixth place.

== Career ==
=== Kokhav Nolad ===
In 2005, during his second year of studies at Beit Zvi, Skaat became a contestant on Kokhav Nolad after a friend signed him up without his knowledge. He emerged as the favorite, consistently receiving praise from the show's judges for his performances, which included his rendition of "Betoch" ("בתוך", "Inside") and the Hebrew version of the French song "Je suis malade" known as "Bdidut", ("בדידות", "Loneliness"), which he sang in the semi-finals (Ricky Gal, one of the judges on the show, said of the latter performance that it left her "almost speechless"). On his way to the finals, Skaat received the highest votes of each stage he competed, including the semi-final round where he defeated his competitors, including eventual winner, Harel Moyal by a wide margin. The final show generated huge viewer interest in Israel. At the finals, Skaat sang the song "Hinenny Can" (Hebrew: הנני כאן, "Jerusalem, Here I Am") which was originally performed by Yehoram Gaon in the 1971 movie "Any Yerushalmy" (Hebrew: אני ירושלמי, "I Am a Jerusalemite"). This version of the song went on to top the Israeli Music Channel's chart for a record-setting 80 days. Moyal's surprise win "sparked heated debate in the general public in Israel" and spurred accusations of voter manipulation by some of Skaat's fans. The allegations, which were denied by the producers of the television program, arose in part from perceived problems inherent in the voting system, which allowed for block voting and from online betting taking place before the finals.

=== After Kokhav Nolad ===
Both Skaat and Moyal emerged from Kokhav Nolad. A large part of Skaat's fan base has consisted of Israel's youth. He won the "Singer of the Year" from the Children's Channel three times from 2005 to 2007 and in 2007, 2008, and 2010 he was ranked number one out of Israel's Top 100 Stars by the youth magazine, Maariv Lanoar. In the period between his appearance on Kokhav Nolad and the release of his first album in 2006, Skaat appeared dozens of times on Israeli television talk shows, and at televised special ceremonies and holiday events. In 2005, Skaat sang in front of an estimated 80,000 people at Rabin Square, Tel Aviv at the memorial rally for former prime minister, Yitzhak Rabin on the tenth anniversary of his assassination. He continues to be a popular singer at holiday events, performing for example, in five different cities on Israel's Yom Ha'atzmaut (יום העצמאות, Independence Day) 2010. He has also taken part in several Festigal children song festivals, which occur annually during the Hanukkah season. At the 2004 Festigal, Skaat competed in a song contest, playing the part of Peter Pan (a character which he told an interviewer that he identified with) and sang the song "Lauf" ("לעוף", "To Fly"). He again finished second to Moyal, who won the contest with the song "I Am Zorro" ("אני הוא זורו"); Ran Danker finished third.

In 2005, Skaat performed in a musical play, He Who Dreamed (English translation), based on the last 10 years of the life of Yitzhak Rabin. The cast also included Gila Almagor and Oded Teomi in the title role. In early 2006, Skaat was featured in a unique series of three-minute reality-based segments produced by Cellcom, which was made available for download to its customers, among the first content of this kind in Israel's history.

=== Debut album: Harel Skaat ===
Skaat released his debut album, Harel Skaat (הראל סקעת), in July 2006. Reviews of the album were mixed. A review in The Jerusalem Post criticized the lack of spontaneity of the album, and the inclusion of dance tracks which the critic claimed undercut the singer's talents, but praised Skaat's soothing vocals and his ability to move listeners. In a review of the album for Ynet, Roman Singer compared Skaat to a cultured rose without the thorns. Another review claimed that Skaat was "trapped" singing "romantic stories", but praised his warm singing of "Ve'at", and his singing talents which the writer claimed allows him to "express at higher levels".

Harel Skaat produced a string of "chart-leading hits", including "Kama Od Efshar" ("כמה עוד אפשר", "How Much More is Possible"), "Mashehu Mimeni" ("משהו ממני", "Something from Me"), "Kol Hatziporim" ("כל הציפורים", "All the Birds"), "Im Hu Yelech" ("אם הוא ילך", "If He Goes"), and the award-winning, romantic ballad, "Ve'at" ("ואת", "And You"), which stayed number one on the major Israeli music charts for seven weeks and finished as the number one song of the year on the Reshet Gimmel's and Galgalatz's year-end music charts for 2006, and also on the BBC Israeli regional radio annual poll for 2006 ("Mashehu Mimeni" and "Kama Od Efshar" finished fourth and tenth respectively on the same poll). Skaat was named "Male Singer of 2006" by both Reshet Gimmel and Galgalatz. He also won "Singer of the Year" and "Song of the Year" for "Ve'at" in the Music 24 Channel's Israel Music Awards (AMI). In addition, "Im Hu Yelech" was named the best music video of the year by the Israeli Music Channel.

Produced by veteran record producer, Izhar Ashdot, the album was certified gold less than one month after its release and eventually achieved platinum status. (Because of its small market size, the Israeli music industry certifies an album to be gold when it sells 20,000 copies.) The album's commercial success was not only important to Skaat's burgeoning career, but it also proved helpful in launching the careers of three young singer-songwriters, Keren Peles, Dor Daniel, and Kfir Epstein, who each wrote hit songs on the album, and went on to release successful debut albums of their own. Skaat co-wrote one song on the album, "Afilu Shesreifot" ("אפילו שהשריפות", "Even Though it's Burning").

=== Second album: Dmuyot ===
In early 2008, Hed Artzi sued Skaat for breach of contract, claiming that he had secretly recorded new material for a new CD for a rival company before their contract had expired, and demanding all the recordings Skaat might have made in secret. In court, Skaat denied that he had broken their contract, but Hed Artzi won a temporary injunction against Skaat, which kept the singer from recording any new material. A resolution seemed possible in December 2008 when the Israel Broadcasting Authority (IBA) selected Skaat to be the country's representative in the Eurovision Song Contest 2009. Skaat and Hed Artzi renewed their negotiations to resolve the conflict but when these broke down, the record company contested the IBA's selection, which forced Skaat to drop out. In February 2009, the Tel Aviv District Court permitted Skaat to return to the studio. (The IBA eventually selected Achinoam Nini and Mira Awad to represent Israel with the song "There Must be Another Way", and they finished 16th in the contest.) The two parties subsequently reached a compromise and Skaat soon entered into a new agreement with Aroma Music and Partner Communications. Skaat's second album, Dmuyot (דמויות, Figures [alternative translations of the title include "Images" and "Characters"]) was released on 1 September 2009. The album contained the hit song "Muvan Li Achshav" ("מובן לי עכשיו", "Now I Understand"), which was released as a single and sold exclusively in Israel at Aroma Espresso Bar's chain of coffee shops. Other singles from the album include "Boi Ha Yom" ("בואי היום", "Come Today"), "Sof", ("סוף", "End") and "Od Ya'ir Alay" ("עוד יאיר עלי", "Shine on Me"). The majority of the album was produced by either Peter Roth or Izhar Ashdot, with a number of young Israeli songwriters contributing songs to it, including Ofer Bashan, Yali Sobol, Ben-Artzi, Sheila Ferber, Kfir Epstein, Didi Shachar, Ilai Botner, and Yoav Degani. Skaat co-wrote four of the songs on the album ("Sof", "Od Ya'ir Alay", "Dmuyot", and "Zippor" ("ציפור", "Bird")), including two which were released as singles.

Although it has been certified gold in Israel, Dmuyot did not achieve the same level of commercial success as his first album. The album's biggest hit, "Muvan Li Achshav" placed number 34 on the Reshet Gimmel annual music chart for 2009. Critically, the reviews of the album were mixed. For example, a review by Yossi Hersonski praised the "beautiful melody" of "Sof" but found the lyrics to be overly-sentimental. In contrast, Hersonski wrote that "Dmuyot", the closing song on the album was a monologue by Skaat with "his soul, confessing his weaknesses", and that Skeat's singing "is very emotional, but more polished this time"

=== Eurovision 2010 ===
"Milim" ("Words")
Harel Skaat represented Israel with the song "Milim" ("מילים", "Words") at the Eurovision Song Contest 2010. "Milim" features the prominent use of orchestral instruments, as can be heard on this sample of the song from the Eurovision 2010 CD. Skaat recorded a newer version of the song before the Eurovision Contest, with a new vocal arrangement and with the addition of a full orchestra.

In December 2009, the Israel Broadcasting Authority selected Skaat to represent Israel in the Eurovision Song Contest 2010. The announcement was made at the Knesset, Israel's legislative body. The selection was preceded by several days of speculation and confusion, and followed by criticism of the Israel Broadcasting Authority and calls for an investigation of the selection process. On 15 March 2010, "Milim" ("מילים", "Words") written by Noam Horev and composed by Tomer Hadadi, was selected unanimously as the Israeli song entry for the Eurovision contest when it won the Kdam Eurovision, the country's pre-Eurovision selection competition. The four songs chosen as finalists for the Kdam Eurovision, including "Milim", were recorded in a studio by Skaat and released on a special EP entitled Eurovision 2010 At the Kdam Eurovision, Skaat sang "Milim" in Hebrew with the backing of string instruments, but before the Eurovision contest, Skaat re-recorded it entirely in Hebrew but with an altered vocal arrangement and with a full orchestra accompaniment. Because it was known by early March 2010 that the majority of Eurovision entries for that year would probably be sung in English (24 of the 39 entries at the Eurovision contest sang in English), there was some coverage in the Israeli media before Eurovision as to which language "Milim" should be sung—Hebrew, English, French, or in some combination of the languages.

Ultimately, Skaat sang the song in both the semi-finals (where he passed) and finals of Eurovision entirely in Hebrew, performing the altered version with the full orchestra accompaniment (although at Eurovision 2010, there was no live orchestra present, which meant that he sang with the backing of a recorded track). To promote the Israeli entry, a music video of "Milim" was released and Skaat also recorded and released English and French versions of the song.

At Oslo, Skaat explained to the press that "Milim" is about loss, such as in a breakup, but that for him, it has a deeper meaning. Skaat said, "This song touches me deeply. My grandfather died just days before the elections in Israel, and this gives me a very deep feeling, I feel that I'm singing this song for him. He wanted me to participate in the Eurovision Song Contest for five years, and then he got to hear that I would take part in the national selection before he passed away."

Despite being listed as one of the favorites to win on several online betting sites, Israel placed only 14th in the Eurovision contest's 50/50-result. Detailed analysis shows a wide difference between the overall voting of the viewers and the juries, both of whom had equal weight in determining the results of the finals. Israel placed fifth out of the 25 entries in the finals with the juries, but only 19th with the televoters. Had it been up to the public, Israel would not have made it past the semi-final rounds, placing 12th in a field of 17 with televoters in the second semi-final; Skaat's strong placement with the juries in the second semi-finals secured Israel's place in the finals. Despite the disappointing results, Israel received something of a consolation prize, as the country swept the Eurovision-sanctioned 2010 Marcel Bezençon Awards, winning for best artist, best composition, and best entry of the contest. It is the first time in the history of the awards, which are selected by the contest's accredited media and press, participating composers, and commentators that a single country has won more than one award in the same year. At the end of the Eurovision contest, Skaat expressed pride and gratitude. He told one reporter, "I’m proud and happy over the performance and for representing [Israel]. We brought Israel artistic accolades. It was a fun experience and I enjoyed every minute of it. After all, it’s just sports". While Christer Björkman, a founder of the Marcel Bezençon Awards, stated, "The awards given to the Israeli entry show a virtue of the prize. It reveals something that didn't come across in the vote of the contest... This song is very beautiful, and we've been here two weeks now, but it might be that this song doesn't reach out, in the same way, the first time you hear it".

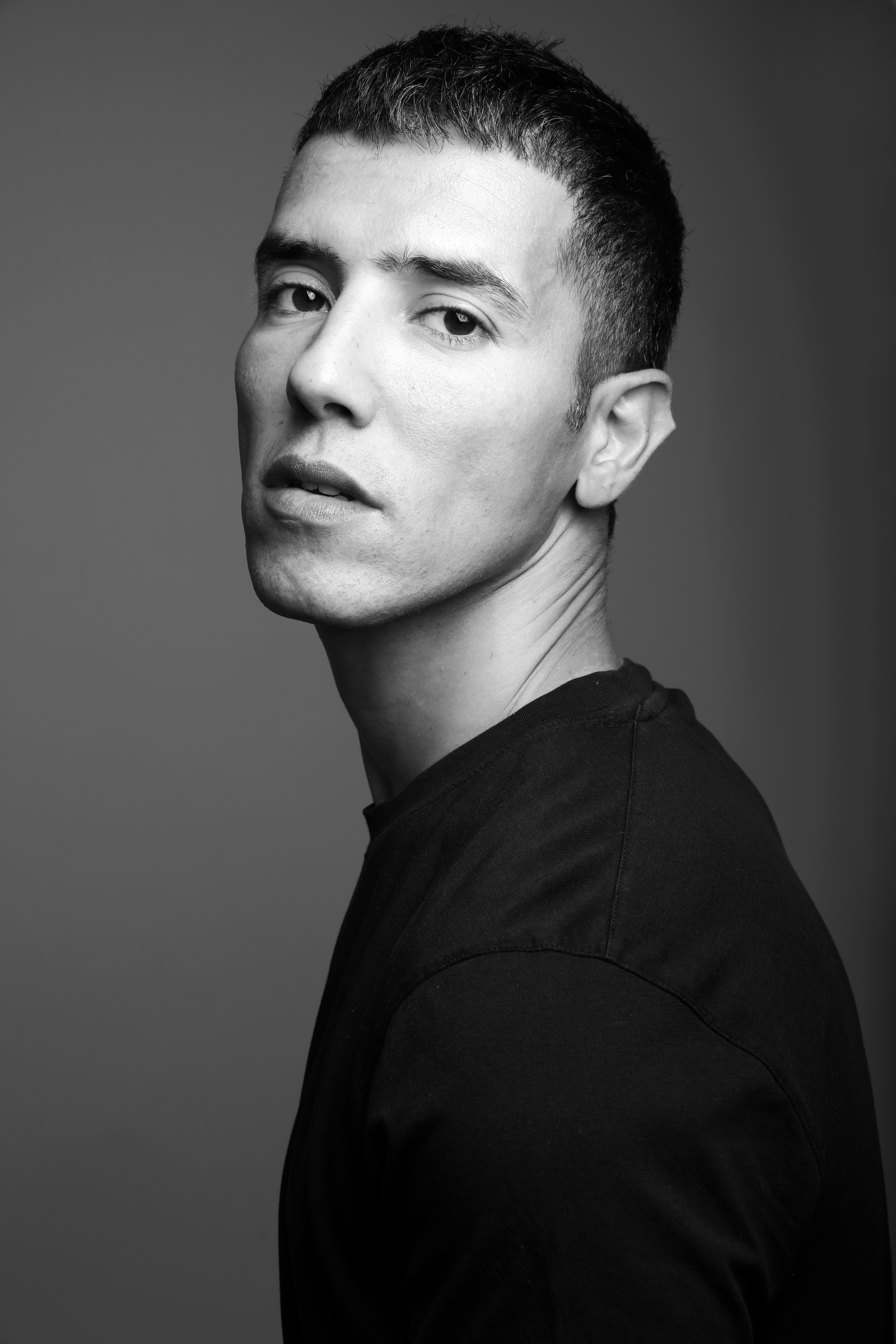
Harel Skaat in 2019

=== Third album: Shuv Me'ushar ===
Skaat's third album, Shuv Me'ushar (שוב מאושר, "Happy Again"), produced by Ran Shem Tov, was released on 29 January 2012. Two singles from the album, Tihye Li Ahava (תהיה לי אהבה, "I Will Have Love") and HaMea Ha-21 ("21st Century"), reached number one on the radio charts in Israel. Among the other songs on the album is the single, Kama Od Drachim (כמה עוד דרכים, "How Many More Ways"), "Mashehu Tov" (משהו טוב, "Something Good") and Gibor (גיבור, "Hero"), a duet with Yehuda Poliker. The album was Skaat's first since he came out as gay a few months earlier and started dating a male fashion model. A review of the album published in NRG Ma'ariv found that despite the big changes in Skaat's life, he still sounded restrained. Three of the songs from the album finished in the Reshet Gimmel's year-end poll of top songs from the previous year (announced on 15 September 2012). The songs are "Kama Od Drachim" (#7), "HaMea Ha-21" (#9), and "Mashehu Tov" (#11). Skaat also was named male singer of the year.

== Concerts & Stage Performances ==
In 2006, Skaat began a concert tour to promote his debut album, performing throughout Israel, including a concert at the Frederic R. Mann Auditorium in Tel Aviv (home to the Israel Philharmonic Orchestra). The tour eventually passed the 200 concert mark, an achievement which has been widely noted in the Israeli media. In 2009 Skaat began a second concert tour to promote the Dmuyot album. Reuters' music writer and critic, Assaf Nevo began his review of the launch of that tour by noting that if a computer were to create the ultimate Israeli pop singer it would resemble Skaat, who he wrote combined the charisma of Shlomo Artzi, the star quality of Ivri Lider, the vocal clarity of Izhar Cohen, the cuteness of Evitar Banai, and the sensitivity of Rami Kleinstein. While Nevo viewed Skaat as a good pop singer, he believed that Skaat's music did not extend beyond this genre.

Skaat has also frequently appeared at the Zappa nightclubs in Tel Aviv and Herzliya, which regularly features live music from both Israeli and international musicians.

One of Skaat's first major appearances after Eurovision was on 28 July 2010 in Tel Aviv at a tribute to the French singer, Serge Gainsbourg. Skaat had been scheduled to perform at the opening ceremony of the XIX International Festival of Arts, "Slavianski Bazaar in Vitebsk" in Belarus on 9 July 2010, but his appearance was canceled by the organizers two days before the event. The organizers cited a need to downsize the number of concerts as a reason for the cancellation, but Israeli diplomatic sources alleged that the cancellation was due to political reasons and the Israeli ambassador to Belarus refused to attend the opening ceremony in protest. In March 2011, Skaat took part in a unique collaboration: singing three of his songs live in Sharon Levi's Barcelona Dance Company's tap dance show, "Fragments", which debuted in Paris.

In 2016 and 2017 he starred as 'Marius' in Habima Theatre's Hebrew-language version of Les Miserables, Aluvei Hahayim. During the run, the role was rotated between Skaat, Elder Brentman, and fellow Israeli Eurovision entrant Imri Ziv.

== Musical style ==
Skaat has been called a "convincing and captivating" performer and his singing has been described as "smooth, precise, very clean and very clear". In an article reviewing the first decade of the century in Israeli music he was called "the most passionate singer in Israel from 2006–2007". In addition to the criticisms of Skaat's music which has been noted elsewhere in the article, some of the criticism of the singer has focused on his association with Kokhav Nolad and the phenomenon of instant celebrity. A 2006 article published on Nrg.co.il criticized the pleasant, but "mainstreamed" and essentially non-progressive nature of the dominant contemporary Israeli pop music, including that by Skaat, Shay Gabso, Ninet Tayeb, Harel Moyal, and other Kokhav Nolad graduates.

Skaat has said, "My wish was always to be a singer, and I'm still working on it." Skaat is one of many well-known singers, both past and present, of Yemenite Jewish heritage—a long line that includes Bracha Zefira, Shoshana Damari, Haim Moshe, Zohar Argov, Ofra Haza, Gali Atari, Dana International, Achinoam Nini (Noa), and many others. However, unlike the music of some Yemenite Jewish singers, there have been generally few hints of the distinctive singing style often associated with that culture in Skaat's music. Although Skaat has said that he has been influenced by Rivka Zohar and he has named Rami Kleinstein and Sarit Hadad as two of his favorite singers, he stated in a February 2010 interview that, "I don't think I [have] ever been influenced by someone in specific. I have always listened to so many different kinds of music. I feel as if I have learned from each singer I listened to and still do. From the vigor of the great female singers, through the song interpretation of French performers to the intricate structures of classical music pieces. I find inspiration in them all!"

Skaat was reportedly set to work on a new album, to be recorded in English, the first of his that would be targeted at an international audience. Grammy award-winning producer, Narada Michael Walden, who has worked with several musicians, including Whitney Houston and Mariah Carey has been linked to the project. However, after the original reports, there have been no major updates on the status of the project in the major Israeli media for some time.

== Special recognition ==
In late 2009, to celebrate the end of the decade on the Jewish calendar, Israeli radio station Galgalatz and television station Channel 24 conducted a number of special polls in which the public selected their favorite songs, singers, bands, and music videos of the past decade. Skaat placed second on the poll for the male singer of the decade (after Eyal Golan), while two of his songs, "Ve'at" and "Hineni Kan", placed fourth and 21st respectively on the poll for song of the decade ("Mima'amakim" by the Idan Raichel Project placed first on the poll). The winners and a countdown of the top 20 songs were revealed live on Israeli television at an all-star show on 15 October 2009 at Jerusalem's Sultan's Pool in front of an estimated 8,000 spectators. The concert featured many of the musicians (including Skaat) performing songs that made it on the poll.

== Personal life ==
In a documentary first broadcast on Israeli television in October 2010, Skaat stated that he is gay. The statement came after years of public speculation about Skaat's sexual orientation and after a controversial public outing by Israeli film producer and gay activist, Gal Uchovsky, after Skaat performed at a July 2010 memorial to mark the one-year anniversary of an attack on a Tel Aviv gay youth center.

Skaat is married to Idan Roll, a model, a lawyer and current Knesset member. On 7 March 2021, Skaat and Roll announced their wedding on social media, which had taken place on 5 March 2021 in Provo, Utah, USA.

In June 2010, Skaat purchased an apartment at one of the Arlosoroff Towers, a pair of planned commercial and residential high rise buildings in Tel Aviv's Ayalon Triangle. Skaat has been actively involved with charities aimed at children with disabilities. For recreation, he sometimes likes to engage in high thrill activities, such as skydiving, bungee jumping, and rafting.

In 2017, Sakat called on youth from the gay community to not enlist in the Israeli army and not to pay taxes, after the ministry of welfare had refused to allow homosexual couples to adopt children. He later apologised for the tweet.

== Discography ==
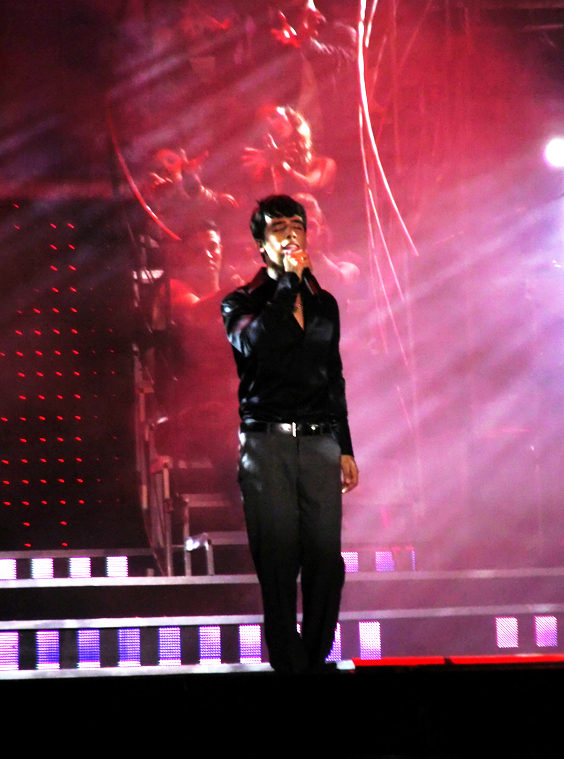
Harel Skaat in concert in Tel Aviv (2006)

=== Studio albums ===
Year	Title
2006	Harel Skaat (הראל סקעת)
2009	Dmuyot (דמויות, Figures)
2012	Shuv Meushar (שוב מאושר, Happy Again)
2017	Ahava Mesovevet Hakol (אהבה מסובבת הכל, Love Turns Everything)

=== EPs ===
Year	Title
2010	Eurovision 2010 (אירוויזיון 2010)

=== Singles ===
Year	Title	Songwriter(s)
2002	Ein Od Si'kui (אין עוד סיכוי, No More Chance)	Shmuel Elbaz (שמואל אלבז)
2006	Ve'at (ואת, And You)	Keren Peles (קרן פלס)
2006	Kama Od Efshar (כמה עוד אפשר, How Much)	Sagit Shir (שגית שיר)
2006	Mashehu Mimeni (משהו ממני, Something from Me)	Dor Daniel (דור דניאל)
2006	Kol Hatziporim (כל הציפורים, All the Birds)	Keren Peles (קרן פלס)
2007	Im Hu Yelech (אם הוא ילך, If He Goes)	Kfir Epstein (כפיר אפשטיין)
2009	Muvan Li Achshav (מובן לי עכשיו, It's Clear to Me Now)	Ofer Bashan (עפר בשן)
2009	Boi Ha Yom (בואי היום, Come Today)	Yahli Sobol (יהלי סובול)
2009	Sof (סוף, End)	Elai Botner, Harel Skaat (עילי בוטנר, הראל סקעת)
2009	Od Yair Alay (עוד יאיר עלי, His Light Will Shine on Me)	Ofer Bashan, Benny Bashan, Harel Skaat (עפר בשן, בני בשן, הראל סקעת)
2010	Milim (מילים, Words)	Tomer Adaddi, Noam Horev (תומר הדדי, נועם חורב)
2011	Od Tihye Li Ahava (תהיה לי אהבה, I Will Have Love)	Harel Skaat, Noam Horev, Yahel Doron Guy Mensch, (Ran Shem Tov, producer)
2011	21st Century (המאה ה 21)	Ran Shem Tov, producer
2011	How Many More Ways (כמה עוד דרכים)	Ran Shem Tov, producer
2013	Achshav (עכשיו)	Harel Skaat, Jason Reeves, Rune Westberg
2017	Love Turns Everything אהבה מסובבת הכל	Yahel Doron Guy Mensch, Harel Skaat, Avi Ohayon (lyrics); Remi Lacroix, D'avide Esposito (music); Yinon Yahel (producer)
2017	Radio	Harel Skaat / Desiree Ramialison (lyrics); William Rousseau (music), Pierre Jaconelli (arrangement)
2018	Im Nin'Alu / אם ננעלו	Lyrics: Rabbi Shalom Shabazi; Musical Arrangement and Production - Yinon Yahel

Awards and achievements
Preceded by Noa & Mira Awad with "There Must Be Another Way"	Israel in the Eurovision Song Contest; 2010	Succeeded by Dana International with "Ding Dong"
