= Noa (Israeli singer) =

Israeli musical artist (born 1969)

Noa נועה
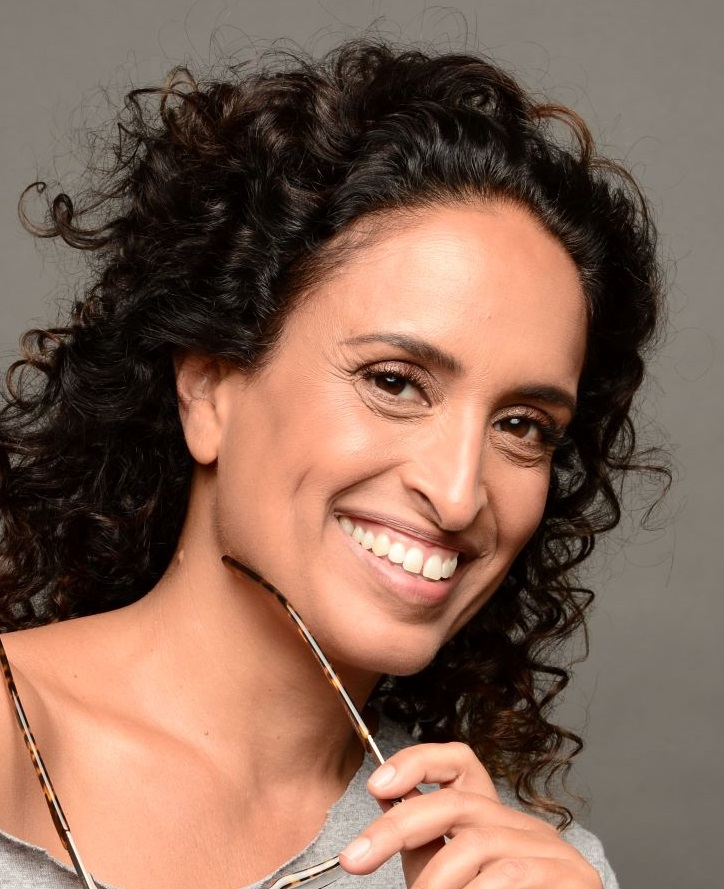
- Noa in 2012

Background information
- Born: Achinoam Nini; 23 June 1969 (age 57); Tel Aviv, Israel
- Genres: Pop, world, Hebrew, jazz, blues
- Occupation: Singer
- Instrument: Vocals
- Years active: 1990–present
- Labels: NMC, Geffen Records, Universal Records, Believe Digital, Naïve Records
- Website: noasmusic.com

Achinoam Nini (Hebrew: אחינועם ניני, romanized: Aẖinóʿam Nini; born 23 June 1969), known professionally as Noa (נועה), is an Israeli singer-songwriter, percussionist, poet, composer, and human rights activist working internationally. She is accompanied by guitarist Gil Dor and often plays the conga drums and percussions as she sings. Noa represented Israel at the Eurovision Song Contest 2009 together with singer Mira Awad, with the song "There Must Be Another Way". Her music is known to fuse languages and styles. She has performed in 52 countries and was the first Israeli artist to perform in the Vatican.

== Early and personal life ==
Noa was born in Tel Aviv, Israel, to a family of Yemenite Jewish origin. She moved to Riverdale, Bronx when she was two years old. She attended SAR Academy and Rabbi Joseph H. Lookstein Upper School of Ramaz High School, remaining in New York until her return to Israel alone at the age of 16.

She completed her mandatory service in the Israel Defense Forces, serving as a singer in the military band of the Northern Command. After her release she studied music at the Rimon School of Jazz and Contemporary Music in Ramat HaSharon, Israel, where she met her long-time partner and collaborator Gil Dor, then a faculty member of the school.

Noa is married to Asher Barak, an Israeli pediatrician. They have three children.

== Music career ==
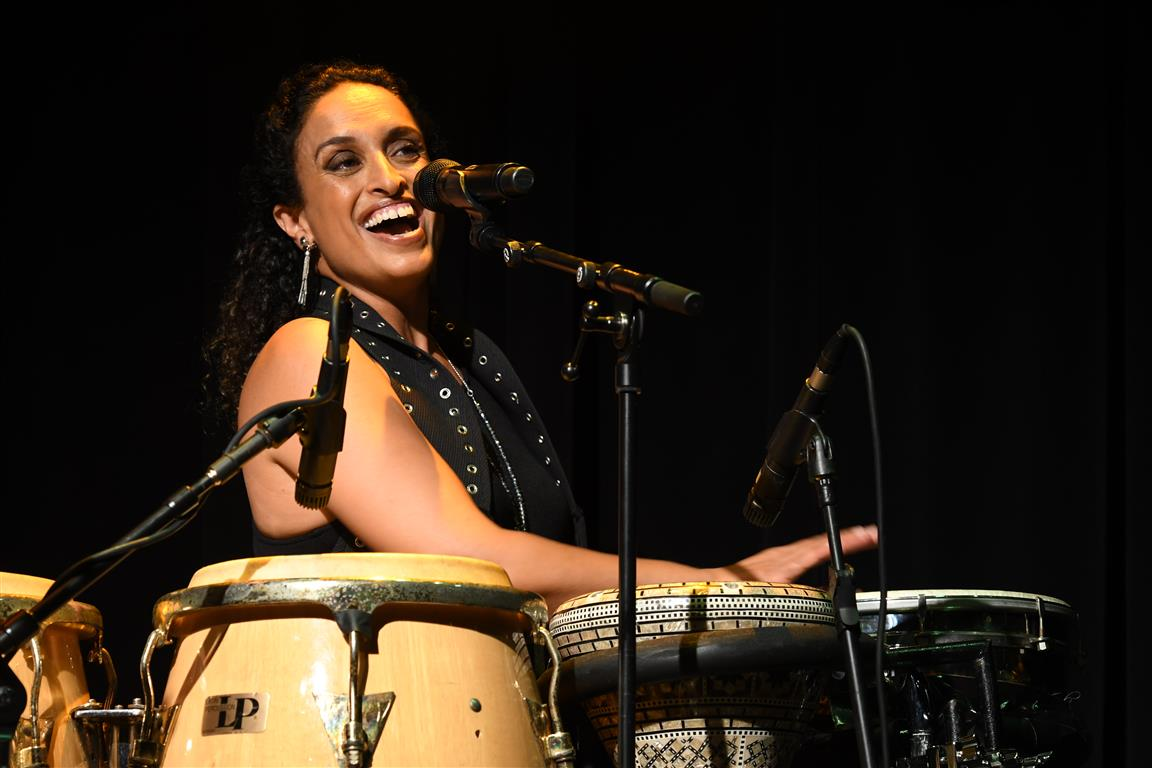
Noa performs at the Zappa Club, Herzliya, October 2018

Noa has performed in a variety of locations around the world, including Carnegie Hall and Avery Fisher Hall in New York City, Olympia in Paris, Rome's Colosseum, The Barbican in London, Zellerbach Auditorium in Berkeley, California, the Ravinia Festival in Chicago, the Montreux Jazz Festival in Switzerland, the North Sea Jazz Festival in the Netherlands, the Stockholm Water Festival in Sweden, Palau de la Música Catalana in Barcelona and Teatro Real in Madrid.

Noa has recorded songs in English, Hebrew, Yemenite Hebrew, Spanish, Neapolitan, French, Italian, Sardinian, Galician, and Arabic. Noa and Gil Dor have had various ensembles since their early days as an acoustic duet. Noa and Dor's ensembles vary from album to album, ranging from collaborations with musicians such as: Zohar Fresco, Steve Rodby, Solis String Quartet, Hila Carni and symphonic orchestras around the world. Noa's music is influenced by the singer-songwriters of the 60s such as Paul Simon, Joni Mitchell, Leonard Cohen, and James Taylor. These musical and lyrical sensibilities, combined with Noa's Yemenite roots and Dor's background in jazz, classical rock, have created Noa and Dor's unique sound audible through hundreds of songs written and performed by the duo. Noa plays percussion, guitar and piano.

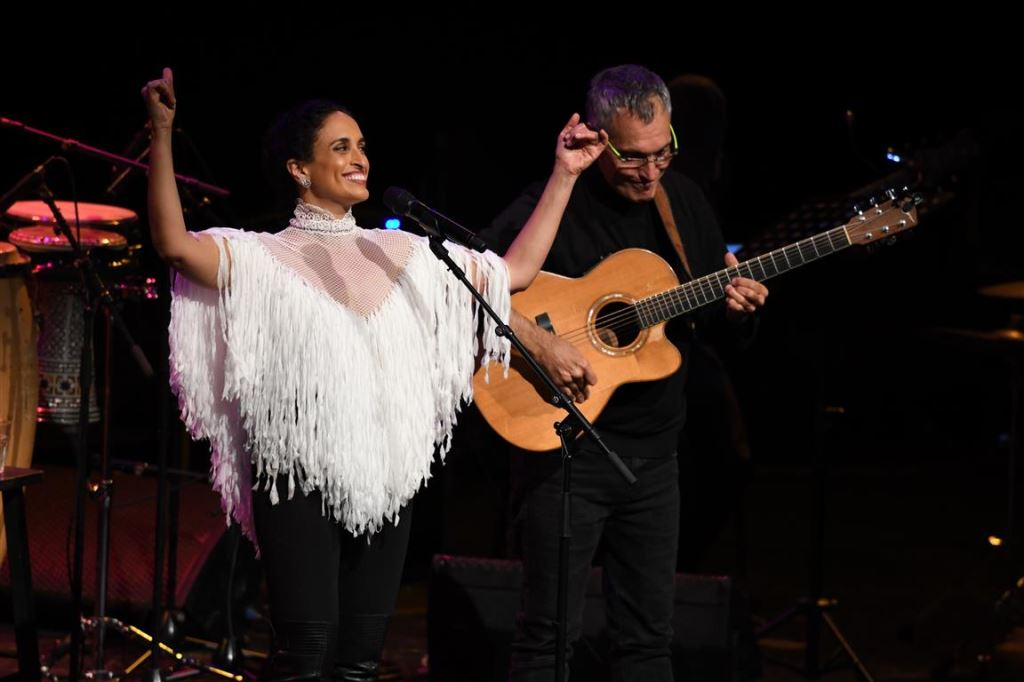
Noa performs with Gil Dor at the Performance Arts Center, Tel Aviv, March 2019

In 1994, Noa performed Ave Maria with English lyrics she wrote for a live audience of 100,000 and a TV audience of millions at the closing event of the International Year of the Family at the Vatican, Rome, Italy, witnessed by Pope John Paul II.

Noa and Dor have performed on numerous occasions with the Israel Philharmonic Orchestra. They recorded an album during a live performance at Tel Aviv's Mann Auditorium in 1997. Over the years they have collaborated with symphonic orchestras from Lille, Messina, Parma, Murcia, and Florence. In September 2003, Noa performed an orchestral piece entitled L'isola della Luce (after the Greek island on which it was performed) which was written by Nicola Piovani especially for her. The work was commissioned by the Cultural Olympics Committee in Athens. In May 2004, the duo performed with the Israeli rhythm and dance troupe Mayumana between the two final games of the Euroleague basketball championship.

== Eurovision Song Contest ==
Together with Arab-Israeli singer Mira Awad, Noa represented Israel at the Eurovision Song Contest 2009. Their song "There Must Be Another Way" qualified for the first semi-final but eventually finished in 16th place. About the song, Noa said, "If we can truly empathize with each other's sorrow, if we can cry together, then we can also reach the next level of building and overcoming all our other differences."

== Soundtracks ==
In 1998, Noa recorded the part of Esmeralda in French for the original soundtrack of the multi-Platinum selling "Notre Dame de Paris", but did not play the role in the musical. Her song "Babel", written in English, French and Hebrew as theme song for the Gerard Pullicino movie of the same name, topped the charts in France the following year.

Noa collaborated with French composer Éric Serra on two songs: one for the film The Experience of Love from the James Bond film GoldenEye, and the song "My Heart Is Calling" from the Luc Besson film The Messenger.

In 2000, Noa recorded the theme song "La vita è bella" of the film "Life Is Beautiful", Roberto Benigni's Oscar award-winning film. Noa also wrote the lyrics to the song now titled "Beautiful That Way", together with Dor. The song was recorded and released with the album Blue Touches Blue, and also appears on the soundtrack to the film as well as on her album Noa Gold in two versions.

== Duets and collaborations ==
Noa and Dor have collaborated with Khaled from Algeria, Nabil Salameh, of Palestinian origin, born in Lebanon, Handallah from Nablus, Rim Banna from Nazareth, Amal Murkus from Kfar Yasif, and Mira Awad from Kfar Raameh.

Due to her success in Spain, Noa has also developed several duets with Spanish artists, singing Spanish songs in Spanish. Starting La vida es bella with singer Miguel Bosé, she also recorded Es caprichoso el azar along with Joan Manuel Serrat or Tú y yo along with Joaquín Sabina.

In May 2002, she took part in a concert at the Rome Colosseum, under the banner of "Time for Life – A Tribute for Peace", featuring Ray Charles, Mercedes Sosa, Khaled, Nicola Piovani, and artists from Afghanistan, Sarajevo, Belgrade, Africa and Ireland. In May 2004, she performed in We Are the Future, a globally telecast fund raising concert for children in conflict areas. On 2 July 2005, she performed in Bono and Bob Geldof's Live 8 concert in Rome's Circo Massimo. In September 2005, she performed at the Ambrosetti Forum which took place in Villa d'Este, Como, Italy, in the presence of Shimon Peres, Saeb Erekat and Amr Moussa.

In November 2010, Noa and Mira Awad performed at the closing concert of the Science for Peace event hosted by the Fondazione Umberto Veronesi at the Bocconi University in Milan, Italy.

In February 2025, Noa and Mira Awad performed at the first night of the Italian Sanremo Music Festival with a cover of "Imagine", addressing the Gaza war.

== Awards and recognition ==
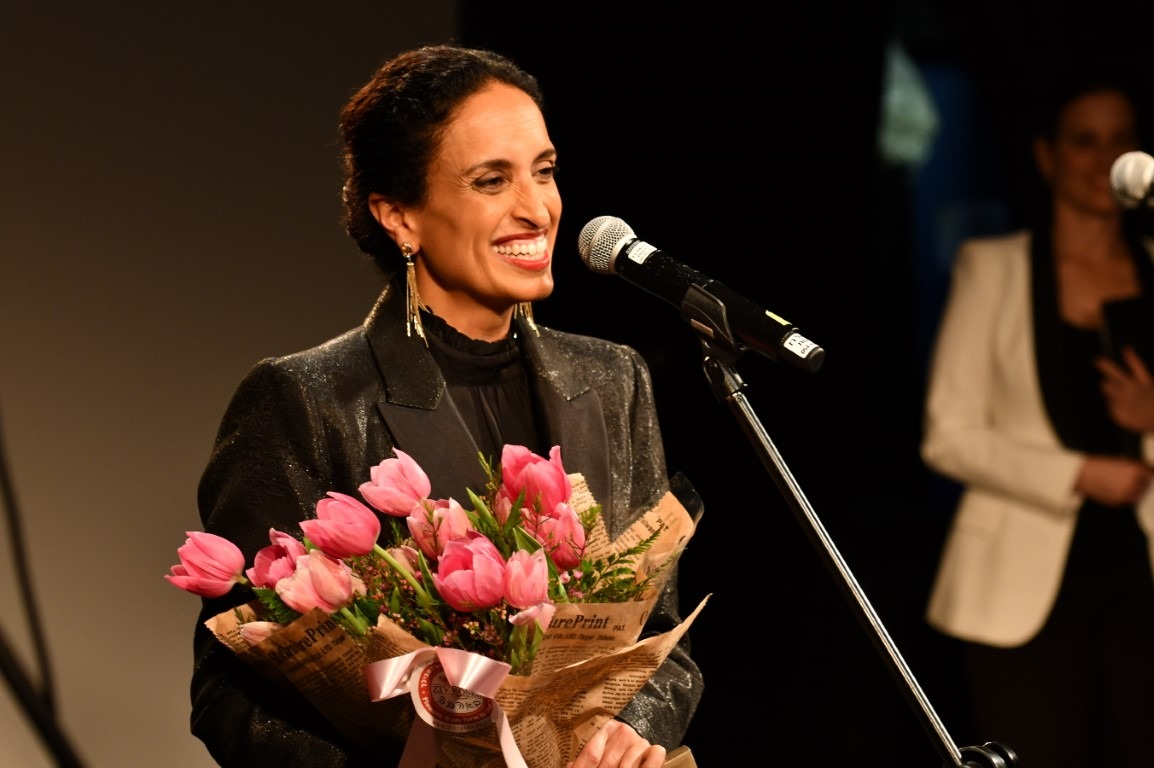
Noa receives the Shulamit Aloni's Lifetime Achievement award, 2019.

- In 1998 Noa won the "Crystal Award" by the "World Economic Forum" in Davos, Switzerland, where she performed together with Palestinian artists and participated in numerous panels dealing with peace in the Middle East and the role of art and artists towards bringing it about.
- In 2000, the mayor of Melpignano, Italy, awarded honorary citizenship to Noa and Nabil Salameh (a Palestinian singer songwriter) for their activity for peace.
- In 2003 Noa was nominated Israel's first "Goodwill Ambassador" for FAO, the United Nations' Food and Agriculture Organization.
- On 3 April 2005, Noa became the first woman to receive the medal of the "Galileo Galilei" order from the "Grand Orient", the Italian arm of the Freemasons.
- On 7 August 2005, Noa received the "Gemona Seminar" prize for artistic excellence and her contribution to peace and understanding.
- In 2006, Noa won the "Mia Martini Critics' Award" at the 56th Sanremo Music Festival in Italy, appearing with the Solis String Quartet and Carlo Fava.
- In 2008, Noa became a "Cavaliere della Republica" – Knight of the Italian Republic.
- In 2018, she was honored with the title "Commendatore Ordine al Merito della Repubblica Italiana" – Commander of the order of merit of the Italian republic.
- In 2018, Noa was also named "Pellegrino de Pace", Pilgrim of Peace, Assisi.
- In 2019, Noa was awarded the Shulamit Aloni Lifetime Achievement Award.

== Discography ==
Noa and Gil have written and produced three albums: Achinoam Nini and Gil Dor Live, Achinoam Nini and Gil Dor (also known as Rachel and Leah), and Achinoam Nini. Their five international albums are Noa (produced by Pat Metheny) and Calling (produced by Rupert Hine) for Geffen Records, Blue Touches Blue (produced by Mike Hedges) for Mercury Records, Now (produced by Gil Dor & Yoad Nevo) and Genes & Jeans (produced by Gil Dor) for Universal Music. In addition, Noa recorded a live album with the Israel Philharmonic Orchestra, and a live CD and DVD with The Solis String Quartet.

=== Studio albums ===
- Achinoam Nini and Gil Dor (September 1993)
- Noa (March 1994)
- Calling (May 1996)
- Achinoam Nini (April 1997)
- Blue Touches Blue (March 2000)
- Now (September 2002)
- Genes & Jeans (April 2008)
- Noapolis – Noa Sings Napoli (February 2011)
- The Israeli Songbook (March 2011)
- Love Medicine (2015)
- Letters to Bach (2019)
- Afterallogy (2021)
- The Giver and the See (2026)

=== Live albums ===
- Achinoam Nini and Gil Dor Live (July 1991)
- Achinoam Nini & the Israel Philharmonic Orchestra (April 1998)
- Noa Live – DVD/Double CD with the Solis Quartet (October 2005)
- Napoli-Tel Aviv (September 2006)

=== Compilations and other albums ===
- First Collection (March 2001)
- Noa Gold (October 2003)
- There Must Be Another Way – with Mira Awad (2009)

=== Singles ===
- Mishaela (Be'eineiha) (1992)
- Uri (Akara) (1992)
- He (Boi Kala) (1993)
- Nocturno (Keren Or) (1993)
- I Don't Know (1994)
- Ave Maria (1994)
- Wildflower (1995)
- Child of Man (1995)
- U.N.I (1996)
- Too Proud (1996)
- Lama (1996)
- Mark of Cain (1996)
- By the Light of the Moon (1996)
- Vivre (1997)
- Nanua (1997)
- Mushrooms (Pitriot) (1997)
- But Love (Aval Ahava) (1997)
- Babel (1999)
- One Becomes Two (1999)
- Beautiful That Way (2000)
- If I Give You Everything (2000)
- The Beauty of That (2000)
- Again and Again (Otra Vez) (2001)
- Eye in the Sky (2002)
- We (2002)
- Now Forget (2003)
- Shalom, Shalom (2003)
- Dreamer (2008)
- Genes & Jeans (2008)
- There Must Be Another Way (2008)
- Someone Out There (Yesh Ey Sham) (2011)
- There Were Nights (Hayu Leilot) (2011)
- Autumn Wind (Ruach Stav) (2011)
- Lullabye (Shir Eres) (2011)
- Nothing But a Song (2014)

== FAO ambassador ==
In October 2003, Noa was named Goodwill Ambassador of the Food and Agriculture Organization of the United Nations.

== Political views ==
Noa has considered herself to have left-wing political views in various occasions, claiming she repeatedly faced harsh criticism in her home country of Israel "for being outspoken about peace". Throughout her career, she took part in several events celebrating Israel's Independence Day around the world, including live performances in London and Vancouver.

The singer has also been an advocate for a peaceful resolution of the Arab–Israeli conflict, citing the assassination of Yitzhak Rabin in November 1995 as a turning point for her political activity (she had been performing at the rally minutes before Rabin was murdered); she has publicly supported a two-state solution and aligned with organizations promoting co-existence between Arab-Palestinian and Jewish citizens of Israel. In February 2016, following the publication of a then-deleted report from the Jerusalem Post, which alleged that Noa supported Boycott, Divestment and Sanctions, she denied having any kind of ties to the movement, stating that she herself was "a victim of its hypocritical and harmful activity."

An outspoken critic of Benjamin Netanyahu's politics, Noa openly condemned the judicial reform backed by the Prime Minister's sixth cabinet in 2023, confirming she was involved in the resulting protests and stating that Israel was facing "the worst crisis of its history".

She has expressed solidarity with Palestinians facing eviction in the West Bank.

Awards and achievements
Preceded by Bo'az with The Fire in Your Eyes	Israel in the Eurovision Song Contest (with Mira Awad); 2009	Succeeded by Harel Ska'at with Milim
