= Israel in the Eurovision Song Contest 2010 =

- Eurovision Song Contest 2010
- Participating broadcaster: Israel Broadcasting Authority (IBA)
- Country: Israel
- Selection process: Artist: Internal selection Song: Kdam Eurovision 2010
- Selection date: Artist: 25 December 2009; Song: 15 March 2010

Competing entry
- Song: "Milim"
- Artist: Harel Skaat
- Songwriters: Tomer Hadadi; Noam Horev

Placement
- Semi-final result: Qualified (8th, 71 points)
- Final result: 14th, 71 points

Participation chronology

Israel was represented at the Eurovision Song Contest 2010 with the song "Milim" written by Tomer Hadadi and Noam Horev. The song was performed by Harel Skaat, who was internally selected by the Israeli broadcaster Israel Broadcasting Authority (IBA) in collaboration with the commercial broadcaster Reshet in December 2009 to compete at the 2010 contest in Oslo, Norway. The song Skaat would perform at Eurovision was selected through the national final Kdam Eurovision 2010 which took place on 15 March 2010 that featured four songs. "Milim" emerged as the winning song after achieving the highest score following the combination of votes from four thematical jury groups, a jury panel and a public vote.

Israel was drawn to compete in the second semi-final of the Eurovision Song Contest which took place on 27 May 2010. Performing during the show in position 3, "Milim" was announced among the top 10 entries of the second semi-final and therefore qualified to compete in the final on 29 May. It was later revealed that Israel placed eighth out of the 17 participating countries in the semi-final with 71 points. In the final, Israel performed in position 24 and placed fourteenth out of the 25 participating countries, scoring 71 points.

== Background ==
Prior to the 2010 contest, the Israel Broadcasting Authority (IBA) had participated in the Eurovision Song Contest representing Israel thirty-two times since its first entry in 1973. Israel has won the contest on three occasions: in 1978 with the song "A-Ba-Ni-Bi" performed by Izhar Cohen and the Alphabeta, in 1979 with the song "Hallelujah" performed by Milk and Honey, and in 1998 with the song "Diva" performed by Dana International. Since the introduction of semi-finals to the format of the Eurovision Song Contest in 2004, Israel has, to this point, managed to qualify to the final four times, including two top ten results in 2005 with Shiri Maimon and "HaSheket SheNish'ar" placing fourth, and in 2008 with Boaz and "The Fire In Your Eyes" placing ninth. Israel had qualified to the final for two consecutive years in 2008 and 2009, which included their 2009 entry "There Must Be Another Way" performed by Noa and Mira Awad.

As part of its duties as participating broadcaster, IBA organises the selection of its entry in the Eurovision Song Contest and broadcasts the event in the country. The broadcaster confirmed its participation in the 2010 contest on 2 December 2009 and formalised a collaboration with commercial broadcaster Reshet in order to select its entry for 2010. This was the second time that the Israeli entry would be selected through a collaboration with Reshet; IBA collaborated with the entity in order to select the Israeli entry in 2008. Between 2007 and 2009, IBA conducted an internal selection to select the artist that would represent Israel and a national final to select the song for the artist, a selection procedure that continued for their 2010 entry.

== Before Eurovision ==
=== Artist selection ===
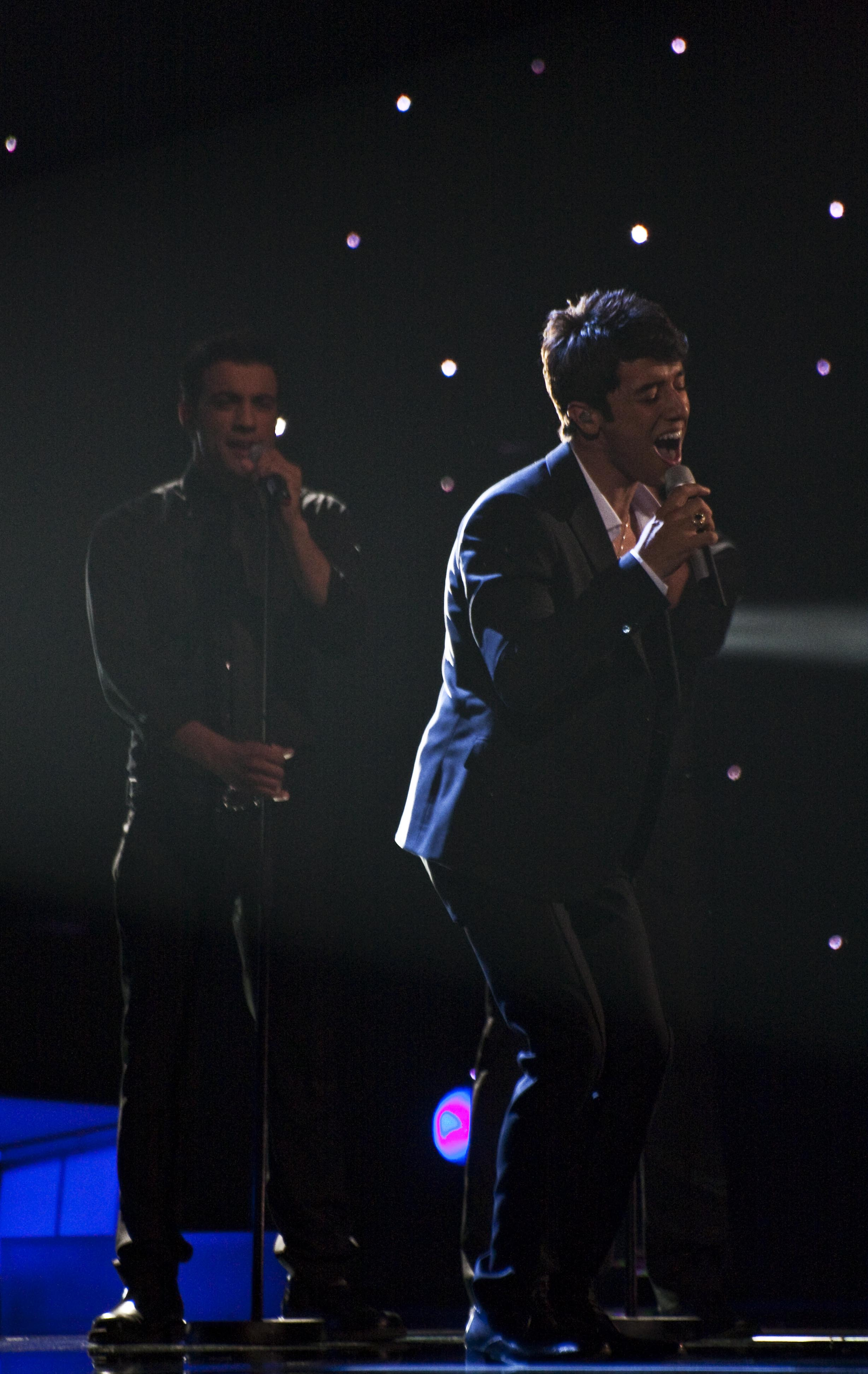
Harel Skaat performing Milim

On 25 December 2009, IBA announced that Harel Skaat was selected as the Israeli representative for the Eurovision Song Contest 2010. Information that Skaat would represent Israel was reported on 23 December 2009 by newspaper Maariv. A professional committee with members from IBA considered several artists, of which Maya Bouskilla and Vladi Blayberg were highly considered before Skaat was ultimately selected. The members of the committee were Yoav Ginai (entertainment director of IBA), Mordechai Shkaler (Head of IBA), Yaela Granot (IBA plenum representative), Avraham Doron (IBA plenum representative), Yuval Ganor (director of 88FM), Noam Gil-Or (director of Reshet Gimmel) and Zviah Issachar (marketing director of IBA). It was also announced that a national final titled Kdam Eurovision 2010 featuring four songs would take place to select his song.

=== Kdam Eurovision 2010 ===
Kdam Eurovision 2010 logo

Four songs were chosen for the competition by a special committee consisting of music industry professionals and members from IBA from several submissions by composers and announced on 22 February 2010. The members of the committee were Noam Gil-Or (director of Reshet Gimmel), Yaakov Naveh (IBA artists representative), Yuval Ganor (director of 88FM), Dorit Gvirtzman (director of Gil Productions), Oren Gazit (director of Reshet), Yuval Cohen (chief editor of Reshet), Gali Atari (winner of the Eurovision Song Contest 1979) and Eli Avramov (musician and arranger). Prior to the final, the songs were released online on 7 March 2010.

==== Final ====
The final took place on 15 March 2010 at the Neve Ilan TV Studios in Jerusalem, hosted by Ofer Schechter and broadcast on Channel 2 as well as online via reshet.ynet.co.il. All four competing songs were performed by Harel Skaat and the winning song, "Milim", was selected by a combination of the votes from six voting groups: four thematical jury groups (25%), an expert jury of IBA and Reshet representatives (25%) and a public vote (50%). The judging panel thematical group was composed of Moshe Datz, Svika Pick and Mira Awad. The public vote that took place during the show was conducted through telephone and SMS. In addition to the performances of the competing songs, Gali Atari performed her Eurovision Song Contest 1979 winning song "Hallelujah" as the opening act, while Shlomi Saranga performed as the interval act. The show also featured a judging panel composed of Moshe Datz (1991 Israeli Eurovision entrant), Svika Pick and Mira Awad (2009 Israeli Eurovision entrant) which formed one of the four thematical groups and provided feedback to the songs.

Final – 15 March 2010
R/O	Song	Songwriter(s)	Jury	Televote	Total	Place
1	"Le'an" (לאן)	Eyal Shahar, Sahar Hagay	88	100	188	2
2	"Ela'yich" (אלייך)	Ohad Chitman, Noam Horev	72	80	152	3
3	"Le'hitkarev" (להתקרב)	Nitzan Keikov, Sahar Hagay	20	0	20	4
4	"Milim" (מילים)	Tomer Hadadi, Noam Horev	120	120	240	1

Detailed Jury Results
R/O	Song	Knesset	OGAE Israel	Harel Skaat Fan Club	Judging panel	Expert jury	Total
1	"Le'an"	10	8		20	50	88
2	"Ela'yich"	8		8	16	40	72
3	"Le'hitkarev"		10	10			20
4	"Milim"	12	12	12	24	60	120

== At Eurovision ==
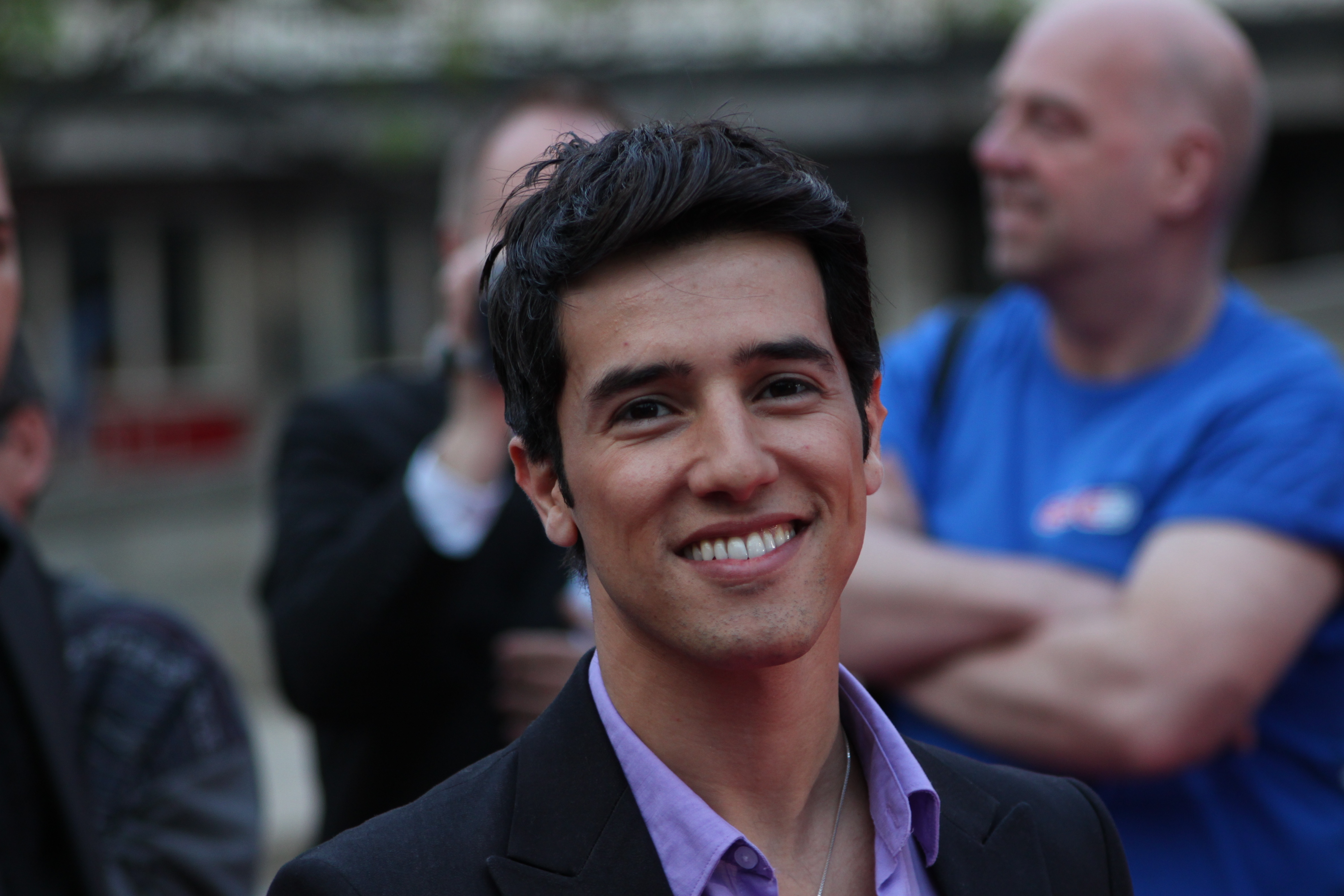
Harel Skaat at the Eurovision Opening Party in Oslo

According to Eurovision rules, all nations with the exceptions of the host country and the "Big Four" (France, Germany, Spain and the United Kingdom) are required to qualify from one of two semi-finals in order to compete for the final; the top ten countries from each semi-final progress to the final. The European Broadcasting Union (EBU) split up the competing countries into six different pots based on voting patterns from previous contests, with countries with favourable voting histories put into the same pot. On 7 February 2010, a special allocation draw was held which placed each country into one of the two semi-finals. Israel was placed into the second semi-final, to be held on 27 May 2010. The running order for the semi-finals was decided through another draw on 3 March 2010 and Israel was set to perform in position 3, following the entry from Armenia and before the entry from Denmark.

In Israel, the two semi-finals and the final were televised live on IBA. The Israeli spokesperson, who announced the Israeli votes during the final, was Ofer Nachshon.

=== Semi-final ===
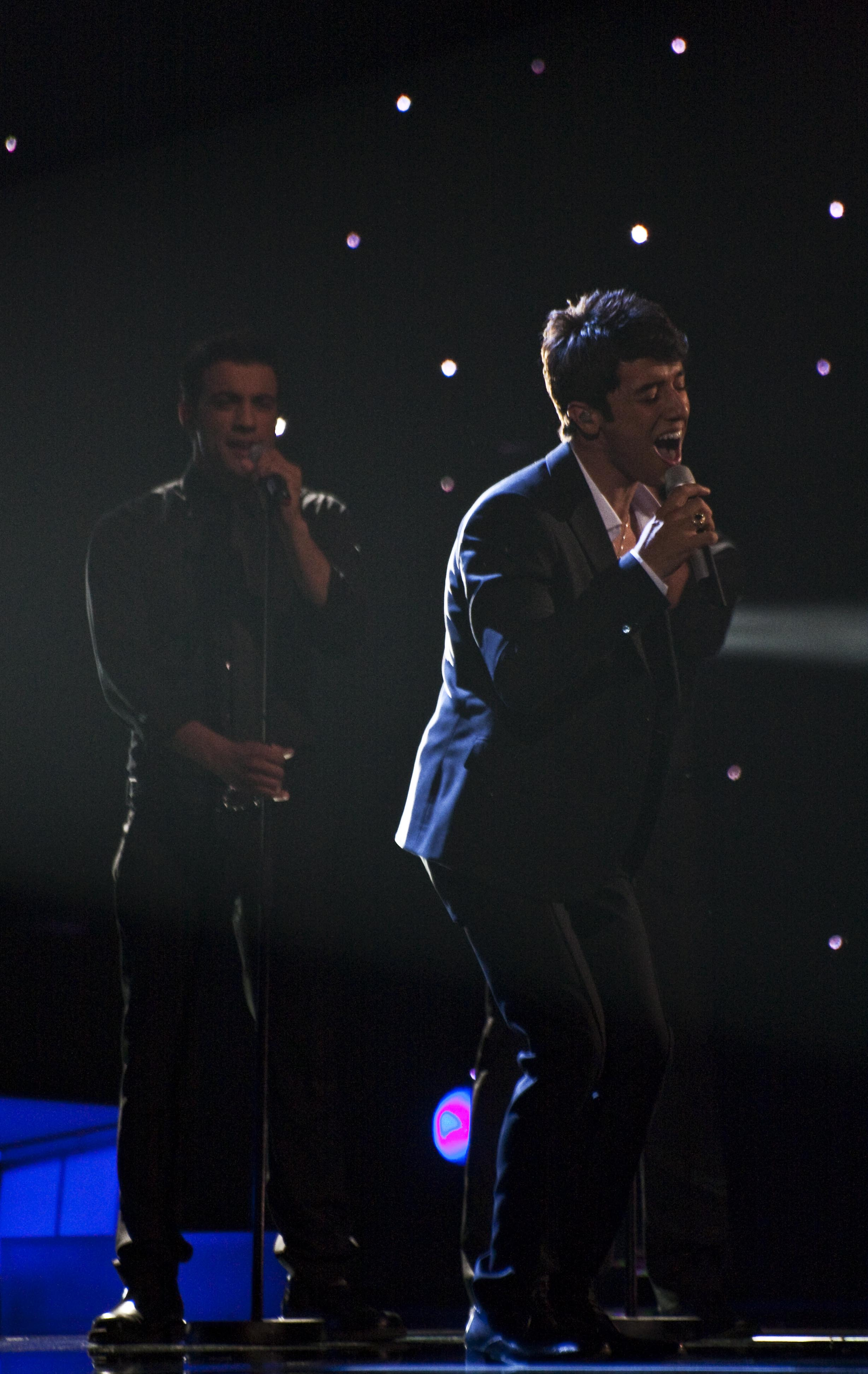
Harel Skaat during a rehearsal before the second semi-final

Harel Skaat took part in technical rehearsals on 18 and 21 May, followed by dress rehearsals on 26 and 27 May. This included the jury show on 11 May where the professional juries of each country watched and voted on the competing entries.

The Israeli performance featured Harel Skaat performing in a black suit together with three male backing vocalists, one of which also played a piano. The stage colours transitioned from white to blue with spotlights directing to the audience. The three backing vocalists performing on stage with Harel Skaat were Lior Ashkenazi, Saar Zabak and the co-composer of "Milim" Tomer Hadadi.

At the end of the show, Israel was announced as having finished in the top 10 and subsequently qualifying for the grand final. It was later revealed that Israel placed eighth in the semi-final, receiving a total of 71 points.

=== Final ===
Shortly after the second semi-final, a winners' press conference was held for the ten qualifying countries. As part of this press conference, the qualifying artists took part in a draw to determine the running order of the final. This draw was done in the order the countries appeared in the semi-final running order. Israel was drawn to perform in position 24, following the entry from Portugal and before the entry from Denmark.

Harel Skaat once again took part in dress rehearsals on 28 and 29 May before the final, including the jury final where the professional juries cast their final votes before the live show. Harel Skaat performed a repeat of his semi-final performance during the final on 29 May. Israel placed fourteenth in the final, scoring 71 points.

==== Marcel Bezençon Awards ====
The Marcel Bezençon Awards, first awarded during the 2002 contest, are awards honouring the best competing songs in the final each year. Named after the creator of the annual contest, Marcel Bezençon, the awards are divided into 3 categories: the Press Award, given to the best entry as voted on by the accredited media and press during the event; the Artistic Award, presented to the best artist as voted on by the shows' commentators; and the Composer Award, given to the best and most original composition as voted by the participating composers. Harel Skaat was awarded all three awards, which were accepted at the awards ceremony by Skaat and the songwriters Tomer Hadadi and Noam Horev.

=== Voting ===
Voting during the three shows involved each country awarding points from 1-8, 10 and 12 as determined by a combination of 50% national jury and 50% televoting. Each nation's jury consisted of five music industry professionals who are citizens of the country they represent. This jury judged each entry based on: vocal capacity; the stage performance; the song's composition and originality; and the overall impression by the act. In addition, no member of a national jury was permitted to be related in any way to any of the competing acts in such a way that they cannot vote impartially and independently.

Below is a breakdown of points awarded to Israel and awarded by Israel in the second semi-final and grand final of the contest. The nation awarded its 12 points to Armenia in the semi-final and the final of the contest.

==== Points awarded to Israel ====
Points awarded to Israel (Semi-final 2)
Score	Country
12 points	Netherlands
10 points	
8 points	Armenia; Sweden
7 points	Azerbaijan; Norway
6 points	Ukraine
5 points	Georgia; Slovenia; United Kingdom
4 points	Cyprus
3 points	Romania
2 points	
1 point	Bulgaria

Points awarded to Israel (Final)
Score	Country
12 points	
10 points	Finland; Netherlands
8 points	Belarus; Slovakia
7 points	
6 points	Slovenia
5 points	Azerbaijan; Norway
4 points	Albania; Georgia
3 points	Ukraine; United Kingdom
2 points	Cyprus
1 point	Bosnia and Herzegovina; France; Moldova

==== Points awarded by Israel ====
Points awarded by Israel (Semi-final 2)
Score	Country
12 points	Armenia
10 points	Cyprus
8 points	Romania
7 points	Denmark
6 points	Georgia
5 points	Azerbaijan
4 points	Netherlands
3 points	Ireland
2 points	Ukraine
1 point	Slovenia

Points awarded by Israel (Final)
Score	Country
12 points	Armenia
10 points	Russia
8 points	Romania
7 points	Azerbaijan
6 points	Ireland
5 points	Georgia
4 points	Denmark
3 points	France
2 points	Ukraine
1 point	Spain
