= Arab Orchestra of Nazareth =

Israeli orchestra

The Arab Orchestra of Nazareth is an Israeli orchestra that plays Arab and Mediterranean music. It was founded in 1991 by conductor and musicologist Suhil Radwan.

The Nazareth Orchestra performs in Israel and abroad. It has performed in world music festivals as well as Jazz festivals in New York's Central Park, in many European capitals and in the Pas Festival in Morocco. The orchestra's soloists took part in The Samarkand International Oriental Music Competition, winning third prize; in the Earth Festival in Kenya and have also performed in the successful Israeli film The Orchestra Visit. The orchestra has been part of the Israel Festival, the Carmiel Dance Festival, Jaffa Festival, Oud Festival of Tel Aviv and the Culture Of Peace Festival.

The orchestra's manager and international agent is Eli Grunfeld. Its conductor is Dr. Nizar Raduwan. He has released a personal album entitled Haifa (Magda). Among the orchestra's singers are Lubna Salama, Hiba Battihish, Alias Attalla and Maamun Zayud. The orchestra has also performed in special concerts alongside Zehava Ben, David D'or, Dikla, Yasmin Levi and Galit Giat. The orchestra has collaborated in the past with the singer Sapho (France), Omar Faruk Tekbilek (Turkey), Thom Yorke of Radiohead (UK), Radiodervish (Lebanon/Italy), London Sinfonietta (UK), Hind Laroussi (Netherlands) and even the Israeli Oriental Metal band Orphaned Land, as well as Finnish Melodic Death/Progressive Folk Metal band Amorphis (credited as "The Orphaned Land Oriental Orchestra).

== Discography ==
- Inta Umri with Zehava Ben (Helicon Records)
- Live in Nazareth (Magda)
- 100 years to Umm Kulthum (Magda)
- Unsung Prophets & Dead Messiahs

== See also ==
- Music of Israel
- Culture of Israel
