= Milim =

2010 song by Harel Skaat

Single by Harel Skaat
- Released: 2010
- Recorded: 2010
- Genre: Pop, ballad
- Length: 3:01
- Composer: Tomer Adaddi
- Lyricist: Noam Horev

Music video
- "Milim" on YouTube

Audio sample
- file; help

Eurovision Song Contest 2010 entry
- Country: Israel
- Artist: Harel Skaat
- Language: Hebrew
- Composer: Tomer Adaddi
- Lyricist: Noam Horev

Finals performance
- Semi-final result: 8th
- Semi-final points: 71
- Final result: 14th
- Final points: 71

Entry chronology
- ◄ "There Must Be Another Way" (2009)
- "Ding Dong" (2011) ►

"Milim" (Hebrew: מילים, English: "Words") is a song recorded by the Israeli singer, Harel Skaat. It was the Israeli song entry in the Eurovision Song Contest 2010 where the Israeli entry finished 14th despite being one of the favorites.

== History ==
"Milim" was selected to be the Israeli song entry for Eurovision after winning the Kdam Eurovision 2010 in March 2010, beating out three other finalists. The selection was decided by a combination of juries' and public votes. It received maximum points from all juries as well as the televoters A special CD entitled "Eurovision 2010" was released by Skaat and contains all four songs featured in the KDAM. Both the CD and song are also available on iTunes ("Milim" is listed under the English title of "Words").

Despite finishing in 14th place, Israel swept the Eurovision sanctioned Marcel Bezencon Awards. Adaddi and Horev won the Composer Award, while Skaat won the Artistic Award for best singer and Skaat and "Milim" won the Press Award for best entry. The awards are selected by participating composers, and accredited press and media, and commentators of the Eurovision contest. In contrast to the way most songs were presented at Eurovision, Israel opted for a simple presentation with Skaat in a black suit with Adaddi playing on a grand piano, and two backup singers to Skaat's left in the back of him.

"Milim" has been described as a power ballad. The song shares similar qualities with some of Skaat's other songs, most notably his award-winning hit, "Veat". At the press conference after the second Eurovision rehearsal in Oslo, Adaddi said, "We didn't write the song for the Eurovision, as much as for Harel Skaat, who I think is an amazing singer and he interprets the song in a way that I don't know anybody else can do with such passion and also with a beautiful voice." The song starts out quietly and builds throughout until it reaches a loud crescendo near the end of the song. In between the time the song was selected at the Kdam and the Eurovision contest, the Israeli team revised the song's vocal arrangement and re-recorded the song with a full philharmonic orchestra backing.

Skaat released both a French and an English version of the song, as well as a music video. The French lyrics are by former Eurovision winner, Anne Marie David It also has been reported that Skaat plans to record and release a Spanish version of the song, with the lyrics translated by Marta Gomez, who has previously worked with Idan Raichel.

"Milim" was a hit on Israeli radio stations throughout the Spring of 2010 and spent a total of five weeks at number one on the Reshet Gimmel Chart, one of the major music charts in Israel, including that of the entire month of May 2010.

In an interview prior to the Eurovision contest, Skaat explained what the song was about to him. He said, "The song 'Milim' is about separation of any kind. Separation of lovers, of a family. In Hebrew, 'Milim' means words. The words are the most memorable thing we have after a separation, words are very powerful and they are engraved in our minds and hearts. Sadly, my beloved grandfather suddenly passed away the week of the Israeli pre-selection competition, which gave the lyrics of 'Milim' a very personal and difficult meaning to me." The song lyrics seem to suggest that the person singing the song has been left alone while his or her loved one has left, perhaps permanently. Household items and architectural details are mentioned throughout the song—fallen ceiling, scratched handles, arranged books, and windows with cracked glass. The song contains the refrain, "Hish'art li rak milim" (English version: "You left me only words"), which is repeated throughout the chorus.

== Russian version ==
Слова остались мне (The words remained to me) is a song by Belarusian singer Eugene Litvinkovich, released in 2012 as a cover for "Milim". The Russian version of the song was firstly presented on Ukrainian TV series X-Factor at 6 October 2012. The author is Noam Horev, the interpreter - N. Dorofeeva. The song became first single from the debut album "Znaki Zodiaka". The song is about a girl which tries to forget the character of the song.

== See also ==
- Israel in the Eurovision Song Contest 2010
