= Gilad Segev =

Israeli singer-songwriter, musician, author and travel documentarian

Gilad Segev גלעד שגב
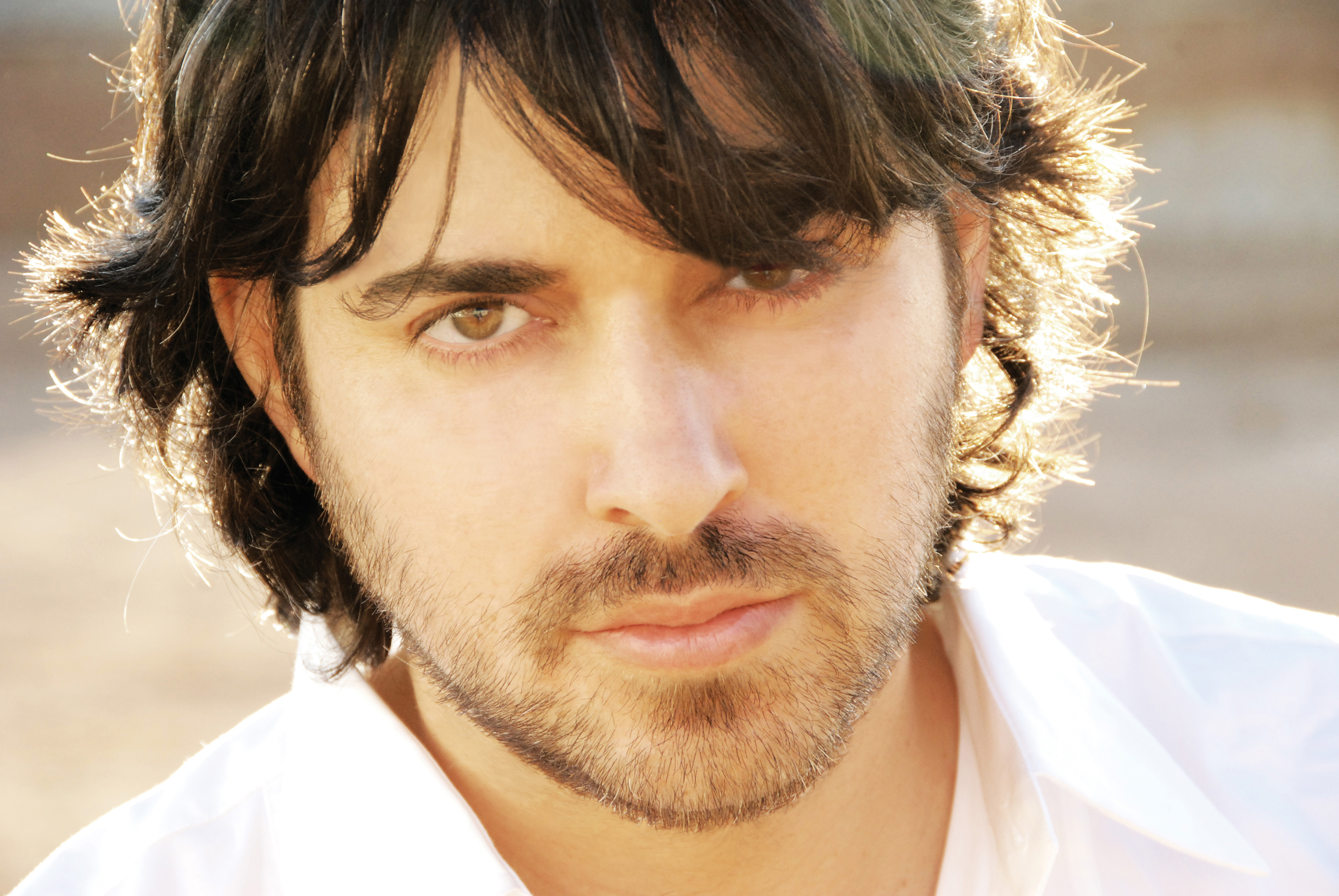
- Passerby (Musician)

Background information
- Also known as: Passerby
- Born: 16 November 1974 (age 51); Ramat Gan, Israel
- Genres: Folk, rock, world, pop, folk-pop
- Occupations: Singer-songwriter, musician, author
- Instruments: Guitar, piano, vocals
- Years active: Since 2000; 26 years ago
- Labels: Helicon, B2
- Website: passerby-music.com (in English)

Gilad Segev (Hebrew: גלעד שגב; born November 16, 1974), also known as Passerby or Gilad Passerby (in Chinese 行者.吉拉德), is an Israeli singer-songwriter, musician, author, and travel documentarian. He is best known for his hit songs "Achshav Tov" ("It's Good Now"), "Isha M'hashamayim" ("Woman From The Sky"), and "Chana'leh Hitbalbelah" ("Hannah Was Confused").

In recent years, Segev gained success through his Passerby project, and toured the world collaborating with international artists. His Project 34 was popular in China: it highlights the music and traditions of China's 34 regions.

== Early life ==
Gilad Avraham Segev was born on November 16, 1974, in Ramat Gan, Israel, to a Syrian-Polish Jewish family. Growing up, his parents didn't talk much about their pasts as they embraced their new lives in Israel. This led Segev on a quest to learn and connect with his roots and "hidden identities" through music.

Segev started playing music at 11 years old. He studied at Tel Aviv University and graduated with a degree in Media and Management.

== Career ==
=== 2000-2008: Career beginnings and breakthrough ===
In 2000, Segev got his first big career break by writing the song "I Forgive" for the legendary American-Israeli singer Josie Katz, who is best known for forming the 1960s Israeli pop-rock band The High Windows with Arik Einstein and Shmulik Kraus.

Segev burst onto the music scene in 2004 with his first single, "Achshav Tov (It’s Good Now)." He wrote the song about his brother who died. The song tells the story of a day the two had spent together just weeks before his death. The song resonated with many Israelis and became a smash hit across the country, earning the title of the most broadcast song on Israeli radio that year. The hit single was then followed by the release of Segev's first album of the same name, which was produced by Gilad Shmueli and Ivri Lider. The album included other top singles including "Writing You a Story," which was used as the theme song for the Israeli television drama, Peach, which starred Orna Banai.

In 2006, Segev found success again with the release of his second album "The Love That Stays," also produced by Gilad Shmueli. The title track of the album rose to popularity as it was featured in Israeli telecommunications company HOT’s nationwide advertising campaign that year.

In 2007, Segev co-wrote the song "Let's Leave" with Elai Botner, which was performed by Ran Danker and Botner. The song would go on to become a big hit in Israel that year, winning "Song of the Year" at the 2007 Israeli Music Channel Awards.

=== 2009-2014: Finding his roots ===
After the release of his second album, Segev had "a revelation" and "locked" himself in isolation for three-and-a-half years. During this time, he studied the music, traditions, prayers, and instruments of Syria and Eastern Europe, the regions of the world where his parents originated from.

In 2009, the result of Segev's years in isolation would become his third – and most personal – album release yet, "Noadnu (We Were Meant to Be)." The album is widely regarded as "the first Polish-Syrian-Jewish-Israeli album" and ushered in a brand-new sound for Segev that serves as a dialogue between his two East and West identities.

The album was a big success and went on to achieve certified Gold record status. The album's hit song "Isha M'hashamayim (Woman From The Sky)" garnered millions of views on YouTube and became Israel's most broadcast song on the radio in 2009. This became the second hit song of Segev's to achieve this title. The headlining song on the album, also called "Noadnu," was a cover of the Swedish electronic-music band The Knife's song "Marble House."

Segev collaborated with Rising Star winner Roni Dalumi in 2010 to release her first single, "Ten (Give)." He wrote the song's lyrics, which were based on Gloria Estefan’s hit Spanish song "Hoy." The song has since become one of the most played songs of the decade in Israel.

In 2011, Segev collaborated with the Madboojah Project. He performed Nathan Alterman's "Chana'leh Hitbalbelah," which became the fourth most-played song on Israeli radio that year. Over the next two years, Segev would also serve on the selection committee for Israel's entry to the Eurovision Song Contest.

In 2012, Segev released the single "Holy Day," which would go on to break the record for most plays in a week on Israeli radio. The music video for "Holy Day" was shot in Los Angeles by famed music video director Lior Molcho, in collaboration with American production teams that have worked with the likes of Taylor Swift, Missy Elliott, Gwen Stefani, and Lil Wayne.

Later in 2012, Segev released his fourth album "Voices of the Heart." The album's title song of the same name was a popular duet with Israeli singer Miri Mesika. By 2013, "Voices of the Heart" had achieved certified Gold status.

In 2013, Segev began traveling around the world to headline and perform his "roots experience" concert in high-profile festivals and events, including the One World Festival. He also headlined and performed in front of an audience of 200,000 people at the Celebrate Israel Festival in New York. In July 2014, he performed in front of tens of thousands of people on the main stage at the popular Zebra Music Festival in Shanghai, China.

=== 2015-present: Passerby ===
In 2015, Segev began his work on the Passerby project, where he partners with different artists all around the world.

Segev briefly relocated to New York and began working with singer-songwriter Jack Knight and producer Roahn Hylton to promote peace. In May 2015, they released the first song of the Passerby era, "Steel", in Hebrew and English. Shortly thereafter, Segev released his fifth album, A Time to Change. In 2016, Segev signed "Passerby" in the United States with Aida Gurwicz.

Over the next five years, his musical work through Passerby included collaborations and tours with artists including Sterling Crew, Havana D'Primera, and Yemen Blues’ Ravid Kahalani. Passerby and Kahalani's song, "Gold Rush," was released in 2018.

Segev has often acknowledged his special connection with China. He started the first of his numerous Passerby tours across China in 2015, when he was invited as the main speaker at the China-Israel Business Conference. In 2016, he returned to headline the Chengdu China World Music Festival. As his popularity began to rise across the region, he created a Weibo account to connect with his Chinese fans and followers. He has since received over a million followers on his Chinese social media pages.

In 2019, Segev set out on a successful multi-media Passerby tour across mainland China, including cities like Shanghai, Beijing, Xi'an, Chengdu, and Nanjing. In March 2020, he released a duet in English and Chinese with Chinese singer Ha Hui called "Be There." The song, which was a tribute to the medical workers of Wuhan during the COVID-19 pandemic, was recorded and filmed while in quarantine and became a huge hit, accumulating millions of views and shares across the region. "Be There" was also performed nationwide on CCTV and on billboard screens in Times Square in New York.

In June 2020, Segev announced the launch of "Project 34," a musical journey that focuses on the people, landscape, heritage, and indigenous sounds throughout China. For 34 months, Passerby released a new Folk song and accompanying music video for each of China's 34 provinces, autonomous regions, municipalities, and special administrative regions. As part of the project, Segev has also collaborated with artists who are representative of each region as they create an experience together that showcases "the magical Chinese energy that endured for thousands of years."

In 2022, Segev was one of the international musical artists featured in the official song of the 2022 Winter Olympics. Later that year, Segev collaborated with Canadian-Indigenous music collective Indian City. Together, they were the headlining performers of the Tarbut Festival in Winnipeg, Canada. Shortly thereafter, Segev was the headlining performer at the celebration of the 70th anniversary of diplomatic relations between Japan and Israel. During this performance, Japan's Minister for Foreign Affairs, Yoshimasa Hayashi, notably joined Segev on stage to play the guitar alongside him as a gesture to show how close the friendship is between the two nations. In January 2023, Segev released a multilingual song with Chinese opera singer Liang Ning to celebrate China-Israel relations.

=== Publications and upcoming projects ===
Segev released his first Passerby book in 2018, titled Quotes for the Traveler Through Life. The book, which was accompanied by a musical album of his worldly encounters, became a best-seller in Israel and has since been translated into 10 languages. The book's sequel, by the same name, was released in 2020.

Segev has been in production on the travel documentary television series for Passerby. Each episode follows Segev on a quest to explore different regions of the world, while surrounded by breathtaking landscape views and encounters with the local culture, heritage, and people.

=== Project Heroes ===
In the aftermath of the attacks on October 7, 2023, Gilad Segev initiated Project Heroes to honor the bravery and resilience of Jewish heroes throughout history. He collaborated closely with the families of those who lost their lives to ensure their stories were being told authentically, emphasizing that it is not about portraying those who died as victims, but as heroes. In an interview with CBS, Segev said that Project Heroes was born out of a desire to provide hope and inspiration in the face of tragedy, offering audiences a powerful narrative of courage and unity.

Segev's Heroes Concert Tour has brought this initiative to audiences across North America and Israel, blending music with multimedia presentations that feature the stories of these heroes. The concerts feature a blend of recorded and live music, music videos, and documentary scenes, presented in both English and Hebrew with subtitles. The tour has gained attention for using music as a medium to bridge past and present. All profits from the tour are being donated to Gaza border communities and others impacted by the Hamas attacks.

== Personal life ==
Segev married Israeli model Shachar Buchnik in October 2018. In 2020, they welcomed their first child.

== Discography ==
=== Albums ===
- 2004: Achsav Tov (עכשיו טוב)
- 2006: האהבה נשארת
- 2009: Noadno (נועדנו)
- 2013: Kolot Halev (קולות הלב)

=== Singles ===
- 2004: "Achsav Tov"
- 2009: "אשה מהשמיים" ("A Woman from the Sky")
- 2012: "Holy Day" (יום קדוש)
- 2020: "Be There"

== See also ==
- List of Israelis
- List of singer-songwriters
- Music of Israel
