= Balzac discography =

- Studio albums: 13
- Live albums: 2
- Compilation albums: 15
- Singles: 22
- Video albums: 41
- Music videos: 13
- Box sets: 11
- Demos: 6
- Mini: 3
- Other appearances: 41

The discography of Balzac, a horror punk band formed in Osaka, Japan in 1992, consists of the numerous releases the band has made through their years in existence. The band has gained some recognition for their non-stop flurry of releases of videos, singles and numerous appearances on tribute albums and compilations.

Balzac was founded by singer and songwriter Hirosuke Nishiyama, remaining the only constant member on the band since its creation. The first demos of the band were self-released under their own label called Evilegend Thirteen. In 1995 they signed to Alchemy Records where they only had one release, their first full length-album, The Last Men On Earth. Afterward, the band signed with Diwphalanx Records, a small but recognized music label in the Japanese indie scene. All later Japanese releases of the band from that point would be on either Diwphalanx or Evilegend Thirteen.

Internationally, the band is signed to The Misfits label, Misfits Records for their releases in the US. They first signed to G-Force Records for Europe and released one album under the label before changing to Gan-Shin Records, an important Germany-based record label specializing in Japanese rock bands.

== Studio albums ==
Year	Album details
1995	The Last Men On Earth: Released: 1995-10-31; Label: Alchemy (ARCD-079); Format: CD; 1st Album
1997	Deep – Teenagers from Outer Space: Released: 1997-10-31; Label: Diwphalanx (PX-016); Format: CD, LP; 2nd Album
1998	13 Stairway – The Children of the Night: Released: 1998-10-31; Label: Diwphalanx (PX-025); Format: CD, LP; 3rd Album
2000	Zennou-Naru Musuu-No Me Ha Shi Wo Yubi Sasu: Released: 2000-12-01; Label: Diwphalanx (PX-056); Format: CD, LP, CS; 4th Album
2002	Terrifying! Art of Dying – The Last Men On Earth II: Released: 2002-04-03; Label: Diwphalanx (PX-076/PX-077); Format: CD, LP; 5th Album
2004	Came Out of the Grave: Released: 2004-01-28; Label: Diwphalanx (PX-113); Format: CD, 2x10", LP (Germany); 6th Album
2005	Dark-Ism: Released: 2005-02-25; Label: Diwphalanx (PX-125); Format: CD, LP; Mini Album
2006	Deep Blue: Chaos from Darkism II: Released: March 2006-03-08; Label: Diwphalanx (PX-142); Format: CD; 7th Album
2008	Hatred: Destruction = Construction: Released: 2008-04-11; Label: Diwphalanx (PX-176); Format: CD; 8th Album
2009	Paradox: Released: 2009–10; Label: Diwphalanx (PX-195); Format: CD, 12" (USA); Mini Album
2010	Judgement Day: Released: 2010-10-06; Label: Diwphalanx (PX-216); Format: CD; 9th Album
2013	Blackout: Released: 2013-03-08; Label: Diwphalanx (PX-258); Format: CD; 10th Album
2015	Bloodsucker: Released: 2015-07-07; Label: Diwphalanx (PX-290); Format: CD; 11th Album
2015	Bloodsucker Returns: Released: 2015-12-26; Label: Evilegend 13 (EVCD-126); Format: CD; Mini Album
2019	Hybrid Black: Released: 2019-01-23; Label: Diwphalanx (PX-341); Format: CD; 12th Album
2025	Evil Legend Thirteen: Released: 2025-03-19; Label: Diwphalanx (PX-383); Format: CD; 13th Album

== Compilation albums ==
Year	Album details
1998	The 4 Brothers Meet Misery Skull: Released: 1998; Label: Evilegend; Format: CD
2003	Out of the Light of the 13 Dark Night: Released: 2003; Label: G-Force (EVCD-138); Format: CD, LP
2003	Beyond the Darkness: Released: 2003; Label: Misfits (RCD 10644); Format: CD
2005	Out of the Grave and into the Dark: Released: 2005; Label: Misfits (RCD 10816); Format: CD
2006	Paranoid Dream of the Zodiac: Released: 2006; Label: Gan-Shin (GSCD-028); Format: CD
2007	Deep Blue: Chaos from Darkism: Released: 2007; Label: Misfits; Format: CD
2008	The Birth of Evil: Released: 2008; Label: Diwphalanx (PX-183); Format: CD

== Live albums ==
Year	Album details
2005	Live at O-East 20040305: Released: 2005 (PX-128); Label: Diwphalanx; Formats: CD
2005	Liquid Room 20050403 Official Bootleg: Released: 2005; Label: Diwphalanx; Formats: CD

== Singles ==
Year	Single
1993	"Lord of the Light and of the Darkness"
1995	"Atom Age Vampire in 308"
1996	"Isolation from No.13"
1996	"When the Fiendish Ghouls Night"
1999	"Into the Light of the 13 Dark Night"
1999	"Neat Neat Neat/The End of Century"
2000	"Hands of 9 Evils"
2001	"Nowhere #13/Tomorrow"
2001	"Unvarnished Facts"
2001	"The Silence of Crows/Vanishes in Oblivion"
2002	"Out of the Blue II"
2003	"Beware of Darkness"
2004	"Inside My Eyes" (Germany)
2004	"Gimme Some Truth"
2005	"D.a.r.k"
2005	"Horrorock/Rain"
2006	"Deep Blue/Alone" (USA)
2007	"Balzac/Zodiac"
2007	"Swallow the Dark"
2011	"Deranged"
2012	"Bleeding Black"
2014	"Wonderwall"
2016	"Ever Free From No. 9 Dream"
