= Deep Blue =

Deep Blue may refer to:

== People, figures, and characters ==
- Deep Blue (musician), electronic and drum and bass musician
- Deep Blue (DC Comics), a superhero in the post-Crisis DC Universe
- Deep Blue (Tokyo Mew Mew), a character from Tokyo Mew Mew manga comic and anime cartoon
- Deep Blue (great white shark), a large, 20 ft (6.1 m) long female great white shark observed in the Pacific Ocean

== Film ==
- Deep Blues: A Musical Pilgrimage to the Crossroads, a 1992 documentary film about Mississippi Delta blues music
- Deep Blue (2001 film), a film by Dwight H. Little
- Deep Blue (2003 film), a film using footage from The Blue Planet

== Music ==
- Deep Blue Organ Trio, a Chicago-based jazz organ trio

=== Albums ===
- Deep Blue (Louise Patricia Crane album), 2020
- Deep Blue (Parkway Drive album) (2010)
- Deep Blue (Mark Peters and Elliot Ireland album) (2015)
- Deep Blue (Peter Mulvey album) (1997)
- Deep Blue: Chaos from Darkism, a 2006 album by Balzac
- Deep Blue: Chaos from Darkism II, a 2006 album by Balzac
- The Deep Blue, a 2007 album by Charlotte Hatherley
- Deep Blue, a 2001 album by Keiko Matsui

=== Songs ===
- "Deep Blue" (song), a song by George Harrison
- "Deep Blue", a song by Ladytron from Velocifero
- "Deep Blue", a song by Angra from Holy Land
- "Deep Blue", a song by Arcade Fire from The Suburbs
- "Deep Blue", a song by Louise Patricia Crane from Deep Blue

== Other uses ==
- Deep Blue (chess computer), a chess-playing computer developed by IBM that defeated world champion Garry Kasparov in 1997
- Deep Blue (novel), a novel based on Doctor Who
- Deep Blue (video game), a 1989 underwater shooter video game
- Deep Blue, an institutional repository of the University of Michigan Library
- Deep Blue Aerospace, a Chinese rocket manufacturer

== See also ==
- Dark blue (disambiguation)
- Deep Blue Sea (disambiguation)
- Deep Blue Something, an American rock band
- Shades of blue
