= Beyond the Darkness (disambiguation) =

Beyond the Darkness is an album by Balzac.

Beyond the Darkness may also refer to:

- Beyond the Darkness (EP), a 2007 EP by Demonic Resurrection
- Beyond the Darkness (film), a 1979 Italian film by Joe D'Amato
- Beyond the Darkness (video game), a 2024 platformer video game by My Little Studio

== See also ==
- Beyond Darkness
