= Blue Sea =

Blue Sea may refer to:

- Blue Sea, Quebec, a municipality in Canada
- Blue Sea Lake, a lake in the municipalities of Blue Sea and Messines, Quebec, Canada
- Dead Kultuk, a bay of the Caspian Sea that was formerly referred to as "Blue Sea"

== See also ==
- Deep Blue Sea (disambiguation)
