= Headgear =

Any covering for the head; element of clothing which is worn on one's head

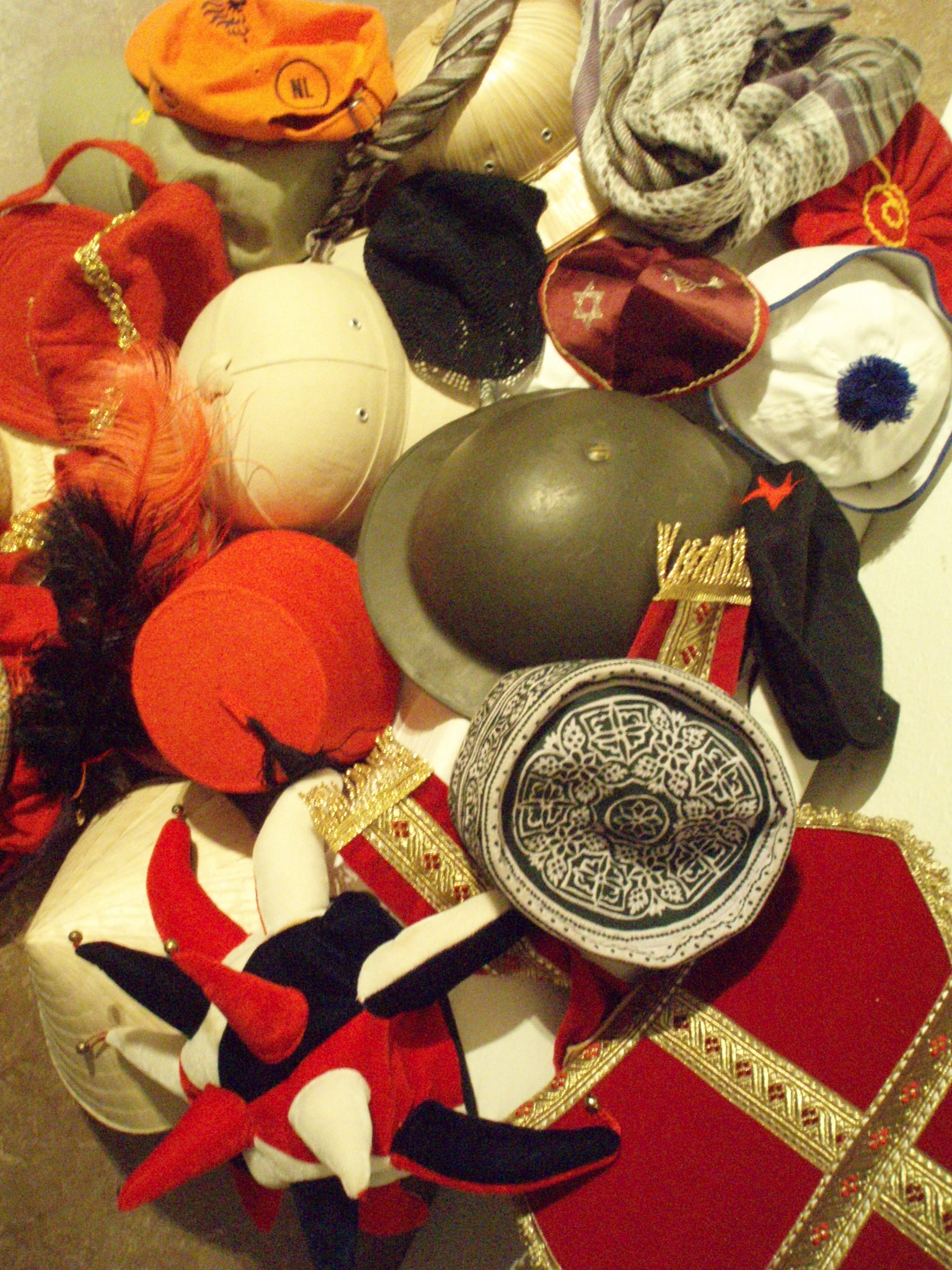
A collection of headgear

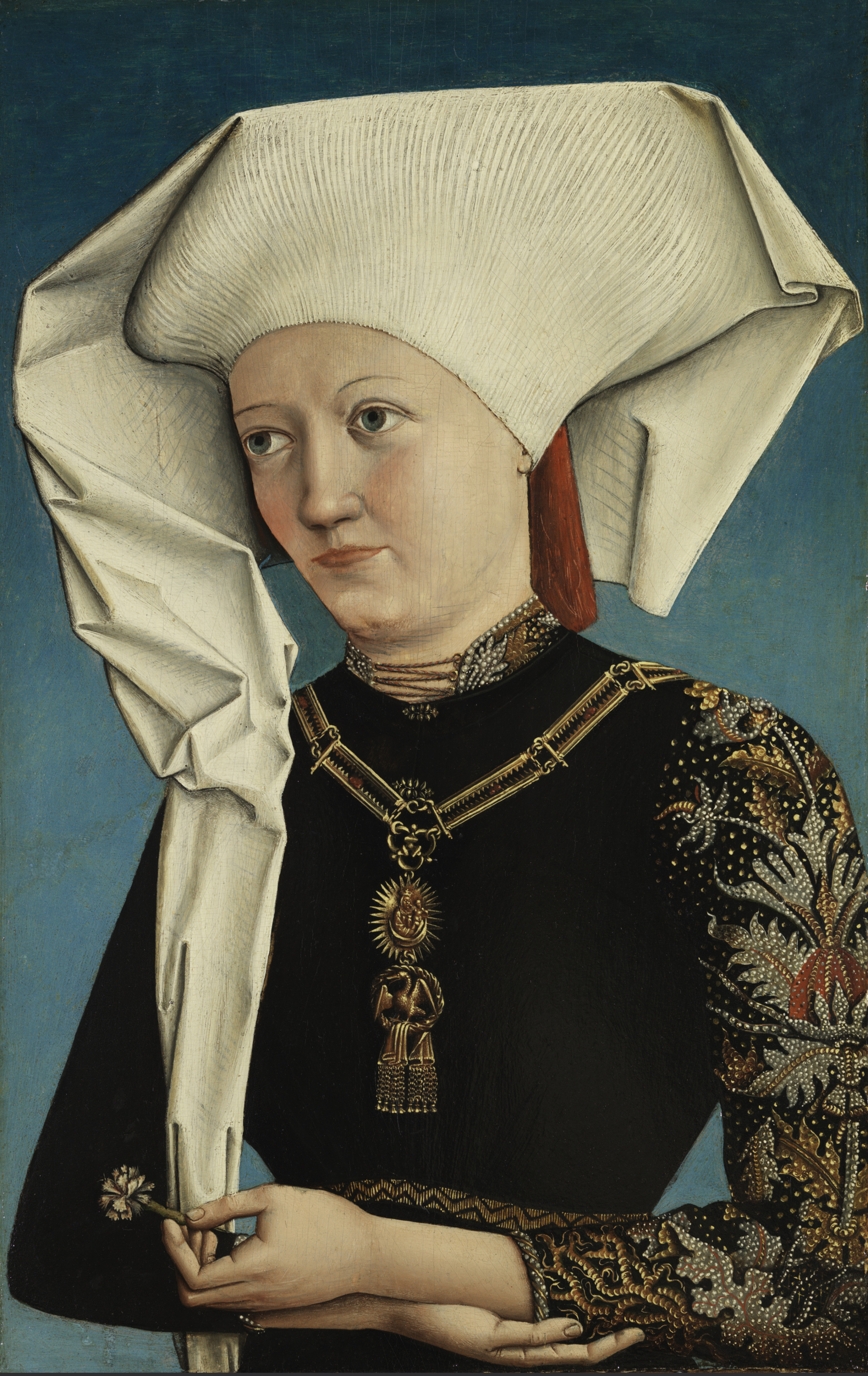
Portrait of a lady wearing the Order of the Swan

Headgear, headwear, or headdress is any element of clothing which is worn on one's head, including hats, helmets, turbans and many other types. Headgear is worn for many purposes, including protection against the elements, decoration, or for religious or cultural reasons, including social conventions.

== Purposes ==
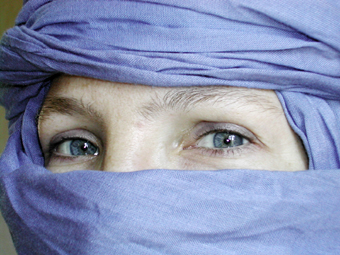
A cheche, worn in the Sahara as protection against wind and sand

=== Protection or defence ===
Headgear may be worn for protection against cold (such as the Canadian tuque), heat, rain and other precipitation, glare, sunburn, sunstroke, dust, contaminants, etc. Helmets are worn for protection in battle or against impact, for instance when riding bicycles or motor vehicles.

=== Fashion ===
Headgear can be an article of fashion, usually hats, caps or hoods. The formal man's black silk top hat was formerly an indispensable portion of the suit, and women's hats have, over the years, attained a fantastic number of shapes ranging from immense confections to no more than a few bits of cloth and decorations piled on top of the head. Some hats, such as Deep Blue Sea, are showpiece creations created more as works of art than as practical items of fashion, and may be worth thousands or millions of dollars.

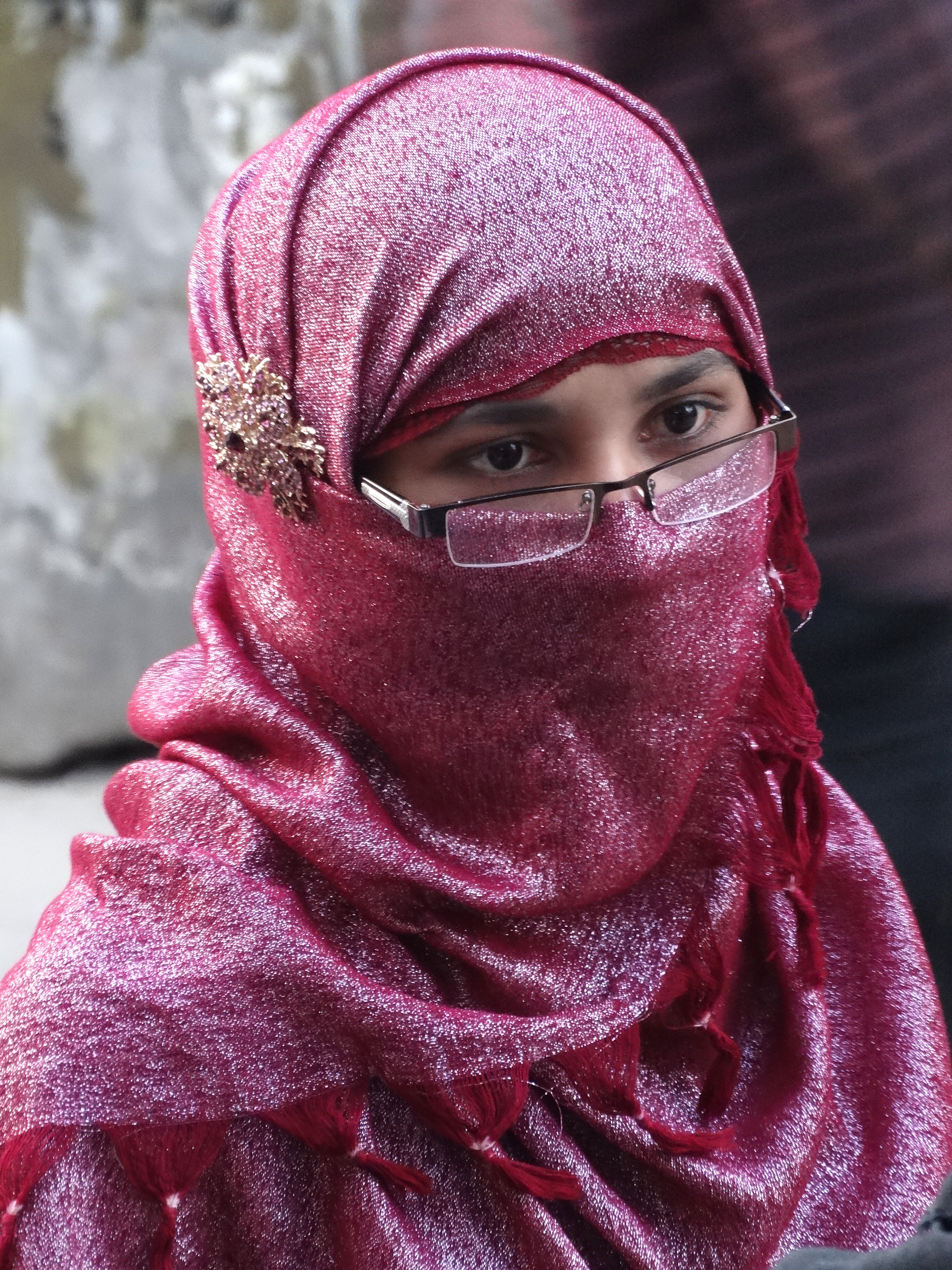
Woman in a niqāb, popular in the Levant region.

=== Religious significance ===
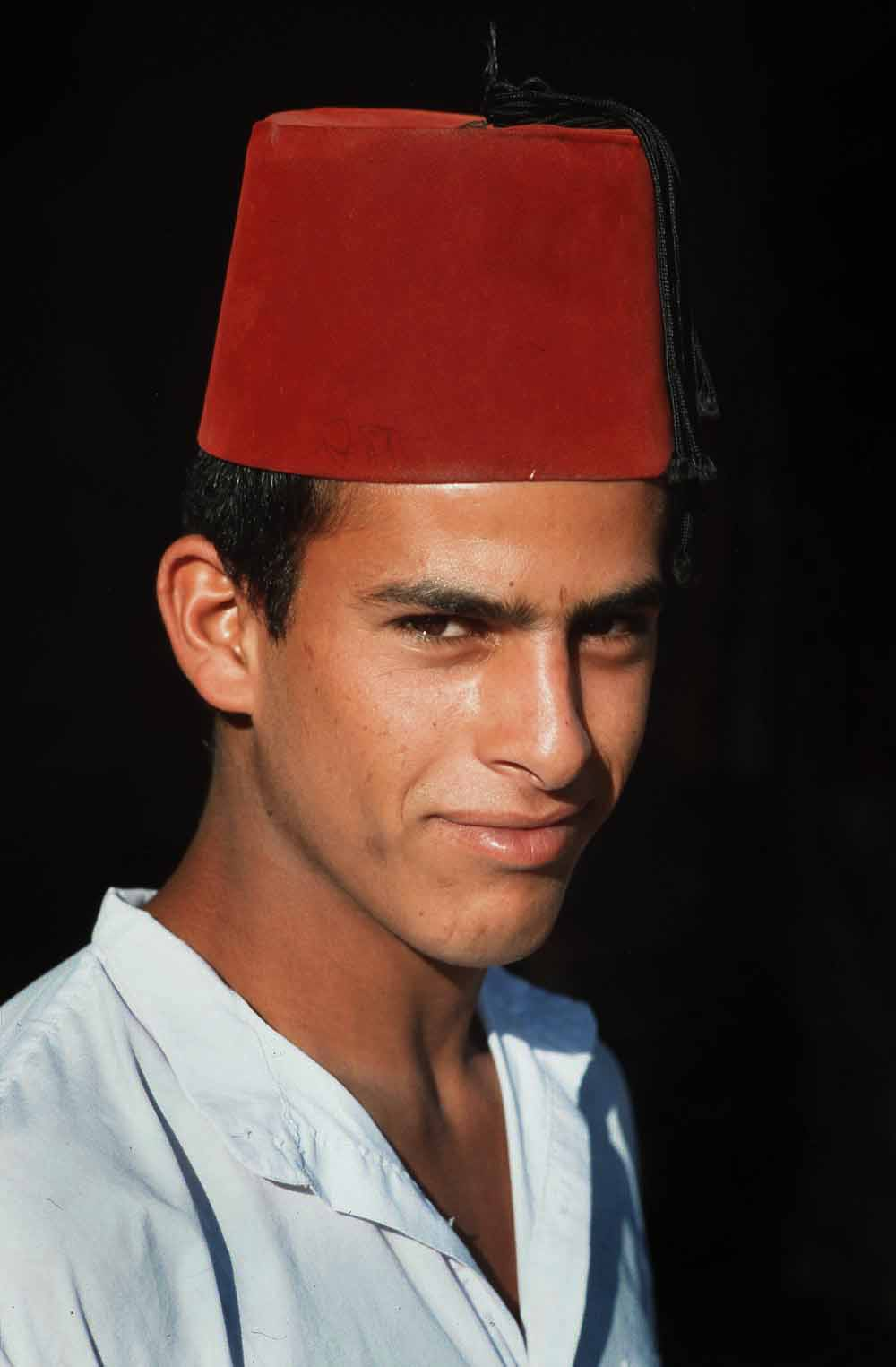
Young Bedouin man wearing a North African version of the fez.

Some headgear is worn for religious reasons.

In Judaism, men cover their heads out of reverence for God. Jewish religious headgear for men include small cloth skull-caps, called kippahs or yarmulkes. Some men wear them at all times, others only in the synagogue. In Orthodox and Hasidic Judaism, the kippah may also be additionally covered by hats such as fedoras or shtreimels. Traditional married Jewish women cover their hair in various ways, such as with headscarfs, called tichels, snoods, shpitzels or wigs, called "sheitels", according to the principles and halacha of tzniut.

Traditionally, Christian women are required to wear a headcovering as taught in 1 Corinthians 11:2–16 (the same text teaches that men are to pray and worship with their head uncovered), which has been practiced since the time of the early Church and continues to be observed universally in certain denominations, such as in Conservative Anabaptist churches. The style of the headcovering varies by region, though the early Church's Apostolic Tradition specifies that Christian headcovering is to be observed with an "opaque cloth, not with a veil of thin linen". With respect to Christian clergy, the zucchetto worn by Roman Catholic hierarchs is a skull-cap. Other forms of apostolic headgear include the mitre, biretta, tasselled cardinal's hat, and the papal tiara. Orthodox Christian clergy and monastics often wear a skufia, a kamilavkion, or a klobuk. The term red hat, when used within the Roman Catholic Church, refers to the appointment of a Cardinal, a senior "Prince of the Church", who is a member of the electoral college that chooses the Pope. On being appointed to the cardinalate, he is said to have received the red hat, or cardinal's biretta. In Lutheranism, many clergy wear the ruff and in Anglicanism, the Canterbury cap is popular among pastors.

Male Sikhs are required to wear turbans. Some Sikh women also wear a turban; however it is not a requirement for female Sikhs. Turbans are also worn by Muslims, especially Shia Muslims, who regard turban-wearing as Sunnah Mu'akkadah (confirmed tradition).

In Islam, the hijab, or headscarf, is worn by women because it is considered modest. Muslim men also sometimes wear a skullcap called a "kufi" or taqiyah (cap), especially during prayers. Headgear differs from culture to culture, and some Muslims' headgear is not related to their religion, such as the turbans worn in Saudi Arabia. The doppa, originating in the Caucasus, is worn by Kazan Tatars, Uzbeks and Uyghurs. Muslim men in Indonesia and Malaysia are often seen wearing a kopiah, but its use pre-dates the arrival of Islam in the region.

The black satin headgear called or known as "fenta" or "topi" is a pillbox-shaped skullcap, worn by Zoroastrians. It is considered by some in the Zoroastrian religion to be of vital spiritual importance. In earlier times, a saucer-shaped, red-and-white-striped kipah was the hallmark of the Zoroastrian.

Buddhist priests in China wear the bao-tzu (more commonly known as the mao-tzu, 帽子 Mandarin màozi), the classic skullcap that is the most like the Jewish tradition. In Japan, the cap is more in the form of a pillbox and is called the boshi (帽子). Though not of ecclesiastical significance, the Buddhist skullcap does denote something about the priest's standing in the community.

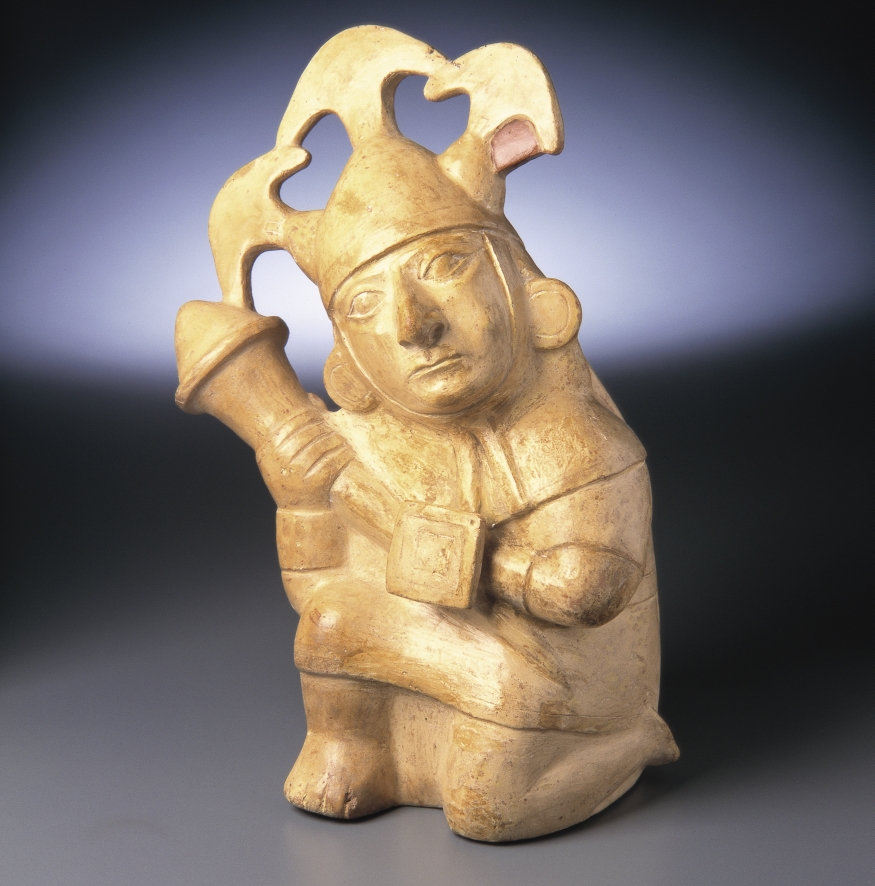
Moche ceramic vessel showing a warrior wearing headgear (Peru).

=== Symbol of status or office ===
Headgear such as crowns and tiaras are worn in recognition of noble status especially among royalty. Wigs are worn traditionally by judges and barristers of Commonwealth nations. Feathered headpieces, such as the war bonnet of Plains Indian cultures, are worn by various Native North American and South American indigenous peoples.

=== Other uses ===
Other purposes of headgear include:

- keeping hair contained or tidy (including scrunchies, ball caps, etc.)
- medical purposes, such as orthodontic headgear
- modesty or social convention
- sport uniform
- traditional ceremonies

== Types ==
=== Bonnets ===
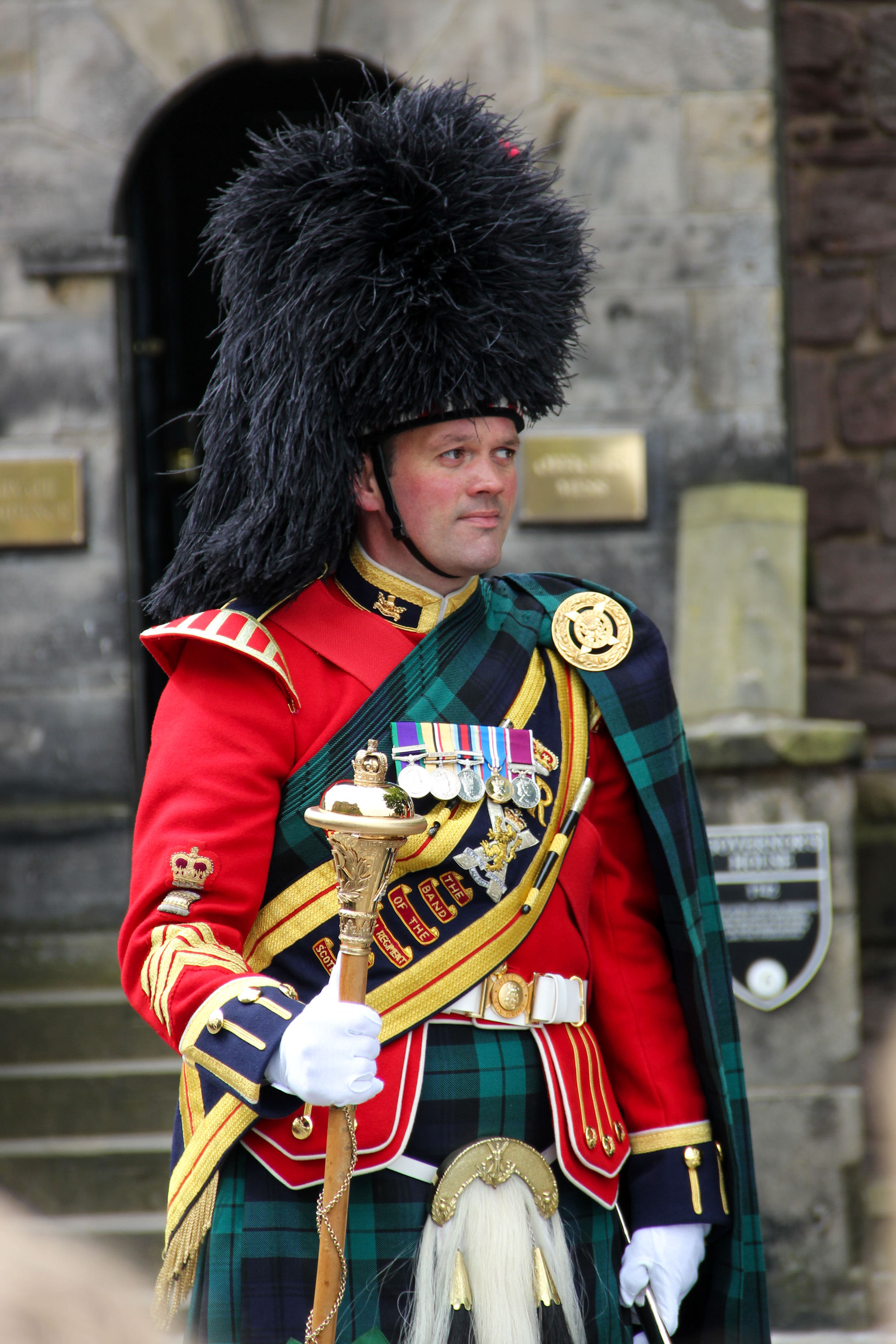
Drum major wearing a feather bonnet

Bonnets, as worn by women and girls, were hats worn outdoors which were secured by tying under the chin, and often which had some kind of peak or visor. Some styles of bonnets had peaks so large that they effectively prevented women from looking right or left without turning their heads. Bonnets worn by men and boys are generally distinguished from hats by being soft and having no brim—this usage is now rare (they would normally be called caps today, except in Scotland where the "bunnet" is common in both civilian life and in the Royal Regiment of Scotland).

=== Caps ===
Caps are generally soft and often have no brim or just a peak (like on a baseball cap). For many centuries women wore a variety of head-coverings which were called caps. For example, in the 18th and 19th centuries a cap was a kind of head covering made of a flimsy fabric such as muslin; it was worn indoors or under a bonnet by married women, or older unmarried women who were "on the shelf" (e.g. mob-cap). An ochipok is part of traditional Ukrainian costume.

=== Crowns ===
Some headgear, such as the crown, coronet, and tiara, have evolved into jewelry. These headgear are worn as a symbol of nobility or royal status. Kokoshnik is part of Russian traditional dress, often worn by nobility.

=== Fillets ===
A fillet or circlet is a round band worn around the head and over the hair. Elaborate and costly versions of these eventually evolved into crowns, but fillets could be made from woven bands of fabric, leather, beads or metal. Fillets are unisex, and are especially prevalent in archaic to Renaissance dress.

=== Hair covers ===
Hairnets are used to prevent loose hair from contaminating food or work areas. A snood is a net or fabric bag pinned or tied on at the back of a woman's head for holding the hair. Scarves are used to protect styled hair or keep it tidy. Shower caps and swim caps prevent hair from becoming wet or entangled during activity.

=== Hats ===
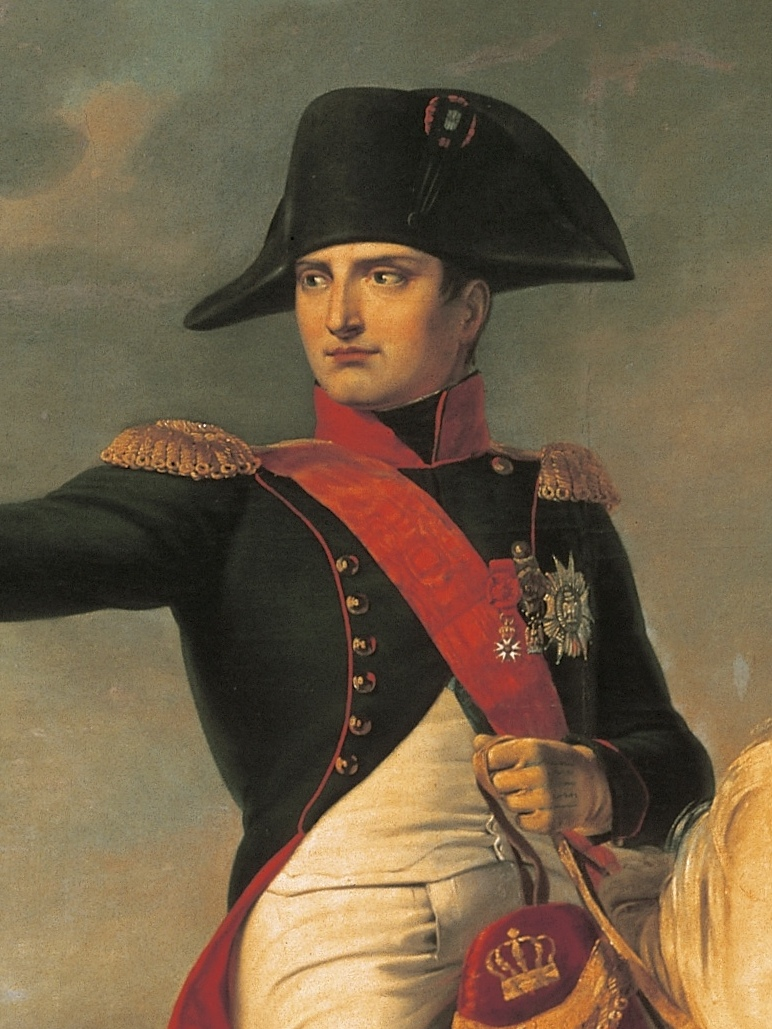
Napoléon Bonaparte in his familiar bicorne hat

Hats often have a brim all the way around the rim, and may be either placed on the head, or secured with hat-pins (which are pushed through the hat and the hair). Depending on the type of hat, they may be properly worn by men, by women or by both sexes.

=== Helmets ===
Helmets are designed to protect the head, and sometimes the neck, from injury. They are usually rigid, and offer protection from blows. Helmets are commonly worn in battle, on construction sites and in many contact sports (most commonly being associated with American football). In most of the United States they are required by law for anyone operating a range of vehicles including motorcycles, and sometimes extending to bicycles and skateboards.

=== Hoods ===
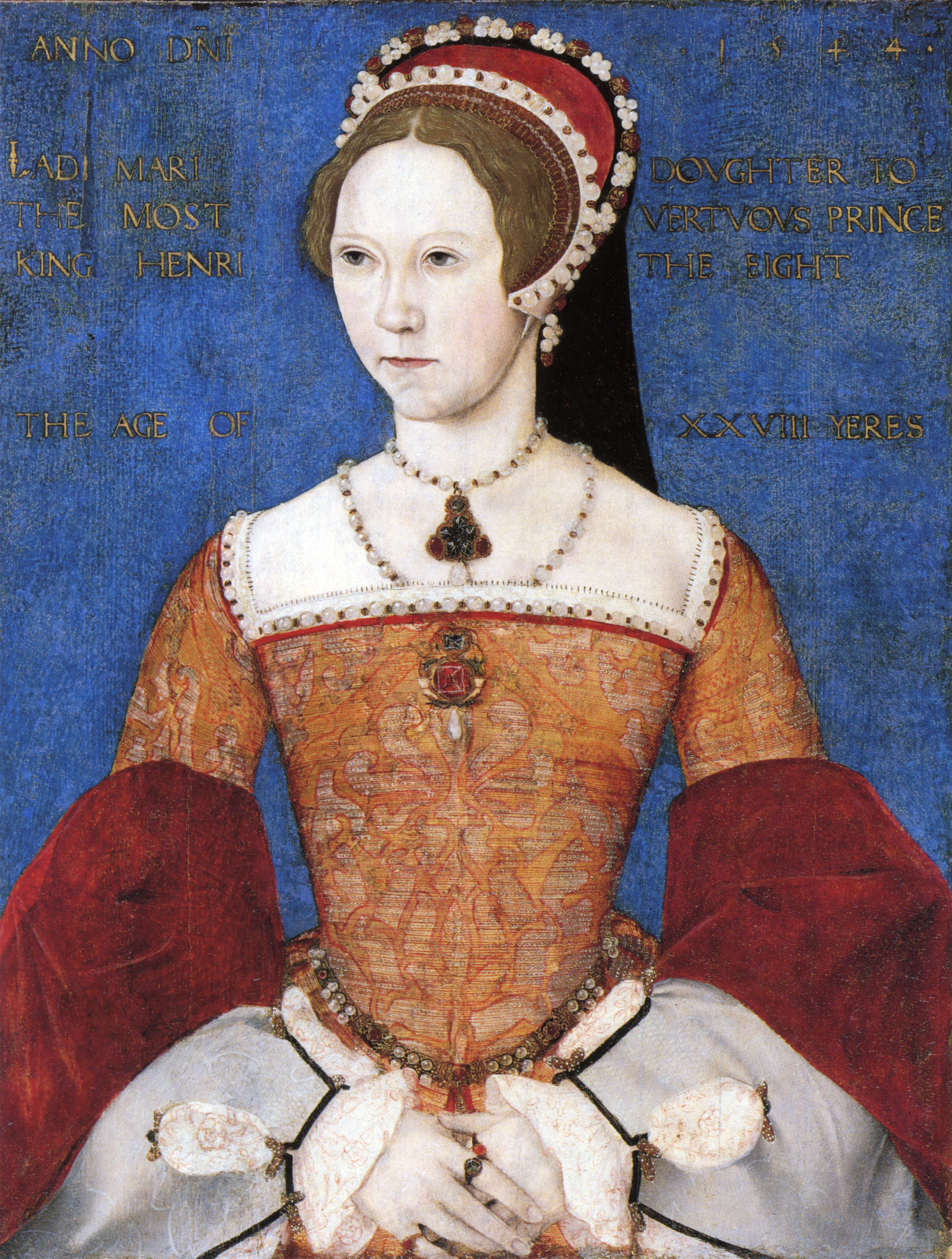
Queen Mary I of England wearing a French hood

Modern hoods are generally soft headcoverings which are an integral part of a larger garment, like an overcoat, shirt or cloak.

Historically, hoods were either similar to modern hoods, or a separate form of headgear. In medieval Europe hoods with short capes, called chaperons in French, were extremely common, and later evolved into elaborate and adaptable hats. Women's hoods varied from close-fitting, soft headgear to stiffened, structured hoods (e.g. gable hoods, hennins or French hoods) or very large coverings made of material over a frame which fashionable women wore over towering wigs or hairstyles to protect them from the elements (e.g. calash).

=== Masks ===
A mask is worn over part or all of the face, frequently to disguise the wearer, but sometimes to protect the face. Masks are often worn for pleasure to disguise the wearer at fancy dress parties, masked balls, during Halloween or other festivals, or as part of an artistic performance. They may also be worn by criminals to prevent recognition or as camouflage while they commit a crime. Masks which physically protect the wearer vary in design, from guard bars across the face in the case of ice hockey goalkeepers, to facial enclosures which purify or control the wearer's air supply, as in gas masks.

=== Orthodontic headgear ===
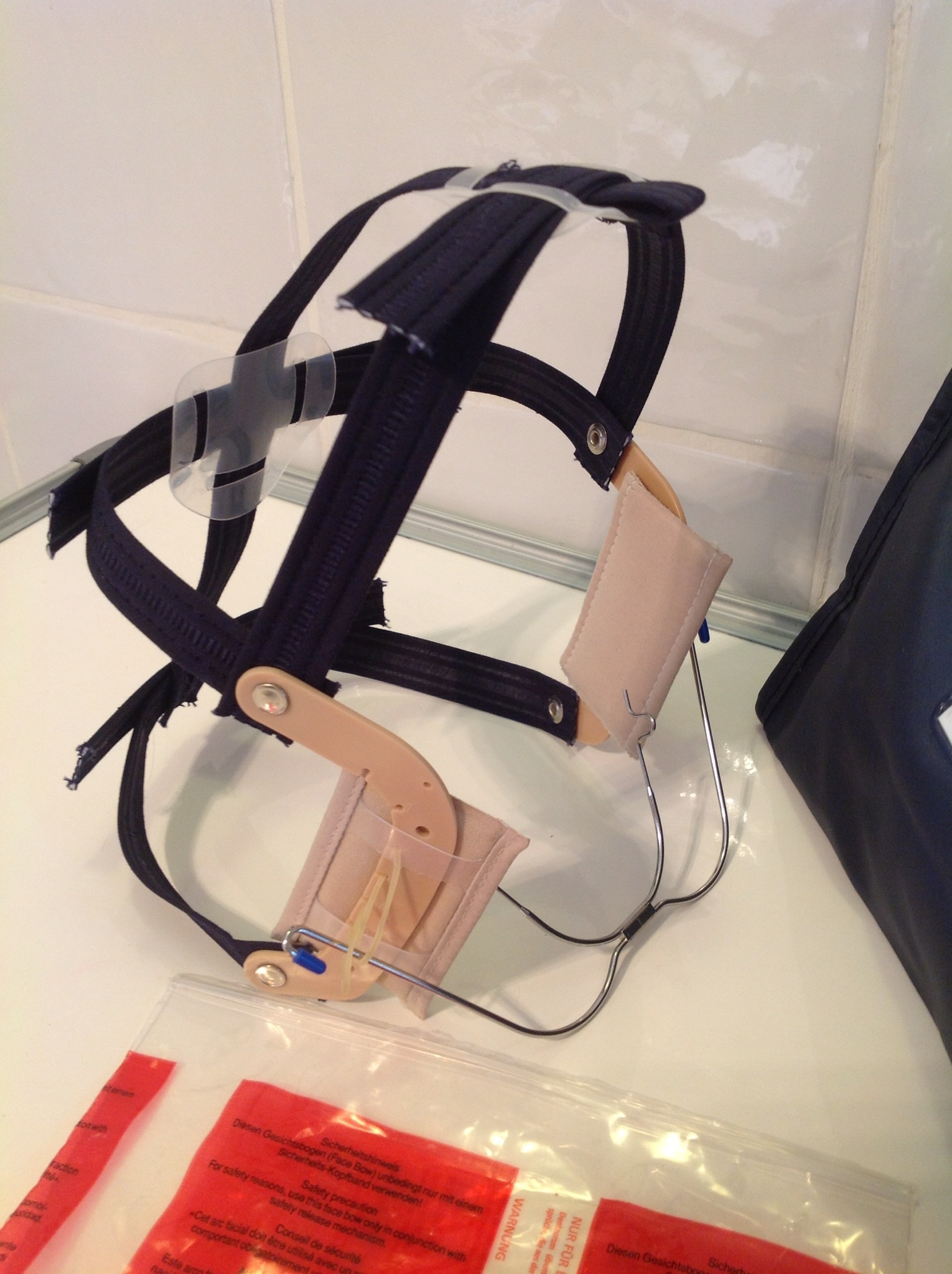
Full orthodontic headgear

Orthodontic headgear is used to control the growth of the maxillary and mandibular bones during orthodontic treatment. The most common treatment headgear is used to correct anteroposterior discrepancies. The headgear attaches to the braces via metal hooks or a facebow. Straps or a head cap anchor the headgear to the back of the head or neck. In some situations, both are used.

Elastic bands are used to apply pressure to the bow or hooks which is then transferred to the patients teeth and jaw. Its purpose is to slow or stop the upper jaw from growing, thereby preventing or correcting an overjet. Other forms of headgear treat reverse overjets, in which the top jaw is not forward enough.

=== Turbans ===
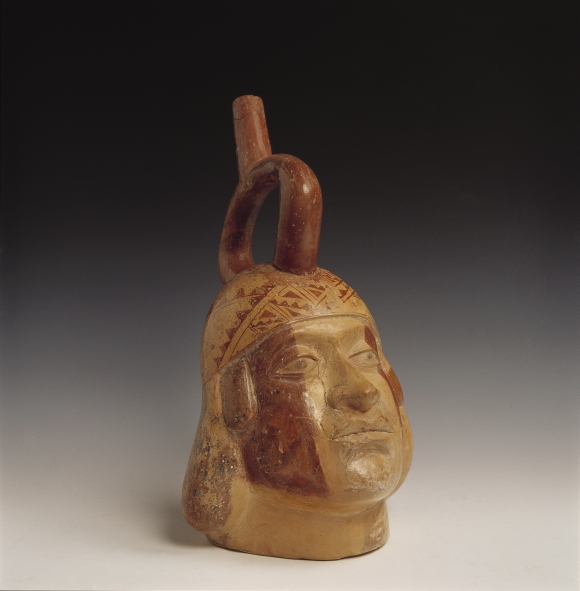
Moche ceramic vessel depicting a man wearing a turban. Larco Museum, Peru

Turbans are headgear, mostly for males, made up from a single piece of cloth which is wrapped around the head in a wide variety of styles. Turban is the best known word in English for a large category of headgear and general head wraps traditionally worn in many parts of the world. All over the world Sikhs wear a turban as religious headgear.

Turbans for women are a popular choice during chemotherapy treatment as an alternative to wigs, hats, headscarves and headbands. Sikh women also wear turbans as a religious practice. Turbans for women made in natural fabrics are both comfortable and functional. The Breast Cancer Care booklet, Breast Cancer and Hair Loss, suggests: "You may want to wear a soft hat or turban in bed to collect loose hairs."

=== Veils and head wraps ===
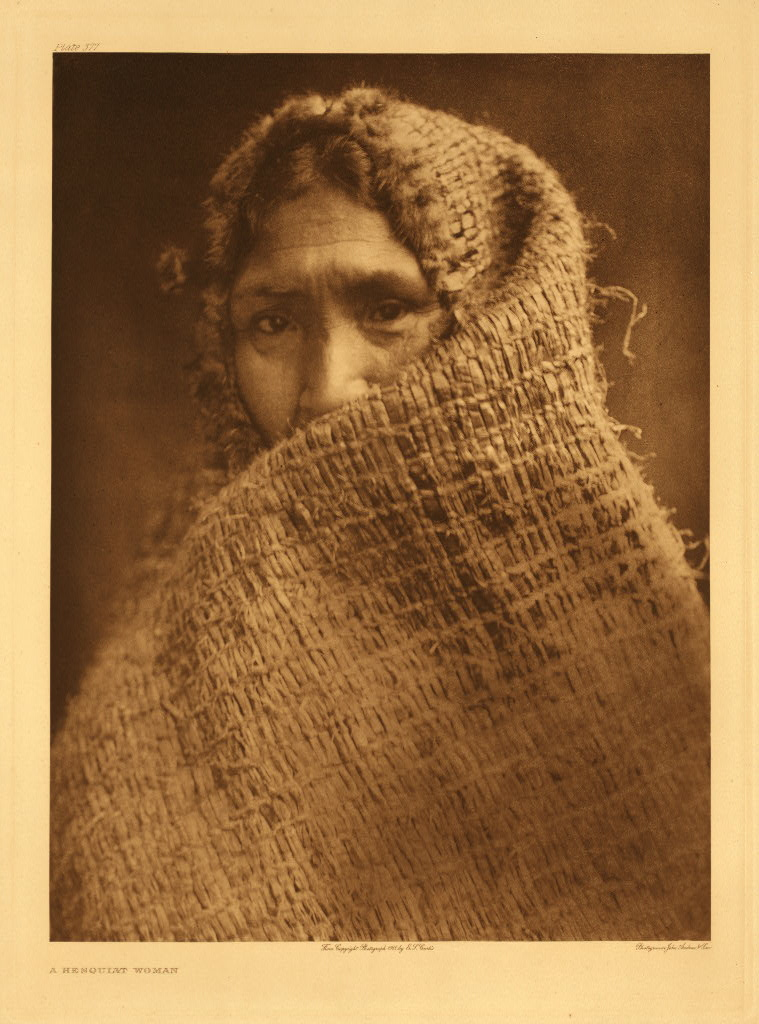
Hesquiat woman veiled in a shawl

A veil is a piece of sheer fabric that covers all or part of the face. For centuries women covered their hair, neck, ears, chin, and parts of the face with fabric. Each culture created elaborate head wraps for women and men using a shawl, headscarf, kerchief or veil. Very elaborate veiling practices are common in Islam, Africa and Eastern Europe. Women who do not cover their head on a regular basis, often use a veil in traditional wedding and funeral ceremonies.

=== Wigs ===
Wigs are headpieces made from natural or synthetic hair which may be worn to disguise baldness or thin hair, or as part of a costume. A toupee may be worn by a man to cover partial baldness. In most Commonwealth nations, special wigs are also worn by barristers, judges, and certain parliamentary officials as a symbol of the office.

=== Culture-specific types ===
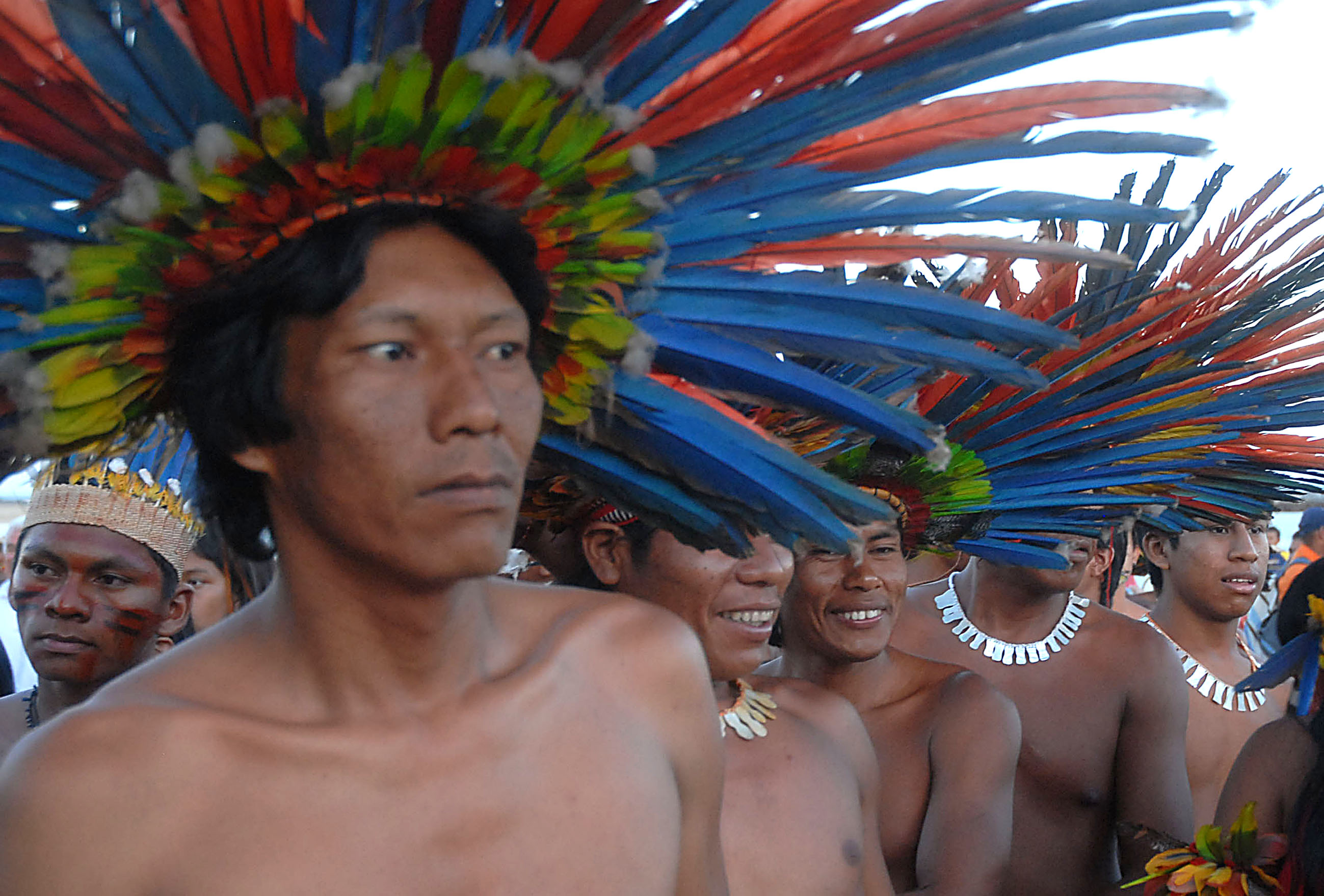
Bororo Indian men, Mato Grosso, Brazil

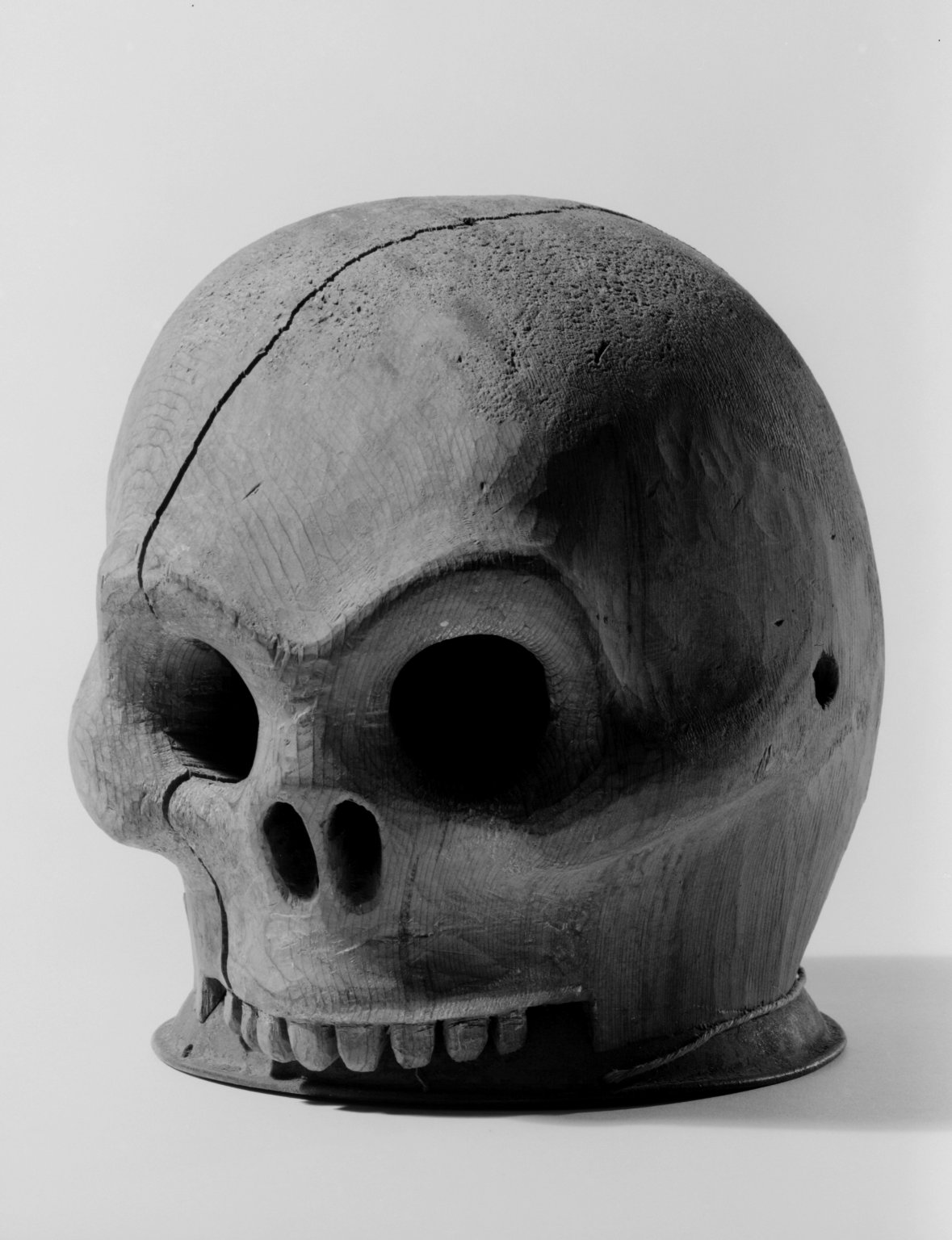
Tsimshian (Native American) Wooden Skull Headdress, late 19th century

==== Dhari ====
The dhari, also spelt dhoeri, is a distinctive headdress worn by men of the Torres Strait Islands, which lie in the Torres Strait between Australia and Papua New Guinea, for dance performances or cultural ceremonies. It is traditionally made with a pearl shell or turtle shell in the middle and decorated with white feathers, traditionally from the frigate bird or Torres Strait pigeon, although now made with a variety of materials. The head is often shaken to produce a shimmering effect while dancing. Dhari, the word used in the eastern islands of the strait, is the Meriam Mir word for "headdress". In the central and western islands, it is known as dhoeri, in the Kala Lagaw Ya language of those islands.

The dhari is today a potent symbol for Torres Strait Islander people, and used in the Torres Strait Islander flag. Torres Strait Islander artists such as Alick Tipoti and Ken Thaiday Snr create dhari as artworks.

==== War bonnet ====
War bonnets, which usually include an array of feathers, are worn mostly by men in various Plains Indian cultures in the United States. They are linked to status, culture and ceremony, and have to be given as gifts as a mark of respect for the receiver.

== Etiquette ==
In the Western culture derived from Christian tradition, removing one's headgear is a sign of respect and deference. Men were formerly expected to remove (or at least ‘tip’) their hats when speaking to a social superior or a lady. Men's hats are removed in Church, and not removing them is usually frowned upon. Women, however, are required to wear a hat to cover the head in some churches based on 1 Corinthians 11:5.

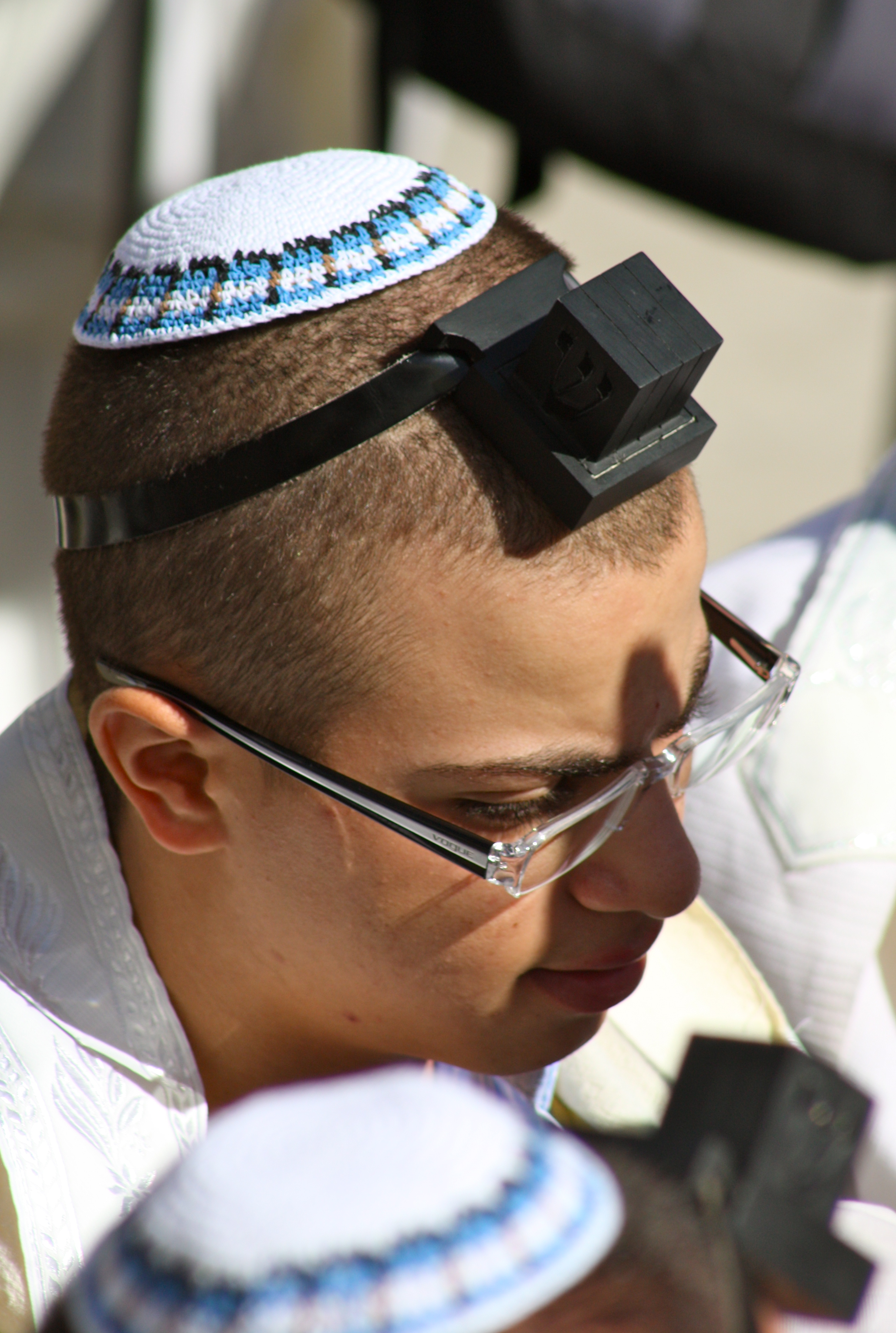
Man wearing a kippah and a head-tefillah

In the Jewish tradition, the converse idea equally shows respect for the superior authority of God. Wearing a kippah or yarmulke means the wearer is acknowledging the vast gulf of power, wisdom, and authority that separates God from mankind. It is a sign of humility to wear a yarmulke. Jews also may wear a fur hat or a black hat with a brim.

In Islamic etiquette, wearing headgear, traditionally the taqiyah (cap), is permissible while saying prayers at a mosque.

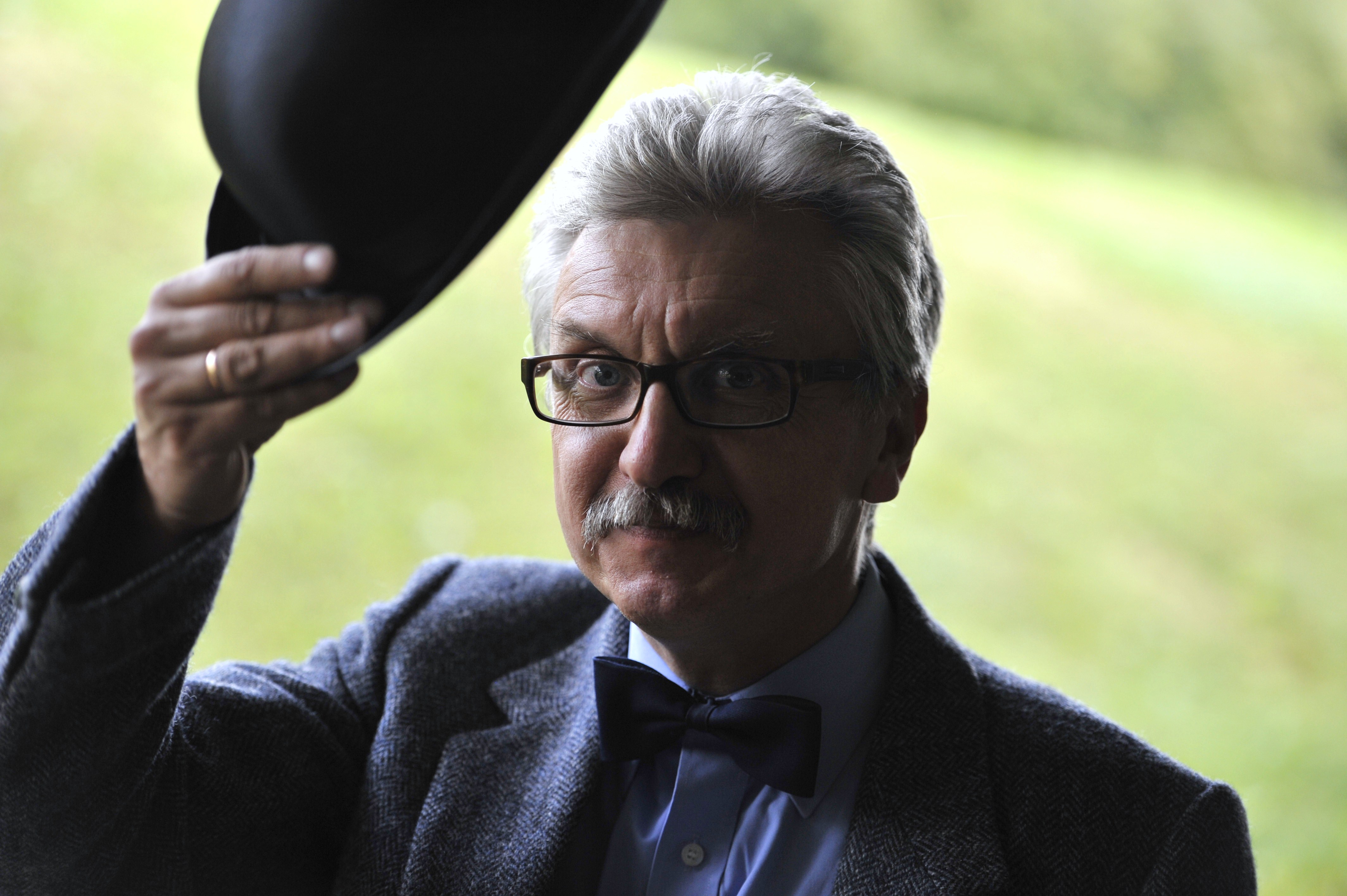
Hat tip

In the military, there are specific rules about when and where to wear a hat. Hats are generally worn outdoors only, at sea as well as on land; however, personnel carrying firearms typically also wear their hats indoors. Removing one's hat is also a form of salute. Many schools also have this rule due to the fact that many younger men tend to wear baseball caps and this being in relations to gangs depending on the side in which the hat is worn.

A hat can be raised (briefly removed and replaced, with either hand), or "tipped" (touched or tilted forward) as a greeting.

== See also ==
- List of headgear
- List of hat styles
- Chapeaugraphy—an act in which a ring of felt is shaped to resemble many hat types
- Mathabana
