= Out of the Light of the 13 Dark Night =

Out Of The Light Of The 13 Dark Night

Compilation album by Balzac
- Released: 22 September 2003
- Genre: Horror punk
- Length: 58:14 min
- Label: G-Force Records
- Producer: Balzac

Balzac chronology
Beyond The Darkness (2003)	Out Of The Light Of The 13 Dark Night (2003)	Came Out Of The Grave (2004)

Out Of The Light Of The 13 Dark Night is the first official full-length album released in Europe by the Japanese horror punk band Balzac. It consists of re-recordings of previously released songs by the band and has been considered a compilation album, properly introducing Balzac to the continent. The album was released a few months after Beyond The Darkness, a similar compilation released in America on Misfits Records.

== Track listing ==
1. "Thirteen"
2. "Into The Light of the 13 Dark Night"
3. "Nowhere #13"
4. "Tomorrow"
5. "Day The Earth Caught Fire"
6. "Wall"
7. "The Pain(is all around)"
8. "Yami-no-mukou-no-subete-wo"
9. "Out of the Blue II"
10. "In Your Face"
11. "The Silence of Crows"
12. "A Day in the Darkness"
13. "The End of Century"
14. "Violent Paradise"
15. "Monster II"
16. "Beware of Darkness"
17. "The Bleeding Light"

== Credits ==
- Hirosuke - vocals
- Atsushi - Guitar, vocals, chorus
- Akio - bass guitar, chorus
- Takayuki - drums, chorus
