= Dark blue =

Dark blue can refer to:

- Dark blue (color), a variant of the color blue
- Dark Blue (film), a 2002 film directed by Ron Shelton and starring Kurt Russell
- "Dark Blue" (song), a song by the American piano rock band Jack's Mannequin
- Dark Blue (TV series), a 2009 TV series on TNT
- Dark Blue, the original name of the supergroup Dark New Day
- "Dark Blue" (Voltron Force), the ninth episode of the 2011 television series
- "Dark Blue", a song by No Doubt from the 2000 album Return of Saturn
- The Dark Blue, a 19th-century literary magazine

== See also ==
- Deep Blue (disambiguation)
