= Between the Devil and the Deep Blue Sea =

"Between the devil and the deep blue sea" is an idiom meaning a dilemma.

Between the Devil and the Deep Blue Sea may also refer to:

- Between the Devil and the Deep Sea. A Dash by Plane to Seething Morocco, a 1924 book by Knud Holmboe
- "Between the Devil and the Deep Blue Sea" (song), a 1931 popular song by Harold Arlen and Ted Koehler
- Between the Devil and the Deep Blue Sea (film), a 1995 Belgian-French drama film directed by Marion Hänsel
- Between the Devil and the Deep Blue Sea (The Generators album), 2009
- Between the Devil & the Deep Blue Sea (Black Stone Cherry album), 2011
- Between the Devil and the Deep Blue Sea (novel), a young adult novel by April Genevieve Tucholke, 2013

== See also ==
- Deep Blue Sea (disambiguation)
