= Deep Blue: Chaos from Darkism II =

Studio album by Balzac
- Released: March 8, 2006
- Genre: Horror punk
- Label: Diwphalanx Records

Balzac chronology
Out Of The Grave And Into The Dark (2005)	Deep Blue: Chaos from Darkism II (2006)	Paranoid Dream of the Zodiac (2007)

Deep Blue: Chaos from Darkism II is an album by the band Balzac. One of the songs, "XXXxxx", is originally from their 2005 album Dark-Ism, and the track "D.A.R.K." is a re-mix of a song of the same name. It also features a cover version of David Bowie's "Ziggy Stardust".

The record has six different pieces of album art, and a limited number (1,000) of Deep Blue were supplied with a Skull-Bat figure. An even more limited number (308) of the Skull-Bat figures are red.

== Track listing ==
1. "I Bring Death and Confrontation"
2. "Godless"
3. "The Scare"
4. "In Those Days"
5. "D.A.R.K."
6. "Horrorock"
7. "Ziggy Stardust"
8. "The Gaze"
9. "(#2)"
10. "Deep Blue"
11. "Japanese Chaos"
12. "XXXxxx"
13. "(#1)"
14. "Japanese Trash"
15. "I Can't Stand it Anymore"
16. "I'm Alone"
