= Deep Blue Sea =

Deep Blue Sea or The Deep Blue Sea may refer to:

- The Deep Blue Sea (play), a 1952 stage play by Terence Rattigan
  - The Deep Blue Sea (Sunday Night Theatre), a 1954 British television play based on the Rattigan play
  - The Deep Blue Sea (1955 film), a British drama based on the Rattigan play
  - The Deep Blue Sea (2011 film), a British drama based on the Rattigan play
- Deep Blue Sea (1999 film), a 1999 American science fiction horror film
  - Deep Blue Sea (soundtrack), soundtrack to the film
  - Deep Blue Sea 2, a 2018 sequel to the 1999 film
  - Deep Blue Sea 3, the 2020 final installment in the series
- Deep Blue Sea, a 2004 album by Davy Spillane
- "Deep Blue Sea", a 1957 country and western hit song for Jimmy Dean with lyrics by Martin Seligson
- Deep Blue Sea (hat), an Australian hat

== See also ==
- Between the Devil and the Deep Blue Sea (disambiguation)
- Deep Blue (disambiguation)
- Sea (disambiguation)
- Blue Sea (disambiguation)
- Deep sea
