= Hatred: Destruction = Construction =

Studio album by Balzac
- Released: 2008
- Genre: Horror punk
- Length: 53:34 min
- Label: Diwphalanx Records, Gan-Shin Records
- Producer: Balzac

Balzac chronology
Deep Blue: Chaos from Darkism (2007)	Hatred: Destruction = Construction (2008)	The Birth of Evil (2008)

Hatred: Destruction = Construction is the eighth full-length album released by the Japanese horror punk band Balzac. It was released in 2008, with four different covers and one special 666mm edition. The album has two hidden tracks. The first is "Tomorrow Never Comes" and starts at the end of the song "Destruction = Construction" after a brief period of silence. When the final song of the albums ends, three other tracks on silence are played before the final song, "World Without Light", starts.

== Track listing ==
1. "The Shadow of Daybreak I"
2. "(半狂乱) Distraction "
3. "Swallow the Dark"
4. "Dakedo, Sonna Hibi-no Naka-de Boku-ha"
5. "Momentary Degeneration"
6. "Hurt"
7. "Paranoia"
8. "Frankenstein's Walk"
9. "Destruction = Construction"
10. "Justice, Pity and Hatred"
11. "The Howling Wolf"
12. "Pray"
13. "The Shadows of Daybreak II"

== Credits ==
- Hirosuke - vocals
- Atsushi - guitar, vocals, chorus
- Akio - bass guitar, chorus
- Takayuki - drums, chorus

== Additional recording members ==
- Ryan - sampled vocals
