= Beyond the Darkness (video game) =

2024 video game

Beyond The Darkness
- Developer: My Little Studio
- Publisher: IndieGO Publishing
- Platform: Windows
- Release: Windows; 04 November 2024
- Genres: Puzzle-platform, survival horror
- Mode: Single-player

Beyond the Darkness is a platformer video game with elements of quest and survival horror, developed by the Russian company My Little Studio. The game was released on November 14, 2024, for Windows.

== Plot ==
The story follows a girl named Millie. The player must help Millie escape from the world of memories, overcome nightmares, and find her parents. To do this, it is necessary to constantly maintain a sufficient level of light using a lamp given by her mother, solve puzzles, and master new mechanics in order to hide from terrifying figures and survive. During gameplay, Millie can learn new control elements, open doors, and charge silhouettes with energy, which can assist her. Millie has to face various enemies and nightmares, each of which requires a different approach (for example, some can be defeated using the lamp).

== Development ==
Beyond the Darkness is the debut project of the indie studio My Little Studio, founded in 2020, and it originated from a prototype horror game created in 2017. The game was released with the support of the publisher IndieGO Publishing. The Russian voice-over was produced by the GamsVoice team, with the main character Millie voiced by actress Varvara Sarantseva.

A demo version was released on October 29, 2024, and the game was launched on November 14 on Steam.

== Reception ==
iXBT.games notes that the game stands out with its original puzzles based on color manipulation and its atmospheric otherworldly level design, which creates a uniquely immersive environment. However, the implementation of enemies drew criticism: their behavior is irritating and poses no real threat. In addition, the plot is described as disjointed, and the ending contains an excess of shock content, which spoils the overall impression. As a result, the game received mixed reviews, with praise for its puzzles and atmosphere, but criticism directed at its enemies, storytelling, and short length.
