= Re-mix =

re-mix
- Developer(s): rubicon
- Stable release: 1.13.101 / April 11, 2011; 14 years ago
- Written in: C#
- Operating system: Windows
- Type: Mixin library
- License: LGPL 2.1 or higher
- Website: github.com/re-motion/Remix

re-mix is an open-source library (LGPL) to bring the mixin technology to C# and Visual Basic.NET.

== History ==
.NET does not offer multiple inheritance. Nevertheless, in some use cases multiple inheritance support would be helpful for .NET applications. In languages such as Ruby these use cases were solved with mixins.

The company rubicon created a mixin library for the Microsoft .NET Framework to add multiple inheritance to their own applications.

The mixin library became part of the open source framework re-motion. In March 2011, re-mix has been published on CodePlex as spin-off project of re-motion. It was later re-incorporated into re-motion after CodePlex was discontinued in 2017.
