= Deep Blue (video game) =

1989 video game

- North American box art
- Developer: Hi-Score Media Work
- Publishers: JP: Pack-In-Video; NA: NEC
- Designer: Itsuki Imazaki
- Artist: Yasuo Torai
- Platform: TurboGrafx-16
- Release: JP: 31 March 1989; NA: April 1990
- Genre: Scrolling shooter
- Mode: Single-player

Deep Blue (Note: Also known as Deep Blue: Undersea Myth (Japanese: ディープブルー・海底神話, Hepburn: Dīpu Burū: Kaitei Shinwa) in Japan.) is a 1989 horizontally scrolling shooter video game developed by Hi-Score Media Work and published by Pack-In-Video for the TurboGrafx-16. The player controls a submersible fighter shaped as a freshwater angelfish that must fight through waves of mutated marine life.

== Gameplay ==
Gameplay screenshot

Deep Blue is a basic horizontal scrolling shooter: players collect power-ups and different weapons to fight numerous enemies. The screen scales up and down allowing more vertical space.

The game features a single life; the Angel Fish can take a lot of hits before it is destroyed, and even regenerates over time. Damage levels are represented by the color of the ship's 'eyes': they start out a solid blue, but when damaged, the eyes blink blue until going to green, then yellow, then red.

However, taking any damage will momentarily paralyze the craft, remove any speed power-ups, reset the weapon to the defeat Pulse Bullet, and remove one weapon power level.

== Plot ==
A hostile alien presence has descended upon the Earth's waters. Using their own bacteria, the aliens have infected and mutated numerous deep sea and marine life forms causing them to enlarge and to follow every alien command. The aliens use their infected marine life to attack the shores of the Earth's continents, initiating an invasion from the deep. Alone, players control the Earth's only defense against the attack, the A.N.G.E.L. Fish Attack Sub.

== Reception ==
Reception

Review scores
Publication	Score
Aktueller Software Markt	6/12
Computer and Video Games	58%
Electronic Gaming Monthly	4/10, 4/10, 4/10, 3/10
Famitsu	4/10, 6/10, 6/10, 3/10
Joystick	38%
Marukatsu PC Engine	4/10, 5/10, 6/10, 5/10
The Games Machine (UK)	58%
Tilt	7/20

Deep Blue garnered generally unfavorable reviews from critics. The game was criticized for its broken difficult, simplistic gameplay, and for the unispired visuals which feels like a poor imitation of Darius.
