= Paranoid Dream of the Zodiac =

Paranoid Dream Of The Zodiac

Studio album by Balzac
- Released: 2006
- Genre: Horror punk
- Label: Gan-Shin
- Producer: balzac

Balzac chronology
Deep Blue: Chaos from Darkism II (2006)	Paranoid Dream Of The Zodiac (2006)	Deep Blue: Chaos from Darkism (2007)

Paranoid Dream of the Zodiac is a 2007 album by the band Balzac. The CD combines two of Zodiac's (Balzac's side-project) - "Beware on Halloween" and the maxi-single "Zodiac x Balzac".

== Track listing ==
1. "Before the Nightmare"
2. "Brain Control"
3. "the Fright"
4. "Hurt"
5. "the 13th. on Friday Night"
6. "Killer in the Window"
7. "Dream of the Zodiac pt.1"
8. "Beware on Halloween"
9. "Paranoia"
10. "Dream of the Zodiac pt.2"
11. "Zodiac Killer pt.3"
12. "No Mercy"
13. "Unfinished"

== Personnel ==
- Hirosuke - vocals
- Atsushi - guitar
- Akio - bass guitar
- Takayuki - drums
