= Deep Blue: Chaos from Darkism =

Studio album by Balzac
- Released: 2007
- Recorded: LM Studio Osaka
- Genre: Horror punk
- Label: Misfits
- Producer: Balzac

Balzac chronology
Paranoid Dream of the Zodiac (2007)	Deep Blue: Chaos from Darkism (2007)	Hatred: Destruction = Construction (2008)

Deep Blue: Chaos from Darkism is an album by the band Balzac.

AllMusic stated in its review of the album, "On the surface, Deep Blue: Chaos from Darkism is one grim, energetic record that combines the roughness of hardcore with the classic melodic punk of Bad Religion."

== Track listing ==
1. "Death and Confrontation"
2. "Godless"
3. "The Scare"
4. "In Those Days"
5. "D.A.R.K."
6. "Horrorock"
7. "Ziggy Stardust"
8. "The Gaze"
9. "rain"
10. "[Untitled]"
11. "Deep Blue"
12. "Japanese Chaos"
13. "XXXxxx"
14. "[Untitled]"
15. "Japanese Trash"
16. "I Can't Stand It Anymore"
17. "Alone"
18. "D.A.R.K. [Demo Non Digital Ver.][*]"
19. "Came out of the Grave [Alternate Ver.][#][*]"
20. "Gyakusatsu-No Mukou-Gava [Demo Ver.][*]"
21. "I Can't Stand It Anymore [Demo Ver.][*]"
22. "Zetsubou-No Aro Basho-E [Alternate Ver.][#][*]"

=== DVD ===
1. "Balzac Live At The Liquid Room, April 3rd 2005 (Complete Concert)"
2. "Night the fiendish ghoul came out of the grave" (Redux Version)
3. "Fall 2005 USA Tour Documentarie"
4. "Shocker" promotional trailer
5. "Gimmie Some Truth" (Osaka, 2004)
6. "XXXxxx" (Yami Bandana Live, Tokyo 2004)
7. "In Those Days"
8. "D.A.R.K." (Deep Blue Ver.)
9. "Gyakusatsu-No Mukou-Gawa"
10. "Yami No Hikari e"
11. "Deep Blue"

== Personnel ==
- Hirosuke - vocals
- Atsushi - guitar
- Akio - bass guitar
- Takayuki - drums

=== Additional recording members ===
- Nobusuke - chorus
- Miki - piano
- Ryan & Lana Moldenhauer - katari
