= Terrifying! Art of Dying – The Last Men on Earth II =

Studio album by Balzac
- Released: 21 August 2002
- Genre: Horror punk
- Length: 66:33
- Label: Diwphalanx Records

Balzac chronology
Zennou-Naru Musuu-No Me Ha Shi Wo Yubi Sasu (2000)	Terrifying! Art of Dying – The Last Men on Earth II (2002)	Beyond the Darkness (2003)

Terrifying! Art of Dying – The Last Men on Earth II is a two-disc album by the Japanese horror punk band Balzac, released in 2002.

== Track listing ==
Side one
No.	Title	Length
1.	"Thirteen"	2:13
2.	"Out of the Blue"	3:59
3.	"Soko-De Miteita Yami-No Mukou-No Subete-Wo"	3:44
4.	"In Your Face"	0:44
5.	"The Silence of Crows ~ Brazilian Horror Movie 'In Bloody Face' Theme"	4:21
6.	"A Day in the Darkness"	5:04
7.	"Vanishes in Oblivion ~ Out of the Blue (Reprise)"	4:13
Total length:		24:18

Side two
No.	Title	Length
1.	"Night of the Blood Beast"	3:08
2.	"Diabolos"	3:14
3.	"13 Ghosts"	1:14
4.	"Day the Earth Caught Fire"	3:02
5.	"Long Way -Before the Day Goes Over the Night-"	3:01
6.	"God of Mercy"	4:18
7.	"Fiendish Ghouls"	2:23
8.	"Night Tide"	2:01
9.	"Vanishes in Oblivion"	3:07
10.	"From Hell It Came"	3:38
11.	"Psycho in 308"	2:36
12.	"Monster II"	3:47
13.	"Girl from Horrorwood"	6:46
Total length:		42:15

== Personnel ==
- Hirosuke – vocals
- Atsushi – guitar
- Akio – bass guitar
- Kill – drums
