= The Birth of Evil =

Studio album by Balzac
- Released: December 5, 2008
- Recorded: Studio A
- Genre: Horror punk
- Length: 51:10 min
- Label: Diwphalanx Records
- Producer: Balzac and Diwphalanx Records

Balzac chronology
Hatred: Destruction = Construction (2008)	The Birth of Evil (2008)	Paradox (2009)

The Birth of Evil is an album by the Japanese horror punk band Balzac. The album contains re-recordings of the band's earliest material. Tracks 1–6 are from the first demo tape Scapegoat 666, tracks 7–12 are from the second demo tape Descent of the Diabolos and tracks 13–17 are unreleased songs that were generally played by Hirosuke's previous band, Astrozombies. The two versions of The Complete Legacy Book, labeled as "Scapegoat" and "Diabolos", each contain a re-recording of the original demo tape associated with the version of the book, and these recordings appear on The Birth of Evil remastered. The remaining tracks are entirely new to this album. The Birth of Evil is billed as the "Early Balzac Songs 1992–1994 Compilation" on the back cover.

== Track listing ==
1. "Balzac"
2. "Go Against with My Monster"
3. "Nothing"
4. "Diabolic"
5. "Goddamn Son of a Bitch"
6. "Scapegoat"
7. "Scapegoat"
8. "Diabolos"
9. "Violent Paradise"
10. "Thirteenth"
11. "God of Mercy"
12. "Monster"
13. "Eeba"
14. "Who Will Survive"
15. "The Final Day"
16. "Break Down"
17. "Final Freedom"

== Credits ==
- Hirosuke - vocals
- Atsushi - guitar, chorus
- Akio - bass guitar, chorus
- Takayuki - drums, chorus
