= Balzac (band) =

Japanese punk rock band

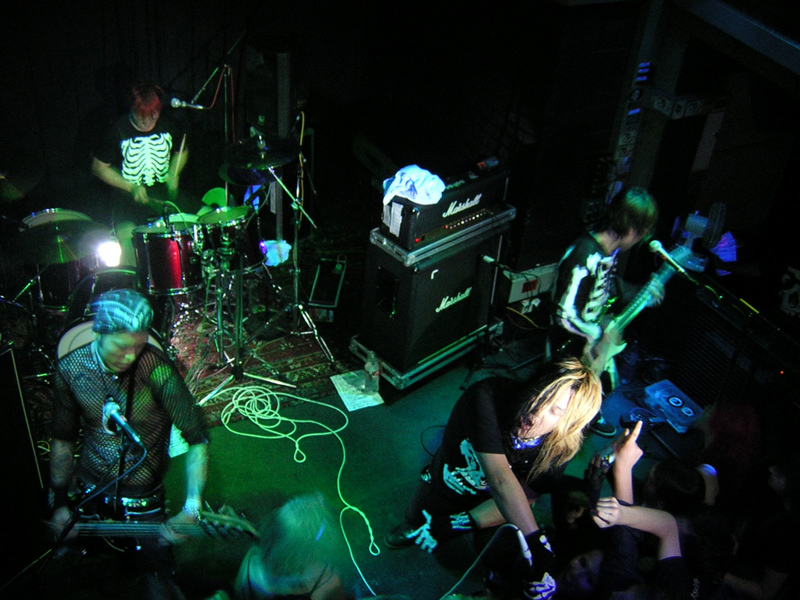
- Balzac performing at B72 Club in Vienna, Austria, 2005. Clockwise: Atsushi, Hirosuke, Akio and Takayuki.

Background information
- Origin: Kyoto, Japan
- Genres: Horror punk; hardcore punk; electropunk; digital hardcore; alternative rock; punk rock
- Years active: 1992–present
- Labels: Alchemy, Diwphalanx, Misfits Records/Rykodisc, FiendForce, Gan-Shin, Evilegend13
- Members: Hirosuke Nishiyama; Atsushi Nakagawa; Akio Imai
- Past members: Tetsuya; Yoritsugu "Anti" Azuchi; Naoki; Koji; Hajime Nishio; Kill; Masami; Futoshi Okano; Masami; Takayuki Manabe
- Website: https://www.balzac.jp/

Balzac (typeset as BALZAC) is a Japanese punk rock band formed in 1992 in Kyoto. The band was founded by singer and songwriter Hirosuke Nishiyama, who has remained the only constant member of the band since its creation. Since the beginning, Balzac was highly influenced by the sound and image of the American horror punk band Misfits and, especially during the very early years, Glenn Danzig's Samhain, adopting and combining the musical and visual style of both bands to create their own. Balzac's lyrics, though not always serious in tone, often deal with themes of darkness, loneliness and fear.

Balzac has gained a certain amount of recognition and exposure outside of their native country, where they are well-known. Currently they have five official clothing brands (Shocker!!!, Dementia 13, Culture, XXXxxx and Balzac) with one store in Japan, plus three online stores (Shocker Webstore, Shocker World Wide and Shocker EU). They also have their own official record label called Evilegend 13 Records on which they have released EPs, singles and videos. Balzac is also well known for its toy releases, some created by the companies T.W.I.M. and Secret Base, and its extensive discography and side-projects.

The current lineup of the band consists of Hirosuke Nishiyama (vocals), Atsushi Nakagawa (guitar/chorus) and Akio Imai (bass/chorus). Musically the band has drawn from punk, pop, industrial and noise, across their various releases.

== History ==
=== 1993–1995: Early years ===
Prior to forming Balzac, vocalist and songwriter Hirosuke Nishiyama was frontman for Astrozombies, a band from Kyoto, Japan, that was heavily influenced by the Japanese rock group Gastunk and the American punk band Misfits. After releasing just one demo cassette, entitled The Texas Chainsaw Massacre, Hirosuke decided to disband and started his next project, Balzac, in 1992. The name of the new band came from the famous French novelist and playwright, Honoré de Balzac. Hirosuke first came in contact with the novelist's work during junior high school; he liked how the name sounded and decided to use it. The band's first lineup consisted of Hirosuke Nishiyama on vocals, Yoritsugu "Anti" Azuchi on bass, Tetsuya on guitar and Naoki on drums. During that time the band released their first demo cassette, which was limited to 13 copies only, entitled Scapegoat666.

In 1993, by the release of their second demo cassette, Descent of the Diabolos, the band went through their first lineup change. Guitarist Atsushi Nakagawa and drummer Koji replaced Tetsuya and Naoki, respectively. This new lineup went on to release the band's first single, "The Lord of the Light and of the Darkness", on their own record label, Evilegend13 Records. Over the next few years the band released four more singles, "Atom Age Vampire in 308" (on MCR), "Isolation From No. 13" (on HG Fact), "When the Fiendish Ghouls Night" (on Evilegend13 Records), and were part of some various artists compilations.

By 1995 the band managed to release their first full-length album, The Last Men on Earth, after being signed to Alchemy Records. This would be their only release on Alchemy. Just before releasing their 3rd single, "Isolation From No. 13," the band lost its long-time bassist (and Jerry Only lookalike), Anti, as well as their drummer, H. Nishio. A long-time friend of Hirosuke's and avid Balzac fan, Akio Imai, joined the band as the new bassist. Masami sat behind the drums for the next few releases.

=== 1997–1999: Breakout ===
During 1997, when they were about to record their second full-length album, Deep - Teenagers from Outer Space, the band once again found themselves without a drummer. They recruited another long-time friend and very experienced drummer, Futoshi Okano, to fill the spot. They would call upon him a few times over the years to help out with recordings when they found themselves without a drummer. Okano is a very technical drummer and was able to include his signature sound into the new recordings. Member swaps were not the only changes for the band happening at that time; they also became a part of Diwphalanx Records on Halloween of that year. Though not a major label, Diwphalanx Records is very well known in the indie scene throughout Japan. All subsequent major releases by the band would be on Diwphalanx Records, or on the band's own label, Evilegend13 Records.

In the year of 1998, Kill joined the band as the new drummer, while they began to gain real recognition and notoriety in the indie scene. At this moment they had caught the attention of the recently re-incarnated Misfits. Now being headed by original member and long time bassist Jerry Only, Balzac was asked to open for The Misfits when they came for their first Japanese tour. This would mark a milestone in the band's career, which would lead to much success for Balzac outside Japan in the coming years. This year was explosive to the band, as they were playing in much larger venues and to a bigger crowd. They released a split CD with The Hate Honey, were featured on the Devilock Night video, released their own VHS, entitled Video Deep II, and their third album, 13 Stairway - The Children of the Night. They launched a full-scale all-Japan tour to promote their album and played to sold-out crowds.

In 1999, Balzac released a split single, "Oldevils Legend of Blood", with friends and fellow Japanese rock band Sobut. They released a special 12-inch version of "Isolation From No. 13", a remixed tape as a special box set with toy industry friends, T.W.I.M (The World Is Mine) whose headquarters are in Nagoya, as well as playing on a Gastunk tribute album. On Halloween they released one of their most popular singles, "Into the Light From the 13 Dark Night", on vinyl, CD, and cassette. It would be re-recorded in many different versions over the next few years. They also released the flexi 7-inch including "Neat Neat Neat," a Damned cover. This year also marked the beginning of the band's own fan club, the Fiendish Club. Obviously modeled after The Misfits' Fiend Club, it offered fans a great way to stay in touch with the band and to receive some very rare items at the same time; it was exclusively for people living in Japan. Eventually the band would create the Fiendish Club International and the Fiendish Club Europe, exclusive versions of the original Fiendish Club for people residing outside Japan and in Europe, respectively.

=== 2000–2005: Expansion ===
2000 saw The Misfits back touring Japan, and Balzac was there opening for them once again. Directly after, they played a string of shows with The Mad Capsule Markets. In this year there was a lot of heavy touring for the band, but they managed to release another video and the Kubrick sets. These sets included cute Medicom Toy Co. versions of the band members and their "Hands of 9 Evils" 7-inch was included in the package. Soon after, they released a figure, this time a 12-inch RAH version of the band's mascot, the Paperbag Man. In December 2000 Balzac released their next full-length album, Zennou-Naru Musuu-No Me Ha Shi Wo Yubi Sasu. It was a concept album and sold extremely well. The album was very dark and had very strong industrial influences. Balzac opened their first retail store in Osaka, Japan during this year. "Shocker!!!" was something they had wanted to open for a long time. It is a small store where they sell their own original brand, Shocker!!!! merchandise, as well as band merchandise. Hirosuke also has his own clothing brand called "Dementia Thirteen" which is also available through the store. Most recently, they have also launched yet another clothing brand, "Culture", and are in the process of fully releasing another one called "XXXxxx".

In early 2001 the band released numerous singles, as well as a box set featuring the amazing artwork of Japanese manga artist Suehiro Maruo, which had been used on the album Zennou-Naru Musuu no Me ha Shi wo Yubi Sasu. They also contributed a noise rock version of "Day the Earth Caught Fire" and another very catchy pop-influenced song, "The Silence of the Crows" on the Abstruct Madness split with Rocky and the Sweden and Delta. "The Silence of the Crows" would prove to be an instant hit with many fans. Near the end of the year the band found themselves once again without a drummer. Kill quit the band for personal reasons and was replaced by Takayuki. He had been a friend of the band's for many years and had just quit playing for the band The Batties Boys. They also opened their second retail store, Coffin, in Kyoto.

For 2002 Balzac released a split single with The Misfits. Balzac covered the songs "The Haunting" and "Don't Open 'Til Doomsday" as a medley, while The Misfits covered the Balzac's "Day the Earth Caught Fire". In April 2002 Balzac released their fifth full-length studio album. The album was a double disc set called Terrifying! Art of Dying – The Last Men On Earth II. The first disc was mostly new material while disc two was a complete re-recording of the band's first full-length CD, The Last Man On Earth. On Halloween the band was invited to play in New York City, United States, with The Misfits, making this the first time the band played live outside Japan. They were received very well and would be asked back to tour the following summer.

The year of 2003 would be a huge one for the band internationally. Before touring with The Misfits, The Damned, The Dickies, and Agnostic Front, they released a maxi-single entitled "Beware of Darkness". It was included as a part of a special 4-figure toy set from Medicom Toys Co. The video for the song was recorded in the US and was released in May 2003. There was a censored, as well as uncensored version, due to the graphic nature of the video. They also released their first USA CD, Beyond the Darkness, on the newly founded Misfits Records. In September they released Out of the Light of the 13 Dark Night on the German label, G-Force Records.

In 2004 they released their sixth full-length album, Came Out of the Grave. It was released in a special edition long-box with a Be@rbrick figure inside. During that summer they played a large festival with American punk rock band Rancid, and released a tour documentary about their first US tour, The Fiend Fest. It featured artwork by an American fan, Tony O'Farrel. They also played their first tour in Europe during the summer. The band had truly become an international success. The band also released a special limited single entitled "Zodiac Killer" under the name Zodiac and even played a special live show as the "secret" side project band. They also played a special live show playing only Misfits covers as a part of a very special live event during the Christmas holiday season.

By 2005 they released the single "D.A.R.K". Soon after they released a mini album entitled Dark-Ism. This mini album included a song entitled "Yami no Hikari e" which had a much different sound than previous Balzac recordings. They shot a promotional video clip for the song too (released with a full-color hardcover photo history book), which was also very different from their other videos. It showed the world another side of the band that had not been explored much. This song was originally performed on stage with Hirosuke playing rhythm guitar. This year also saw the band touring Japan again for the Darkism Tour. Late in the year they played the track "Moonlight", a Buck-Tick cover for the tribute album Parade -Respective Tracks of Buck-Tick-, as well as a version of The Damned's "Smash It Up" for a tribute to The Damned. They also released a special picture disc 7-inch with T.W.I.M where they included the new song, "(I Touched the Silence of the) Rain". This was an earlier, rough version of the song that would later be included on the "Horrorock" single, which was included with a new 12-inch Paperbag Man figure from Medicom Toys Co., which came in two limited colors.

=== 2006–2008: Deep Blue and Hatred ===
Balzac started out 2006 in earnest. They released their seventh full-length album, Deep Blue: Chaos from Darkism II in March. It was coupled with a special SkullBat figure, also in 2 limited colors. The all-Japan tour began soon after. During the tour they released their first "real" best-of CD, 13 Hits From Darkism. It includes many of the band's classic songs re-recorded with all the energy of the past combined with the technical talent of the present. A huge 66-song, 2-disc, DVD set was released during the tour as well. A second, smaller-scale DVD-r of Yami Live from 2004 was released during the tour as well. Balzac also played two extra special shows. The first show was in Tokyo's Shimokitazawa Yaneura at the end of June to a small crowd of 138 fans. The second was on 1 July in Osaka at Osaka's Namba Bears, the small club where the band's career began. During this year the band released the album The Deranged Mad Zombies under the same name without giving any notice and hiding completely all traces of Balzac's connection to the album.

On 11 November, Balzac released a full-length Zodiac album to end the year, Beware On Halloween. They also played a few huge shows with the visual kei band Mucc, and put on a special year-end live event where they took the stage as both Balzac and Zodiac. In 2007 Balzac released a 6-CD set of totally re-mastered previous releases. Once again they toured Europe and the US, just after putting on a special memorial tour in Japan commemorating the release of their re-masters set. In 2007 they released a new single, "Swallow the Dark".

In April 2008, Balzac released their 8th full-length album entitled Hatred: Destruction = Construction. It marked a return to the heavier and darker side for the band, reminiscent of some of their earlier work which was more brooding and dark. It was released in a regular edition, as well as a 666mm special edition featuring artwork by comic book artist Liam Sharp. Around the first week of December the band released " The Box Of 4 Evils", a box set containing re-recordings of the first 2 demos by the band and a couple of others songs from their early years, all of this in cassette format. On 30 December, the band released a commemorative DVD/CD for the 10 years on the release of their album 13 Stairway – The Children of the Night, calling it "Live From 13 Stairway: Shelter & Fandango 1998".

=== 2009–2012 – Paradox, Judgement Day, Deranged and 20th anniversary ===
In March they released a remake of the old "One Night In Hell" Box set, with exactly the same contents the old one had but with the songs re-recorded. Also starting on March, the band released the first of twelve thematic "CD+T-shirt" sets called "Shock & Horror! Weird the Balzac". Each set will have a special T-shirt and a remix CD of a specific song and design. They will be available on the 13th of each month and will be available for buying until the release of the next set. Each song will be arranged and remixed by the band drummer, Takayuki Manabe.

Around May 2009, the band gave the first hints on the process of making their next full-length album. They also released a couple of toys, shirts, pens, mugs and other items in collaboration with the Japanese company Sanrio, more specifically their character Hello Kitty, having the famous cat donning the characteristic skullsuit that the band has made so popular.

On 21 August the band released their new full-length, a mini-album titled Paradox. The album was fully produced by Takeshi Ueda of The Mad Capsule Markets fame. Balzac and The Mad Capsule Markets have had a close relationship for over 13 years and finally they had a chance to collaborate on this very special release. Takeshi has not only fully produced the entire mini-album, he has also done all the programming and recording arrangement. The album presents the established Balzac's horror punk tunes with the addition of their characteristic digital hardcore style, now present on the whole album. The band has come to refer to this sound as a "new digital horror punk sound". The mini-album was released along a single, in vinyl format, and a special Box Set release. The European release of the album is being expected for 16 October, this version will include a bonus DVD titled Hatred Lies Deep Inside, which was previously released and has a full promotional video for every song on the album Hatred: Construction = Destruction.

Then, on 11 December 2009 the band released a 44-track, double disc CD ´Best-of´ album entitled Complete Legacy of Evilegend: The Best of Balzac. Many of the tracks have been re-recorded or re-worked.

2010 also proved to be a busy year for Balzac. In March Balzac played two shows, for the first time ever, in Taiwan. A nationwide tour of Japan with GNz-WORD was also completed. A split single with RADIOTS which included cover versions of the MISFITS’ classics, “Astrozombies” and “I Turned Into a Martian” was released in September. As well, a new full-length album entitled “JUDGEMENT DAY” released on 6 October. BAKI, from the legendary Japanese rock band, GASTUNK does guest vocals on Balzac's cover of the GASTUNK song “Red Indians Rock”. A Tour supporting the album is planned.

In January 2011 Balzac released their second “best-of” CD entitled Complete Legacy of Horror: The Best of Balzac II, alongside three special CD releases: ‘Psycho Night’, ‘Dark Night’ and ‘Black Night’. In March the band toured with New Rote’ka, and released a special limited edition set through Shocker to commemorate the tour. On 27 August Balzac played a special Fiendish Club ‘One Man’ show called “Dirty Black Summer” and released the DVD Complete Legacy of Atom-Age Vampire: The Films of Balzac. Around this time Hirosuke also did some vocals on the song ‘We’re Not Alone’, a track by AA=/Mad Capsule Markets fame, Takeshi Ueda. Many indie rock band-members took part in the recording (and music video) that was used to raise money for the aid of those affected by the horrific earthquake and tsunami that had hit Japan earlier in the year. In the fall a new maxi-single, "Deranged" was announced and released on 7 December.

2012 marked the 20th Anniversary of Balzac. To celebrate many special release and live performances are in the works. A release of their first 7-inch single, ‘Lord of the Light and of the Darkness’, their 2nd 7-inch, ‘Atom-Age Vampire in 308′, and the ‘One Night in Hell’ cassette box will be released for the 1st time even on CD, newly remastered. These CD's were available during their 20th Anniversary Tour in January, February and March. In March, they re-released these three singles again on 7" Picture Disc. In July they announced a New Live DVD entitled "20120310 SHIMOKITAZAWA SHELTER – DERANGED TOUR 2012".

In January, Balzac announced their 10th album entitled "BLACKOUT" which has one single so far ("The Bleeding Black") and is slated for a 8 March 2013 Release date. On 10 February, they released the PV for "The Bleeding Black" and 12 days later released the PV for "Hell Rising".

=== 2012–present ===
After canceling their performances at "DEADLY CIRCUS" (September 13th 2025) and PUNK LIVES! 2025 (September 15th 2025), on September 17th 2025 they announced that their drummer Takayuki Manabe deceased on September 11th 2025.

== Side projects ==
Apart from the main band, Balzac is also well known in the scene for their multiple side-projects, which mainly consist of the same members of the band playing in a different style or under a specific theme.

=== Zodiac ===
The origins of this band date to 2004, when Balzac first released a CD entitled Zodiac Killer under the name of Zodiac and by playing live events under that name too. Both the name and lyrics of the band, as well as the merchandise, are based on the famous North American serial killer known as the Zodiac Killer. This cold-blooded assassin gained much recognition for his cruel killings and encrypted letters that he sent both to the police and newspapers. He was never caught. In 2006 the band created the Zodiac Fan Club (Z.F.C.), an offshoot of the Fiendish Club dedicated to the new band and only available for Japanese residents. They also released the first and so far only full-length album, Beware On Halloween. The musical style of Zodiac's songs have the same sound and style as old Balzac songs during that band's first years of existence. As they do with Balzac, the band has also released toys and clothing under Zodiac's name and image.

Recently the band decided to release yet another Box release under this name. The Box package known as "Zodiac Is Alive" contained a couple of T-shirts and other Zodiac goodies plus a new Zodiac recording, a 2 track single CD, "Death Waltz/Seventeen", and a split cassette between Zodiac and The Deranged Mad Zodiac, the latter being a Zodiac version of their also parallel band, The Deranged Mad Zombies.

=== The Deranged Mad Zombies ===
The Deranged Mad Zombies, like Zodiac, is a band composed of the same members of Balzac; it first appeared in 2006. The name came from various influences of singer-songwriter Hirosuke. "Deranged" comes from the title of one of his favorite movies. "Mad" derives from the name of one of his favorite Japanese bands, the Mad Capsule Markets. "Zombies" is taken from The Misfits song "Astrozombies". More than a side-project, this band is an experiment by the band members who felt like doing it just for fun. All the songs released under this name are in fact Balzac songs, mixed down rougher and trashier, giving each song more of a lo-fi and under-produced sound. For the full-length album the band launched under this moniker, they kept their identities hidden using nicknames and showing no track list or band photo on the package. Only 20 copies of the self-titled CD were pre-ordered before the fans found that this was in fact Balzac in disguise. So far the band has released two more albums and one official bootleg under this name.

=== 728 Misfits: Naniwa Misfits ===
728 Misfits, also known as Naniwa Misfits, is a Misfits cover band formed by Balzac. This is the less known side-project of the band and the only one without any official releases. So far Balzac has kept this band only for special and rare live events, without any known plans to release any singles or albums using this alter-ego. Peer-to-peer programs around the Internet have circulated a bootleg containing a rehearsal of this band, as well as a bootleg video of their famous live event at Molotow Club in Hamburg, Germany.

== Discography ==
Studio albums
1995	The Last Men on Earth (1st studio album)
1997	Deep – Teenagers from Outer Space (2nd studio album)
1998	13 Stairway – The Children of the Night (3rd studio album)
2000	Zennou-Naru Musuu-No Me Ha Shi Wo Yubi Sasu (4th studio album)
2002	Terrifying! Art of Dying – The Last Men On Earth II (5th studio album)
2004	Came Out of the Grave (6th studio album)
2005	Dark-Ism (Mini album)
2006	Deep Blue: Chaos from Darkism II (7th studio album)
2007	Paranoid Dream of the Zodiac (European album of Zodiac material)
2008	Hatred: Destruction = Construction (8th studio album)
2008	The Birth of Evil (Re-recordings of Demo material)
2009	Paradox (Mini album)
2010	Judgement Day (9th studio album)
2013	Blackout (10th studio album)
2015	Bloodsucker (11th studio album)
2015	Bloodsucker Returns (Mini album)
2019	Hybrid Black (12th studio album)
2025	Evil Legend Thirteen (13th studio album)

== Band members ==
=== Current ===
- Hirosuke Nishiyama – vocals (1992–present)
- Atsushi Nakagawa – guitar (1993–present)
- Akio Imai – bass guitar (1996–present)

=== Former ===
- Toyoki Takimoto – guitar
- Tetsuya Kitagawa – guitar (1992–1993)
- Yoritsugu "Anti" Azuchi – bass guitar (1992–1996)
- Naoki Shinjo – drums (1992–1993)
- Koji – drums (1993–1994)
- Hajime Nishio – drums (1994–1996)
- Masami – drums (1996–1997)
- Futoshi Okano – session drummer (1997–2002)
- Kill – drums (1997–2001)
- Takayuki Manabe – drums (2001–2025)
