= Dark-Ism =

Studio album by Balzac
- Released: 2005
- Genre: Horror punk Noise rock

Balzac chronology
Came Out of the Grave (2004)	Dark-Ism (2005)	Out of the Grave and into the Dark (2005)

Dark-Ism is a 2005 mini-album by the band Balzac.

The song D.A.R.K. was released as a single with an accompanying music video. A picture disc edition of the album was released which was limited to 999 copies.

== Track listing ==
1. "Beyond Evil 308, Pt. 1"
2. "D.A.R.K."
3. "Blood Inside '68"
4. "Beyond Evil 308, Pt. 2"
5. "Gyakusatsu-No-Mukougawa"
6. "XXXxxx"
7. "I Can't Stand It Anymore"
8. "Yami-No-Hikari-E"

== Credits ==
- Hirosuke - vocals
- Atsushi - guitar
- Akio - bass guitar
- Takayuki - drums
