= Deep Blue Sea (hat) =

Deep Blue Sea is a hat designed by Australian milliner, Ann-Maree Willett, which is made from Australian wool felt and set with 26 precious opals from Lightning Ridge, weighing a total of 1447.5 carats.

Deep Blue Sea was the feature piece of the ‘Climate’ series of hats that launched Willett's international millinery career. It contains more Lightning Ridge precious opal than has been brought together on any other wearable item and became known as “the million-dollar opal hat”, then later as “the most valuable hat ever offered at public auction.”

== History ==
In 2007, milliner Ann-Maree Willett was invited to represent Australia with a collection of hats at the Corso Como design Centre in Milan, Italy. The collection, ‘Climate’, comprised a series of hats inspired by Australia's natural environments, earned Willett one of the few Churchill Fellowships to be awarded for design in Australia, as well as a relationship with Italian company Borsellino. The centerpiece of this collection, Deep Blue Sea, was designed and manufactured as an item of runway or catwalk couture - a wearable sculpture rather than an everyday item.

Deep Blue Sea was inspired by the Great Barrier Reef, the largest coral reef system on Earth, located off the coast of Queensland in northeast Australia. To create the hat, Willett collaborated with opal miners Vicki and Peter Drackest of Down to Earth Opals at Lightning Ridge in NSW, Australia, and master goldsmith Gerd Gerald Schulz, also of Lightning Ridge and formerly from Idar-Oberstein in Germany, a city famous as a gemstone centre.

Featuring 28 precious opals weighing a total of 1486.34 carats and custom mounted in 337.5 grams of sterling silver and 18-carat yellow gold, Deep Blue Sea had a retail value of over $1 million. It became widely known as “the million-dollar hat."

Following its debut in Milan in February 2007, Deep Blue Sea was shown at the L'Oréal Melbourne Fashion Festival in March 2007, then the Australian Masters of Fashion Awards in July 2007, followed by a national tour of Australia. In February 2008, two of the opals on the hat were sold, leaving 26 opals weighing 1447.5 carats. The hat was exhibited again at the Australian Opal Exhibition in July 2008, then at the International Opal Jewellery Design Awards in July 2009.

== Materials ==
Deep Blue Sea is made of Australian wool felt on a wire armature and features 26 carved natural precious opals set amidst feathers. The felt was hand blocked into cups representing coral polyps.

Each of the opals was hand-carved by either Daniela Labiate or Christine Roussel, multi-award-winning master opal carvers regarded as world leaders in their craft. Opal types represented include black opal, dark opal, and crystal opal. The opals are mounted in custom-made settings engineered and manufactured by Gerd Gerald Schulz using metals including sterling silver and 18-carat yellow gold.

== Couture context ==
Deep Blue Sea incorporates more than 1400 carats of precious Australian opal, hand-carved into sculptural shapes and incorporating a full spectrum of colours, into couture millinery and fashion.

Deep Blue Sea drew media attention for its extravagance and its high value both as a hat and as wearable precious opal. In so doing, it joined the ranks of the world's most expensive hats, alongside works such as Louis Mariette's platinum-and-diamond ‘Chapeau amour’, David Shilling's diamond, pearl, and ruby encrusted hat formerly recognized by the Guinness Book of World Records as the most expensive hat ever, and Brent Black's ‘The Hat’, woven by Simon Espial.

== See also ==
- Opal
- Millinery
- Hat making
