= Beyond the Darkness =

Beyond The Darkness

Studio album by Balzac
- Released: July 29, 2003
- Genres: Punk rock; horror punk
- Length: 59:51
- Label: Misfits
- Producer: Balzac

Balzac chronology
Zennou-Naru Musuu-No Me Ha Shi Wo Yubi Sasu (2000)	Beyond The Darkness (2003)	Came Out of the Grave (2004)

Beyond the Darkness (Japanese: 闇を超えて, Hepburn: Yami-no mukou-no subete-wo) is a 2003 compilation album by the Japanese punk band Balzac. It features re-recordings of songs from the band's first five studio albums: The Last Men on Earth (1995), Deep – Teenagers from Outer Space (1997), 13 Stairway – The Children of the Night (1998), Zennou-Naru Musuu-No Me Ha Shi Wo Yubi Sasu (2000), and Terrifying! Art of Dying – The Last Men on Earth II (2002). Beyond the Darkness was Balzac's first North American release.

== Reception ==
Professional ratings
Review scores
Source	Rating
AllMusic	4.5/5 stars

Stewart Mason of AllMusic gave the album a score of four-and-a-half stars out of five, calling the choruses of the songs on the album "surprisingly catchy" and the album as a whole "a solidly entertaining overview of what they're [Balzac's] all about".

== Track listing ==
No.	Title	Length
1.	"Thirteen"	2:29
2.	"Day the Earth Caught Fire"	3:02
3.	"Wall"	2:51
4.	"Into the Light of the 13 Dark Night"	3:26
5.	"The Black Light Shines in '99"	2:07
6.	"Nowhere #13"	3:15
7.	"Yami-No Mukou-No Subete-Wo"	4:00
8.	"Out of the Blue II"	5:59
9.	"In Your Face"	0:44
10.	"The Silence of Crows"	2:56
11.	"Tomorrow"	2:35
12.	"Vanishes in Oblivion"	2:45
13.	"The End of Century"	2:15
14.	"Monster II"	3:33
15.	"Beware of Darkness"	4:33
16.	"Violent Paradise"	2:07
17.	"The Bleeding Light"	3:55
Total length:		52:32

Bonus tracks
No.	Title	Length
18.	"Diabolos" (live)	3:15
19.	"13 Ghosts" (live)	1:11
20.	"Day the Earth Caught Fire" (live)	2:53
Total length:		7:19

=== DVD ===
1. "Beware of Darkness"
2. "Yami-No Mukou-No Subete-Wo"
3. "The Silence of Crows"
4. "Out of the Blue"
5. "Making of Beware of Darkness"

== Personnel ==
Balzac

- Atsushi Nakagawa – lead guitar
- Akio Imai – bass guitar
- Hirosuke Nishiyama – lead vocals, art direction
- Takayuki Yasuda – drums, programming

Production

- Tetsuya Kotani – engineer
- Akihiko Takenaka – mastering
- Mikito Sakuhana – assistant
- Jerry Only – executive producer
- John Cafiero – liner notes, executive producer
