= Shlomit & RebbeSoul =

Israeli-American world music duo

- Origin: Israel/New York
- Genres: Jewish music; Yemeni music; folk rock; electronica; world music
- Years active: 2011–present
- Members: Shlomit Levi; RebbeSoul
- Website: shlomit-rebbesoul.com

Shlomit & RebbeSoul is an Israeli-American world music duo, consisting of Yemeni-Israeli singer Shlomit Levi and American musician RebbeSoul (Bruce Burger). Formed in 2011, they released their debut album, The Seal of Solomon, in 2015.

== History ==
Prior to collaborating, Shlomit Levi, an Israeli vocalist of Yemenite Jewish descent, had performed with the metal band Orphaned Land as well as singer-songwriter Boaz Sharabi. Meanwhile, Bruce "RebbeSoul" Burger, a successful solo artist in America since the early 1990s, moved to the Israeli town of Zikhron Ya'akov in 2007; there, he was a guitarist for the band Hamakor, and his 2010 album From Another World found success on Israeli radio. Levi and Burger were introduced in 2011 by Yedidia Snir, a business manager Burger had been consulting for his Israeli music career, and the two began performing together. Over the next few years, they toured in Israel and New York, including a show at Nazareth College in upstate New York, with a band that included Orpahned Land drummer Matan Shmuely. They also collaborated with photographer Dina Bova on promotional artwork, which incorporated classic Yemenite henna designs.

Shlomit & RebbeSoul's debut album, The Seal of Solomon, was released independently on February 10, 2015, with cover art by Bova. Later in the year, the duo performed at Baronita in Zikhron Ya'akov as well as a series of concerts in Northeastern New Jersey. Elsewhere, Burger produced several songs for Christian Arab oud player George Simaan, including a version of "Erev Shel Shoshanim" with Levi on vocals.

After a period of inactivity, in 2019 the group released a new single, "YemenaY YaY". In April 2021, they released the single and music video "Bereishit (Genesis)"; drawing from artist Yael Kanarek's Toratah project, the song uses a regendered Hebrew and English version of the opening text of Genesis that uses feminine pronouns for God.

== Musical style ==
The music of Shlomit & RebbeSoul combines traditional Jewish and Yemenite music with rock, folk, electronica, and world music, with Levi singing in Hebrew, English, Arabic, Yemenite and Aramaic. Their repertoire includes both songs from the Ashkenazi Jewish canon, such as "Avinu Malkeinu", and traditional Yemenite songs like "Abdah", a Yemenite wedding song. Levi's embrace of Yemenite music was inspired by Ofra Haza, and her vocals were described by Lior Phillips of The Jerusalem Post as "ruminative, unburdening, sometimes startlingly unguarded", while Burger's rock guitar playing has influences of Keith Richards, Jimi Hendrix, Martin Barre, Pete Townshend, Eric Clapton, Mark Knopfler, Steely Dan, and Shlomo Carlebach. They have also cited Israeli musician Idan Raichel as an artist who similarly combines the music of various cultures.

== Discography ==
=== Studio albums ===
- The Seal of Solomon (2015)

=== Singles ===
Year	Song	Album	Ref
2011	"Spirit (Ruchi)"	The Seal of Solomon	
2011	"Two Suns"	The Seal of Solomon	
2012	"Abdah Bilagual"	The Seal of Solomon	
2012	"Avinu Malkeinu"	The Seal of Solomon	
2015	"Galbi"	The Seal of Solomon	
2019	"YemenaY YaY"	non-album single	
2021	"Bereishit (Genesis)"	non-album single	

=== Music videos ===
Year	Song	Director	Ref
2012	"Abdah Bilagual"	Michael Cohen	
2012	"Avinu Malkeinu"	Michael Cohen	
2015	"Galbi" (lyric video)		
2021	"Bereishit (Genesis)"	Nitsan Tal	
