= Dina Bova =

Israeli photographer (born 1977)

- דינה בווה
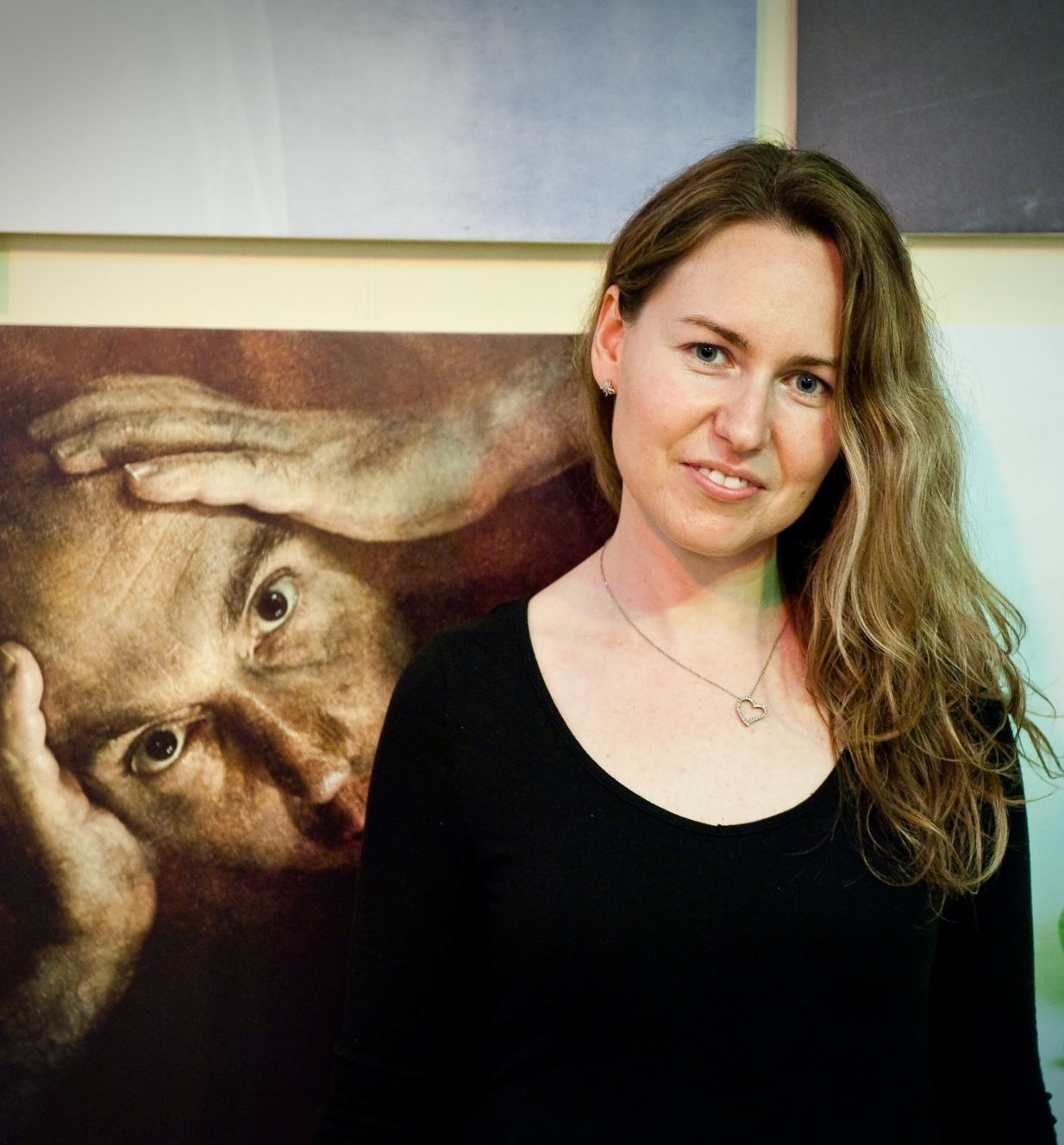
- Bova in 2010
- Born: Дина Бова; June 16, 1977 (age 49); Moscow, Russia
- Education: Tel Aviv University (B.Sc. in computer science)
- Known for: Surrealist photography
- Notable work: Elegy of Autumn
- Style: Conceptual surrealist photography
- Spouse: Gadi Boleslavsky
- Awards: Nikon Photo Contest Grand Prize

Dina Bova (Hebrew: דינה בווה; Russian: Дина Бова; born June 16, 1977) is an Israeli photographer, digital artist and artificial intelligence researcher, notable for her surrealist photography.

She has won the grand prize at the Nikon Photo Contest for 2012–2013 with the photograph Elegy of Autumn.

== Art career ==
Dina Bova specializes in conceptual surrealist photography. She began her photographic career with documentary photography, but quickly moved to surrealism. She began participating in international contests in July 2008, and won second place in Nikon's 2008–2009 photo context with Fishing in Hitchcock's Style, in the My Planet category. Her altered photo of Manarola, Italy, was a finalist in The Smithsonian's 11th annual photo contest (2013), in the altered images category. The photo, named Babylon, was inspired by Pieter Bruegel's The Tower of Babel

In the same year, her photo Elegy of Autumn won the grand prize at the Nikon Photo Contest, selected from over 100,000 entries – the first Israeli entry to have won. She describes her style as Truthful Fiction, as, according to her, "fiction may not reflect the reality as we know it, yet conveys a deep, accurate and true message". Bova lists Jan Saudek as a major inspiration.

Bova has designed album covers for a number of Israeli and Jewish musicians, including Orphaned Land and its former member Yossi Sassi, RebbeSoul and others. The Orphaned Land album cover, for the album The Road to Or Shalem, was also inspired by another Bruegel painting, The Blind Leading the Blind, and combined a photograph of the musicians with the skyline of Melbourne, Australia. She has also had artistic collaborations with Maria Kong, Yisrael Aharoni and German Kabirski.

Bova has exhibited her works in the Salon d'Automne, and has had numerous solo exhibitions, including The Truth in the Lie, Distillation of a Fantastic Reality (in Rishon Lezion), and others. She was a major contributor to the Beauty Saves the World (BSW) photography project started by her husband, which focused on fine-art photography and exhibited in multiple countries. She has taught at Galitz School of Photography in Ramat Gan, Israel, and writes guides and tutorials for various photography magazines, such as 1x and Practical Photoshop. She has given numerous talks, including in the Annual Israeli Photography Convention in 2014. She has published a book with her photographs in 2013, called Truthful Fiction, with a second edition released in 2014.

== Personal life ==
Bova was born in Moscow in 1977 and has resided in Israel since 1991. She holds a B.Sc. in computer science from Tel Aviv University. Bova works as a researcher and algorithm engineer in the field of artificial intelligence. She is married to Gadi Boleslavsky, who serves as her manager.

== Awards ==
Bova has received the following photography awards and prizes. In all, over 100 of her photographs received over 400 awards.

- 2009 – Trierenberg Super Circuit – Vöav gold medal
- 2010 – Trierenberg Super Circuit – gold medal of excellence
- 2010 – Julia Cameron Awards – two prizes and an honorable mention
- 2010 – Aquëducte Biennale – gold aquëducte author
- 2011 – Prix de la Photographie Paris – 1st place, fine art
- 2011 – DonkeyArtPrize New York – grand prize
- 2012 – Trierenberg Super Circuit – gold medal of excellence
- 2012 – Professional Women Photographers – grand prize
- 2013 – Nikon International Photo Contest – grand prize
- 2014 – Prix de la Photographie Paris – gold, fine art/people

== Selected exhibitions ==
Bova's work was featured, but not limited to, the following exhibitions.

- 2010 – Three Women, Three Worlds, Tel Aviv University, Tel Aviv, Israel
- 2010 – Magic Realism, Tel Aviv, Israel
- 2011 – Magic Realism, Moscow, Russia
- 2012 – Point of Branching. Fragility. Objective Reality, Molbert Gallery, Saint Petersburg, Russia
- 2012 – Salon d'Automne, Tel Aviv, Israel
- 2012 – Pixel in the Hand of the Artist (solo), Tel-Hai Museum of Photography, Israel
- 2013 – Truthful Fiction (solo), Weil Center, Kfar Shmaryahu, Israel
- 2013 – Forever and the Earth (solo), Konenkov Museum of Russian Academy of Arts, Moscow
- 2014 – Essence of Fantastic Reality, Rishon LeZion Culture Hall, Israel
- 2015 – NordArt, Kunstwerk Carlshütte, Büdelsdorf, Germany
- 2018 – Beauty Matters, International Photography Festival, Tel Aviv, Israel
- 2019 – International Women's Day Exhibition, Farkash Gallery, Jaffa, Israel
- 2022 – It's a Mad World virtual exhibition
- 2022 – Berlin Photo Week
