= RebbeSoul =

American musician

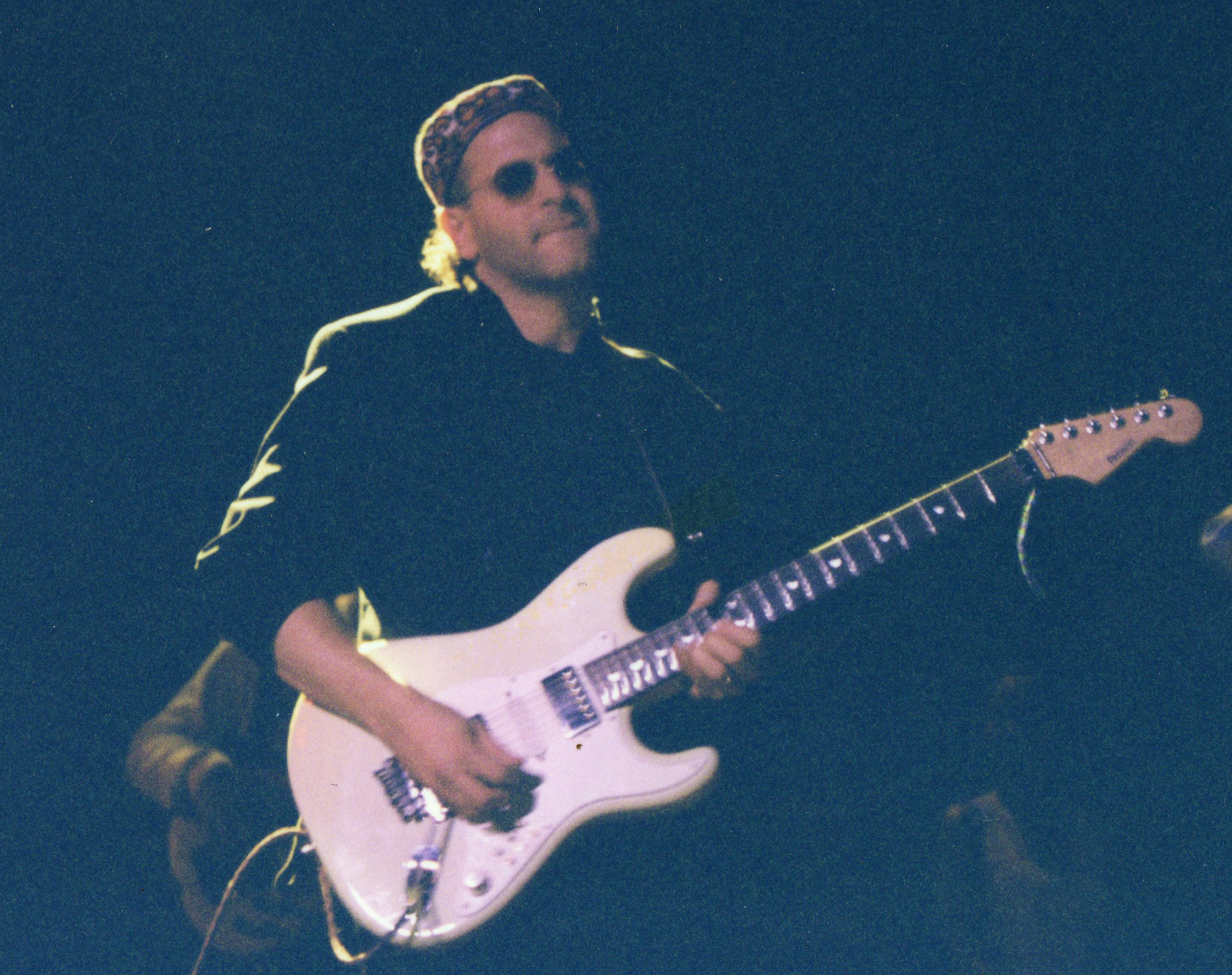
- RebbeSoul at House of Blues, West Hollywood, California

Background information
- Born: Bruce Burger; July 11, 1957 (age 68); Utica, New York, United States
- Origin: Zikhron Ya'akov, Israel
- Genres: Jewish rock, folk, soul, jazz, worldbeat
- Occupation(s): Recording artist, producer, singer, songwriter, guitarist, composer, arranger
- Instrument(s): Vocals, guitar, balalaika, mandolin, bouzouki, saz
- Years active: 1980–present
- Labels: Global Pacific, 33rd Street
- Member of: Shlomit & RebbeSoul
- Formerly of: Jazzburger; Common Tongue; Hamakor
- Website: rebbesoul.com

Bruce Burger (born July 11, 1957, Utica, New York), known by his stage name RebbeSoul, is an American singer, guitarist, multi-instrumentalist, composer, and producer. Performing since the early 1990s, he has released five solo albums and has recorded with the bands Hamakor and Common Tongue. Since 2011, he has collaborated with Yemeni-Israeli vocalist Shlomit Levi of Orphaned Land as the duo Shlomit & RebbeSoul.

== Early life ==
Burger was born in Utica, New York, to a minimally observant Conservative Jewish family. He is of Hungarian descent. Burger's mother and aunt were founders of Camp Jened, a summer camp for disabled individuals later featured in the documentary Crip Camp, and Burger himself attended the camp as a child.

When Burger was 12, his parents bought him a plastic guitar, not believing he would take the instrument seriously. However, Burger developed a love of the guitar, inspired by the likes of Keith Richards, Jimi Hendrix, Martin Barre, Pete Townshend, and Eric Clapton. He later began playing at local bars, despite being underage. He attended Syracuse University and graduated with a degree in engineering.

== Career ==
Burger left New York at 22 and moved to Los Angeles, where he worked as a session musician for various artists, including country singer Barbara Mandrell, and provided music for shows like Baywatch and Cristal. During this time, he started a jazz fusion group called Jazzburger, which included saxophonist Dave Koz, drummer Alex Acuña, and saxophonist Cornelius Bumpus.

=== RebbeSoul, Fringe of Blue, and RebbeSoul-O (1993–1999) ===
In 1992, Burger was invited to a Shabbat dinner at the home of Chabad Rabbi Shlomo Schwartz. Moved by the traditional prayers and melodies, Burger felt he had "found [his] sound" and decided to start a career in Jewish music. The following year, assembling a band of non-Jewish musicians he knew from his session work, he released his debut album, the self-titled RebbeSoul. One of the album's songs, an instrumental version of Avinu Malkeinu simply called "Avinu", received radio play on the local station KKSF.

RebbeSoul attracted the attention of Sonoma-based jazz label Global Pacific, which released Burger's 1995 follow-up, Fringe of Blue. The album's electric version of "Avinu" received praise from Playboy Magazine and The Jewish Week, while the acoustic version was played on KTWV by host Talaya Trigueros, and the songs "A Narrow Bridge" and "Tum Balalaika" appeared on the Illinois college station WNIJ.

In 1997, Burger collaborated with playwright Richard Krevolin on RebbeSoul-O: A One-Man Musical Journey, an 85-minute one-man theater piece based on Burger's musical and spiritual journey. Sponsored by the American Jewish Committee, the show premiered in March at the Ovations Theatre in Los Angeles. The soundtrack was composed and performed by Burger, who released it in album form later that year.

=== Common Tongue and Change the World with a Sound (1999–2007) ===
Burger formed the world music band Common Tongue in 1999 with percussionist Cassio Duarte, keyboardist Steve Carter, drummer Joel Alpers, bassist Dennis "Deep Den" Smith, and singer Neeyah Lynn Rose. They released their debut album, Step Into My World, in 2000.

His fourth studio album, Change the World with a Sound, was released in 2002. Duarte, Carter, and Rose were featured on the album, as were rapper Prophet X and singer Neshama Carlebach. The album reached No. 1 on the CMJ world music charts and was played on over 130 college radio stations.

=== Work in Israel (2007–present) ===
Burger made aliyah to Israel in 2007, settling in the town of Zikhron Ya'akov. There, he produced, arranged, and recorded From Another World (2010), an album of instrumental renditions of Shlomo Carlebach songs. The album received play on the Israeli stations Army Radio and 88FM. He also joined the Israeli rock band Hamakor as a guitarist, performing on their 2010 album World On Its Side.

In 2011, Burger was introduced to Shlomit Levi, a Yemenite singer who had performed with the Israeli metal band Orphaned Land. They subsequently began performing together as Shlomit & RebbeSoul, and released their debut album, The Seal of Solomon, in 2015. Later in the year, he produced a series of songs for Christian Arab oud player George Simaan, including a version of "Erev Shel Shoshanim", with Levi and Yuval Banay of Mashina contributing Hebrew vocals.

== Artistry ==
Burger is known for his diverse sound, drawing from a variety of styles and cultures. Over the course of his career, he has gradually expanded from a conventional Jewish rock sound to incorporate folk, soul, jazz, new-age and worldbeat, as well as sounds from South American, Caribbean, West African, Middle Eastern, Yemenite, and Sephardic music. Although primarily a guitarist, he also uses a wide variety of instruments in his music, most notably the balalaika. Burger attributes his eclectic sound to his years as a session musician, where he was forced to be a "chameleon" and play in many different styles. While Burger occasionally sings on his albums, he places greater emphasis on his instrumental work, saying, "I am a player that sings, not a singer that plays".

== Discography ==
=== Solo albums ===
- Rebbe/RebbeSoul (1993)
- Fringe of Blue (1995)
- RebbeSoul-O (1997)
- Change the World with a Sound (2002)
- Nigun: Voice of the Soul (with Sam Glaser) (2007)
- From Another World (2010)

==== With Common Tongue ====
- Step Into My World (2000)

==== With Hamakor ====
- World On Its Side (2010)

==== With Shlomit & RebbeSoul ====
- The Seal of Solomon (2015)

=== Compilation appearances ===
- Tranceworld: The Inspiration (1996, Global Pacific) ("Prelude"/"My Soul Thirsts For You")
- Festival of Lights, Vol. 1 (1996, PolyGram) ("Avinu")
- New Visons: World Rhythms (1998, Rhino) ("Call to Freedom")
- Prayer: A Multicultural Journey of Spirit (1998, Soundings of the Planet) ("Prayer for Peace (Harachaman)")
- Spirit of the Heart (2003, Rhino) ("Prelude"/"My Soul Thirsts For You")
- When Do We Eat? Soundtrack (2006, JMG) ("Avinu Malkeinu")
- Celebrate Shabbat (2007, Craig 'N' Co.) ("Bim Bam")
- Pioneers for a Cure, The Postcard Project (2009) ("Shir Shomer" with Lynn Rose)

=== Other credits ===
- Walter Ostanek, Putting It Together Vols. 1-2 (1996) – piano, keyboards
- Various, Festival of Lights, Vol 1 (1996) – producer, arranger
- Linda Hirschhorn, Becoming (2007) – balalaika
- Rahel, Hinay Ma Tov (2009) – featured artist ("Hinay Ma Tov", "Oseh Shalom", "Am Yisrael Chai")
