= Sha Shtil =

Yiddish folk song

Song
- Language: Yiddish
- Songwriter: unknown

"Sha, Shtil, Makht Nisht Keyn Gerider!" (Shh, hush, don’t make any noise; Yiddish: שאַ, שטיל, מאַכט נישט קײן גערידער) is a Yiddish folk song, written and composed by unknown authors. In World War II, the song was adapted and sung during the Holocaust.

== Lyrics and translation ==
Yiddish

שאַ, שטיל, מאַכט נישט קײן גערידער
דער רבי גײט שױן טאַנצן װידער
שאַ, שטיל, מאַכט נישט קײן געװאַלט
.דער רבי גײט שױן טאַנצן באַלד

און אַז דער רבי טאַנצט
טאַנצן מיט די װענט
.לאָמיר אַלע פּליעסקען מיט די הענט

און אַז דער רבי טאַנצט
טאַנצט דאָך מיט דער טיש
.לאָמיר אַלע קלאַפּן מיט די פֿיס

און אַז דער רבי זינגט
דעם הײליקן ניגון
.בלײַבט דער שׂטן אַ טױטער ליגן

Transliteration

Sha, shtil, makht nisht keyn gerider,
Der rebe geyt shoyn tantsn vider;
Sha, shtil, makht nisht keyn gevalt,
Der rebe geyt shoyn tantsn bald.

Un az der rebe tantst,
Tantsn mit di vent,
Lomir ale plyesken mit di hent.

Un az der rebe tantst,
Tantst dokh mit der tish,
Lomir ale klapn mit di fis.

Un az der rebe zingt
Dem heylikn nign,
Blaybt der sotn a toyter lign.

Translation

Shh, hush, don’t make any noise.
The Rabbi is going to dance again.
Shh, hush, don’t make a “gevalt”
The Rabbi is about to dance.

And when the Rabbi dances,
The walls dance with him.
Let’s all clap our hands.

And when the Rabbi dances,
The table dances with him.
Let’s all stamp our feet.

And when the Rabbi sings
the holy melody,
Satan lies dead.

The song depicts the atmosphere in a hasidic community. The melody starts with an augmented second, which is typical of the so-called gypsy scale.

== History ==
According to an eye-witness account, the words to the original melody were adapted during police actions in the Holocaust as follows: “Sha, shtil, makh nit keyn gerider,/ S’iz in lager a kontrol vider./ Sha, shtil, makh nit keyn gevald,/ Di kontrol kumt aher bald./ Un az di kontrol kumt iz dokh vey un vind, / Men darf in lager nit zen keyn kind.” (Shh, hush, don't make any noise, the guard is coming again; shh, hush, don't make a clamor, the guard is coming soon. And when the guard comes, it's woe to us — no child in the camp should be seen.)

The Israeli Yiddish metal band Gevolt has recorded Sha, shtil on its album AlefBase.
