= Tumbalalaika =

Russian Jewish folk song

"Tumbalalaika", "Tum balalaika" or "Tum balalayke" (Yiddish: טום־באַלאַלײַקע) is an American Ashkenazi Jewish popular love song in the Yiddish language. The title refers to the balalaika, a three-stringed musical instrument of Russian origin. The song was written by Abraham Ellstein for The Barry Sisters, and was published by him in 1940. Its text was loosely based on a traditional Ukrainian song, "Letiv Ptashok".

== Lyrics ==
Yiddish

שטײט אַ בחור און ער טראַכט,
(או: שטײט אַ בחור, שטײט און טראַכט)
טראַכט און טראַכט אַ גאַנצע נאַכט:
וועמען צו נעמען און ניט פֿאַרשעמען,
וועמען צו נעמען און ניט פֿאַרשעמען?

טום־באַלאַ, טום־באַלאַ, טום־באַלאַלײַקע
טום־באַלאַ, טום־באַלאַ, טום־באַלאַלײַקע
טום־באַלאַלײַקע, שפּיל באַלאַלײַקע,
טום־באַלאַלײַקע, פֿריילעך זאָל זײַן!
(או: שפּיל באַלאַלײַקע, פֿריילעך זאָל זײַן!)

מיידל, מיידל, כ'וויל בײַ דיר פֿרעגן:
וואָס קען וואַקסן, וואַקסן אָן רעגן?
וואָס קען ברענען און ניט אויפֿהערן?
וואָס קען בענקען, וויינען אָן טרערן?

טום־באַלאַ, טום־באַלאַ...

נאַרישער בחור, וואָס דאַרפֿסטו פֿרעגן?
אַ שטיין קען וואַקסן, וואַקסן אָן רעגן,
ליבע קען ברענען און ניט אויפֿהערן,
אַ האַרץ קען בענקען, וויינען אָן טרערן!

טום־באַלאַ, טום־באַלאַ...

וואָס איז העכער פֿון אַ הויז?
וואָס איז פֿלינקער פֿון אַ מויז?
וואָס איז טיפֿער פֿון אַ קוואַל?
וואָס איז ביטער, ביטערער ווי גאַל?

טום־באַלאַ, טום־באַלאַ...

אַ קוימען איז העכער פֿון אַ הויז,
אַ קאַץ איז פֿלינקער פֿון אַ מויז,
די תּורה איז טיפֿער פֿון אַ קוואַל,
דער טויט איז ביטער, ביטערער ווי גאַל!

טום־באַלאַ, טום־באַלאַ...

Transliteration

Shteyt a bokher, un er trakht (also shteyt un trakht)
Trakht un trakht a gantse nakht
Vemen tzu nemen un nit farshemen
Vemen tzu nemen un nit farshemen

(chorus)

Tumbala, Tumbala, Tumbalalaika
Tumbala, Tumbala, Tumbalalaika
Tumbalalaika, shpil balalaika
Tumbalalaika (also Shpil balalaika), freylekh zol zayn

Meydl, meydl, kh'vil bay dir fregn,
Vos ken vaksn, vaksn on regn?
Vos ken brenen un nit oyfhern?
Vos ken benken, veynen on trern?

(chorus)

Narisher bokher, vos darfstu fregn?
A shteyn ken vaksn, vaksn on regn.
Libe ken brenen un nit oyfhern.
A harts ken benken, veynen on trern.

(chorus)

Vos iz hekher fun a hoyz?
Vos iz flinker fun a moyz?
Vos iz tifer fun a kval?
Vos iz biter, biterer vi gal?

(chorus)

A koymen iz hekher fun a hoyz.
A kats iz flinker fun a moyz.
Di toyre iz tifer fun a kval.
Der toyt iz biter, biterer vi gal.

(chorus)

Translation

A young lad stands, and he thinks
Thinks and thinks the whole night through
Whom to take and not to shame
Whom to take and not to shame

(chorus)

Tumbala, Tumbala, Tumbalalaika
Tumbala, Tumbala, Tumbalalaika
Tumbalalaika, strum balalaika
Tumbalalaika, may we be happy

Girl, girl, I want to ask of you
What can grow, grow without rain?
What can burn and never end?
What can yearn, cry without tears?

(chorus)

Foolish lad, why do you have to ask?
A stone can grow, grow without rain
Love can burn and never end
A heart can yearn, cry without tears

(chorus)

What is higher than a house?
What is swifter than a mouse?
What is deeper than a well?
What is bitter, more bitter than gall?

(chorus)

A chimney is higher than a house
A cat is swifter than a mouse
The Torah is deeper than a well
Death is bitter, more bitter than gall

(chorus)

=== Meaning ===
While most versions use a shteyn ('a stone') as the answer to "what can grow without rain", some versions use farshteyn ('understanding').

== Cultural references and covers ==
- The song "Over and Over" by Nana Mouskouri uses this melody. It followed the singer's French version "Roule s'enroule" (lyrics by Michel Jourdan).
- The song "Tumbalalaika (The Riddle)" by Natalia Zukerman is a poetic adaptation of this to English, with the chorus remaining in Yiddish.
- The Barry Sisters version of the song appears in episode 5, season 2 ("Midnight At The Concord") of The Marvelous Mrs. Maisel.
- Benny Hill adapted the melody for one of his own compositions, "Anna Marie," which he performed on his first special for Thames Television on November 19, 1969.
- The film Khrustalyov, My Car! shows a young Jewish boy singing the song in Russian.
- The song is used in the film Swing by Tony Gatlif.
- The song is used in the play Angels in America: A Gay Fantasia on National Themes by Tony Kushner and the film based on this play. It is sung by the ghost of Ethel Rosenberg to Roy Cohn, dying of AIDS.
- The song is used in the film Prendimi l'anima/The Soul Keeper (2002) by Roberto Faenza.
- A metal version of the song is included in the first Metal Yiddish album AlefBase by Gevolt, released in March 2011.
- A pastiche of the song is used in the play The Hamlet of Stepney Green: A Sad Comedy with Some Songs by Bernard Kops.
- The song is included in the album Homenatge a Xesco Boix, a tribute to Xesco Boix. The latter used to play in his concerts for children. Also included in Cançons catalanes de Folk in 1976 (Terra Nostra).
- The song appears in the novel The City Beautiful by Aden Polydoros.
- A Vietnamese version, "Tình Nồng Cháy" (Passioned love), with lyrics by Anh Bằng, based on the English lyrics of "Over and Over", uses this melody.
- The Berlin-based electro swing duo Masha Ray covered the song in 2023.
- The song is used in the film Fanny's Journey during the closing credits, and is heard in the middle of the film sung by some of the cast.
