= Alexey Arkhipovsky =

Russian balalaika player

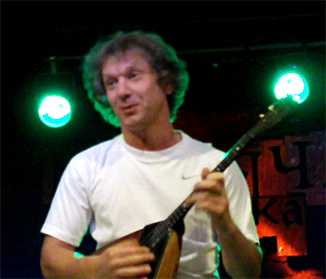

Background information
- Born: Alexey Vitalyevich Arkhipovsky; 15 May 1967 (age 59); Tuapse, Krasnodar Krai, Russian SFSR, Soviet Union
- Genres: jazz, folk music, Ethnic Russian music
- Instrument: balalaika
- Website: http://www.arkhipovskiy.com

Alexey Vitalyevich Arkhipovsky (also spelled as Arhipovskiy, Russian: Алексей Витальевич Архиповский; born 15 May 1967) is a modern-day Russian balalaika player.

== Personal life ==
Alexey Arkhipovsky was born in 1967 in the town of Tuapse, Krasnodar Krai, Russian SFSR, Soviet Union. His father was passionate for music and played the garmon and the accordion. At the age of nine Arkhipovsky started to take balalaika lessons at a music school. In 1982, he entered the Gnessin State Musical College, the department of folk instruments, and studied the balalaika under Valery Zazhigin.

== Musical career ==
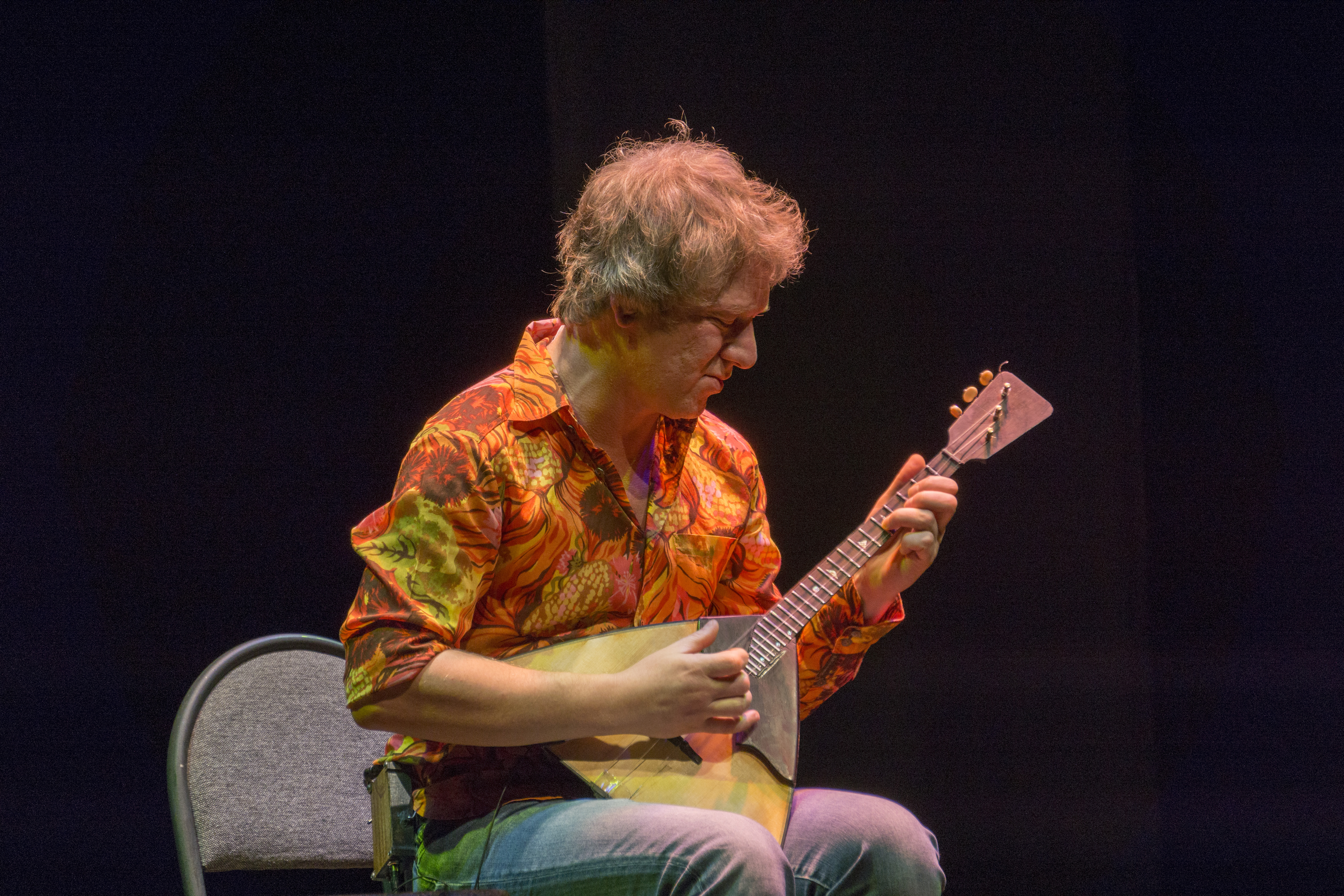
Arkhipovsky performing in 2014

In 1985 Arkhipovsky became a laureate of the Contest of Folk Instrument Performers in Russia. Upon completing his studies, he joined the Smolensk Folk Orchestra as a balalaika soloist. From 1998 on he toured around Russia and abroad with the State Academic Folk Ensemble "Rossiya" directed by Lyudmila Zykina.

Starting from 2002, he cooperated with Stas Namin, the musician, composer, and record producer. As a soloist-performer, Alexey Arkhipovsky took part in Russian culture festivals in the United States, China, South Korea, Germany, France, Spain and Bulgaria. He participated in jazz festivals in Russia and abroad, in radio and TV programmes.

In 2004 The New York Times remarked that Alexei Arkhipovsky's balalaika solo on weeklong Russian Nights Festival, (was) full of impressive irony and virtuosity. In August 2006 the Dutch daily «De Volkskrant» commented about Arhipovsky participating in the Jazz Zomer Fiets Tour in Groningen : “Arhipovsky is a mix of such guitar’s gods as Jeff Beck and Steve Vai and this on a traditional triangular and three stringed folk instrument. His technique catches breath; his sound is all-spacious. The sparkling expressiveness in his rendering of traditional melodies sets your teeth on edge”.

In 2009, he was invited to participate in the opening ceremony of the second semi final of the Eurovision Song Contest in Moscow.

The reactions to his performance included comparisons to Niccolò Paganini but with a Pat Metheny approach.

== Original discography ==
- DVD album “Alexey Arhipovsky” 2009
