= Avinu Malkeinu =

Jewish prayer

Live recording of Avinu Malkeinu during Yom Kippur Morning Service at the Hebrew Union College in Jerusalem

Avinu Malkeinu (Hebrew: אָבִינוּ מַלְכֵּנוּ; "Our Father, Our King") is a Jewish prayer recited during Jewish services during the Ten Days of Repentance, from Rosh Hashanah through Yom Kippur inclusive. Since the 17th century, most Eastern Ashkenazi Jewish communities recite it on all ta'aniyot (תַּעֲנִיּוֹת, 'fast days'), as well; in the Sephardic and Western Ashkenazic traditions (as well as a very few Eastern Ashkenazic communities), it is recited only during the Ten Days of Repentance.

Joseph H. Hertz (died 1946), Chief Rabbi of the United Hebrew Congregations of the Commonwealth, described it as "the oldest and most moving of all the litanies of the Jewish Year". It makes use of two sobriquets for God that appear separately in the Hebrew Bible: "Our Father" (Isaiah 63:16) and "Our King" (Isaiah 33:22).

== History ==
The Talmud, in tractate Ta'anit 25b, records Rabbi Akiva (d. 135 CE) reciting two verses each beginning "Our Father, Our King" in a prayer to end a drought (apparently successfully). In a much later compilation of Talmudic notes, published circa 1515, this is expanded to five verses. It is very probable that, at first, there was no set number of verses, no sequence, nor perhaps any fixed text. Apparently, an early version had the verses in alphabetic sequence, which would mean 22 verses. The prayer book of Amram Gaon (9th century) had 25 verses. Mahzor Vitry (early 12th century) has more than 40 verses and added the explanation that the prayer accumulated additional verses that were added ad hoc on various occasions and thereafter retained. Presently, the Sephardic tradition has 29 verses, among the Mizrahi Jews the Syrian tradition has 31 or 32 verses, but the Yemenite has only 27 verses, the Salonika has as many as 53 verses, the Western Ashkenazic has 38 verses, the Polish tradition has 44 verses, all with different sequences. And within traditions, some verses change depending on the occasion, such as the Ten Days of Repentance, including Rosh Hashanah and the bulk of Yom Kippur (when it is generally said kotvenu, "inscribe us"), or the Ne'ila Yom Kippur service (chotmenu, "seal us"), or a lesser fast day (zokhreinu, "remember us").

== Practice ==
Each line of the prayer begins with the words "Avinu Malkeinu" ["Our Father, Our King"] and is then followed by varying phrases, mostly supplicatory. There is often a slow, chanting, repetitive aspect to the melody to represent the pious pleading within the prayer.

There is a wide variation of the order of the verses in different communities. In the printed Eastern Ashkenazic rite, there are 44 verses, whereas in the printed Western Ashkenazic rite, there are only 38. In the Western Ashkenazic rite, all verses (except the last one) are recited responsively, first by the leader and then repeated by the congregation, and on Rosh Hashanah and Yom Kippur they are sung in tunes that change from line to line; in most Eastern Ashkenazic communities, only Verses 15-23 (in some communities only 19–23) are recited responsively. In the Eastern Ashkenazic rite, the reader also reads the last verse aloud (and sometimes it is sung by the entire congregation) but, traditionally, in a whisper, as it is a supplication; in the Western Ashkenazic rite, the last line is recited silently, as the words "we have no [good] actions" are considered inappropriate to declare out loud.

On most days when Avinu Malkeinu is recited, it is included during Shacharit and Mincha on that day. In the Ashkenazic rite, Avinu Malkeinu is never recited on Shabbat (except in Ne'ila), and it is also omitted at Mincha on Fridays. On Erev Yom Kippur, Ashkenazim do not recite Avinu Malkeinu, although if Yom Kippur falls on Shabbat (and Avinu Malkeinu will be recited only at Ne'ila), most communities recite it in on Friday (Erev Yom Kippur) morning. On Yom Kippur, Ashkenazim also recite Avinu Malkeinu during Maariv and Ne'ila (and some communities omit the prayer in Mincha on Yom Kippur). In non-Ashkenazic rites, Avinu Malkeinu is recited at Shacharit and Mincha during the Ten Days of Repentance, including Shabbat, Friday afternoon and Erev Yom Kippur; it is also recited on Yom Kippur itself only at Shacharit and Mincha as on other days (in the Italian rite, it is also recited at Ne'ila).

In the Eastern Ashkenazic rite, the Ark is opened during Avinu Malkeinu, and at the end of the prayer, the Ark is closed; in the Western Ashkenazic rite, the Ark is opened only on Rosh Hashanah in the morning and during all of the prayers on Yom Kippur, but not on Rosh Hashanah in the afternoon or the rest of the Ten Days of Repentance. In the Sephardic tradition the Ark is not opened, and each community follows received customs about whether to say it on Shabbat.

Throughout the Ten Days of Repentance, five lines of Avinu Malkeinu that refer to various heavenly books include the word kotveinu ("Inscribe us"). In the Ashkenazic rite, this is replaced during Ne'ila with chotmeinu ("seal us"). This reflects the belief that on Rosh Hashanah all is written and revealed and on Yom Kippur all decrees for the coming year are sealed. In communities which recite Avinu Malkeinu on Fast Days (other than the Fast of Gedaliah which falls in the days of Penitence), the phrase barech aleinu ("bless us") in the 4th verse is recited instead of the usual chadesh aleinu ("renew us"), and Zochreinu le-... ("remember us for") is recited in verses 19–23 in place of kotveinu b'sefer ("inscribe us in the book"). Fast days on which it is not recited (by any custom) are Tisha B'Av, the afternoon of the Fast of Esther except when it is brought forward (thus not falling immediately before Purim), and when the afternoon of the 10th of Tevet falls on a Friday.

Sephardic Jews and Western Ashkenazic Jews (as well as some Eastern Ashkenazic and Hasidic communities) do not recite Avinu Malkeinu on fast days (except those that fall in the days of Penitence).

In the interests of gender neutrality, the UK Liberal Jewish prayer-book for Rosh Hashanah and Yom Kippur (Machzor Ruach Chadashah) translates the epithet as "Our Creator, Our Sovereign". It also contains a contemporary prayer based on Avinu Malkeinu in which the feminine noun Shekhinah is featured. The Reform Jewish High Holy Days prayer book Mishkan HaNefesh, released in 2015 and intended as a companion to Mishkan T'filah, includes a version of Avinu Malkeinu that refers to God as both "Loving Father" and "Compassionate Mother". According to traditional Orthodox Judaism this change is not acceptable because Hebrew prayer is very exact in its meaning. The word Shechinah in Hebrew, for example does not mean God, but expresses a loving, ever present relationship between God and man. The above change to the word sovereign would also be masculine in Hebrew and would indicate severe judgement as in Moshel which indicates harsh judgement. According to traditional Hebrew, the prayers to the deity as Sovereign and Presence would summon harsh judgement as the form of love for the penitent. It is for this reason that these changes are rejected by Traditional Judaism.

== In popular culture ==
In 2018, composer Henry Panion incorporated the main theme into his Dreams of Hope for Solo Violin & Orchestra, commissioned for performance by violinist Caitlin Edwards and premiered during the opening of Violins of Hope Birmingham at the historic 16th Street Baptist Church, the site of the infamous bombing that killed four black girls in 1963.

The band Mogwai's instrumental My Father My King sets its main melody to "Avinu Malkeinu".

The duo Shlomit & RebbeSoul (Bruce Burger and Shlomit Levi) perform an acoustic version on their debut album, The Seal Of Solomon (2015), while Burger himself has included a version of the song on nearly all of his albums.

The band Phish plays the song in a 5/4 time signature (titled "Avenu Malkenu").

Barbra Streisand sings the song. (There is a remix by Offer Nissim.)

In the 1992 film School Ties, the headmaster of the WASP elitist prep school walks in on David Greene reciting "Avinu Malkeinu" on Rosh Hashanah. (David is a Jewish student on an athletic scholarship to the school who deals with antisemitism by practicing Judaism clandestinely.) The Christian headmaster shows a profound understanding of the spiritual and ethical import of the Jewish High Holidays.

The prayer is titled "Aveenu Malcainu" and appears on the 2002 album "Zero Church" by sisters Suzzy and Maggie Roche.

The singer/songwriter Lior also performs the song at many of his live concerts. It is recorded on his live album, Doorways of My Mind (2006).

Singer Lena Måndotter recorded "Avinu Malkeinu" on her album Songs from the River (Rootsy/Warner Music, 2009).

In 2013, Stephen DeCesare, a Roman Catholic composer, wrote a version dedicated to Cantor Fred Scheff of Temple Shalom in Middletown, Rhode Island.

The Israeli heavy metal band Orphaned Land incorporates "Avinu Malkeinu" into the song "Our Own Messiah" from their 2013 album All Is One.

Composer/singer Rebecca Teplow wrote a version of Avinu Malkeinu in 2017.

In 2017, Benzion Miller's version of "Avinu Malkeinu" was featured in the 5th episode of season three of the television show The Leftovers.

American Belz Hasidic singer Shulem Lemmer covered the song in his album The Perfect Dream, released in 2019.

In July 2020, Rabbi David Lau, the Chief Rabbi of Israel, along with Rabbi Chaim Kanievsky, announced that the Avinu Malkeinu prayer shall be recited twice a day, at Shacharit and at Mincha, in light of the spread of coronavirus in Israel.
