= AlefBase =

Studio album by Gevolt
- Released: March 25, 2011
- Recorded: 2005–2010
- Genres: Folk, industrial metal, Yiddish metal
- Length: 49:26
- Language: Yiddish
- Label: Gevolt Productions
- Producer: Gevolt

Professional ratings
Review scores
Source	Rating
Metal Storm	(8.9/10)
Today's Metal (in Bulgarian)	7.5/10 stars
Darkside.ru (in Russian)	8/10 stars

AlefBase is the second album by the Israeli metal band Gevolt. Released on 25 March 2011, the album was the first full-length metal album in Yiddish language. All tracks are based on Yiddish folk songs such as Tum Balalayke and Zog Nit Keyn Mol.

The album's genre was declared as Yiddish Metal, but it has also been described as Neue Deutsche Härte.

AlefBase was available for free download on Gevolt's website for free on 25 February 2011, one month before the official release date. The free download remained for several years thereafter.

The album was released to positive reception in both music media and Jewish media. Such sources as American newspaper The Forward and German Die Welt mentioned the new phenomenon of Yiddish metal in their articles.

The track "Bay Mir Bistu Sheyn" was featured in April 2011 by Music Alliance Pact.

In 2016, AlefBase was inducted into the Freedman Jewish Sound Archive at the University of Pennsylvania's Van Pelt Library.

== Track listing ==
No.	Title	Length
1.	"Hakdome"	0:32
2.	"Trinken A Bisale Vayn"	3:13
3.	"Der Rebe Elimelekh"	3:04
4.	"Sha Shtil"	4:01
5.	"Tum Balalayke"	3:37
6.	"Shpil Zhe Mir A Lidele in Yiddish"	5:09
7.	"Mayn Rue Plats (My Resting Place)"	5:09
8.	"Zog Nit Keyn Mol"	4:06
9.	"A Mol Iz Geven A Mayse"	4:40
10.	"Sheyn Vi Di Levone"	3:18
11.	"Bay Mir Bistu Sheyn"	4:30
12.	"Tshiribim Tshiribom"	3:55
13.	"Der Alefbeys"	3:34

== Personnel ==
=== Band members ===
- Anatholy Bonder − vocals
- Michael Gimmervert − guitars, strange banjo
- Mark Lekhovitser − bass guitars
- Vadim Weinstein − drums
- Dmitry Lifshitz − keyboards
- Eva Yefremov − violins

=== Guest musicians ===
- Yevgeny Kushnir − clean guitars/guitar FX on 5, 6, 7, 8, 9, 11 / oud on 11 / Help in arrangements in 1, 2, 4, 5, 6, 7, 8, 9, 11
- Max Mann − bass guitars on 1, 2, 4, 5, 6, 7, 8, 9, 11 / Help in arrangements in 1, 2, 4, 5, 6, 7, 8, 9, 11
- Marina Klionski − Help in arrangements in 5, 6, 8
- Anna Agre − Help in arrangements in 2, 4, 8, 9
- Oleg Szumski − drums adds on 5, 8 / Help in arrangements in 5, 8

=== Production ===
- Recorded in "Muzikansky" studio (Ashdod, Israel), "Tsolelet" studio (Tel Aviv, Israel), "Soundroll" studio (Givataim, Israel) and "Taketwoo" studio (Kiryat Ono, Israel), 2005–2010
- Produced by Gevolt
- Engineered by Gevolt
- Mixed and premastered by Gevolt, 2010–2011
- Illustrations concept by Leonid Polonsky
- Art and design by Mark Lekhovitser
- Yiddish consulting by Leybl Botwinik
