= Balalaika =

Russian stringed musical instrument

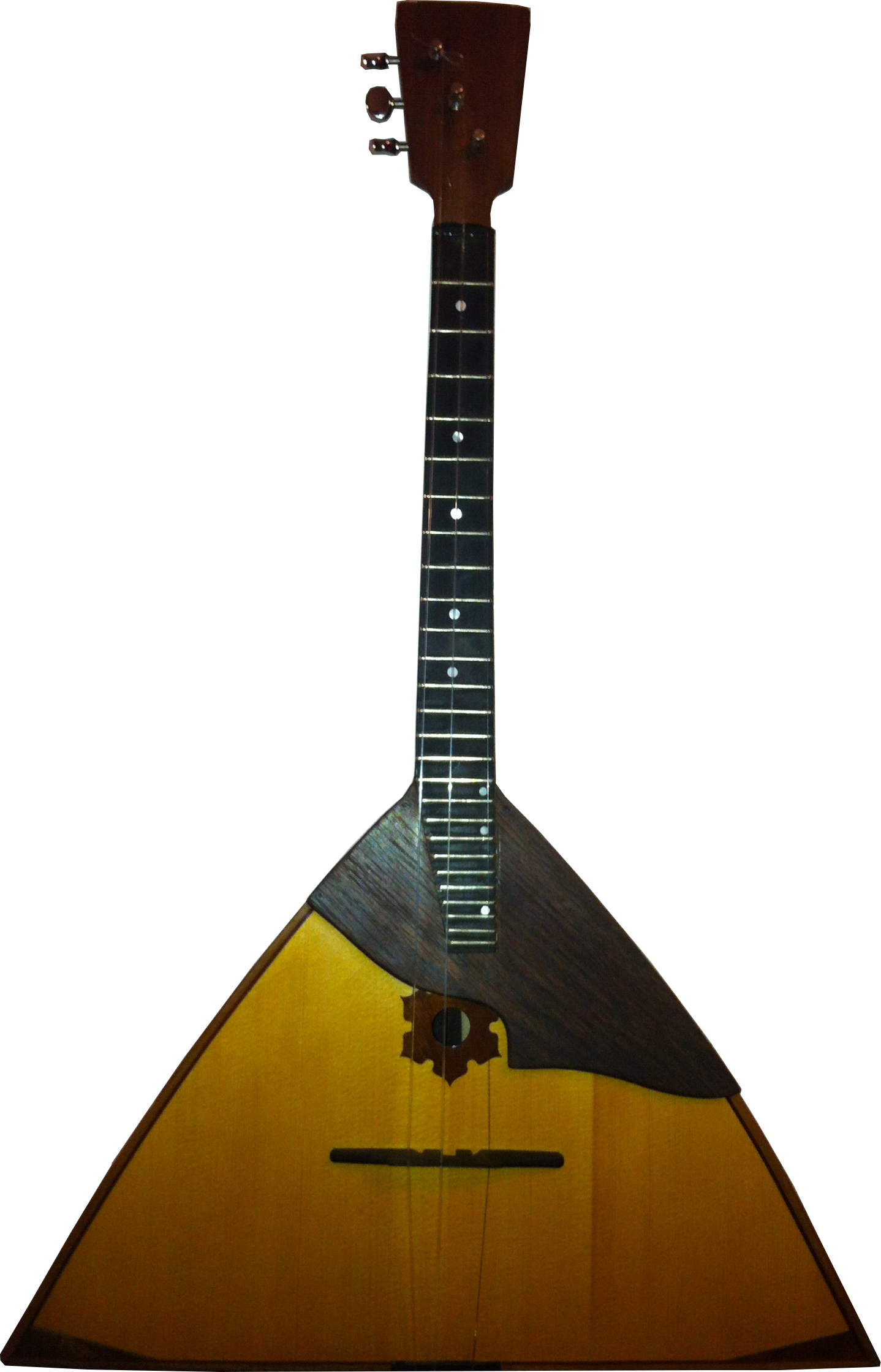
- 3-string prima balalaika

String instrument
- Classification: Plucked string instrument
- Hornbostel–Sachs classification: 321.321 (Composite chordophone)
- Developed: Late 18th to early 19th centuries late 20th century

Playing range

Related instruments
- Bağlama; Dombra; Domra; Panduri; Tovshuur

More articles or information
- Pronunciation

The balalaika (Russian: балала́йка, pronounced [bəɫɐˈɫajkə]) Balalaika is a Russian stringed musical instrument with a characteristic triangular wooden, hollow body, fretted neck, and three strings. Two strings are usually tuned to the same note and the third string is a perfect fourth higher. The higher-pitched balalaikas are used to play melodies and chords. The instrument generally has a short sustain, necessitating rapid strumming or plucking when it is used to play melodies. Balalaikas are often used for Russian folk music and dancing.

The balalaika family of instruments includes instruments of various sizes, from the highest-pitched to the lowest: the piccolo balalaika, prima balalaika, secunda balalaika, alto balalaika, bass balalaika, and contrabass balalaika. There are balalaika orchestras which consist solely of different balalaikas; these ensembles typically play classical music that has been arranged for balalaikas. The prima balalaika is the most common; the piccolo is rare. There have also been descant and tenor balalaikas, but these are considered obsolete. All have three-sided bodies; spruce, evergreen, or fir tops; and backs made of three to nine wooden sections (usually maple).

The prima, secunda, and alto balalaikas are played either with the fingers or a plectrum (pick), depending on the music being played, and the bass and contrabass (equipped with extension legs that rest on the floor) are played with leather plectra. The rare piccolo instrument is usually played with a pick.

== Etymology ==
The earliest mention of the term balalaika dates back to a 1688 arrest document. Another appearance of the word is found in a claim dated October 1700 in what is now the Verkhotursky district of Russia. Peter the Great requested balalaika performers to play at the wedding celebrations of Nikita Zotov in Saint Petersburg.

In the Ukrainian language, the word was first documented in the 18th century as "balabaika"; this form is also present in South Russian dialects and the Belarusian language, as well as in Siberian Russia.

== Types ==
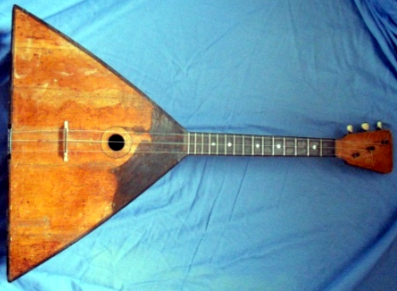
Secunda size

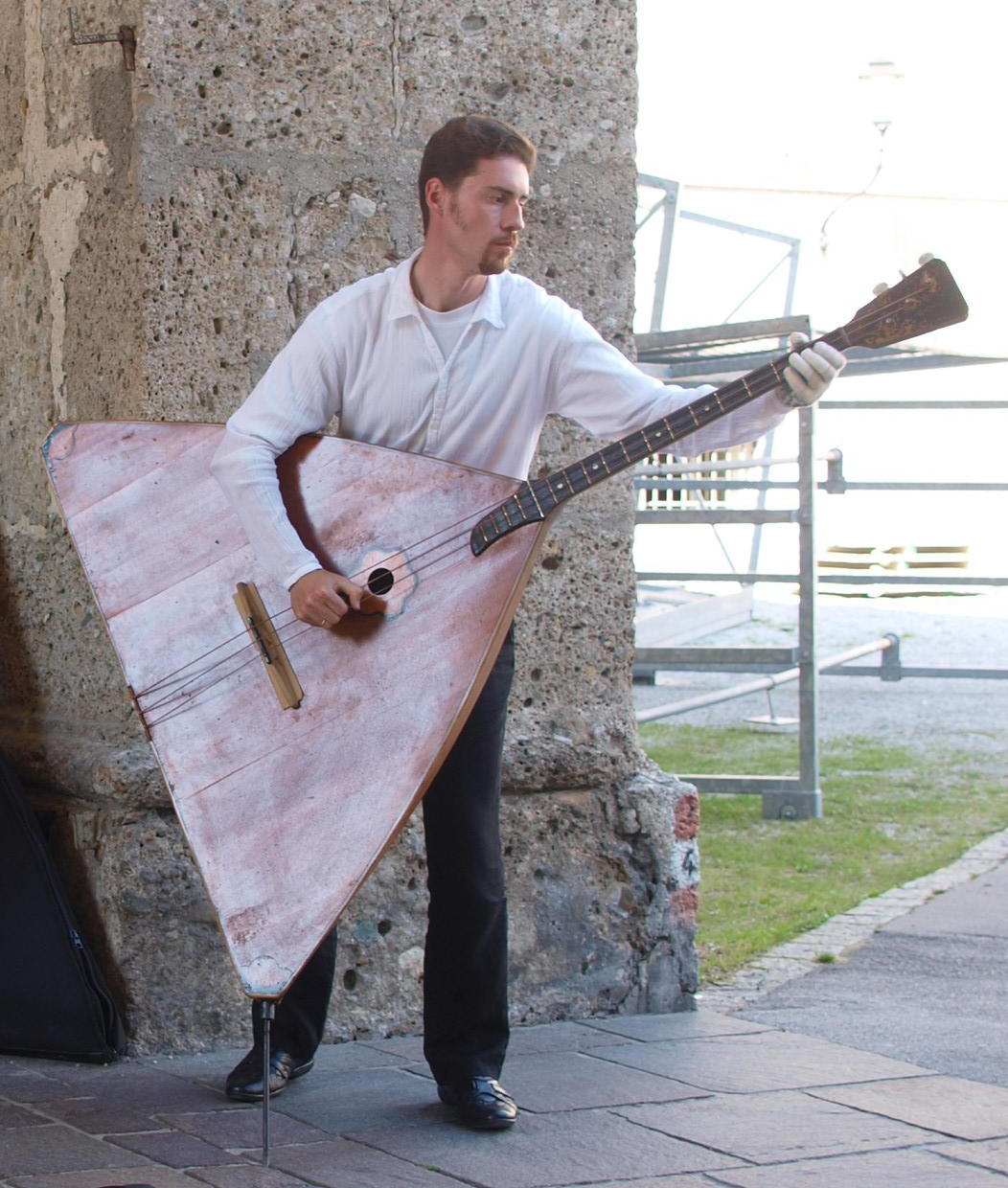
Contrabass size

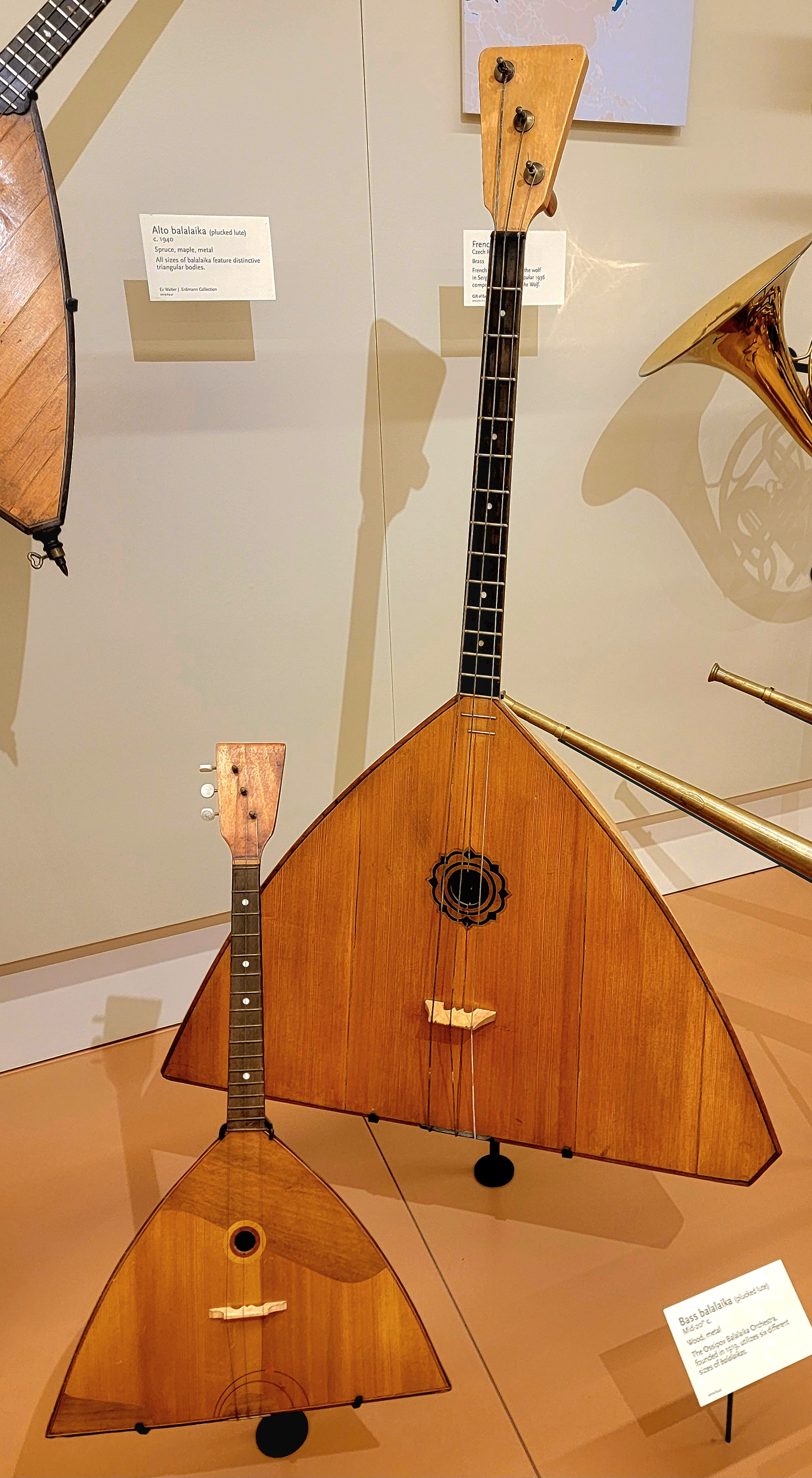
A prima balalaika and a bass balalaika

The most common solo instrument is the prima, which is tuned E_{4}–E_{4}–A_{4} (thus the two lower strings are tuned to the same pitch). Sometimes the balalaika is tuned "guitar style" by folk musicians to G_{3}–B_{3}–D_{4} (mimicking the three highest strings of the Russian guitar), whereby it is easier to play for Russian guitar players, although classically trained balalaika purists avoid this tuning. It can also be tuned to E_{4}–A_{4}–D_{5}, like its cousin, the domra, to make it easier for those trained on the domra to play the instrument, and still have a balalaika sound. The folk (pre-Andreev) tunings D_{4}–F♯_{4}–A_{4} and C_{4}–E_{4}–G_{4} were very popular, as this makes it easier to play certain riffs.

Balalaikas have been made in the following sizes:

Name	Length	Common tuning
descant (Note: Obsolete)	c. 46 cm (18 in)	E_{5} E_{5} A_{5}
piccolo (Note: Rare)	c. 61 cm (24 in)	B_{4} E_{5} A_{5}
prima (Note: Members of the modern balalaika orchestra)	66–69 cm (26–27 in)	E_{4} E_{4} A_{4}
secunda (Note: Secundas are often the same instrument as primas, just tuned to a lower pitch range)	68–74 cm (27–29 in)	A_{3} A_{3} D_{4}
alto	81 cm (32 in)	E_{3} E_{3} A_{3}
tenor	91–97 cm (36–38 in)	A_{2} A_{2} D_{3}
bass	104 cm (41 in)	E_{2} A_{2} D_{3}
contrabass	130–165 cm (51–65 in)	E_{1} A_{1} D_{2}

Factory-made six-string prima balalaikas with three sets of double courses are also common. These have three double courses similar to the stringing of the mandolin and often use a "guitar" tuning.

Four-string alto balalaikas are also encountered and are used in the orchestra of the Piatnistky Folk Choir.

The piccolo, prima, and secunda balalaikas were originally strung with gut with the thinnest melody string made of stainless steel. Today, nylon strings are commonly used in place of gut.

Amateur and/or souvenir-style prima balalaikas usually have a total of 16 frets, while in professional orchestra-like ones that number raises to 24.

=== Technique ===
On the prima, the most characteristic way of playing is strumming, with regular down and up strokes of the right index finger across all the strings. The same finger plays the tremolo with fast up and down strokes, and in pizzicato the right thumb plays the down strokes and the index finger the up strokes. The left thumb frets notes on the third string, while the other fingers fret the first and second strings.

Most balalaikas in the orchestra are played with the fingers, but the bass and contrabass are played with a leather plectrum. On the contrabass a large, solid leather plectrum is recommended to give a full tremolo without rattling. Bass and contrabass balalaikas rest on the ground, on a wooden or metal pin that is drilled into one corner.

== History ==
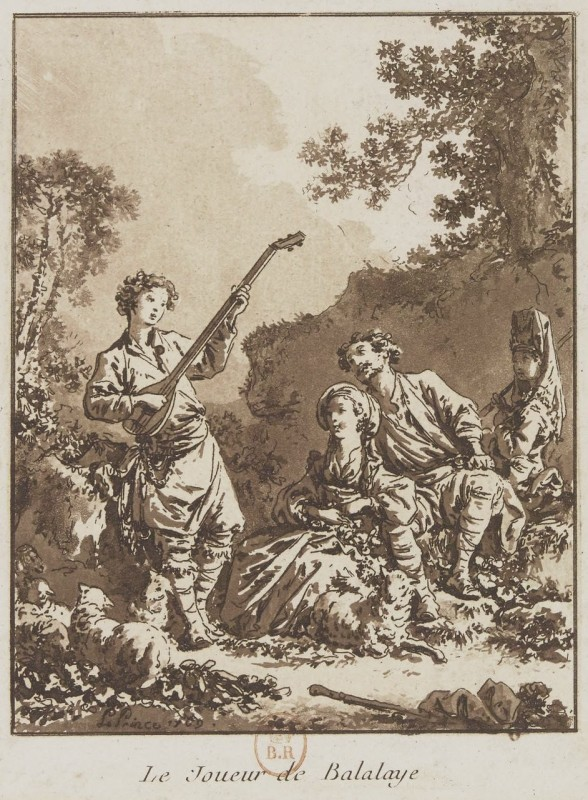
Jean-Baptiste Le Prince, Balalaika Player, 1769

Some theories say that the instrument is descended from the domra, an instrument from the East Slavs. In the Caucasus, similar instruments such as the Mongolian topshur, used in Kalmykia, and the Panduri used in Georgia are played. It is also similar to the Kazakh dombra, which has two strings.

Balalaika postal stamps

=== The pre-Andreyev period ===
Early representations of the balalaika show it with anywhere from two to six strings. Similarly, frets on earlier balalaikas were made of animal gut and tied to the neck so that they could be moved around by the player at will (as is the case with the modern saz, which allows for the playing distinctive to Turkish and Central Asian music).

The first known document mentioning the instrument dates back to 1688. A guard's logbook from the Moscow Kremlin records that two commoners were stopped from playing the Balalaika whilst drunk. Further documents from 1700 and 1714 also mention the instrument. In the early 18th century the term appeared in Ukrainian documents, where it sounded like "Balabaika". Balalaika appeared in "Elysei", a 1771 poem by V. Maikov. In the 19th century, the balalaika evolved into a triangular instrument with a neck that was substantially shorter than that of its Asian counterparts. It was popular as a village instrument for centuries, particularly with the skomorokhs, sort of free-lance musical jesters whose tunes ridiculed the Tsar, the Russian Orthodox Church, and Russian society in general.

=== The Andreyev period ===
In the 1880s, Vasily Vasilievich Andreyev, who was then a professional violinist in the music salons of St Petersburg, developed what became the standardized balalaika, with the assistance of violin maker V. Ivanov. The instrument began to be used in his concert performances. A few years later, St. Petersburg craftsman Paserbsky further refined the instruments by adding a fully chromatic set of frets and also a number of balalaikas in orchestral sizes with the tunings now found in modern instruments. One of the reasons why the instruments were not standardised, was because people in the outlying areas built their own instruments because there was so little communication for them. There were no roads and weather conditions were generally bad. Andreyev patented the design and arranged numerous traditional Russian folk melodies for the orchestra. He also composed a body of concert pieces for the instrument.

== Balalaika orchestra ==
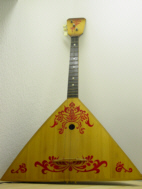
Souvenir style

The result of Andreyev's labours was the establishment of an orchestral folk tradition in Tsarist Russia, which later grew into a movement within the Soviet Union. The balalaika orchestra in its full form consists of balalaikas, domras, gusli, bayan, Vladimir Shepherd's Horns, garmoshkas, and several types of percussion instruments.

With the establishment of the Soviet system and the entrenchment of a proletarian cultural direction, the culture of the working classes (which included that of village labourers) was actively supported by the Soviet establishment. The concept of the balalaika orchestra was adopted wholeheartedly by the Soviet government as something distinctively proletarian (that is, from the working classes) and was also deemed progressive. Significant amounts of energy and time were devoted to support and foster the formal study of the balalaika, from which highly skilled ensemble groups such as the Osipov State Russian Folk Orchestra emerged. Balalaika virtuosi such as Boris Feoktistov and Pavel Necheporenko became stars both inside and outside the Soviet Union. The movement was so powerful that even the renowned Red Army Choir, which initially used a normal symphonic orchestra, changed its instrumentation, replacing violins, violas, and violoncellos with orchestral balalaikas and domras.

== Solo instrument ==
Often musicians perform solo on the balalaika. In particular, Alexey Arkhipovsky is well known for his solo performances. In particular, he was invited to play at the opening ceremony of the second semi final of the Eurovision Song Contest 2009 in Moscow because the organizers wanted to give a "more Russian appearance" to the contest.

== Notable players ==
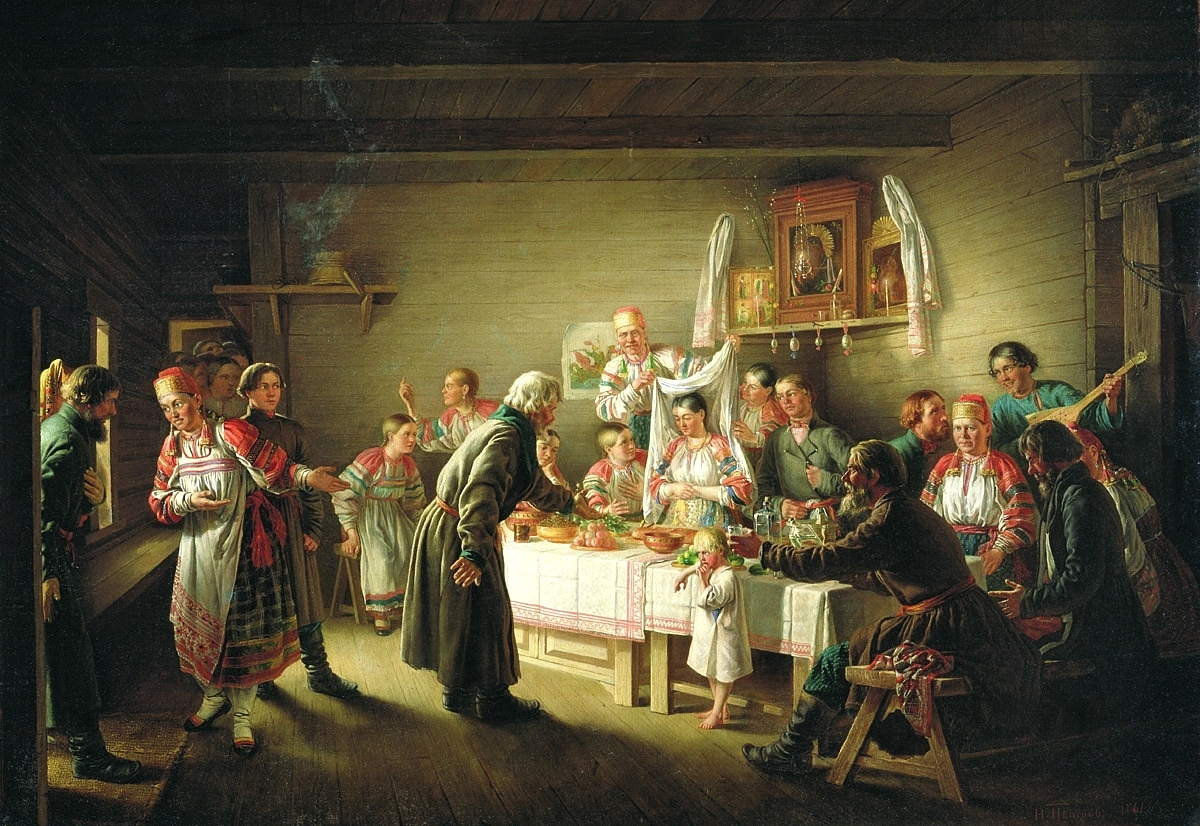
Painting from Nikolai Petrovich Petrov in 1861. The scene portrays the old Russian tradition of the bride-show while a balalaika is played.

See Category: Russian balalaika players (English Wikipedia) and a larger one in Russian

- Shaukat Amirov
- Vasily Andreyev
- Evgeniy Avksentyev
- Vasiliy Avksentyev
- Grigoriy Avksentyev
- Alexey Arkhipovsky
- Pavel Necheporenko
- Boris Troyanovskiy
- Andrey Gorbachev (modern balalaika soloist and educator)
- Lev Zabeginsky (New York-based balalaika virtuoso)
- Sergei Vashchenko (soloist, performer from Texas)
- Mikhail Smirnov (Russian balalaika player, ensemble leader)
- Sasha Ressetar (American balalaika virtuoso)
- Leonid Bruk (expert on contrabass balalaika)
- Simon Lemberskiy (balalaika soloist, Brooklyn)

== In popular culture ==
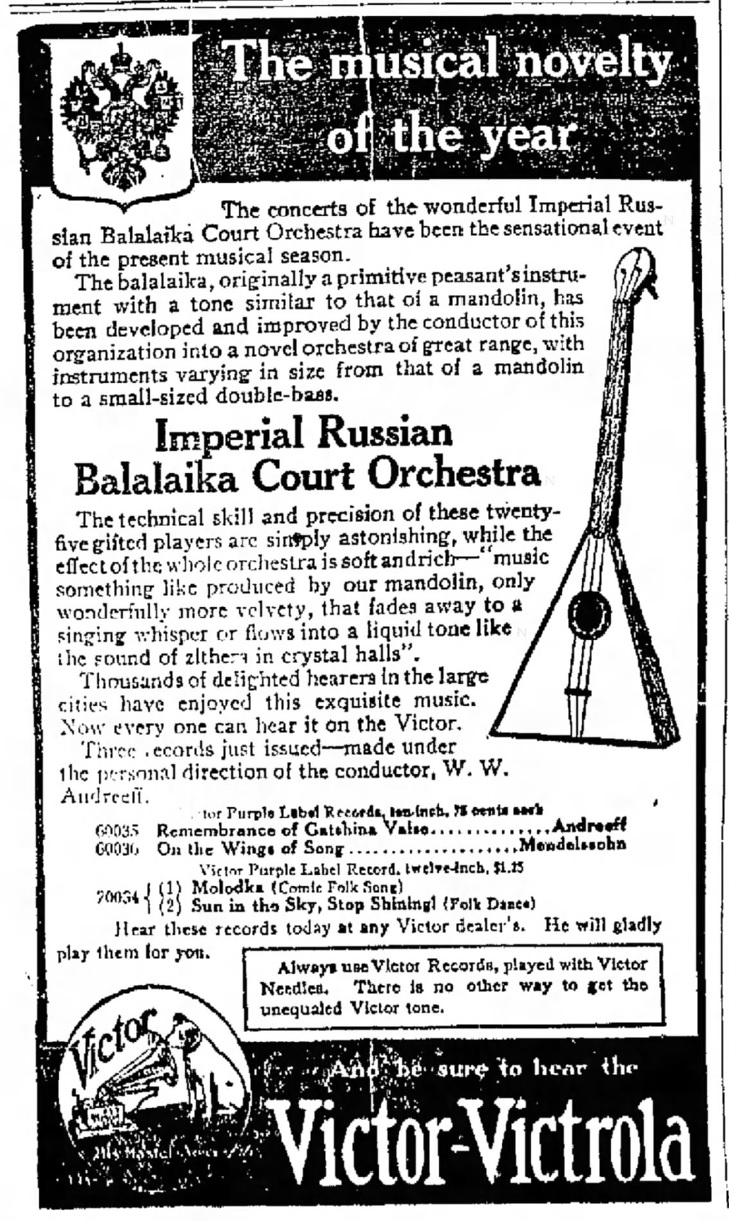
1911 advertisement for the Imperial Russian Balalaika Orchestra and Victor Records

Through the 20th century, interest in Russian folk instruments grew outside of Russia, likely as a result of western tours by Andreyev and other balalaika virtuosi early in the century. Significant balalaika associations are found in Washington, D.C., Los Angeles, New York, Atlanta and Seattle.

- Ian Anderson plays balalaika on two songs from the 1969 Jethro Tull album Stand Up: "Jeffrey Goes to Leicester Square" and "Fat Man".
- Wes Anderson's 2014 film The Grand Budapest Hotel (winner of the 87th Academy Award for Best Original Score) employs many balalaikas in both Alexandre Desplat's original score and several sound-track recordings by the Osipov State Russian Folk Orchestra.
- Oleg Bernov of the Russian-American rock band the Red Elvises played a red electrified contrabass balalaika during the band's North American tours. Dejah Sandoval currently tours with the Red Elvises and plays the bass balalaika.
- Kate Bush featured the balalaika (played by her brother Paddy Bush) in two of her Top-40 singles, "Babooshka" and "Running Up That Hill".
- Katzenjammer, the Norwegian all-girl pop band, uses two contrabass balalaikas, both of which have cat faces painted on the front. They are named Børge and Akerø.
- David Lean's 1965 film Doctor Zhivago features balalaika prominently in the score and the plot.
- VulgarGrad, an Australian band fronted by actor Jacek Koman, plays songs of the Russian criminal underground, and uses a contrabass balalaika.
- RebbeSoul plays the balalaika on numerous songs on the RebbeSoul albums Fringe Of Blue, RebbeSoul-O, Change The World With A Sound, and From Another World. He also plays the balalaika on the Common Tongue album Step Into My Word and on the Shlomit & RebbeSoul album The Seal Of Solomon.
- The instrument is featured in the episode "The Secret War" of the 2019 Netflix series Love, Death & Robots.
- The instrument is used alongside a piano and a bayan (a type of Russian accordion) in the piece "A Journey" from the soundtrack of the 2013 Japanese animated film The Wind Rises.
- Selo i Ludy, a Ukrainian folk band, utilises the balalaika.
- The instrument makes a brief appearance in Charlie Chaplin's 1931 film City Lights.
- The Beatles' song "Back in the U.S.S.R." includes the lyric "let me hear your balalaikas ringing out".
- "Wind of Change" by Scorpions includes the lyric "let your balalaika sing what my guitar wants to say ".
- The balalaika is played in "Boris the Blade Theme" from the 2000 comedy crime film Snatch directed by Guy Ritchie.
- It is featured in the soundtrack of Furious (2017 film)
- The Vampire Weekend song "Pravda" includes the lyric "I took the family balalaika".
- Featured in B. B. Gabor song "Moscow Drug Club" with the lyrics "You don't hear balalaikas, Because they're playing saxophone".
- Featured within American Dad Season 9 Episode 4 “Crotchwalkers”, as Roger and Haley create a balalaikas ensemble whilst discussing technical and cultural aspects of balalaikas.

== See also ==
- Gibson Flying V
- Timeline of Russian innovation
