= Maria Kong =

Israeli dance and performing arts company

Maria Kong is an Israeli dance and performing arts company. The group is known for including unusual visual and auditory theatrical effects in its shows through the use of digital technology.

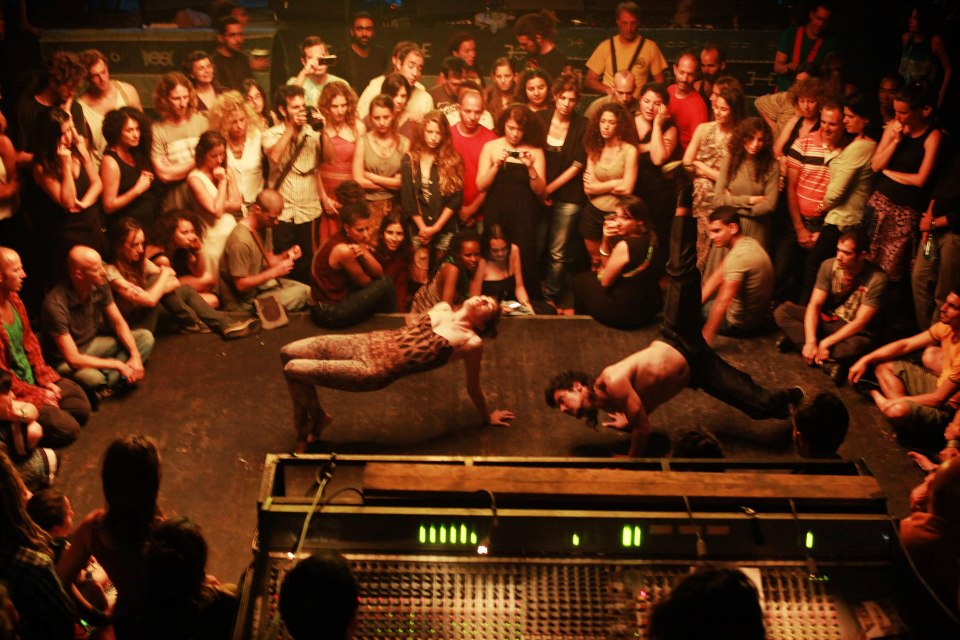
Animal Duet (tribute to Mali), Maria Kong at Barbi, Tel Aviv

== History ==
Maria Kong was founded in 2009 in Tel Aviv by Anderson Braz, Talia Landa, Leo Lerus and Yaara Moses, all former dancers of Batsheva Dance Company. Their debut performance, Fling, premiered in 2010 at Nachmani Theatre in Tel Aviv, incorporating dance with technological experiments.

== International tours ==
In 2011 and again in 2012, Maria Kong performed at the Dancing Poznan Festival in Poznan, Poland. In 2012 the group also performed at the Drupa Exhibition in Düsseldorf, Germany. The group premiered a new dance, Open Source, choreographed by Landa.

In 2013 they performed at the Open Stage Festival in Tarnow, Poland and the Beijing Dance Festival in Beijing, China.

In 2014 Maria Kong performed at the Delhi International Arts Festival in India; the Dance Ga Mitai 16 Festival in Tokyo, Japan; the International Festival for Alternative Theatre in Novisad, Serbia; the Danza Nueva - Festival International De Lima, in Lima, Peru; the SIBIU International Theatre Festival, in Sibiu, Romania; performances in Bialystok, Poland, and Busan, South Korea.

The company continued touring in 2015, visiting Vancouver, British Columbia. The dancers performed at the Vancouver International Dance Festival and the Chutzpah Festival. The group returned to tour in Canada in 2016 with the digital/dance show Open Source, including shows in Montreal and Vancouver.

In one of their shows, Open Source, they used digital gloves on stage, which were designed by group member Ori Ben-Shabat and further developed with the help of open source programming. It allowed the performers to create the beat and special sound effects as they moved.
