= Rossiya (musical ensemble) =

- Genres: Folklore, classical
- Years active: 1977
- Past members: Lyudmila Zakyna
- Website: russia-ensemble.ru

"Zykina State Academic Russian Folk Ensemble 'Rossiya'" (Russian: «Государственный академический русский народный ансамбль „Россия“ имени Л. Г. Зыкиной» is a Soviet and Russian musical ensemble founded by Lyudmila Zykina.

In 1968, while touring the United States with the Osipov Orchestra, Lyudmila Zykina met the renowned impresario Sol Hurok. Impressed by a concert, he advised Zykina to create her own compact ensemble, primarily of soloists but also with accompanying duties. The idea was further developed in Moscow, where the first lineup was formed with the participation of musician Roman Matskevich, who became the "ensemble's organizer". The future ensemble's debut tour took place in the United States. Having toured almost the entire country, the musicians gave over 40 concerts, including at the world-famous Carnegie Hall in New York. This trip became the young ensemble's first baptism of fire and sealed its fate. Lyudmila Zykina was now faced with the task of creating a permanent and mobile ensemble performing folk music.

In 1977, the Ministry of Culture of the RSFSR issued an order to organize the Russian folk ensemble "Rossiya" in Moscow. Zykina founded the State Republican Russian Folk Ensemble "Rossiya" whose artistic director she served until her death in 2009. Since 1994, the "Rossiya" ensemble has held the title of academic.

In 2009, the "Rossiya" ensemble was given the "Zheleznodorozhnik" Community Center, located at 24 Cherepanov Proezd.

On 25 May 2023 the ensemble was awarded the Gratitude of the Government of the Russian Federation.

== Leaders ==
- 1977-1993 - Viktor Gridin (chief conductor, People's Artist of the RSFSR))
- 1994-2004 - Nikolai Nikolaevich Stepanov (chief conductor, Honored Artist of the Russian Federation)
- 2004-2009 - Anatoly Sobolev (chief conductor, People's Artist of Russia)
- 2010 - present - Dmitry Sergeevich Dmitrienko (director, artistic director)
