= Gevolt =

Israeli folk metal band from Tel Aviv

- Origin: Tel Aviv, Israel
- Genre: Heavy metal
- Years active: 2001–present
- Website: www.gevolt.com

Gevolt are an Israeli heavy metal band, founded in 2001. The band is known as the pioneers of Yiddish metal. They were the first band to combine traditional Yiddish music with heavy metal.

== History ==
The band was formed in Israel in 2001 by Anatholy Bonder (vocals), Yevgeny Kushnir (guitars), Oleg Szumski (drums) and Max Mann (bass guitars). In 2005 Marina Klionski (violins) joined.

In 2006, Gevolt self-released their debut full-length album Sidur in the Russian language. After the release Oleg Szumski left the band and was replaced by Vadim Weinstein, and Dmitry Lifshitz (synths) joined the band.

Gevolt started recording of their second album in 2005, and released the 2-track promo single "Yiddish Metal" in 2007. In this single the band changed their concept and started singing in Yiddish, covering classic Yiddish songs.

In 2008 Sidur had a US/Canadian re-release by Renaissance Records/Koch Entertainment Distribution. At the same time Marina Klionski left the band and Gevolt had two violinists, Anna Agre and Eva Yefremov. Anna Agre left the band after a year.

In 2009, Yevgeny Kushnir left the band and was replaced by Michael Gimmervert.

In 2010, Max Mann left and was replaced by Mark Lekhovitser.

In February 2011, Gevolt released their second full-length album, AlefBase. AlefBase, the first metal album fully with Yiddish lyrics, was released to positive reception and received media coverage in Die Welt, Jerusalem Post, and The Forward.

In 2012, Mark Lekhovitser left Gevolt.

In 2013, Michael Gimmervert left the band and new guitar and bass players Vadim Raitses and Anton Skorohodov joined.

In 2013 the band performed at Folk-Fest Israel on one stage with Korpiklaani and Týr.

Gevolt released a Nu Klezmer Metal single "Khokhotshet" was released in March 2015.

Vadim Raitses and Anton Skorohodov left after releasing the single "Khokhotshet" in 2015.

In 2016, Gevolt had a mini tour in China where it performed in two major events, Taihu Midi Festival and Dream Sonic Festival. For this tour the band formed a new line up with the return of Michael Gimmervert and including Alex Zvulun (Bass), Marianne Tur (Violin), and Dror Goldstein (Drums).

== Discography ==
Release date	Title	Type
2006	Sidur	Full-length album
2007	Yiddish Metal	Single (promo)
2011	AlefBase	Full-length album
2015	Khokhotshet	Single

== Band members ==
- Anatholy Bonder – lead vocals (2001–present)
- Dmitry Lifshitz – synths (2006–present)
- Vadim Weinstein – drums (2006–present)
- Eva Yefremov – violin (2008–present)

Former members

- Vadim Raitses – guitars (2013–2015)
- Yevgeny Kushnir – guitars (2001–2009)
- Anton Skorohodov – bass (2013–2015)
- Mark Lekhovitser – bass (2010–2013)
- Michael Gimmervert – guitars (2009–2013)
- Anna Agre – violin (2008–2009)
- Marina Klionski – violin (2005–2008)
- Max Mann – bass (2001–2010)
- Oleg Szumski – drums (2001–2006)
