= Erev Shel Shoshanim =

Hebrew song

"Erev Shel Shoshanim" (English: Evening of Lilies or Evening of Roses; the Hebrew word shoshana has been identified with both flowers) is a poetic Hebrew love song. Its melody is often used as wedding music in Jewish weddings. It is well known within Israeli and Jewish music circles and throughout the Middle East.

The song is by Yosef Hadar, with lyrics by Moshe Dor. It was first recorded in 1957 by singer Yafa Yarkoni, and a year later by the duo HaDuda'im, whose version became a smash hit in Israel. They toured the world extensively in the '60s, and their version became one of their international signature songs.

In 1966, Israeli folk dancing choreographer Zvi Hillman created the first folk dance based on the song.

== Other versions of the song ==
During the '60s and '70s the song was recorded by various international singers, including Harry Belafonte, Olivera Katarina, Nana Mouskouri, Daliah Lavi, Victor Jara and Quilapayún, Martin Simpson and Miriam Makeba. In 1974, Yugoslav progressive rock band Dah recorded their hit song "Šošana", which featured a melody based on "Erev Shel Shoshanim". In 1975, after moving to Belgium and changing the name to Land, they recorded an English-language version of "Šošana" entitled "Shoshana", which became an international hit and made the song's melody a popular football chant.

The song was translated in the 1960s into Armenian by Bob Tashjian and John Berberian, in which it is called "Yarus" or "Yars" (O, Rose!). John Berberian later recorded his version of the song with the translated lyrics.

Juhani Forsberg used the melody, which he thought to be an Israeli folksong, in his song "Tiellä ken vaeltaa", which was later added to the hymnbook of Evangelical Lutheran Church of Finland.

The melody of the song is also used for the Polish Catholic song "Jeden jest tylko Pan (There is only one God)", with the lyrics being about the church being the house of God.

A version of the song was sampled in the 2016 hit song, "Save Me" by French pop artist The Parakit.

The song’s use of a minor key opening up into the subdominant chord inspired rock band The Lovin’ Spoonful’s lead singer John Sebastian to write the melody for ”Summer in the City.”

== Lyrics ==
=== English translation ===
Evening of roses
Let us go out to the grove
Myrrh, perfumes, and frankincense
Is the carpet under your feet

Night falls slowly
And a wind of rose blows
Let me whisper a song for you slowly
A song of love

Dawn and the dove coos
Your head is full of dewdrops
Your mouth is as a rose unto the morning
I will pick it for myself

=== English transliteration ===
Erev shel shoshanim
Netse na el habustan
Mor besamim ulevona
Leraghelech miftan

Layla yored le'at
Veru'ach shoshan noshvah
Hava elchash lach shir balat
Zemer shel ahava

Shachar homa yona
Roshech ma'le telalim
Pich el haboker shoshana
Ektefenu li

=== Original Hebrew ===
ערב של שושנים
נצא נא אל הבוסתן
מור בשמים ולבונה
.לרגלך מפתן

לילה יורד לאט
ורוח שושן נושבה
הבה אלחש לך שיר בלאט
.זמר של אהבה

שחר הומה יונה
ראשך מלא טללים
פיך אל הבוקר, שושנה
.אקטפנו לי
