= Eurovision Song Contest 2011 =

International song competition

- Feel Your Heart Beat!

Dates and venue
- Semi-final 1: 10 May 2011
- Semi-final 2: 12 May 2011
- Final: 14 May 2011
- Venue: Esprit Arena; Düsseldorf, Germany

Organisation
- Organiser: European Broadcasting Union (EBU)
- Executive supervisor: Jon Ola Sand

Production
- Host broadcaster: ARD (Note: Arbeitsgemeinschaft der öffentlich-rechtlichen Rundfunkanstalten der Bundesrepublik Deutschland) – Norddeutscher Rundfunk (NDR)
- Director: Ladislaus Kiraly
- Executive producers: Ralf Quibeldey; Thomas Schreiber
- Presenters: Anke Engelke; Judith Rakers; Stefan Raab

Participants
- Number of entries: 43
- Number of finalists: 25
- Returning countries: Austria; Hungary; Italy; San Marino
- Participation map: Finalist countries Countries eliminated in the semi-finals Countries that participated in the past but not in 2011

Vote
- Voting system: Each country awarded 12, 10, 8–1 points to their 10 favourite songs
- Winning song: Azerbaijan; "Running Scared"

The Eurovision Song Contest 2011 was the 56th edition of the Eurovision Song Contest. It consisted of two semi-finals on 10 and 12 May and a final on 14 May 2011, held at the Esprit Arena in Düsseldorf, Germany, and presented by Anke Engelke, Stefan Raab, and Judith Rakers. It was organised by the European Broadcasting Union (EBU) and host broadcaster Norddeutscher Rundfunk (NDR) on behalf of ARD, which staged the event after winning the 2010 contest for Germany with the song "Satellite" by Lena.

Broadcasters from forty-three countries participated in the contest, equalling the record for the 2008 edition. Four countries returned to the contest this year; Austria returned after their last participation in 2007, Hungary returned after their last participation in 2009, San Marino returned after their first participation in 2008. Italy also returned to the contest after their last participation fourteen years earlier, in 1997.

The winner was Azerbaijan with the song "Running Scared", performed by Ell and Nikki, and written by Stefan Örn, Sandra Bjurman, and Iain James Farquharson. This was Azerbaijan's first victory in the contest, after only four years of participation. It was also the first male-female duo to win the contest since 1963. Azerbaijan won the televote and combined vote, while Italy won the jury vote and came second overall. Sweden, Ukraine, and Denmark rounded out the top five. Apart from Italy, the only other "Big Five" country to make the top 10 was host nation Germany, finishing tenth. The United Kingdom followed closely behind, finishing eleventh. This was the first time since the juries were reintroduced alongside the televoting in 2009 that the winner did not place first in the jury voting; Italy was the jury winner, while Azerbaijan was the televote winner. Georgia, finishing ninth, equalled its best result from 2010. For the first time since the introduction of semi-finals in 2004, Turkey failed to qualify for the final. Additionally, Armenia failed to qualify for the final for the first time since its debut in 2006.

The broadcast of the final won the Rose d'Or award for Best Live Event.

== Location ==
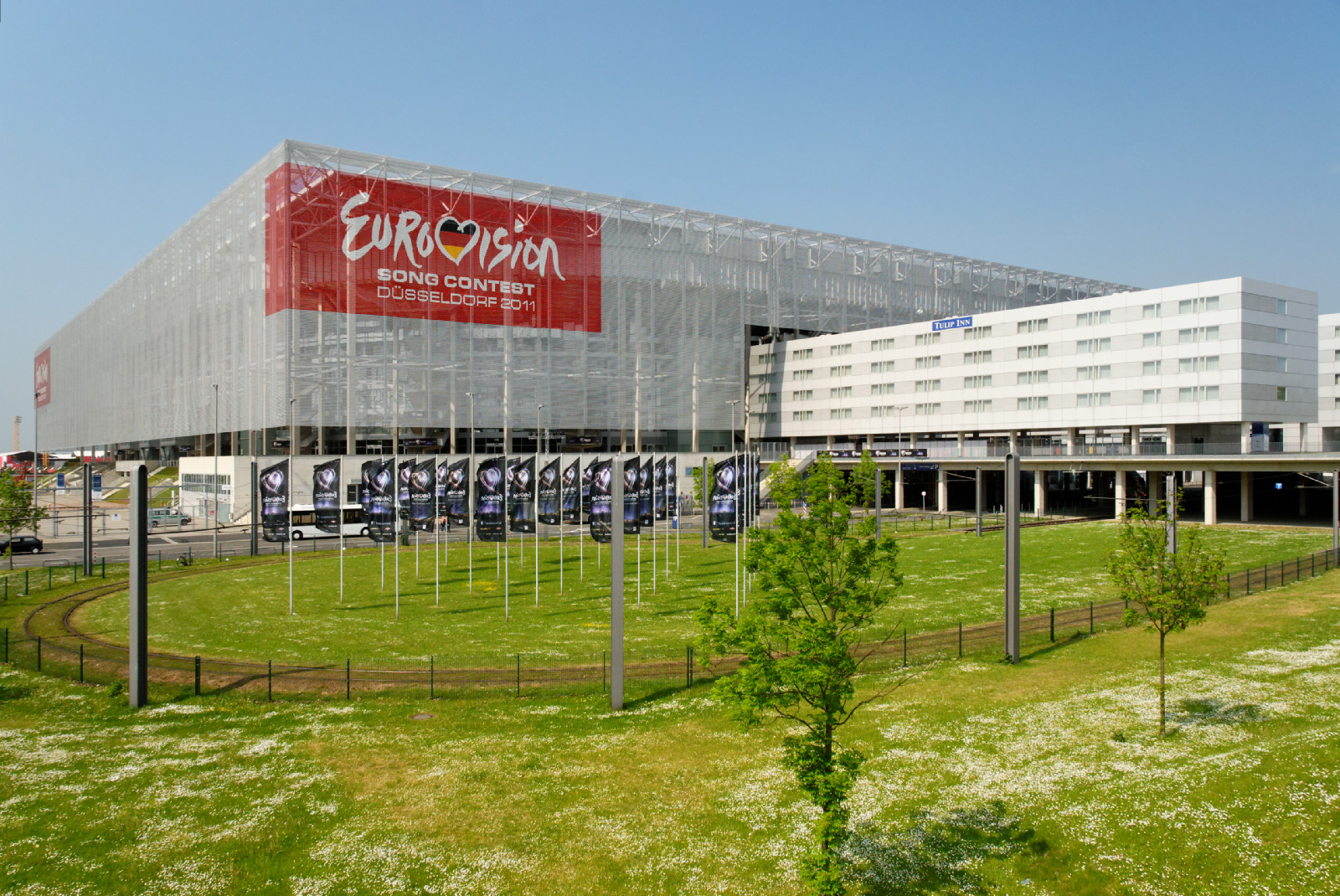
Esprit Arena – host venue of the 2011 contest.

The contest took place in Düsseldorf, the seventh-largest city in Germany. This was the first contest to take place outside the host nation's capital city since the 2004 contest in Istanbul. It was also the first Eurovision Song Contest held in Germany since German reunification, with West Germany having previously hosted the contest in 1957 and 1983. Germany was also the first country of the "Big Five" to host the contest since the implementation of the rule in 2000 that permits the five countries whose broadcasters are the largest contributors to the EBU – Germany, France, the United Kingdom, Spain, and Italy – to qualify automatically for the final alongside the previous year's winner.

The Esprit Arena, a multi-functional football stadium, hosted the contest. The stadium acquired a rental period of six weeks, in order to allow construction and dismantling work in relation to the contest to be carried out. The arena accommodated 35,000 spectators during the contest. Düsseldorf offered 23,000 hotel beds and 2,000 additional beds in the Düsseldorf surroundings and on ships on the River Rhine.

=== Bidding phase ===
Twenty-three cities submit official bids to Norddeutscher Rundfunk (NDR), in order to be the host city for the 2011 contest. Eight of these cities continued to show interest in hosting the event including Berlin, Hamburg, Hanover, Gelsenkirchen, Düsseldorf, Cologne, Frankfurt, and Munich. NDR announced on 21 August 2010 that four of those cities had officially applied to host the 2011 contest: Berlin, Hamburg, Hanover, and Düsseldorf. On 2 October 2010 the Hamburger Abendblatt newspaper announced that Hamburg would be unable to host the 2011 Song Contest, because the city could no longer fulfil the required financial conditions.

Locations of the candidate cities: the chosen host city is marked in blue. The cities that officially applied to host are marked in green, while the cities that showed interest but pulled out are marked in red.

Concerns were raised about Berlin's bid concept which consisted of an inflatable tent to be built on Tempelhof's hangar area. Decision makers at NDR reportedly doubted the venue's ability to provide advantageous acoustic conditions. Berlin's speaker Richard Meng neither confirmed nor denied that because, he stated, "secrecy about the bid concepts was promised to the NDR".

On 24 September 2010, it was announced that Fortuna Düsseldorf football club had applied to the Deutsche Fußball Liga for permission to move its home matches to the Paul-Janes-Stadion if the Düsseldorf Arena was awarded the Song Contest. This message indicated that talks with Düsseldorf to host the song contest in the Düsseldorf Arena were already at an advanced stage. The club later announced on 6 October 2010 that it had obtained permission to move its games if necessary. The Neue Ruhr Zeitung newspaper reported on 12 December 2010 that Fortuna Düsseldorf were to be moved to the Paul-Janes-Stadion due to the contest, however it was later decided Fortuna Düsseldorf's training venue next to the Düsseldorf Arena would be equipped with mobile stands from a Swiss event construction specialist, Nussli Group, creating 20,000 extra seats, the decision being made for logistical purposes. The stadium would be named the Lena-Arena and host the remaining 3 home games of Fortuna Düsseldorf's 2. Bundesliga campaign.

On 12 October 2010, NDR announced that the Düsseldorf Arena had been chosen as the host venue for the 2011 Eurovision Song Contest.

Key † Host venue

City	Venue	Notes	Ref.
Berlin	A large tent on the grounds of Tempelhof Airport	If chosen, the tent would have been located on the field near the hangars. Allegedly only room for 9,000 spectators.	
Düsseldorf	Esprit Arena †	Home of the Fortuna Düsseldorf football club. The stadium can hold up to 50,000 spectators, but would hold up to 38,000 spectators for the contest	
Hamburg	Hamburg Messehallen, Hall A1	Would be staged at Hall A1, but with room for less than 10,000 spectators.	
Hanover	Hanover Exhibition Centre	—	

== Participants ==
Eurovision Song Contest 2011 – Participation summaries by country
- Albania; Armenia; Austria; Azerbaijan; Belarus; Belgium; Bosnia and Herzegovina; Bulgaria; Croatia; Cyprus; Denmark; Estonia; Finland; France; Georgia; Germany; Greece; Hungary; Iceland; Ireland; Israel; Italy; Latvia; Lithuania; Macedonia; Malta; Moldova; Netherlands; Norway; Poland; Portugal; Romania; Russia; San Marino; Serbia; Slovakia; Slovenia; Spain; Sweden; Switzerland; Turkey; Ukraine; United Kingdom

On 31 December 2010, it was confirmed that 43 countries would compete in the 2011 contest. The 2011 edition saw the returns of Austria, which had last participated in 2007; Italy, which had last participated in 1997; San Marino, which had only taken part in 2008; and Hungary, which had last participated in 2009. Montenegro had applied to take part in the contest on 4 December, but decided against participation and withdrew on 23 December, two days before 25 December no-strings-attached deadline.

Slovenská televízia (STV) announced its withdrawal from the 2011 contest due to financial reasons, despite holding a public poll on its website on its Eurovision participation which received an 87.5% positive vote. STV announced that it planned to return in the 2012 contest. However, Slovakia's application remained on the provisional list, leading to its participation in the 2011 contest. STV announced in January 2011 that it would yet withdraw from the contest, citing to financial reasons and organisational changes. However it was listed by the EBU as one of the semi-finalist countries in the semi-final allocation draw on 17 January, and STV later confirmed it would continue its participation to avoid a fine for a late withdrawal.

At a meeting in Belgrade on 28 August 2010, the EBU decided that each country had to choose its artist and song before 14 March 2011. On 15 March 2011, the draw for the running order took place in the host city. The semi-final allocation draw took place on 17 January in Düsseldorf.

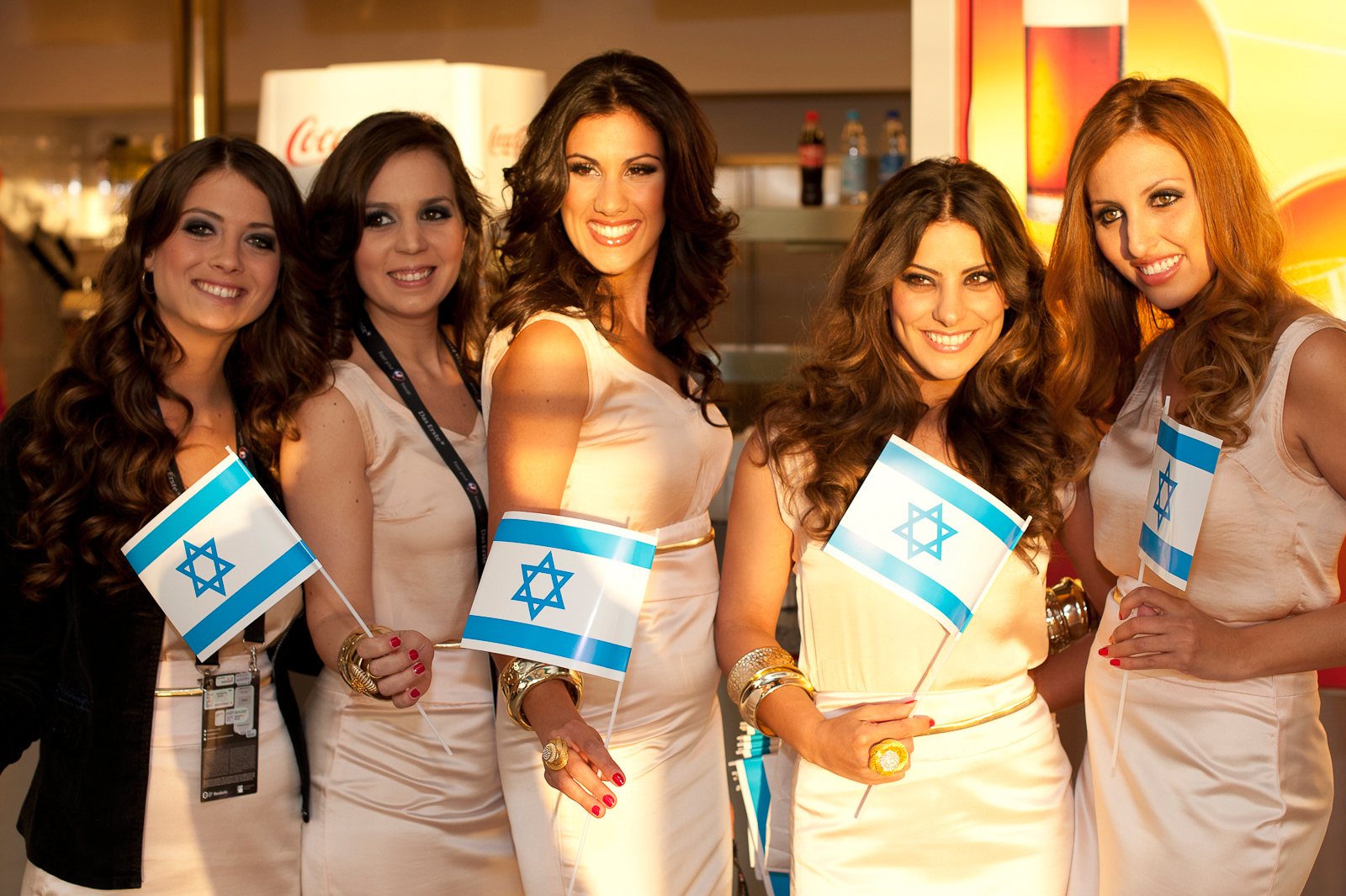
Israeli backing vocalists, at Eurovision 2011

Several of the performing artists had previously represented the same country in past editions, including Dino Merlin, who had represented Bosnia and Herzegovina in 1999. Gunnar Ólason, a member of Sjonni's Friends, had represented Iceland in 2001 as part of Two Tricky. Zdob și Zdub had represented Moldova in 2005. Sophio Toroshelidze, the lead singer of Eldrine, had provided backing vocals for Georgia in 2010. In addition, TWiiNS representing Slovakia, had provided backing vocals for the Czech Republic in 2008.

Along with those artists, two previous Eurovision winners also returned to the contest: Dana International who won the contest for Israel in 1998, and Lena who won for Germany in 2010 and brought the contest to Düsseldorf. Stefan Raab, who represented Germany in 2000 and appeared as a conductor and backing artist for other German entries, hosted the contest. This was the first time since 1958 and only the second time in the history of the contest that two former winners returned on the same year.

Eurovision Song Contest 2011 participants
Country	Broadcaster	Artist	Song	Language	Songwriter(s)
Albania	RTSH	Aurela Gaçe	"Feel the Passion"	English	Sokol Marsi; Shpëtim Saraçi
Armenia	AMPTV	Emmy	"Boom Boom"	English	Hayk Harutyunyan; Hayk Hovhannisyan; Sosi Khanikyan
Austria	ORF	Nadine Beiler	"The Secret is Love"	English	Nadine Beiler; Thomas Rabitsch
Azerbaijan	İTV	Ell and Nikki	"Running Scared"	English	Sandra Bjurman; Iain James Farquharson; Stefan Örn
Belarus	BTRC	Anastasia Vinnikova	"I Love Belarus"	English	Svetlana Geraskova; Eugene Oleynik
Belgium	RTBF	Witloof Bay	"With Love Baby"	English	Benoît Giaux; RoxorLoops
Bosnia and Herzegovina	BHRT	Dino Merlin	"Love in Rewind"	English	Dino Merlin
Bulgaria	BNT	Poli Genova	"Na inat" (На инат)	Bulgarian	Sebastian Arman; David Bronner; Poli Genova; Borislav Milanov
Croatia	HRT	Daria	"Celebrate"	English	Boris Đurđević; Marina Mudrinić
Cyprus	CyBC	Christos Mylordos	"San aggelos s'agapisa" (Σαν άγγελος σ'αγάπησα)	Greek	Andreas Anastasiou; Michalis Antoniou
Denmark	DR	A Friend in London	"New Tomorrow"	English	Lise Cabble; Jakob Schack Glæsner
Estonia	ERR	Getter Jaani	"Rockefeller Street"	English	Sven Lõhmus
Finland	Yle	Paradise Oskar	"Da Da Dam"	English	Axel Ehnström
France	France Télévisions	Amaury Vassili	"Sognu"	Corsican	Quentin Bachelet; Jean-Pierre Marcellesi; Julie Miller; Daniel Moyne
Georgia	GPB	Eldrine	"One More Day"	English	Mikheil Chelidze; DJ BE$$; DJ Rock
Germany	NDR (Note: On behalf of the German public broadcasting consortium ARD)	Lena	"Taken by a Stranger"	English	Monica Birkenes; Nicole Morier; Gus Seyffert
Greece	ERT	Loukas Yorkas feat. Stereo Mike	"Watch My Dance"	English, Greek	Giannis Christodoulopoulos; Eleana Vrachali
Hungary	MTVA	Kati Wolf	"What About My Dreams?"	English, Hungarian	Péter Geszti; Johnny K. Palmer; Gergő Rácz; Viktor Rakonczai
Iceland	RÚV	Sjonni's Friends	"Coming Home"	English	Sjonni Brink; Þórunn Clausen
Ireland	RTÉ	Jedward	"Lipstick"	English	Lars Halvor Jensen; Martin Michael Larsson; Daniel Priddy
Israel	IBA	Dana International	"Ding Dong"	Hebrew, English	Dana International
Italy	RAI	Raphael Gualazzi	"Madness of Love"	Italian, English	Raffaele Gualazzi
Latvia	LTV	Musiqq	"Angel in Disguise"	English	Marats Ogļezņevs
Lithuania	LRT	Evelina Sašenko	"C'est ma vie"	English, French, Lithuanian Sign Language	Andrius Kairys; Paulius Zdanavičius
Macedonia	MRT	Vlatko Ilievski	"Rusinka" (Русинкa)	Macedonian, English	Vladimir Dojčinovski; Jovan Jovanov; Grigor Koprov; Marko Marinković "Slatkaristika"
Malta	PBS	Glen Vella	"One Life"	English	Fleur Balzan; Paul Giordimaina
Moldova	TRM	Zdob și Zdub	"So Lucky"	English	Marc Elsner; Mihai Gîncu; Roman Iagupov; Andy Schuman
Netherlands	TROS	3JS	"Never Alone"	English	Jan Dulles; Jaap Kwakman; Jaap de Witte
Norway	NRK	Stella Mwangi	"Haba Haba"	English, Swahili	Beyond51; Big City; Stella Mwangi
Poland	TVP	Magdalena Tul	"Jestem"	Polish	Magdalena Tul
Portugal	RTP	Homens da Luta	"A luta é alegria"	Portuguese	Vasco Duarte; Jel
Romania	TVR	Hotel FM	"Change"	English	Gabriel Băruţa; Alexandra Ivan
Russia	C1R	Alexey Vorobyov	"Get You"	English, Russian	AJ Junior; Bilal "The Chef"; RedOne; Eric Sanicola; Alexey Vorobyov
San Marino	SMRTV	Senit	"Stand By"	English	Radiosa Romani
Serbia	RTS	Nina	"Čaroban" (Чаробан)	Serbian	Kristina Kovač
Slovakia	RTVS	Twiins	"I'm Still Alive"	English	Branislav Jančich; Sandra Nordstrom; Bryan Todd
Slovenia	RTVSLO	Maja Keuc	"No One"	English	Matjaž Vlašič; Urša Vlašič
Spain	RTVE	Lucía Pérez	"Que me quiten lo bailao"	Spanish	Rafael Artesero
Sweden	SVT	Eric Saade	"Popular"	English	Fredrik Kempe
Switzerland	SRG SSR	Anna Rossinelli	"In Love for a While"	English	David Klein
Turkey	TRT	Yüksek Sadakat	"Live It Up"	English	Ergün Arsal; Kutlu Özmakinacı
Ukraine	NTU	Mika Newton	"Angel"	English	Ruslan Kvinta; Maryna Skomorohova
United Kingdom	BBC	Blue	"I Can"	English	Ciaron Bell; Ben Collier; Ian Hope; Duncan James; Liam Keenan; Lee Ryan; StarSign

== Format ==
The four countries that were part of the "Big Four", along with the host of the contest, automatically qualify for a place in the grand final. Since Germany was both a "Big Four" country and the host for the 2011 contest, there was a vacant spot in the grand final. At a Reference Group meeting in Belgrade it was decided that the existing rules would remain in place, and that the number of participants in the grand final would simply be lowered from twenty-five to twenty-four. On 31 December 2010, the official participation list was published by the EBU, which stipulated that with the return of Italy to the contest, the nation would become a member of the newly expanded "Big Five". This change permitted Italy automatic qualification into the grand final, alongside France, Spain, the United Kingdom and host nation Germany, restoring the number of participants for the grand final to twenty-five nations.

On 30 August 2010, it was announced that Svante Stockselius, Executive Supervisor of the Eurovision Song Contest, would be leaving his position on 31 December 2010. On 26 November 2010, the EBU announced that Jon Ola Sand would succeed Stockselius as Executive Supervisor.

=== Semi-final allocation draw ===
Results of the semi-final allocation draw Participating countries in the first semi-final Pre-qualified for the final but also voting in the first semi-final Participating countries in the second semi-final Pre-qualified for the final but also voting in the second semi-final

The draw to determine the semi-final running orders was held on 17 January 2011. All of the participating countries excluding the automatic finalists were split into six pots, based on the voting history of those countries in previous years. From these pots, half (or as close to half as was possible) competed in the first semi-final on 10 May 2011. The other half in that particular pot competed in the second semi-final on 12 May 2011. This draw doubled as an approximate running order, in order for the delegations from the countries to know when their rehearsals commenced. The draw also determined in which of the semi-finals the automatic finalists would be able to cast their votes.

Israeli broadcaster IBA requested to compete in the second semi-final, rather than the first semi-final that was pulled in the draw, due to Israel's Memorial Day coinciding with the first semi-final. German broadcaster NDR also requested that it be allowed to vote in the second semi-final for scheduling reasons.

Pot 1	Pot 2	Pot 3	Pot 4	Pot 5	Pot 6
Albania; Bosnia and Herzegovina; Croatia; Macedonia; Serbia; Slovenia; Switzerland	Denmark; Estonia; Finland; Iceland; Norway; Sweden	Azerbaijan; Belarus; Georgia; Israel; Moldova; Russia; Ukraine	Armenia; Belgium; Cyprus; Greece; Netherlands; Turkey	Ireland; Latvia; Lithuania; Malta; Portugal; Romania	Austria; Bulgaria; Hungary; Poland; San Marino; Slovakia

=== Graphic design ===
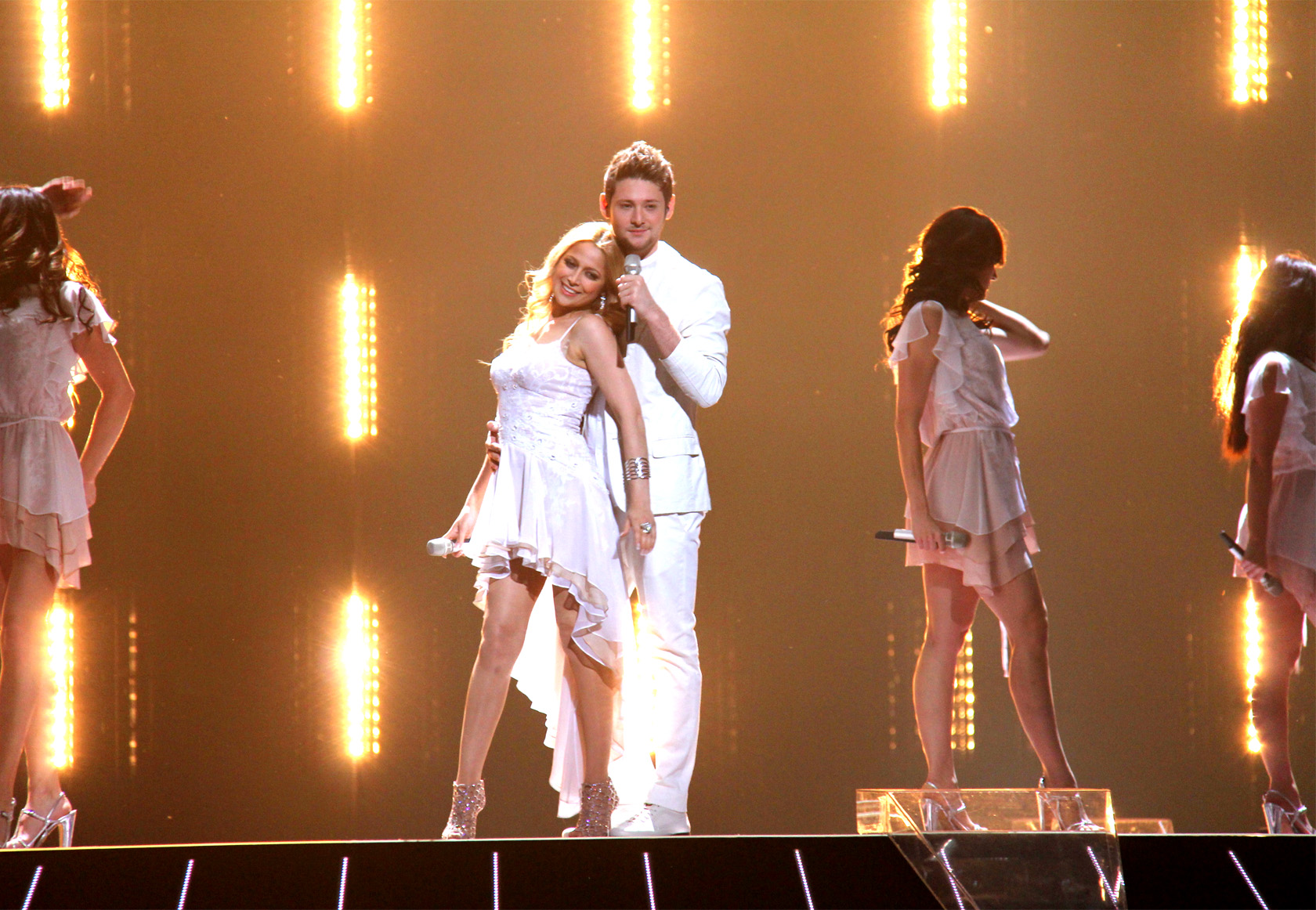
Ell and Nikki of Azerbaijan, during their performance

The design of the contest was built around the slogan "Feel Your Heart Beat", with the logo and on-screen graphics designed by Turquoise Branding. The postcard introducing each performance included the logo in the colours of the performing country (e.g. the United Kingdom in red, white and blue); then a German place was shown in a toy-like view using tilt-shift photography and a story happened there, whose main characters were people either living in Germany or tourists from that country. The contest's motto, 'Feel your heart beat', was then shown or said in the country's national or native language. For example, in the first postcard shown (Poland's), the boyfriend drops a piece of paper. The camera then pans down to the paper, to show the Polish phrase "Poczuj bicie serca" handwritten on it. In the second postcard shown (Norway's), a mountain climber from Norway climbs to the top of a mountain and yells the Norwegian phrase "Kjenn ditt hjerte slå.". Then, the heart appeared once again, and the stage and the crowd could be seen, with heartbeat sounds and pink lights pulsating in rhythm with the heartbeat, before the performance started.

The main colours of the letterboxes were black and pink. The scoreboard showed a spokesperson from the country giving their votes on the right, while showing a table of results on the left. The large points (8, 10 and 12) were highlighted in pink, whilst the lower points, (1–7) were in purple. This scoreboard design was used again the following year, with minor changes such as the large points appearing progressively larger in size compared to the lower points and the highlighted colours changed to match the 2012 theme, "Light your fire!"

=== Host broadcaster ===
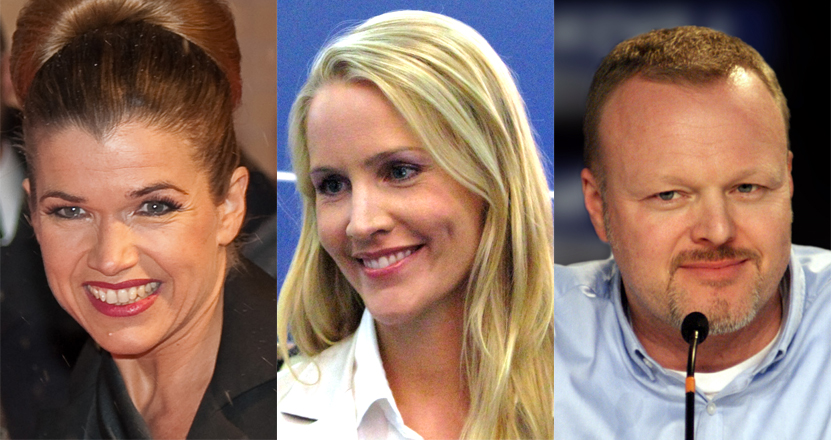
Hosts Anke Engelke, Judith Rakers, and Stefan Raab.

ARD, the German participating broadcaster in the Eurovision Song Contest, is a joint organisation of Germany's regional public-service broadcasters. The ARD has 10 members. The venues that were in consideration are located in the areas of three different members: Berlin is located within the Rundfunk Berlin-Brandenburg (RBB) member area, Hamburg and Hanover within the Norddeutscher Rundfunk (NDR) area and Düsseldorf within the Westdeutscher Rundfunk (WDR) broadcasting area. While ARD has delegated its participation in the contest to NDR in recent years, the financial scope of the three broadcasters seemed to have become a decisive factor in the application procedure for the 2011 contest. The Tagesspiegel reported on 7 October 2010 that the costs for hosting this event resulted in a tense discussion about necessary savings on other programme contents made by the three broadcasters.

=== Hosts ===
On 16 December 2010, NDR announced that Anke Engelke, Judith Rakers, and Stefan Raab were to be the presenters for the contest. It was the third time three people would host the contest, the previous such contests being 1999 and 2010. Raab had represented Germany in 2000 with "Wadde hadde dudde da?", whereas Engelke is an actress and comedian, and Rakers a journalist and television presenter.

=== Event concept and ticket sale ===
On 13 October 2010 Thomas Schreiber, coordinator at ARD, outlined details of Düsseldorf's event concept. The Düsseldorf Arena was to be split in two parts separated from each other. On one side of the stadium the stage would be installed while the other side would function as background dressing rooms for the artist delegations. An athletics arena next to the Düsseldorf Arena would serve as the press centre for the event. The Düsseldorf Arena offered comfortable seats relatively near to the stage that created an indoor event arena atmosphere rather than a football-stadium ambiance. There were plans to allow the public the chance to attend the dress rehearsals. Altogether, tickets were sold for seven shows (the grand final, two semi-finals and four dress rehearsals).

He also said in that interview that tickets for the event were likely to go on sale "within the next four weeks" (by mid-November 2010). NDR had already opened a preregistration e-mail-newsletter on its website for all people interested in tickets for the event.

Ticket sales started on 12 December 2010 at 12:12 CET on the website www.dticket.de, the only authorised seller. However, the ticket page opened for sales approximately two hours earlier than originally advertised; this announcement was made by an email newsletter sent to preregistered buyers minutes before opening, giving them a slight benefit in acquiring tickets. The grand final 32,000 tickets that were put on sale on 12 December sold out in less than six hours. Once camera positions had been determined, a few thousand extra tickets were put on sale.

Tickets for the semi-finals were put on sale in mid-January, when it was known which countries would take part in each semi-final.

== Contest overview ==
=== Semi-final 1 ===
The first semi-final took place on 10 May 2011 at 21:00 CEST. All the countries competing in this semi-final were eligible to vote, plus Spain and the United Kingdom. The ten countries in this semi-final with the highest scoring points, according to a combination of televotes and jury votes from each voting country, qualified for the grand final.

Multiple broadcasters lost contact with their commentators during this semi-final due to a technical glitch. Dropouts in the multi-channel sound connections were the cause of this fault, which was corrected with a backup system put in place and tested extensively before the second semi-final. Some commentators phoned their broadcaster to get their voice on television and radio broadcasts during the semi-final.

Qualifiers

Results of the first semi-final of the Eurovision Song Contest 2011
R/O	Country	Artist	Song	Points	Place
1	Poland	Magdalena Tul	"Jestem"	18	19
2	Norway	Stella Mwangi	"Haba Haba"	30	17
3	Albania	Aurela Gaçe	"Feel the Passion"	47	14
4	Armenia	Emmy	"Boom Boom"	54	12
5	Turkey	Yüksek Sadakat	"Live It Up"	47	13
6	Serbia	Nina	"Čaroban"	67	8
7	Russia	Alexey Vorobyov	"Get You"	64	9
8	Switzerland	Anna Rossinelli	"In Love for a While"	55	10
9	Georgia	Eldrine	"One More Day"	74	6
10	Finland	Paradise Oskar	"Da Da Dam"	103	3
11	Malta	Glen Vella	"One Life"	54	11
12	San Marino	Senit	"Stand By"	34	16
13	Croatia	Daria	"Celebrate"	41	15
14	Iceland	Sjonni's Friends	"Coming Home"	100	4
15	Hungary	Kati Wolf	"What About My Dreams?"	72	7
16	Portugal	Homens da Luta	"A luta é alegria"	22	18
17	Lithuania	Evelina Sašenko	"C'est ma vie"	81	5
18	Azerbaijan	Ell and Nikki	"Running Scared"	122	2
19	Greece	Loukas Yorkas feat. Stereo Mike	"Watch My Dance"	133	1

=== Semi-final 2 ===
The second semi-final took place on 12 May 2011 at 21:00 CEST. All the countries competing in this semi-final were eligible to vote, plus France, Germany and Italy. The ten countries in this semi-final with the highest scoring points, according to a combination of televotes and jury votes from each voting country, qualified for the grand final.

Qualifiers

Results of the second semi-final of the Eurovision Song Contest 2011
R/O	Country	Artist	Song	Points	Place
1	Bosnia and Herzegovina	Dino Merlin	"Love in Rewind"	109	5
2	Austria	Nadine Beiler	"The Secret Is Love"	69	7
3	Netherlands	3JS	"Never Alone"	13	19
4	Belgium	Witloof Bay	"With Love Baby"	53	11
5	Slovakia	Twiins	"I'm Still Alive"	48	13
6	Ukraine	Mika Newton	"Angel"	81	6
7	Moldova	Zdob și Zdub	"So Lucky"	54	10
8	Sweden	Eric Saade	"Popular"	155	1
9	Cyprus	Christos Mylordos	"San aggelos s'agapisa"	16	18
10	Bulgaria	Poli Genova	"Na inat"	48	12
11	Macedonia	Vlatko Ilievski	"Rusinka"	36	16
12	Israel	Dana International	"Ding Dong"	38	15
13	Slovenia	Maja Keuc	"No One"	112	3
14	Romania	Hotel FM	"Change"	111	4
15	Estonia	Getter Jaani	"Rockefeller Street"	60	9
16	Belarus	Anastasia Vinnikova	"I Love Belarus"	45	14
17	Latvia	Musiqq	"Angel in Disguise"	25	17
18	Denmark	A Friend in London	"New Tomorrow"	135	2
19	Ireland	Jedward	"Lipstick"	68	8

=== Final ===
The final took place on 14 May 2011 at 21:00 CEST and was won by Azerbaijan. Only the "Big Five" countries automatically qualified for the grand final. From the two semi-finals on 10 and 12 May 2011, twenty countries qualified for the grand final. A total of 25 countries competed in the final and all 43 participants voted. The voting system used was the same as in the 2010 contest, with a combination of televotes and jury votes selecting the winner. Viewers were able to vote during the performances; the voting window ended 15 minutes after the conclusion of the songs.

Background music for the show included "Wonderful" by Gary Go.

Azerbaijan won with 221 points, also winning the televote. Italy (who won the jury vote) came second with 189 points, with Sweden, Ukraine, Denmark, Bosnia and Herzegovina, Greece, Ireland, Georgia and Germany completing the top ten. Finland, Hungary, Spain, Estonia and Switzerland occupied the bottom five positions.

Winner

Results of the final of the Eurovision Song Contest 2011
R/O	Country	Artist	Song	Points	Place
1	Finland	Paradise Oskar	"Da Da Dam"	57	21
2	Bosnia and Herzegovina	Dino Merlin	"Love in Rewind"	125	6
3	Denmark	A Friend in London	"New Tomorrow"	134	5
4	Lithuania	Evelina Sašenko	"C'est ma vie"	63	19
5	Hungary	Kati Wolf	"What About My Dreams?"	53	22
6	Ireland	Jedward	"Lipstick"	119	8
7	Sweden	Eric Saade	"Popular"	185	3
8	Estonia	Getter Jaani	"Rockefeller Street"	44	24
9	Greece	Loukas Yorkas feat. Stereo Mike	"Watch My Dance"	120	7
10	Russia	Alexey Vorobyov	"Get You"	77	16
11	France	Amaury Vassili	"Sognu"	82	15
12	Italy	Raphael Gualazzi	"Madness of Love"	189	2
13	Switzerland	Anna Rossinelli	"In Love for a While"	19	25
14	United Kingdom	Blue	"I Can"	100	11
15	Moldova	Zdob și Zdub	"So Lucky"	97	12
16	Germany	Lena	"Taken by a Stranger"	107	10
17	Romania	Hotel FM	"Change"	77	17
18	Austria	Nadine Beiler	"The Secret Is Love"	64	18
19	Azerbaijan	Ell and Nikki	"Running Scared"	221	1
20	Slovenia	Maja Keuc	"No One"	96	13
21	Iceland	Sjonni's Friends	"Coming Home"	61	20
22	Spain	Lucía Pérez	"Que me quiten lo bailao"	50	23
23	Ukraine	Mika Newton	"Angel"	159	4
24	Serbia	Nina	"Čaroban"	85	14
25	Georgia	Eldrine	"One More Day"	110	9

==== Spokespersons ====
Each participating broadcaster appointed a spokesperson who was responsible for announcing, in English or French, the votes for its respective country. Unlike previous years, the voting order was not drawn with the order of presentation of songs. Rather, the voting order was calculated just before the event, to reduce the likelihood of there being an outright winner from the start. Countries revealed their votes in the following order:

1. Russia – Dima Bilan
2. Bulgaria – Maria Ilieva
3. Netherlands – Mandy Huydts
4. Italy – Raffaella Carrà
5. Cyprus – Loukas Hamatsos
6. Ukraine – Ruslana
7. Finland – Susan Aho
8. Norway – Nadia Hasnaoui
9. Armenia – Lusine Tovmasyan
10. Macedonia – Kristina Taleska
11. Iceland – Ragnhildur Steinunn Jónsdóttir
12. Slovakia – Mária Pietrová
13. United Kingdom – Alex Jones
14. Denmark – Lise Rønne
15. Austria – Kati Bellowitsch
16. Poland – Odeta Moro-Figurska
17. Sweden – Danny Saucedo
18. San Marino – Nicola Della Valle
19. Germany – Ina Müller
20. Azerbaijan – Safura Alizadeh
21. Slovenia – Klemen Slakonja
22. Turkey – Ömer Önder
23. Switzerland – Cécile Bähler
24. Greece – Lena Aroni
25. Georgia – Sofia Nizharadze
26. France – Cyril Féraud
27. Serbia – Dušica Spasić
28. Croatia – Nevena Rendeli
29. Belarus – Leila Ismailava
30. Romania – Malvina Cservenschi
31. Albania – Leon Menkshi
32. Malta – Kelly Schembri
33. Portugal – Joana Teles
34. Hungary – Éva Novodomszky
35. Lithuania – Giedrius Masalskis
36. Bosnia and Herzegovina – Ivana Vidmar
37. Ireland – Derek Mooney
38. Spain – Elena S. Sánchez
39. Israel – Ofer Nachshon
40. Estonia – Piret Järvis
41. Moldova – Geta Burlacu
42. Belgium – Maureen Louys
43. Latvia – Aisha

== Detailed voting results ==
The split jury/televoting results were announced by the EBU after the final. As in 2010, only the split totals received by each country were given, not the full breakdown.

=== Semi-final 1 ===
Qualifiers

Split results of semi-final 1
Place	Combined		Jury		Televoting	
Place	Country	Points	Country	Points	Country	Points
1	Greece	133	Lithuania	113	Greece	154
2	Azerbaijan	122	Azerbaijan	109	Azerbaijan	124
3	Finland	103	Iceland	104	Finland	111
4	Iceland	100	Serbia	102	Russia	93
5	Lithuania	81	Finland	86	Georgia	90
6	Georgia	74	Malta	84	Iceland	79
7	Hungary	72	Switzerland	76	Armenia	75
8	Serbia	67	San Marino	74	Hungary	73
9	Russia	64	Greece	74	Norway	56
10	Switzerland	55	Hungary	65	Turkey	54
11	Malta	54 (Note: Despite finishing with the same number of points as Armenia, Malta is deemed to have finished in eleventh place due to receiving points from a greater number of countries.)	Albania	61	Lithuania	52
12	Armenia	54	Turkey	58	Switzerland	45
13	Turkey	47 (Note: Despite finishing with the same number of points as Albania, Turkey is deemed to have finished in thirteenth place due to receiving points from a greater number of countries.)	Georgia	51	Albania	42
14	Albania	47	Croatia	49	Serbia	42
15	Croatia	41	Armenia	33	Portugal	39
16	San Marino	34	Russia	31	Croatia	32
17	Norway	30	Norway	29	Poland	25
18	Portugal	22	Poland	13	Malta	24
19	Poland	18	Portugal	6	San Marino	8

Detailed voting results of semi-final 1
		Total score	Poland	Norway	Albania	Armenia	Turkey	Serbia	Russia	Switzerland	Georgia	Finland	Malta	San Marino	Croatia	Iceland	Hungary	Portugal	Lithuania	Azerbaijan	Greece	Spain	United Kingdom
Contestants	Poland	18		3							4						4		2				5
Contestants	Norway	30	1		1	1				2		8	4			10		2		1			
Contestants	Albania	47					8			6				8	7			4		2	12		
Contestants	Armenia	54	2				7		8		8		7	7		4					8	3	
Contestants	Turkey	47			12				2	5	3		2	10						12			1
Contestants	Serbia	67	6	7	2				4	12		7	3	3	12	5		1	3			2	
Contestants	Russia	64		4	3	12	3	6			5	3		1	5	3	3	3	5	5	3		
Contestants	Switzerland	55	3	6		3		2				6			2	6	8	5	6			6	2
Contestants	Georgia	74	5			8	10	4	5			1	8	2			1		12	8	10		
Contestants	Finland	103	10	12		6	1	3	12	10					3	12	6	8	7	3		4	6
Contestants	Malta	54		2	6	7	2	5			6			12	4		2		1	7			
Contestants	San Marino	34			8	5	5				1		6		1					6	2		
Contestants	Croatia	41			7			12	1				12	4		1				4			
Contestants	Iceland	100	4	10		2		8	3	8		10					12	10	8		6	12	7
Contestants	Hungary	72		5			6	10				12	1		6	7					5	10	10
Contestants	Portugal	22			4					4	2										1	8	3
Contestants	Lithuania	81	12	8		4		1	7	3	10	2				2	5	6			4	5	12
Contestants	Azerbaijan	122	8		5		12		10	1	12	5	10	5	10	8	7	7	10		7	1	4
Contestants	Greece	133	7	1	10	10	4	7	6	7	7	4	5	6	8		10	12	4	10		7	8

==== 12 points ====
Below is a summary of the maximum 12 points each country awarded to another in the first semi-final:

N.	Contestant	Nation(s) giving 12 points
3	Finland	Iceland, Norway, Russia
2	Azerbaijan	Georgia, Turkey
2	Croatia	Malta, Serbia
2	Iceland	Hungary, Spain
2	Lithuania	Poland, United Kingdom
2	Serbia	Croatia, Switzerland
2	Turkey	Albania, Azerbaijan
1	Albania	Greece
1	Georgia	Lithuania
1	Greece	Portugal
1	Hungary	Finland
1	Malta	San Marino
1	Russia	Armenia

=== Semi-final 2 ===
Qualifiers

Split results of semi-final 2
Place	Combined		Jury		Televoting	
Place	Country	Points	Country	Points	Country	Points
1	Sweden	155	Slovenia	146	Sweden	159
2	Denmark	135	Denmark	129	Bosnia and Herzegovina	131
3	Slovenia	112	Sweden	99	Romania	121
4	Romania	111	Austria	95	Denmark	115
5	Bosnia and Herzegovina	109	Romania	85	Ukraine	91
6	Ukraine	81	Estonia	83	Ireland	78
7	Austria	69	Ukraine	76	Slovenia	68
8	Ireland	68	Belgium	71	Moldova	61
9	Estonia	60	Slovakia	71	Belarus	54
10	Moldova	54	Ireland	66	Austria	52
11	Belgium	53	Bosnia and Herzegovina	65	Israel	51
12	Bulgaria	48 (Note: Despite finishing with the same number of points as Slovakia, Bulgaria is deemed to have finished in thirteenth place due to receiving points from a greater number of countries.)	Bulgaria	59	Belgium	50
13	Slovakia	48	Moldova	53	Estonia	46
14	Belarus	45	Macedonia	47	Bulgaria	43
15	Israel	38	Belarus	38	Latvia	43
16	Macedonia	36	Israel	36	Slovakia	40
17	Latvia	25	Cyprus	24	Macedonia	33
18	Cyprus	16	Netherlands	22	Cyprus	23
19	Netherlands	13	Latvia	11	Netherlands	17

Detailed voting results of semi-final 2
		Total score	Bosnia and Herzegovina	Austria	Netherlands	Belgium	Slovakia	Ukraine	Moldova	Sweden	Cyprus	Bulgaria	Macedonia	Israel	Slovenia	Romania	Estonia	Belarus	Latvia	Denmark	Ireland	France	Germany	Italy
Contestants	Bosnia and Herzegovina	109		12	10	4	12	4		8			12		12			5	2	7		10	7	4
Contestants	Austria	69	7		3		5	1		4	4	10		1	7		2			5	2	1	12	5
Contestants	Netherlands	13				8						5												
Contestants	Belgium	53	8	1	6				6		2	6		2	2	8	1		3			6		2
Contestants	Slovakia	48	6	3		3		12	7				3		3	3		3			5			
Contestants	Ukraine	81	4				10		8	3	5	3	6	8	6	2	7	12		1				6
Contestants	Moldova	54					4					2	5	4		12		10	1		4		5	7
Contestants	Sweden	155	5	10	12	12	7	5	3		12		2	12	5	7	12	8	7	12	8	12	1	3
Contestants	Cyprus	16						6															2	8
Contestants	Bulgaria	48		2	2	1			5	1	10		1		4					4	1	3	4	10
Contestants	Macedonia	36	10					7	1					3	8			7						
Contestants	Israel	38			5	2				5	1		7			4		6				7		1
Contestants	Slovenia	112	12	8	8		8		4		7	8	10	6		10	5		4	8	6	5	3	
Contestants	Romania	111		6	4	10	6		12	7	8	1	4	7			6		5	6	3	8	6	12
Contestants	Estonia	60		5		6		8		6		4		5				1	8	3	10	4		
Contestants	Belarus	45	2				1	10	10		3		8			1	4		6					
Contestants	Latvia	25		4						2							8	2		2	7			
Contestants	Denmark	135	1	7	7	7	3	3	2	12	6	12		10	10	5	10	4	12		12	2	10	
Contestants	Ireland	68	3		1	5	2	2		10		7			1	6	3		10	10			8	

==== 12 points ====
Below is a summary of the maximum 12 points each country awarded to another in the second semi-final:

N.	Contestant	Nation(s) giving 12 points
7	Sweden	Belgium, Cyprus, Denmark, Estonia, France, Israel, Netherlands
4	Bosnia and Herzegovina	Austria, Macedonia, Slovakia, Slovenia
4	Denmark	Bulgaria, Ireland, Latvia, Sweden
2	Romania	Italy, Moldova
1	Austria	Germany
1	Moldova	Romania
1	Slovakia	Ukraine
1	Slovenia	Bosnia and Herzegovina
1	Ukraine	Belarus

=== Final ===
Winner

Split results of the final
Place	Combined		Jury		Televoting	
Place	Country	Points	Country	Points	Country	Points
1	Azerbaijan	221	Italy	251	Azerbaijan	223
2	Italy	189	Azerbaijan	182	Sweden	221
3	Sweden	185	Denmark	168	Greece	176
4	Ukraine	159	Slovenia	160	Ukraine	168
5	Denmark	134	Austria	145	United Kingdom	166
6	Bosnia and Herzegovina	125	Ireland	119	Bosnia and Herzegovina	151
7	Greece	120	Ukraine	117	Russia	138
8	Ireland	119	Serbia	111	Georgia	138
9	Georgia	110	Sweden	106	Germany	113
10	Germany	107	Germany	104	Ireland	101
11	United Kingdom	100	Bosnia and Herzegovina	90	Italy	99
12	Moldova	97	France	90	Moldova	98
13	Slovenia	96	Romania	86	Serbia	89
14	Serbia	85	Greece	84	Romania	79
15	France	82	Moldova	82	France	76
16	Russia	77 (Note: Despite finishing with the same number of points as Romania, Russia is deemed to have finished in sixteenth place due to receiving points from a greater number of countries.)	Georgia	79	Spain	73
17	Romania	77	Finland	75	Hungary	64
18	Austria	64	Estonia	74	Denmark	61
19	Lithuania	63	Iceland	72	Iceland	60
20	Iceland	61	Lithuania	66	Lithuania	55
21	Finland	57	Hungary	60	Finland	47
22	Hungary	53	United Kingdom	57	Slovenia	39
23	Spain	50	Switzerland	53	Estonia	32
24	Estonia	44	Spain	38	Austria	25
25	Switzerland	19	Russia	25	Switzerland	2

Detailed voting results of the final
		Total score	Russia	Bulgaria	Netherlands	Italy	Cyprus	Ukraine	Finland	Norway	Armenia	Macedonia	Iceland	Slovakia	United Kingdom	Denmark	Austria	Poland	Sweden	San Marino	Germany	Azerbaijan	Slovenia	Turkey	Switzerland	Greece	Georgia	France	Serbia	Croatia	Belarus	Romania	Albania	Malta	Portugal	Hungary	Lithuania	Bosnia and Herzegovina	Ireland	Spain	Israel	Estonia	Moldova	Belgium	Latvia
Contestants	Finland	57								12			10			5		5	7		2				5												1		3			7			
Contestants	Bosnia and Herzegovina	125		2	8	4				4		12					12		8		7		12	10	12	3		5	12	7			7												
Contestants	Denmark	134		7	12		3			7			12	6	5			3	10	4	6		8					7			1			5					12		10	10			6
Contestants	Lithuania	63	2							3					6			12									12		7	2		1							10	1					7
Contestants	Hungary	53						4	12				5				2		5			2						2	8			7								6					
Contestants	Ireland	119		3	5				10				4	8	12	12	4	1	12		8													8	6			2		7				7	10
Contestants	Sweden	185	1		10		10	1	6	10	4	6	7	10	3	10				6		3	4	4		6	1	10	1	4	4	3		6		10		5	4	5	12	12	3	4	
Contestants	Estonia	44						2	7	2						2																					7		7		5		6	2	4
Contestants	Greece	120	8	10		2	12	6			7	3								8	10	8			2		6		3			8	10			8							1	8	
Contestants	Russia	77		4			2	8			8		1								5	4				1	4		4		5		4			3	6				8	5	5		
Contestants	France	82	3			1	7	5	4		5									3						12	2			6			2	1	2			4		10			2	12	1
Contestants	Italy	189					1		3		6	1	3		7		6	10		12	3	1	3		4	10	7	8	2		3	6	12	10	10	4	10	6	5	12		6		6	12
Contestants	Switzerland	19												4	10														5																
Contestants	United Kingdom	100	4	12		10	4	3		1	2	5	2			3				2		5	1	6		2		1			2		6	7	3		3		6		1		4		5
Contestants	Moldova	97	7			8		7						5	8		5				4	7					5	4			7	12			5		4		8					1	
Contestants	Germany	107			7	6				5			6			8	10	4	6				7	3	8	4		3		1	8						2	3		3				5	8
Contestants	Romania	77		6	4	12										4	1					6		5												1			1	8	6	1	12	10	
Contestants	Austria	64		5	1				1		3	2		3	2	1			4		12		5	1	7		3			3				2		2		7							
Contestants	Azerbaijan	221	12		6		8	10	5				8	7			8	8	3	10				12	1	5	8	6		10	6	10	8	12	8	7	8	8			4	8	10	3	2
Contestants	Slovenia	96	5		2		6					10		1		7	3			1	1			2					10	12		4		3	1	6		12	2		3	2			3
Contestants	Iceland	61				5			8	8					4	6			1						10										4	12		1		2					
Contestants	Spain	50										4		2	1								2		3			12				5	5		12							4			
Contestants	Ukraine	159	10	8		7	5				12	7		12				2	2			12	6	7		7	10		6	5	10	2	3	4	7						7		8		
Contestants	Serbia	85			3	3			2	6	1	8					7	6		5			10		6					8			1				5	10		4					
Contestants	Georgia	110	6	1				12			10							7		7		10		8		8					12					5	12				2	3	7		

==== 12 points ====
Below is a summary of the maximum 12 points each country awarded to another in the grand final:

A record number of 20 countries received at least one set of 12 points during the grand final. The only countries not to receive full marks were Estonia, Russia, Switzerland, Germany and Serbia.

N.	Contestant	Nation(s) giving 12 points
5	Bosnia and Herzegovina	Austria, Macedonia, Serbia, Slovenia, Switzerland
4	Italy	Albania, Latvia, San Marino, Spain
3	Azerbaijan	Malta, Russia, Turkey
3	Denmark	Iceland, Ireland, Netherlands
3	Georgia	Belarus, Lithuania, Ukraine
3	Ireland	Denmark, Sweden, United Kingdom
3	Ukraine	Armenia, Azerbaijan, Slovakia
2	France	Belgium, Greece
2	Lithuania	Georgia, Poland
2	Romania	Italy, Moldova
2	Slovenia	Bosnia and Herzegovina, Croatia
2	Spain	France, Portugal
2	Sweden	Estonia, Israel
1	Austria	Germany
1	Finland	Norway
1	Greece	Cyprus
1	Hungary	Finland
1	Iceland	Hungary
1	Moldova	Romania
1	United Kingdom	Bulgaria

== Broadcasts ==
Most countries sent commentators to Düsseldorf or commentated from their own country, in order to add insight to the participants and, if necessary, the provision of voting information.

Broadcasters and commentators in participating countries
Country	Broadcaster	Channel(s)	Show(s)	Commentator(s)	Ref(s)
Albania	RTSH	TVSH	All shows	Leon Menkshi	
Armenia	AMPTV	Armenia 1	All shows	Artak Vardanyan	
Austria	ORF	ORF eins	All shows	Andi Knoll	
Austria	ORF	Hitradio Ö3	All shows	Martin Blumenau	
Austria	ORF	Hitradio Ö3	Final	Benny Hörtnagl	
Azerbaijan	İTV		All shows	Leyla Aliyeva	
Belarus	BTRC	Belarus-1	All shows	Denis Kurian	
Belgium	RTBF	La Une	All shows	Jean-Pierre Hautier and Jean-Louis Lahaye	
Belgium	VRT	Eén	All shows	Sven Pichal and André Vermeulen	
Belgium	VRT	Radio 2	All shows	Sven Pichal and André Vermeulen	
Bosnia and Herzegovina	BHRT	BHT 1	All shows	Dejan Kukrić	
Cyprus	CyBC	RIK 1	All shows	Melina Karageorgiou	
Denmark	DR	DR1, DR HD	All shows	Ole Tøpholm	
Estonia	ERR	ETV	All shows	Marko Reikop	
Estonia	ERR	Raadio 2	All shows	Marko Reikop	
Finland	YLE	YLE TV2, YLE HD	All shows	Finnish: Tarja Närhi and Asko Murtomäki; Swedish: Eva Frantz and Johan Lindroos	
Finland	YLE	YLE Radio Suomi	All shows	Sanna Kojo and Jorma Hietamäki	
Finland	YLE	YLE Radio Vega	All shows	Eva Frantz and Johan Lindroos	
France	France Télévisions	France Ô	SF2	Audrey Chauveau and Bruno Berberes	
France	France Télévisions	France 3	Final	Laurent Boyer and Catherine Lara	
France	Radio France	France Bleu	Final	Fabien Lecœuvre and Serge Poezevara	
Germany	ARD	Einsfestival	SF1	Peter Urban and Steven Gätjen	
Germany	ARD	Das Erste	SF2/Final	Peter Urban	
Germany	ARD	NDR 2, WDR 1LIVE, hr3	Final	Thomas Mohr, Steffi Neu and Tim Frühling	
Germany	ProSieben	ProSieben	SF1	Peter Urban and Steven Gätjen	
Greece	ERT	NET, ERT HD	All shows	Maria Kozakou	
Greece	ERT	Deftero Programma	All shows	Maria Kozakou	
Hungary	MTVA	m1	All shows	Gábor Gundel Takács	
Iceland	RÚV	Sjónvarpið	All shows	Hrafnhildur Halldorsdóttir	
Ireland	RTÉ	RTÉ Two	Semi-finals	Marty Whelan	
Ireland	RTÉ	RTÉ One	Final	Marty Whelan	
Ireland	RTÉ	RTÉ Radio 1	SF2/Final	Shay Byrne and Zbyszek Zalinski	
Italy	RAI	Rai 5, Rai Radio 2	SF2	Raffaella Carrà and Bob Sinclar	
Italy	RAI	Rai 2	Final	Raffaella Carrà and Bob Sinclar	
Latvia	LTV		All shows	Valters Frīdenbergs and Uģis Joksts	
Lithuania	LRT		All shows	Darius Užkuraitis	
Macedonia	MRT	MTV 1	All shows	Eli Tanaskovska	
Malta	PBS	TVM	All shows	Eileen Montesin	
Netherlands	TROS	Nederland 1	All shows	Jan Smit and Daniël Dekker	
Norway	NRK	NRK1	All shows	Olav Viksmo-Slettan	
Poland	TVP	TVP1	All shows	Artur Orzech	
Portugal	RTP	RTP1, RTP HD, RTP Internacional	All shows	Sílvia Alberto	
Romania	TVR	TVR 1, TVR HD, TVR Internaţional	All shows	Liana Stanciu and Bogdan Pavlică	
Russia	Channel One		All shows	Yana Churikova and Yuriy Aksyuta	
Russia	Channel One		Final	Kirill Nabutov	
Serbia	RTS	RTS1, RTS Sat	SF1	Marina Nikolić	
Serbia	RTS	RTS1, RTS Sat	SF2	Dragan Ilić	
Serbia	RTS	RTS1, RTS Sat	Final	Duška Vučinić-Lučić	
Serbia	RTS	Radio Belgrade	All shows	Tanja Zeljković	
Slovakia	RTVS	Jednotka, Rádio FM	All shows	Roman Bomboš	
Slovenia	RTVSLO	TV SLO 2	Semi-finals	Andrej Hofer	
Slovenia	RTVSLO	TV SLO 1	Final	Andrej Hofer	
Spain	RTVE	La 2	Semi-finals	José María Íñigo	
Spain	RTVE	La 1, TVE HD, TVE Internacional	Final	José María Íñigo	
Sweden	SVT	SVT1	All shows	Hélène Benno and Edward af Sillén	
Switzerland	SRG SSR	SF zwei	SF1/Final	Sven Epiney	
Switzerland	SRG SSR	TSR 2	SF1	Jean-Marc Richard and Henri Dès	
Switzerland	SRG SSR	TSR 2	Final	Jean-Marc Richard and Nicolas Tanner	
Turkey	TRT	TRT 1	All shows	Bülend Özveren and Erhan Konuk	
Ukraine	NTU	Pershyi Natsionalnyi	All shows	Timur Miroshnychenko and Tetyana Terekhova	
Ukraine	UR		All shows	Olena Zelinchenko	
United Kingdom	BBC	BBC Three, BBC HD	Semi-finals	Scott Mills and Sara Cox	
United Kingdom	BBC	BBC One, BBC One HD	Final	Graham Norton	
United Kingdom	BBC	BBC Radio 2	Final	Ken Bruce	

Broadcasters and commentators in non-participating countries
Country	Broadcaster	Channel(s)	Show(s)	Commentator(s)	Ref(s)
Australia	SBS	SBS One, SBS HD	All shows (Note: Broadcast on 13 May, 14 May and 15 May 2011)	Julia Zemiro and Sam Pang	
Faroe Islands	KvF		All shows (Note: Broadcast on timeshift with Danish commentary from DR)	Ole Tøpholm	
Greenland	KNR	KNR	Final (Note: Broadcast on timeshift)	No commentator	
New Zealand	Triangle Television	Triangle Stratos	All shows (Note: Broadcast on 11 May, 13 May and 15 May 2011)	No commentator	

== Other awards ==
In addition to the main winner's trophy, the Marcel Bezençon Awards and the Barbara Dex Award were contested during the 2011 Eurovision Song Contest. The OGAE, "General Organisation of Eurovision Fans" voting poll also took place before the contest.

=== Marcel Bezençon Awards ===
The Marcel Bezençon Awards, organised since 2002 by Sweden's then-Head of Delegation and 1992 representative Christer Björkman, and 1984 winner Richard Herrey, honours songs in the contest's final. The awards are divided into three categories: Artistic Award, Composers Award, and Press Award.

Category	Country	Song	Artist	Songwriter(s)
Artistic Award	Ireland	"Lipstick"	Jedward	Dan Priddy; Lars Halvor Jensen; Martin Michael Larsson
Composers Award	France	"Sognu"	Amaury Vassili	Daniel Moyne; Quentin Bachelet; Jean-Pierre Marcellesi; Julie Miller
Press Award	Finland	"Da Da Dam"	Paradise Oskar	Axel Ehnström

=== OGAE ===
OGAE, an organisation of over forty Eurovision Song Contest fan clubs across Europe and beyond, conducts an annual voting poll first held in 2002 as the Marcel Bezençon Fan Award. After all votes were cast, the top-ranked entry in the 2011 poll was Hungary's "What About My Dreams?" performed by Kati Wolf; the top five results are shown below.

Country	Song	Artist	Points
Hungary	"What About My Dreams?"	Kati Wolf	277
France	"Sognu"	Amaury Vassili	270
United Kingdom	"I Can"	Blue	253
Sweden	"Popular"	Eric Saade	238
Estonia	"Rockefeller Street"	Getter Jaani	183

=== Barbara Dex Award ===
The Barbara Dex Award is a humorous fan award given to the worst dressed artist each year. Named after Belgium's representative who came last in the 1993 contest, wearing her self-designed dress, the award was handed by the fansite House of Eurovision from 1997 to 2016 and is being carried out by the fansite songfestival.be since 2017.

Place	Country	Artist	Votes
1	Georgia	Eldrine	133
2	Ireland	Jedward	81
3	Moldova	Zdob și Zdub	66
4	Turkey	Yüksek Sadakat	61
5	Portugal	Homens da Luta	59

== Official album ==
Cover art of the official album

Eurovision Song Contest: Düsseldorf 2011 was the official compilation album of the 2011 contest, put together by the European Broadcasting Union and released by EMI Records and CMC International on 15 April 2011. The album featured all 43 songs that entered in the 2011 contest, including the semi-finalists that failed to qualify into the grand final.

=== Charts ===
Chart (2011)	Peak position
German Compilation Albums (Offizielle Top 100)	2

== See also ==
- Eurovision Young Dancers 2011
- Junior Eurovision Song Contest 2011
