= Greece in the Eurovision Song Contest 2011 =

- Eurovision Song Contest 2011
- Participating broadcaster: Hellenic Broadcasting Corporation (ERT)
- Country: Greece
- Selection process: Ellinikós Telikós 2011
- Selection date: 2 March 2011

Competing entry
- Song: "Watch My Dance"
- Artist: Loukas Yorkas feat. Stereo Mike
- Songwriters: Giannis Christodoulopoulos; Eleana Vrahali

Placement
- Semi-final result: Qualified (1st, 133 points)
- Final result: 7th, 120 points

Participation chronology

Greece was represented at the Eurovision Song Contest 2011 with the song "Watch My Dance", written by Giannis Christodoulopoulos and Eleana Vrahali, and performed by Loukas Yorkas featuring Stereo Mike. The Greek participating broadcaster, the Hellenic Broadcasting Corporation (ERT), organised the national final Ellinikós Telikós 2011 to select its entry for the contest. Six competing acts—Antigoni Psihrami, Kokkina Halia, Yorkas, Nikki Ponte, Trimitonio, and Valando Tryfonos—performed their prospective entries live during the televised event on 2 March 2011, with the winner selected by a combination of a public televote and a panel of judges.

To promote the entry, Yorkas and Stereo Mike made appearances in Belgium, Cyprus, the Netherlands, Turkey, and the UK, performing the song and meeting with local media. Greece took part in the first semi-final of the contest on 10 May 2011 and qualified for the final, placing first with 133 points. At the 14 May final, Yorkas and Stereo Mike performed "Watch My Dance" ninth out of the 25 participants and at the end of voting, was awarded seventh place, marking Greece's eighth consecutive top 10 placing since 2004.

== Background ==
Prior to the 2011 contest, Greece had participated in the Eurovision Song Contest 31 times since their first entry in 1974. To this point, they won the contest once, in 2005 with the song "My Number One" performed by Helena Paparizou, and placed third three times: in 2001 with the song "Die for You" performed by the duo Antique; in 2004 with "Shake It" performed by Sakis Rouvas; and in 2008 with "Secret Combination" performed by Kalomira. Following the introduction of semi-finals for the 2004 contest, Greece qualified for the final each year. Their least successful result was in 1998 when they placed 20th with the song "Mia krifi evaisthisia" by Thalassa, receiving only 12 points in total, all from Cyprus.

As part of its duties as participating broadcaster, the Hellenic Broadcasting Corporation (ERT) organises the selection of its entry in the Eurovision Song Contest and broadcasts the event in the country. Although its selection techniques have varied over the decades, the most common has been a national final in which various acts compete against each other with pre-selected songs, voted on by a jury, televoters, or both. In most cases, internal selections have been reserved for high-profile acts, with the song either being selected internally or with multiple songs —by one or multiple composers— performed by the artist during a televised final. A departure from this method was a reality television talent competition format inspired by the Idol series that ran for many months in 2004, ultimately being scrapped.

== Before Eurovision ==
=== Ellinikós Telikós 2011 ===
Ellinikós Telikós 2011 was the Greek national final developed by ERT to select the Greek entry for the Eurovision Song Contest 2011. The competition took place on 2 March 2011 at the ERT studios in Athens at 22:00 CET, hosted by Lena Aroni. The show was televised on NET and ERT World, and was also viewable online through the ERT website eurovision.ert.gr and the official Eurovision Song Contest website eurovision.tv. The national final was watched by an estimated 836,000 viewers in Greece, with a market share of 17.4% according to ABG Nielsen Hellas.

ERT initially explored taking a completely different approach for the 2011 contest, also looking to take a more modest approach to their participation in the contest in comparison to previous years when the contest was viewed as a national event. The new board of members at ERT quickly realized that time was not sufficient, and thus turned to the more traditional selection method of co-operating with record labels. ERT also explored the option of selecting an act internally, as it had done in previous years, but was unable to secure a major act. After the failed talks of internal selections, ERT decided to hold a six-performer national final to choose the song to represent them, with all of the acts having been recent participants on a reality talent competition, either The X Factor or Greek Idol. Compared to previous years, both ERT and the Ministry of Culture and Tourism had toned down efforts for 2011.

==== Competing entries ====
After requesting proposals from record labels, six artists, all from the talent shows The X Factor Greece and Greek Idol, were selected by ERT to participate in the national final. The decision to select young newcomer acts was to appeal to a younger audience, while also giving the emerging acts a chance to further their careers through their participation in the competition. The six acts—Antigoni Psihrami, Kokkina Halia, Yorkas, Nikki Ponte, Trimitonio, and Valando Tryfonos—were announced on 11 January 2011; the artists and their respective record labels then had until 4 February 2011 to submit their songs. Following the submission deadline, one-minute samples of the competing songs premiered on ERT radio station Deftero 103.7 (ERA2) on 9 February 2011. The samples were also available on the eurovision.ert.gr website, and included the performers, writers and lyrics. The songs in their entirety were scheduled to be presented on 15 February 2011 during a special program, hosted by Lena Aroni and televised on NET, however all six songs were leaked by news website Newsit.gr the day of the program.

==== Final ====
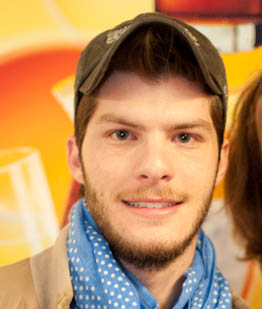
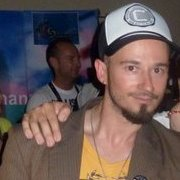
Loukas Yorkas (left) and Stereo Mike (right) were selected as the representatives for Greece in the Eurovision Song Contest 2011 with the song "Watch My Dance".

The final took place on 2 March 2011. The six acts competed and the winner, "Watch My Dance" performed by Loukas Yorkas feat. Stereo Mike, was selected by a 50/50 combination of public voting and jury voting. The song was written by Giannis Christodoulopoulos with lyrics by Eleana Vrahali, and was performed in English and Greek, with a fusion of hip hop and contemporary laïkó styles. The jury consisted of Marina Lahana (radio producer and Head of ERA2), Mihalis Tasousopoulos (radio producer), Andreas Pilarinos (conductor), Giorgos Parianos (songwriter) and Bessy Malfa (actress). Public voting was conducted through telephone or SMS. In addition to the performances of the competing entries, the interval acts featured guest performances by 2011 Bulgarian Eurovision entrant Poli Genova, 2011 Cypriot Eurovision entrant Christos Mylordos, 2011 Maltese Eurovision entrant Glen Vella and American musician David Lynch. A total of 85,801 public votes were cast during the final, of which 47,821 were by SMS and 37,980 by televoting.

Final – 2 March 2011
R/O	Artist	Song	Jury	Televote	Total	Place	Songwriter(s)	Label
1	Kokkina Halia	"Come with Me"	5	5	10	6	Kokkina Halia, Andreas Galanopoulos	Sony Music Greece
2	Valando Tryfonos	"The Time Is Now"	6	6	12	5	Johan Ramström, Patrik Magnusson, Martti Vuorinen	Sony Music Greece
3	Trimitonio	"Hamogela"	12	7	19	2	Nikos Terzis, Vaggelis Konstantinidis	7
4	Antigoni Psihrami	"It's All Greek to Me!"	7	8	15	4	Apostolos Psihramis, Dimitris S., Gerard James Borg	Minos EMI
5	Loukas Yorkas feat. Stereo Mike	"Watch My Dance"	10	12	22	1	Giannis Christodoulopoulos, Eleana Vrahali	Minos EMI
6	Nikki Ponte	"I Don't Wanna Dance"	8	10	18	3	Jonas Saeed, Pia Sjöberg	Sony Music Greece

==== Reception and criticism ====
Shortly after ERT announced the six acts, criticism surrounding the selection procedure arose from multiple parties. Music acts and record labels accused the broadcaster of not publishing any rules, regulations, or a deadline concerning the selection procedure, and criticized the lack of transparency from the publicly funded broadcaster. Singers Giannis Savidakis, Theoharis Ioanidis, Sofia Berntson featuring Apollon, rapper Bo, and bands Nomisma, and Zante Dilemma featuring Emily Greenslade were amongst the acts that spoke out against ERT. Their respective record labels also put out press releases expressing their complaints, with ERT remaining silent on the issues. Record labels also questioned the legality of ERT's decisions.

Giannis Savidakis, who represented Cyprus in the Eurovision Song Contest 1989, and Theoharis Ioanidis, an actor who made his singing debut on Mega Channel's celebrity reality singing contest Just the Two of Us in 2010, were two of the most vocal acts to speak out. Both were on ERT’s initial shortlist, with them having self-confirmed their bids days prior through the media, although both were ultimately cut. Savidakis criticized ERT's open call, stating that the broadcaster was vague in its criteria for a prospective entry and questioned why ERT did not give him a reason for his cut. Ioanidis also criticized ERT's decision, with Ioanidis' manager, Ilias Psinakis—who also managed pop-stars and former national final participants Sakis Rouvas and Kostas Martakis in the past—stating his belief that the public should be the ones to decide who is right to fill the role. Psinakis also claimed that Stefanos Korkolis was to be the author of Ioanidis' prospective entry, while he blamed politics for playing a role in the rejection, as he is a member of rival political party Popular Orthodox Rally (LAOS). On 15 January 2011, LAOS MP Georgios Anatolakis brought up the issue in the Hellenic Parliament, asking the Minister of Culture Pavlos Geroulanos, who helps oversee ERT, for clarifications on Ioanidis' and Savidakis' rejections. On 27 January 2011, ERT issued an official press release standing by their selection process, and addressed complaints from rejected artists and labels. ERT stated that they chose to work with major labels only, and thus rejected bids from various minor labels, while they only wished to include young up and coming artists in the selection process. Furthermore, they stated that they only chose acts that are primarily professional singers. In response to the press release by ERT, Theoharis Ioanidis, Nomisma, and Bo threatened legal action against ERT. Nomisma stated they planned to sue ERT and ask to block the national final from happening, as well as financial compensation.

=== Promotion ===
On 25 March 2011, Yorkas and Stereo Mike traveled to London as guests of the Greek National Tourism Organization. Yorkas and Konstantinos Rigas, the song's choreographer and artistic director, were guests on London Greek Radio, while that evening, Stereo Mike joined to perform "Watch My Dance" at the Live Music Awards of LDR. This was followed by an interview on Hellenic TV. For the two following days, they performed live at the Westfield London mall. On 7 April, Yorkas and Stereo Mike visited Belgium where they met with members of the Greek diaspora and were interviewed by Belgian media. The next day, they met with Greek communities in the Netherlands followed by interviews with Dutch and international media on 9 April in Amsterdam. This also included being one of several participants of 2011 who participated in the third annual Eurovision in Concert series, an event held at Club Air in Amsterdam staged to serve as a preview party for the year's entries. On 15 and 16 April, the pair continued their tour, heading to Istanbul, Turkey on a trip organised by record label EMI Greece. In additional to interviews with local media, they met Yüksek Sadakat, who was representing Turkey in the Eurovision Song Contest 2011 and performed an unplugged version of "Watch My Dance". The last promotional stop before heading to the contest was in Cyprus on 26 April, where Yorkas and Stereo Mike appeared on the Cyprus Broadcasting Corporation show Eho kardia (Έχω καρδιά).

== At Eurovision ==
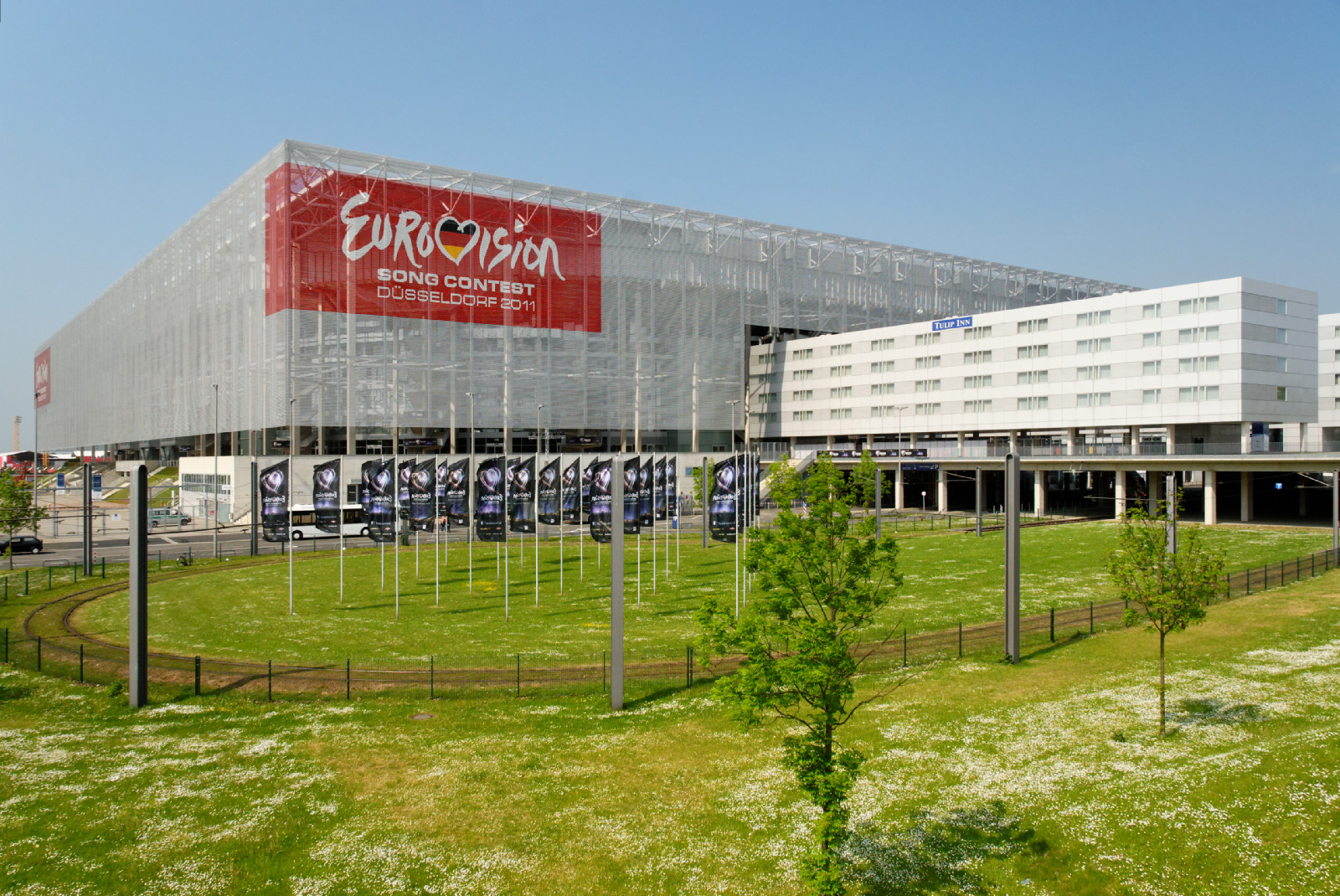
Espirit Arena, host venue of the 2011 contest.

The Eurovision Song Contest 2011 took place at the Espirit Arena in Düsseldorf, Germany. It consisted of two semi-finals held on 10 and 12 May, respectively, and the final on 14 May 2011. According to the Eurovision rules, all participating countries, except the host nation and the "Big Five", consisting of France, Germany, Italy, Spain and the United Kingdom, were required to qualify from one of the two semi-finals to compete for the final; the top 10 countries from the respective semi-finals would proceed to the final.

On 17 January 2011, an allocation draw was held that placed each country into one of the two semi-finals, with Greece being placed into the second half of the first semi-final, to be held on 10 May. Once all the competing songs for the Eurovision Song Contest 2011 had been released, the running order for the semi-finals was decided by another draw, which was held on 15 March in Düsseldorf. The nation was assigned to perform at position 19, following Azerbaijan and closing the show. The first semi-final was televised on NET within Greece, with the second semi-final and the final on ERT. All three shows were also available on ERT's website as well as on ERT HD, which was piloting high definition broadcasts at the time. Radio broadcasts of the shows were on Deftero 103.7, ERA 5 and the 19 regional stations of ERA. Maria Kozakou provided commentary for both the television and radio broadcasts.

=== Performances ===
Artistic direction and choreography for the performance was managed by Konstantinos Rigos. Yorkas and Stereo Mike were joined on stage by four dancers: Giannis Saikin, Michalis Spyridis, Manos Davarias and Pavlos Manogiannakis. The ensemble began rehearsals for their performance on 30 April 2011, followed by the first official rehearsal at the Esprit Arena on 2 May, and the second on 6 May. Dress rehearsals for the first semi-final participants then took place on 9 and 10 May. The Greek performance saw Yorkas dressed in a black leather jacket with a white shirt and black pants. The stage surrounding him was filled with shades of purple with white Greek columns superimposed on blue flames and silk curtains. The dancers were largely motionless throughout the show, with movement only during the verses sung by Stereo Mike, and when one of them joined Yorkas for a choreographed routine.

At the end of the semi-final, Greece was announced as placing first out of the 19 competing nations in the first semi-final. In the final, held four days later, Yorkas and Stereo Mike performed a repeat of their semi-final performance with only minor directorial changes. The entry ended in seventh place out of the 25 finalists, marking their eighth consecutive top-10 place since the introduction of the semi-finals in 2004. This result, however, was also the worst scoring final placement for an entry that had placed first in a semi-final.

=== Voting ===
Voting during the three shows involved each country awarding points from 1-8, 10 and 12 as determined by a combination of 50% national jury and 50% televoting. Each nation's jury consisted of five music industry professionals who are citizens of the country they represent. This jury judged each entry based on: vocal capacity; the stage performance; the song's composition and originality; and the overall impression by the act. In addition, no member of a national jury was permitted to be related in any way to any of the competing acts in such a way that they cannot vote impartially and independently. In the first semi-final, Greece placed first with 133 points, which included the top 12 points from Portugal. In the final, Greece placed seventh with 120 points, which included 12 points from Cyprus. The nation awarded 12 points to Albania in the first semi-final and to France in the final. Lena Aroni was the Greek spokesperson announcing the country's voting results. The tables below visualise a complete breakdown of points awarded to Greece in both the first semi-final and the final of the Eurovision Song Contest 2011, as well as by the country on both occasions.

==== Points awarded to Greece ====
Points awarded to Greece (Semi-final 1)
Score	Country
12 points	Portugal
10 points	Albania; Armenia; Azerbaijan; Hungary
8 points	Croatia; United Kingdom
7 points	Georgia; Poland; Serbia; Spain; Switzerland
6 points	Russia; San Marino
5 points	Malta
4 points	Finland; Lithuania; Turkey
3 points	
2 points	
1 point	Norway

Points awarded to Greece (Final)
Score	Country
12 points	Cyprus
10 points	Albania; Bulgaria; Germany
8 points	Azerbaijan; Belgium; Hungary; Romania; Russia; San Marino
7 points	Armenia
6 points	Georgia; Ukraine
5 points	
4 points	
3 points	Macedonia; Serbia
2 points	Italy; Switzerland
1 point	Moldova

==== Points awarded by Greece ====
Points awarded by Greece (Semi-final 1)
Score	Country
12 points	Albania
10 points	Georgia
8 points	Armenia
7 points	Azerbaijan
6 points	Iceland
5 points	Hungary
4 points	Lithuania
3 points	Russia
2 points	San Marino
1 point	Portugal

Points awarded by Greece (Final)
Score	Country
12 points	France
10 points	Italy
8 points	Georgia
7 points	Ukraine
6 points	Sweden
5 points	Azerbaijan
4 points	Germany
3 points	Bosnia and Herzegovina
2 points	United Kingdom
1 point	Russia
