= Portugal in the Eurovision Song Contest 2011 =

- Eurovision Song Contest 2011
- Participating broadcaster: Rádio e Televisão de Portugal (RTP)
- Country: Portugal
- Selection process: Festival da Canção 2011
- Selection date: 5 March 2011

Competing entry
- Song: "A luta é alegria"
- Artist: Homens da Luta
- Songwriters: Vasco Duarte; Jel

Placement
- Semi-final result: Failed to qualify (18th)

Participation chronology

Portugal was represented at the Eurovision Song Contest 2011 with the song "A luta é alegria" written by Vasco Duarte and Jel, and performed by the group Homens da Luta. The Portuguese participating broadcaster, Rádio e Televisão de Portugal (RTP), organised the national final Festival da Canção 2011 in order to select its entry for the contest. The competition took place on 5 March 2011 where "A luta é alegria" performed by Homens da Luta emerged as the winner after achieving the highest score following the combination of votes from twenty regional juries and a public televote.

Portugal was drawn to compete in the first semi-final of the Eurovision Song Contest which took place on 10 May 2011. Performing during the show in position 16, A luta é alegria" was not announced among the top 10 entries of the first semi-final and therefore did not qualify to compete in the final. It was later revealed that Portugal placed eighteenth out of the 19 participating countries in the semi-final with 22 points.

== Background ==
Prior to the 2011 contest, Radiotelevisão Portuguesa (RTP) until 2003, and Rádio e Televisão de Portugal (RTP) since 2004, had participated in the Eurovision Song Contest representing Portugal forty-four times since their first entry in 1964. Their highest placing in the contest was sixth, achieved in 1996 with the song "O meu coração não tem cor" performed by Lúcia Moniz. Following the introduction of semi-finals for the 2004, Portugal had featured in only three finals. Their least successful result has been last place, achieved on three occasions, most recently in 1997 with the song "Antes do adeus" performed by Célia Lawson. They have also received nul points on two occasions: in 1964 and 1997. The nation qualified to the final in 2010 and placed eighteenth with the song "Há dias assim" performed by Filipa Azevedo.

As part of its duties as participating broadcaster, RTP organises the selection of its entry in the Eurovision Song Contest and broadcasts the event in the country. The broadcaster confirmed its participation in the 2011 contest on 5 November 2010. RTP has traditionally selected its entry for the contest via the music competition Festival da Canção, with exceptions in 1988 and in 2005 when the entries were internally selected. Along with its participation confirmation, RTP revealed details regarding its selection procedure and announced the organization of Festival da Canção 2011 in order to select the 2011 Portuguese entry.

== Before Eurovision ==
=== Festival da Canção 2011 ===
The logo of Festival da Canção 2011

Festival da Canção 2011 was the 47th edition of Festival da Canção that selected Portugal's entry for the Eurovision Song Contest 2011. Twelve entries competed in the competition which took place on 5 March 2011 at the Teatro Camões in Lisbon. The show was hosted by Sílvia Alberto with Joana Teles hosting from the green room and broadcast on RTP1, RTP1 HD, RTP África and RTP Internacional as well as online via the broadcaster's official website rtp.pt.

==== Competing entries ====
Artists and composers were able to submit their entries for the competition between 19 November 2010 and 16 January 2011. Composers of any nationality were allowed to submit entries, however artists were required to possess Portuguese citizenship and songs were required to be submitted in Portuguese. A jury panel consisting of Head of Delegation for Portugal at the Eurovision Song Contest José Poiares, and music producers Fernando Martins and Ramón Galarza selected twenty-four entries for an online vote from 407 submissions received, which were revealed on 19 January 2011. On 22 January 2011, "Por ti", written and to have been performed by António José Silva, "Um sinal", written by Bettershell and Isaías Ricardo de Oliveira and to have been performed by Bettershell, and "Amor cruzado", written and to have been performed by Miguel Gizzas, were disqualified from the competition due to the songs having been released or performed prior to 1 October 2010.

90-second excerpts of the twenty-one competing entries were released online via rtp.pt on 20 January 2011 and users were able to vote by distributing three votes to their favourite songs until 27 January 2011. 222,764 valid votes were received at the conclusion of the voting period and the top twelve entries that advanced to the final were revealed on 28 January 2011.

Results of the online vote – 20–27 January 2011
R/O	Artist	Song	Songwriter(s)	Votes	Place
1	Homens da Luta	"A luta é alegria"	Vasco Duarte, Jel	17,374	1
2	Alma Real	"Não quero falar"	Thorsten Rath, Sérgio de Oliveira	12,431	13
3	Sandra Dória	"Aprende a voar (Nas asas do amor)"	Luís Filipe Aguilar	2,470	18
4	Woodu	"O tempo resolve tudo"	Bem Talbot, José Cid, Ana Sofia Cid	261	21
5	Emanuel Santos	"Não estamos sós"	Ralph Siegel, Bernd Meinunger, Pedro Coelho	694	20
6	Nádia Correia	"Sonhos do verbo amar"	Ricardo Verdelho	11,651	15
7	Henrique Feist	"Quase a voar"	Nuno Feist, José Fanha	13,844	8
8	Wanda Stuart	"Chegar à tua voz"	Paul Teixeira da Sousa	14,394	2
9	Tânia Tavares	"Se esse dia chegar"	Gorgi, Tânia Tavares, Nuno Valério	13,592	11
10	Rui Andrade	"Em nome do amor"	Artur Guimarães, Carlos Meireles	13,656	10
11	Carla Ribeiro	"Só acontece uma vez"	João Sanguilheira, João Novo	4,862	17
12	Inês Bernardo	"Deixa o meu lugar"	Leonel Monteiro, Joana Ferraz	14,105	3
13	Axel	"Boom Boom Yeah"	José Félix, Axel	13,448	12
14	Carla Pires	"Voar alto"	Artur Guimarães, Paulo Pires de Lima	11,967	14
15	7Saias	"Embalo do coração"	Páquito C. Braziel, Ana Rita Rebello	14,056	6
16	Carla Moreno	"Sobrevivo"	Andrej Babić, Carlos Coelho	13,868	7
17	Filipa Ruas	"Tensão"	Daniel Nilsson, Henrik Szabo, Johnny Sanchez, Jonas Gladnikoff, Mike Eriksson, Filipa Ruas, Pedro Sá	14,058	5
18	Daniela Galbin	"Amor a sério"	Pedro Saraiva, Daniela Galbin	829	19
19	Nuno Norte	"São os barcos de Lisboa"	Carlos Massa	13,817	9
20	Pop Pin's	"Esta noite vamos curtir"	José Cardoso, Guy Ribeiro	7,325	16
21	Ricardo Sousa	"O mar, o vento, e as estrelas"	Carlos Freitas, Fernando Guerreiro	14,062	4

==== Final ====
The final took place on 5 March 2011. Twelve entries competed and the winner, "A luta é alegria" performed by Homens da Luta, was selected based on the 50/50 combination of votes of twenty regional juries and a public televote. In addition to the performances of the competing entries, Portuguese Eurovision 1967 entrant Eduardo Nascimento, Portuguese Eurovision 2010 entrant Filipa Azevedo and Maltese Eurovision 2011 entrant Glen Vella performed as the interval act.

Final – 5 March 2011
R/O	Artist	Song	Jury		Televote		Total	Place
R/O	Artist	Song	Votes	Points	Percentage	Points	Total	Place
1	7Saias	"Embalo do coração"	129	8	4.12%	2	10	8
2	Carla Moreno	"Sobrevivo"	33	1	4.74%	4	5	11
3	Nuno Norte	"São os barcos de Lisboa"	174	12	5.75%	5	17	2
4	Rui Andrade	"Em nome do amor"	106	5	15.85%	10	15	3
5	Henrique Feist	"Quase a voar"	96	4	8.11%	6	10	6
6	Wanda Stuart	"Chegar à tua voz"	116	7	4.55%	3	10	7
7	Tânia Tavares	"Se esse dia chegar"	116	7	2.54%	0	7	10
8	Inês Bernardo	"Deixa o meu lugar"	161	10	2.49%	0	10	9
9	Filipa Ruas	"Tensão"	38	2	11.34%	8	10	4
10	Homens da Luta	"A luta é alegria"	113	6	27.11%	12	18	1
11	Axel	"Boom Boom Yeah"	4	0	2.56%	1	1	12
12	Ricardo Sousa	"O mar, o vento, e as estrelas"	74	3	10.85%	7	10	5

Detailed Regional Jury Votes
R/O	Song	Aveiro	Beja	Braga	Bragança	Castelo Branco	Coimbra	Évora	Faro	Madeira	Guarda	Leiria	Lisbon	Azores	Portalegre	Porto	Santarém	Setúbal	Viana do Castelo	Vila Real	Viseu	Total score
1	"Embalo do coração"	6	6	12	6	10	7	3	5	6	8	4	12	8	2	12	8	2	2	3	7	129
2	"Sobrevivo"	1	1	4			1	2	10	2		1	3							8		33
3	"São os barcos de Lisboa"	4	7	6	10	6	10	10	12	10	12	5	7	10	8	8	12	5	12	12	8	174
4	"Em nome do amor"	12	8	2		8	2	5	2	12	2	2	2	5	5	6	10	12	7	2	2	106
5	"Quase a voar"	7	2	5	3	4	5	8	3	5	4	10	10	3	7	3	5	4	5		3	96
6	"Chegar à tua voz"	8	5	10	2	2	3	6	1	7	1	8	5	12	6	4	2	8	10	6	10	116
7	"Se esse dia chegar"	5	10	3	5	5	8	4	6	3	3	7	8	4	10	5	4	10	4	7	5	116
8	"Deixa o meu lugar"	10	12	8	7	3	12	12	4	8	5	12	6	7	12	7	7	7	8	10	4	161
9	"Tensão"				4				7	1	7				4	2	1	6	1	5	1	38
10	"A luta é alegria"	2	4	7	12	7	6	1	8	4	10	6	1	6	3	10	6	1	3	4	12	113
11	"Boom Boom Yeah"			1	1	1								1								4
12	"O mar, o vento, e as estrelas"	3	3		8	12	4	7			6	3	4	2	1	2	3	3	6	1	6	74

=== Controversy ===
The outcome of Festival da Canção 2011 caused much controversy as most of the audience had left the venue in protest after the victory of Homens da Luta was announced. Criticism was also received from runner-up Nuno Norte who raised concerns of whether the winner was "what the public wants to see at Eurovision" (despite "A luta é alegria" winning the televote). The group, who claimed to be "the struggling people of Portugal", attended a previously scheduled concert following the competition with lead singer Jel stating: "People are joining the struggle, every time you hear someone singing the song in the streets, it is someone else that is joining the struggle".

== At Eurovision ==
According to Eurovision rules, all nations with the exceptions of the host country and the "Big Five" (France, Germany, Italy, Spain and the United Kingdom) are required to qualify from one of two semi-finals in order to compete for the final; the top ten countries from each semi-final progress to the final. The European Broadcasting Union (EBU) split up the competing countries into six different pots based on voting patterns from previous contests, with countries with favourable voting histories put into the same pot. On 17 January 2011, a special allocation draw was held which placed each country into one of the two semi-finals, as well as which half of the show they would perform in. Portugal was placed into the first semi-final, to be held on 10 May 2011, and was scheduled to perform in the second half of the show. The running order for the semi-finals was decided through another draw on 15 March 2011 and Portugal was set to perform in position 16, following the entry from Hungary and before the entry from Lithuania.

In Portugal, the three shows were broadcast on RTP1, RTP1 HD and RTP Internacional with commentary by Sílvia Alberto. The first semi-final and the final were broadcast live, while the second semi-final was broadcast on delay. The Portuguese spokesperson, who announced the Portuguese votes during the final, was Joana Teles.

=== Semi-final ===
Homens da Luta took part in technical rehearsals on 2 and 6 May, followed by dress rehearsals on 9 and 10 May. This included the jury final where professional juries of each country watched and voted on the competing entries.

The Portuguese performance featured six of the members of Homens da Luta dressed in outfits representing various communities in Portugal, four of them which performed with signs displaying the title of the song, "A luta é alegria", in several European languages and one of them which performed with a megaphone. The LED screens displayed red and green flowers which symbolise the Carnation Revolution in 1974.

At the end of the show, Portugal was not announced among the top 10 entries in the first semi-final and therefore failed to qualify to compete in the final. It was later revealed that Portugal placed eighteenth in the semi-final, receiving a total of 22 points.

=== Voting ===
Voting during the three shows involved each country awarding points from 1-8, 10 and 12 as determined by a combination of 50% national jury and 50% televoting. Each nation's jury consisted of five music industry professionals who are citizens of the country they represent. This jury judged each entry based on: vocal capacity; the stage performance; the song's composition and originality; and the overall impression by the act. In addition, no member of a national jury was permitted to be related in any way to any of the competing acts in such a way that they cannot vote impartially and independently.

Following the release of the full split voting by the EBU after the conclusion of the competition, it was revealed that Portugal had placed fifteenth with both the public televote and nineteenth (last) in the jury vote in the first semi-final. In the public vote, Portugal scored 39 points, while with the jury vote, Portugal scored 6 points.

Below is a breakdown of points awarded to Portugal and awarded by Portugal in the first semi-final and grand final of the contest. The nation awarded its 12 points to Greece in the semi-final and to Spain in the final of the contest.

==== Points awarded to Portugal ====
Points awarded to Portugal (Semi-final 1)
Score	Country
12 points	
10 points	
8 points	Spain
7 points	
6 points	
5 points	
4 points	Albania; Switzerland
3 points	United Kingdom
2 points	Georgia
1 point	Greece

==== Points awarded by Portugal ====
Points awarded by Portugal (Semi-final 1)
Score	Country
12 points	Greece
10 points	Iceland
8 points	Finland
7 points	Azerbaijan
6 points	Lithuania
5 points	Switzerland
4 points	Albania
3 points	Russia
2 points	Norway
1 point	Serbia

Points awarded by Portugal (Final)
Score	Country
12 points	Spain
10 points	Italy
8 points	Azerbaijan
7 points	Ukraine
6 points	Ireland
5 points	Moldova
4 points	Iceland
3 points	United Kingdom
2 points	France
1 point	Slovenia
