= Lithuania in the Eurovision Song Contest 2011 =

- Eurovision Song Contest 2011
- Country: Lithuania
- Selection process: "Eurovizijos" dainų konkurso nacionalinė atranka
- Selection date: 24 February 2011

Competing entry
- Song: "C'est ma vie"
- Artist: Evelina Sašenko
- Songwriters: Paulius Zdanavičius; Andrius Kairys

Placement
- Semi-final result: Qualified (5th, 81 points)
- Final result: 19th, 63 points

Participation chronology

Lithuania was represented at the Eurovision Song Contest 2011 with the song "C'est ma vie", written by Paulius Zdanavičius and Andrius Kairys. The song was performed by Evelina Sašenko. The Lithuanian broadcaster Lithuanian National Radio and Television (LRT) organised the national final "Eurovizijos" dainų konkurso nacionalinė atranka (Eurovision Song Contest national selection) in order to select the Lithuanian entry for the 2011 contest in Düsseldorf, Germany. The national final took place over four weeks and involved 40 competing entries. In the final, thirteen artists and songs remained and the winner was selected over two rounds of voting. In the first round, the combination of votes from a jury panel and a public vote selected the top three to qualify to the superfinal. In the superfinal, a jury vote entirely selected "C'est ma vie" performed by Evelina Sašenko as the winner.

Lithuania was drawn to compete in the first semi-final of the Eurovision Song Contest, which took place on 10 May 2011. Performing during the show in position 17, "C'est ma vie" was announced among the top 10 entries of the first semi-final and therefore qualified to compete in the final on 12 May. It was later revealed that Lithuania placed fifth out of the 19 participating countries in the semi-final with 81 points. In the final, Lithuania performed in position 4 and placed nineteenth out of the 25 participating countries, scoring 63 points.

== Background ==
Prior to the 2011 contest, Lithuania had participated in the Eurovision Song Contest eleven times since its first entry in 1994. The nation’s best placing in the contest was sixth, which it achieved in 2006 with the song "We Are the Winners", performed by LT United. Following the introduction of semi-finals in 2004, Lithuania, to this point, had managed to qualify to the final three times. In the 2010 contest, "Eastern European Funk" performed by InCulto failed to qualify to the final.

For the 2011 contest, the Lithuanian national broadcaster, Lithuanian National Radio and Television (LRT), broadcast the event within Lithuania and organised the selection process for the nation's entry. Other than the internal selection of their debut entry in 1994, Lithuania has selected their entry consistently through a national final procedure. LRT confirmed their intentions to participate at the 2011 Eurovision Song Contest on 24 November 2010 and announced the organization of "Eurovizijos" dainų konkurso nacionalinė atranka, which would be the national final to select Lithuania's entry for Düsseldorf.

== Before Eurovision ==
=== "Eurovizijos" dainų konkurso nacionalinė atranka ===
"Eurovizijos" dainų konkurso nacionalinė atranka (Eurovision Song Contest national selection) was the national final format developed by LRT in order to select Lithuania's entry for the Eurovision Song Contest 2011. The competition involved a four-week-long process that commenced on 5 February 2011 and concluded with a winning song and artist on 24 February 2011. The four shows took place at the LRT studios in Vilnius and were hosted by Giedrius Masalskis. The shows were broadcast on LTV, LTV World, and Lietuvos Radijas, as well as online via the broadcaster's website lrt.lt. The final was also streamed online on the official Eurovision Song Contest website eurovision.tv.

==== Format ====
The 2011 competition involved 40 entries and consisted of four shows. The first three shows were the semi-finals, consisting of twelve or fourteen entries each. The top three entries from each semi-final proceeded to the final, while four wildcard acts were also selected for the final out of the remaining non-qualifying acts from the semi-finals. Three of the wildcards were selected by LRT, while an additional wildcard was selected by the public through an internet voting platform on the website zebra.lt. In the final, the winner was selected from the remaining fourteen entries over two rounds of voting. The first round results selected the top three entries, while the second round determined the winner. A monetary prize of 25,000 LTL was also awarded to the winning artist(s) by the Lithuanian Copyright Protection Association (LATGA) in order to assist in their preparation for the Eurovision Song Contest.

The results of each of the five shows were determined by a jury panel and public televoting. The qualifiers of the semi-finals and the first round of the final were determined by the 50/50 combination of votes from the jury and public. The ranking developed by both streams of voting was converted to points from 1-8, 10 and 12 and assigned based on the number of competing songs in the respective show. The public could vote through telephone and SMS voting. Ties were decided in favour of the entry that received the most points from the jury. In the second round of the final, only the jury voted.

==== Competing entries ====
LRT opened a submission period on 24 November 2010 for artists and songwriters to submit their entries with the deadline on 3 January 2011. On 11 January 2011, LRT announced the 43 entries selected for the competition from 70 submissions received. Among the artists were previous Lithuanian Eurovision contestants Linas Adomaitis, who represented Lithuania in 2004, and Sasha Song, who represented the Lithuania in 2009. The final changes to the list of 43 competing acts were later made with the withdrawal of the songs "Puffy Lips", performed by 24for7, "Will You", performed by Asta Pilypaitė, and "Dreams", performed by Vilija.

Competing entries
Artist	Song	Songwriter(s)
Agnieška	"Her Name Is May"	Agnieška Dobrovolska, Oleg Jerochin
Aurelija Slavinskaitė	"The End"	Georgios Kalpakidis
Avenue Acoustic	"Atgal į nuodėmę"	Karolis Jančenkovas
Dave and Henry	"Fresh Air Dream"	Jacob Gitkind, Nathan Gitkind
Deividas Bastys	"My Girl"	Žilvinas Liulys
Donny Montell	"Let Me"	Donatas Montvydas
Donny Montell and Sasha Son	"Best Friends"	Dmitrij Šavrov
Dovydas Maščinskas	"Dirty Avenue"	Dovydas Maščinskas
EDEN	"Sleep of Mind"	Andrej Viazinin, Marina Sorohan
Eglė Jakštytė	"Love Is Alive"	Monika Mužaitė, Marius Matulevičius
Eglė Petrikaitė	"Laimingi kaip mes"	Dalius Pletniovas
Eglė Petrošiūtė	"Smile"	Eglė Petrošiutė
El Fuego	"Esu žmogus"	Rūta Lukoševičiūtė, Arvydas Skirutis
Evelina Sašenko	"C'est ma vie"	Andrius Kairys, Paulius Zdanavičius
Flaer	"Kibernetiniame sode"	Adomas Stančikas
Gintarė Korsakaitė	"Atmerk akis"	Andrius Guržauskas, Rūta Lukoševičiūtė
Gražina Jonušaitė	"Mylėk savo priešą"	Darius Žvirblis
Greta Šmidt	"Elektronic Love"	Greta Smidt
Guoda Isado	"Čiūto tūto"	Linas Adomaitis, Guoda Juškevičiūtė
The Independent	"7th Bus"	Kipras Varaneckas
Jūratė Miliauskaitė	"Tiesiog diena"	Jūratė Miliauskaitė, Birutė Masiliauskienė
Kas jos tokios?	"Unbreakable"	Hans Karlsen, Filip Racs, Aidan O'Connor
Laura Jaraitė	"City of Steel"	Jonas Krivckas, Mindaugas Stiga
Liepa	"Laukiu"	Liepa Mondeikaitė
Linas Adomaitis	"Floating to You"	Linas Adomaitis, Irma Adomatienė
Martynas Beinaris	"Tomorrow and After"	Martynas Beinaris, Gražina Guobužaitė
Mezzo Tronic	"I Mean It"	Mezzo Tronic
Mino	"Don't Go"	Romualdas Michailovskis, Mindaugas Mickevičius
Monika	"Days Go By"	Monika Linkytė, Irma Adomaitienė
Neferit	"3 Wishes"	Edgaras Lubys
Nora	"What Is Love?"	Marius Leskauskas, Nora Strolytė
Ramūnas Difartas and Gyvo Garso klubas	"Before You Go"	Ramūnas Difartas, Aušra Sutkauskaitė
Rūta Ščiogolevaitė	"I Will Break Free"	Elvin Dandel, Gero Weber
Sasha Son	"The Slogan of Our Nation"	Dmitrij Šavrov
Timohi	"Setellite of Setellite"	Jan Suchodolski, Timohi
Tofu Bubble	"Take"	Tofu Bubble
Urtė Šilagalytė	"Candy Baby"	Urtė Šilagalytė, Stanislavas Stavickis
Valdas Maksvytis	"Leisk mylėti"	Romualdas Michailovskis, Valdas Maksvytis
Vigroses	"Freedom of Mind"	Giedrė Girnytė, Arūnas Rakšnys
Viktorija Ivaškevičiūtė	"Be My Baby"	Viktorija Ivaškevičiūtė, Linas Adomaitis

==== Jury members ====
The jury panel in the semi-finals consisted of five members, while the jury panel in the final consisted of fourteen members.

Jury members by show
Jury member	Semi-finals			Final	Occupation(s)
Jury member	1	2	3	Final	Occupation(s)
Artūras Novikas	No	No	No	Yes	musician
Darius Užkuraitis	Yes	Yes	Yes	Yes	musicologist, Opus 3 director
Eglė Nepaitė	No	Yes	No	Yes	choirmaster, producer
Faustas Latėnas	Yes	No	No	No	composer
Gytis Ivanauskas	Yes	No	No	No	choreographer, dancer
Jonas Vilimas	Yes	No	No	Yes	producer
Laura Remeikienė	No	No	Yes	No	singer-songwriter
Linas Rimša	No	No	No	Yes	composer, jazz singer
Lukas Pačkauskas	No	Yes	No	No	producer
Mindaugas Urbaitis	No	No	Yes	Yes	composer
Neda Malunavičiūtė	No	No	Yes	No	singer
Nijolė Švagždienė	No	No	No	Yes	artistic director of the group DND
Raigardas Tautkus	No	No	No	Yes	composer, producer, singer
Ramūnas Zilnys	No	No	No	Yes	journalist
Rosita Čivilytė	Yes	Yes	No	Yes	singer
Saulius Urbonavičius	No	No	No	Yes	musician, producer, singer
Teisutis Makačinas	No	Yes	No	Yes	composer
Tomas Sinickis	No	No	No	Yes	musician, singer-songwriter
Vaclovas Augustinas	No	No	No	Yes	composer, conductor
Vytautas Juozapaitis	No	No	Yes	No	opera singer

==== Semi-finals ====
The three semi-finals of the competition aired on 5, 12, and 19 February 2011 and featured the 40 competing entries. The top three entries from each semi final advanced to the final, while the bottom entries were eliminated. On 21 February 2011, the four entries that had received a wildcard to also proceed to the final were announced; "Tomorrow and After", performed by Martynas Beinaris, received the zebra.lt wildcard.

Key

Qualifier Wildcard qualifier

Semi-final 1 – 5 February 2011
R/O	Artist	Song	Jury	Televote		Total	Place
R/O	Artist	Song	Jury	Votes	Points	Total	Place
1	Mino	"Don't Go"	2	667	6	8	7
2	Aurelija Slavinskaitė	"The End"	1	145	1	2	12
3	Mezzo Tronic	"I Mean It"	1	174	3	4	9
4	Laura Jaraitė	"City of Steel"	3	89	0	3	10
5	Neferit	"3 Wishes"	0	30	0	0	14
6	The Independent	"7th Bus"	10	722	7	17	2
7	Gintarė Korsakaitė	"Atmerk akis"	4	255	5	9	6
8	Dovydas Maščinskas	"Dirty Avenue"	0	90	0	0	13
9	Monika	"Days Go By"	8	1,432	12	20	1
10	Martynas Beinaris	"Tomorrow and After"	5	911	8	13	5
11	Urtė Šilagalytė	"Candy Baby"	6	1,323	10	16	4
12	Sasha Son	"The Slogan of Our Nation"	12	224	4	16	3
13	Agnieška	"Her Name Is May"	0	170	2	2	11
14	Ramūnas Difartas and Gyvo Garso klubas	"Before You Go"	8	134	0	8	8

Semi-final 2 – 12 February 2011
R/O	Artist	Song	Jury	Televote		Total	Place
R/O	Artist	Song	Jury	Votes	Points	Total	Place
1	Guoda Isado	"Čiūto tūto"	5	582	5	10	6
2	Valdas Maksvytis	"Leisk mylėti"	1	235	1	2	14
3	Vigroses	"Freedom of Mind"	7	912	10	17	2
4	Dave and Henry	"Fresh Air Dream"	8	413	3	11	5
5	Liepa	"Laukiu"	10	765	6	16	3
6	Tofu Bubble	"Take"	4	406	2	6	10
7	Nora	"What Is Love?"	6	204	0	6	9
8	EDEN	"Sleep of Mind"	3	205	0	3	12
9	Eglė Petrikaitė	"Laimingi kaip mes"	0	771	7	7	8
10	Deividas Bastys	"My Girl"	0	800	8	8	7
11	Eglė Jakštytė	"Love Is Alive"	2	171	0	2	13
12	Kas jos tokios?	"Unbreakable"	4	218	0	4	11
13	Evelina Sašenko	"C'est ma vie"	12	1,333	12	24	1
14	Donny Montell	"Let Me"	10	487	4	14	4

Semi-final 3 – 19 February 2011
R/O	Artist	Song	Jury	Televote		Total	Place
R/O	Artist	Song	Jury	Votes	Points	Total	Place
1	Timohi	"Setellite of Setellite"	0	152	2	2	12
2	Eglė Petrošiūtė	"Smile"	1	274	5	6	8
3	Flaer	"Kibernetiniame sode"	2	90	0	2	11
4	Gražina Jonušaitė	"Mylėk savo priešą"	0	216	4	4	10
5	El Fuego	"Esu žmogus"	4	131	1	5	9
6	Greta Šmidt	"Elektronic Love"	4	508	7	11	5
7	Linas Adomaitis	"Floating to You"	10	1,007	12	22	1
8	Viktorija Ivaškevičiūtė	"Be My Baby"	7	977	10	17	3
9	Jūratė Miliauskaitė	"Tiesiog diena"	5	206	3	8	6
10	Avenue Acoustic	"Atgal į nuodėmę"	7	83	0	7	7
11	Donny Montell and Sasha Son	"Best Friends"	8	340	6	14	4
12	Rūta Ščiogolevaitė	"I Will Break Free"	12	634	8	20	2

==== Final ====
The final of the competition took place on 24 February 2011 and featured the remaining thirteen entries that qualified from the semi-finals. The final was the only show in the competition to be broadcast live; all other preceding shows were pre-recorded earlier in the week before their airdates. The winner was selected over two rounds of voting. In the first round, the three entries that gained the most points from the jury vote and the public vote advanced to the superfinal, while the bottom ten were eliminated. In the superfinal, "C'est ma vie" performed by Evelina Sašenko was selected as the winner after gaining maximum points from all jurors. In addition to the performances of the competing entries, Bartas and Eglė Jurgaitytė performed as the interval act.

Final – 24 February 2011
R/O	Artist	Song	Jury		Televote		Total	Place
R/O	Artist	Song	Votes	Points	Votes	Points	Total	Place
1	The Independent	"7th Bus"	52	5	560	0	5	9
2	Viktorija Ivaškevičiūtė	"Be My Baby"	17	0	670	2	2	13
3	Martynas Beinaris	"Tomorrow and After"	1	0	699	3	3	12
4	Monika	"Days Go By"	40	2	3,424	10	12	4
5	Vigroses	"Freedom of Mind"	29	0	913	4	4	11
6	Urtė Šilagalytė	"Candy Baby"	31	1	1,591	5	6	8
7	Linas Adomaitis	"Floating to You"	106	10	2,914	8	18	2
8	Donny Montell	"Let Me"	50	4	1,783	6	10	5
9	Liepa	"Laukiu"	102	8	588	1	9	6
10	Donny Montell and Sasha Son	"Best Friends"	50	4	249	0	4	10
11	Evelina Sašenko	"C'est ma vie"	168	12	5,895	12	24	1
12	Sasha Son	"The Slogan of Our Nation"	67	6	251	0	6	7
13	Rūta Ščiogolevaitė	"I Will Break Free"	99	7	2,253	7	14	3

Superfinal – 24 February 2011
R/O	Artist	Song	Points	Place
1	Linas Adomaitis	"Floating to You"	134	2
2	Evelina Sašenko	"C'est ma vie"	168	1
3	Rūta Ščiogolevaitė	"I Will Break Free"	118	3

== At Eurovision ==
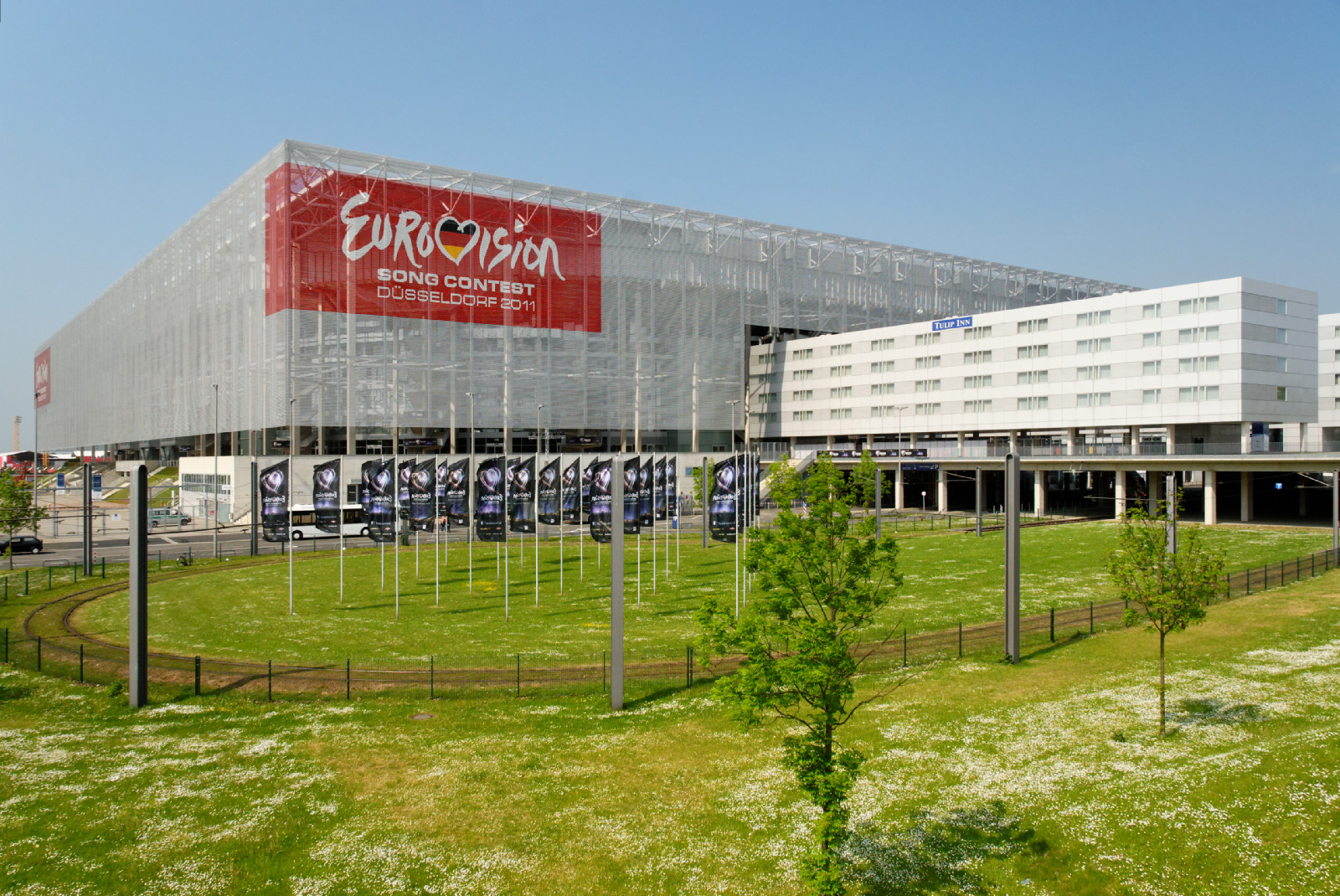
Espirit Arena, host venue of the 2011 contest.

According to Eurovision rules, all nations with the exceptions of the host country and the "Big Five" (France, Germany, Italy, Spain and the United Kingdom) are required to qualify from one of two semi-finals in order to compete for the final; the top ten countries from each semi-final progress to the final. The European Broadcasting Union (EBU) split up the competing countries into six different pots based on voting patterns from previous contests, with countries with favourable voting histories put into the same pot. On 17 January 2011, an allocation draw was held which placed each country into one of the two semi-finals, as well as which half of the show they would perform in. Lithuania was placed into the first semi-final, to be held on 10 May 2011, and was scheduled to perform in the second half of the show. The running order for the semi-finals was decided through another draw on 15 March 2011, and Lithuania was set to perform in position 17, following the entry from Portugal and before the entry from Azerbaijan.

The two semi-finals and final were broadcast in Lithuania on LTV and LTV World with commentary by Darius Užkuraitis. The Lithuanian spokesperson who announced the Lithuanian votes during the final was Giedrius Masalskis.

=== Semi-final ===
Evelina Sašenko took part in technical rehearsals on 1 and 5 May, followed by dress rehearsals on 9 and 10 May. This included the jury show on 9 May, where the professional juries of each country watched and voted on the competing entries.

The Lithuanian performance featured Evelina Sašenko performing on stage in a white dress with black applications on top. The stage was dark at the beginning of the song with a single spotlight concentrating on Sašenko, and the LED screens displayed white stars against a black backdrop, with more light spots later on in the performance. The performance also featured Sašenko using sign language in the second verse of the song. Evelina Sašenko was joined by a pianist, the co-composer of "C'est ma vie" Paulius Zdanavičius, who was dressed in white.

At the end of the show, Lithuania was announced as having finished in the top 10 and subsequently qualifying for the grand final. It was later revealed that Lithuania placed fifth in the semi-final, receiving a total of 81 points.

=== Final ===
Shortly after the first semi-final, a winners' press conference was held for the ten qualifying countries. As part of this press conference, the qualifying artists took part in a draw to determine the running order for the final. This draw was done in the order the countries were announced during the semi-final. Lithuania was drawn to perform in position 25, following the entry from Serbia.

Evelina Sašenko once again took part in dress rehearsals on 13 and 14 May before the final, including the jury final, where the professional juries cast their final votes before the live show. The band performed a repeat of their semi-final performance during the final on 14 May. Lithuania placed nineteenth in the final, scoring 63 points.

=== Voting ===
Voting during the three shows consisted of 50 percent public televoting and 50 percent from a jury deliberation. The jury consisted of five music industry professionals who were citizens of the country they represent. This jury was asked to judge each contestant based on: vocal capacity; the stage performance; the song's composition and originality; and the overall impression by the act. In addition, no member of a national jury could be related in any way to any of the competing acts in such a way that they cannot vote impartially and independently.

Following the release of the full split voting by the EBU after the conclusion of the competition, it was revealed that Lithuania had placed twentieth with both the public televote and the jury vote in the final. In the public vote, Lithuania scored 55 points, while with the jury vote, Lithuania scored 66 points. In the first semi-final, Lithuania placed eleventh with the public televote with 52 points and first with the jury vote, scoring 113 points.

Below is a breakdown of points awarded to Lithuania and awarded by Lithuania in the first semi-final and grand final of the contest. The nation awarded its 12 points to Georgia in the semi-final and the final of the contest.

==== Points awarded to Lithuania ====
Points awarded to Lithuania (Semi-final 1)
Score	Country
12 points	Poland; United Kingdom
10 points	Georgia
8 points	Norway
7 points	Russia
6 points	Portugal
5 points	Hungary; Spain
4 points	Armenia; Greece
3 points	Switzerland
2 points	Finland; Iceland
1 point	Serbia

Points awarded to Lithuania (Final)
Score	Country
12 points	Georgia; Poland
10 points	Ireland
8 points	
7 points	Latvia; Serbia
6 points	United Kingdom
5 points	
4 points	
3 points	Norway
2 points	Croatia; Russia
1 point	Romania; Spain

==== Points awarded by Lithuania ====
Points awarded by Lithuania (Semi-final 1)
Score	Country
12 points	Georgia
10 points	Azerbaijan
8 points	Iceland
7 points	Finland
6 points	Switzerland
5 points	Russia
4 points	Greece
3 points	Serbia
2 points	Poland
1 point	Malta

Points awarded by Lithuania (Final)
Score	Country
12 points	Georgia
10 points	Italy
8 points	Azerbaijan
7 points	Estonia
6 points	Russia
5 points	Serbia
4 points	Moldova
3 points	United Kingdom
2 points	Germany
1 point	Finland
