= Loukas Yorkas =

Greek-Cypriot musician (born 1986)

Loukas Yorkas Λούκας Γιώρκας
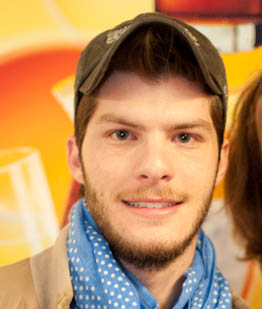
- Yorkas in 2011

Background information
- Born: October 18, 1986 (age 39)
- Origin: Aradippou, Cyprus
- Genres: Laïko, Pop
- Occupation: Singer
- Instruments: Vocals, Guitar
- Years active: 2009–present
- Labels: Sony Music (2009-2011); Minos EMI (2011-2017); Cobalt Music (2017-present)
- Website: loukasyorkas.com

Loukas Yorkas (Greek: Λούκας Γιώρκας; born 18 October 1986), is a Greek Cypriot singer and the winner of the first season of the Greek version of the television talent series The X Factor. In September 2009 he released his first EP album, Mazi, which attained gold certification. He studies Biology at the University of Patras. Loukas Yorkas represented Greece in the Eurovision Song Contest 2011 in Germany along with Stereo Mike, with the song "Watch My Dance", placing seventh with 120 points.

== Career ==
=== 2008 - 2009: The X Factor ===
The path in the show:

- Live 1 - "Eho Mia Agapi"
- Live 2 - "Runaway"
- Live 3 - "Agapi Ti Diskolo Pragma"
- Live 4 - "S' Anazito Sti Saloniki"
- Live 5 - "Bang Bang"
- Live 6 - "Gia To Kalo Mou"
- Live 7 - "I Balanta Tou Kir Mentiou"
- Live 8 - "Instabile"
- Live 9 - "Erotiko"
- Live 10 - "Baby Don't Let Me Be Misunderstood"
- Live 11 - "San Planodio Tsirko" (First Song)
- Live 11 - "Party" (Second Song)
- Live 12 - "Didimotiho Blues" (First Song)
- Live 12 - "Agriolouloudo" (Second Song)
- Final: "Ladadika" (first song), "Piretos", (second song), "Party" (final song)

=== 2010–present ===
On 11 January 2011, Greece's Hellenic Broadcasting Corporation (ERT) announced that Loukas Yorkas was one of six participants in a national final to select Greece's entry in the Eurovision Song Contest 2011. After winning the national final, Yorkas appeared at Eurovision where he placed 7th with 120 points.

== Discography ==
=== EPs ===
- 2009: Mazi

=== Singles ===
- 2010: "Tha Peso, Tha Sikotho"
- 2011: "Watch My Dance" (feat. Stereo Mike)
- 2011: "Gia Proti Fora"
- 2012: "Ematha"
- 2013: "Eklapsa"
- 2014: "Mia Akoma Voutia"
- 2015: "Stin Ousia"
- 2017: "De Pao Sti Douleia"
- 2017: "Stoihima"
- 2018: "Ypokrinesai"
- 2019: "Ela Ilie Mou" (feat. Kostas Tournas)
- 2020: "Mona Liza"
- 2020: "Pame Ap' Tin Arxi"
- 2021: "Mou Eleipses Poly"
- 2021: "Gia Tin Ellada"
- 2022: "An M' Agapas"

Preceded by None	The X Factor (Greece); Winner; 2009	Succeeded by Stavros Michalakakos
Preceded by Giorgos Alkaios & Friends with OPA!	Greece in the Eurovision Song Contest (with Stereo Mike); 2011	Succeeded by Eleftheria Eleftheriou with Aphrodisiac
