= XLI3H =

Album by Stereo Mike

Studio album by Stereo Mike
- Released: May 11, 2007
- Recorded: 2006–2007
- Genre: Hip hop, Rap
- Length: 46:02
- Language: Greek, English
- Label: EMI
- Producer: Stereo Mike

Stereo Mike chronology
| Satirical Nomands (2005) | XLI3H (2007) | Aneli3h (2011) |

Singles from Xli3h
- 1. "Fevgo feat Haris Alexiou" Released: May 2007; 2. "Des Kathara (Face à La Mer) feat Andriana Babali" Released: July 2007; 3. "Anagnorisi feat Mihos24, Lagnis (N.T.P.), Reggae Philharmonic Orchestra" Released: November 2007; 4. "Alli Mia Nihta feat Shaya" Released: September 2008

XLI3H (leet for Greek:Εξέλιξη meaning Evolution) is a hip hop album by 2008 MTV EMA Winner for Best Greek Act Stereo Mike and was released by Minos EMI. Stereo Mike is also the producer of the album.

The album features many collaborations with other artists including Haris Alexiou, Andiana Babali, Shaya, Lagnis {N.T.P.}, Mihos24, Reggae Philharmonic Orchestra, Skrein, Sandman, Ghetto Priest and Zeraw (Tang-Ram).

== Chart performance ==
| Chart | Provider | Peak position |
|---|---|---|
| Greek Albums Chart | IFPI | 22 |

== Sources ==
- Music Corner
- MAD TV Greece
