= Watch My Dance =

2011 single by Loukas Yorkas and Stereo Mike

Single by Loukas Yorkas feat. Stereo Mike
- Released: March 2011
- Recorded: 2011
- Genre: Laïko (zeibekiko), hip hop, Dancehall
- Length: 3:03
- Label: Minos EMI
- Songwriters: Giannis Christodoulopoulos; Eleana Vrachali

Eurovision Song Contest 2011 entry
- Country: Greece
- Artist: Loukas Yorkas
- With: Stereo Mike
- Languages: Greek, English
- Composer: Giannis Christodoulopoulos
- Lyricist: Eleana Vrachali

Finals performance
- Semi-final result: 1st
- Semi-final points: 133
- Final result: 7th
- Final points: 120

Entry chronology
- ◄ "Opa" (2010)
- "Aphrodisiac" (2012) ►

Official performance video
- "Watch My Dance (Final) on YouTube

"Watch My Dance" is a song by Cypriot singer Loukas Yorkas featuring Stereo Mike. It is a laïko song set to a Zeibekiko dance rhythm, performed in Greek by Yiorkas, fused with rapped verses performed in English by Stereo Mike. It represented Greece in the Eurovision Song Contest 2011. A snippet of the song was released by broadcaster Hellenic Broadcasting Corporation (ERT) on 9 February 2011 along with the other candidate songs from the national final, with the full song being presented by the broadcaster on 15 February 2011. On 2 March 2011, Yiorkas won a national final held by the broadcaster, competing against five other acts competing to represent Greece in the contest.

== Background ==
After an open call to record labels to submit proposals, on 11 January 2011, ERT officially announced the six candidates for the Greek national final, amongst them Loukas Yorkas. Loukas Yorkas chose the song "Watch my Dance" featuring Stereo Mike, written by Giannis Christodoulopoulos with lyrics by Eleana Vrahali. The lyrics are sung in Greek by Yiorkas and features English rapping by Stereo Mike. The song is a fusion of hip hop and dancehall with the distinctively Greek music genres of zeibekiko and laïkó. There is heavy percussion in the laiko segment, which is uncustomary to traditional laiko.

Six acts competed on 2 March 2011 in the Greek National Final. The song was performed fifth in the final by Yiorkas and Stereo Mike. At the end of voting, "Watch My Dance" was revealed as the winner.

== Eurovision ==
Yiorkas and Stereo Mike performed in the 2011 Eurovision Song Contest in Düsseldorf, Germany, in the second half of the first semi-final of the contest on 10 May 2011. "Watch My Dance" won the first semi-final with a total of 133 points and competed in the final held on 14 May 2011, where he placed 7th with a total of 120 points.

== Track listing ==
- Digital download
1. "Watch My Dance" – 3:03

== Charts ==
Chart (2010)	Peak position
Greek Airplay chart (IFPI Greece)	52
Greek Digital Singles	1

== Release history ==
Region	Date	Label	Format
Greece	25 February 2011	Minos EMI	Airplay
Cyprus	25 February 2011	Minos EMI	Airplay
Greece	March 2010	Minos EMI	Digital download
Cyprus	March 2010	Minos EMI	Digital download
