= Hungary in the Eurovision Song Contest 2011 =

- Eurovision Song Contest 2011
- Country: Hungary
- Selection process: Internal selection
- Announcement date: 9 March 2011

Competing entry
- Song: "What About My Dreams?"
- Artist: Kati Wolf
- Songwriters: Viktor Rakonczai; Gergő Rácz; Johnny K. Palmer; Péter Geszti

Placement
- Semi-final result: Qualified (7th, 72 points)
- Final result: 22nd, 53 points

Participation chronology

Hungary was represented at the Eurovision Song Contest 2011 with the song "What About My Dreams?" written by Viktor Rakonczai, Gergő Rácz, Johnny K. Palmer and Péter Geszti. The song was performed by Kati Wolf. Songwriters Viktor Rakonczai and Gergő Rácz represented Hungary in the Eurovision Song Contest 1997 as part of the boy band V.I.P., placing twelfth in the competition with the song "Miért kell, hogy elmenj?". In December 2010, the Hungarian public broadcaster Magyar Televízió (MTV) announced that they would be returning to the Eurovision Song Contest after a one-year absence following their withdrawal in 2010 due to financial difficulties. The Hungarian entry for the 2011 contest in Düsseldorf, Germany was selected internally by MTV, and "What About My Dreams?" performed by Kati Wolf was announced as the Hungarian entry on 9 March 2011.

Hungary was drawn to compete in the first semi-final of the Eurovision Song Contest which took place on 10 May 2011. Performing during the show in position 15, "What About My Dreams? was announced among the top 10 entries of the first semi-final and therefore qualified to compete in the final on 14 May. It was later revealed that Hungary placed seventh out of the 18 participating countries in the semi-final with 72 points. In the final, Hungary performed in position 5 and placed twenty-second out of the 25 participating countries, scoring 53 points.

== Background ==
Prior to the 2011 contest, Hungary had participated in the Eurovision Song Contest eight times since their first entry in 1994. Hungary's best placing in the contest was fourth, which they achieved with their début entry in 1994 with the song "Kinek mondjam el vétkeimet?" performed by Friderika Bayer. Hungary had attempted participate in the contest in 1993, however, their entry was eliminated in the preselection show Kvalifikacija za Millstreet. Hungary withdrew from the contest for six years between 1999 and 2004 and also missed the 2006 and 2010 contests. In 2007, Hungary achieved their second best result in the contest since their début, placing ninth with the song "Unsubstantial Blues" performed by Magdi Rúzsa. In 2009, Hungary failed to qualify to the Eurovision final with the song "Dance with Me" performed by Zoli Ádok.

The Hungarian national broadcaster, Magyar Televízió (MTV), broadcasts the event within Hungary and organises the selection process for the nation's entry. Following a one-year absence, MTV confirmed their intentions to participate at the 2011 Eurovision Song Contest on 28 December 2010. MTV has organised both internal selections and national selection shows to select the nation's entries. The Hungarian broadcaster opted to select their entry internally in 2009, a process that was continued for 2011.

== Before Eurovision ==
=== Internal selection ===
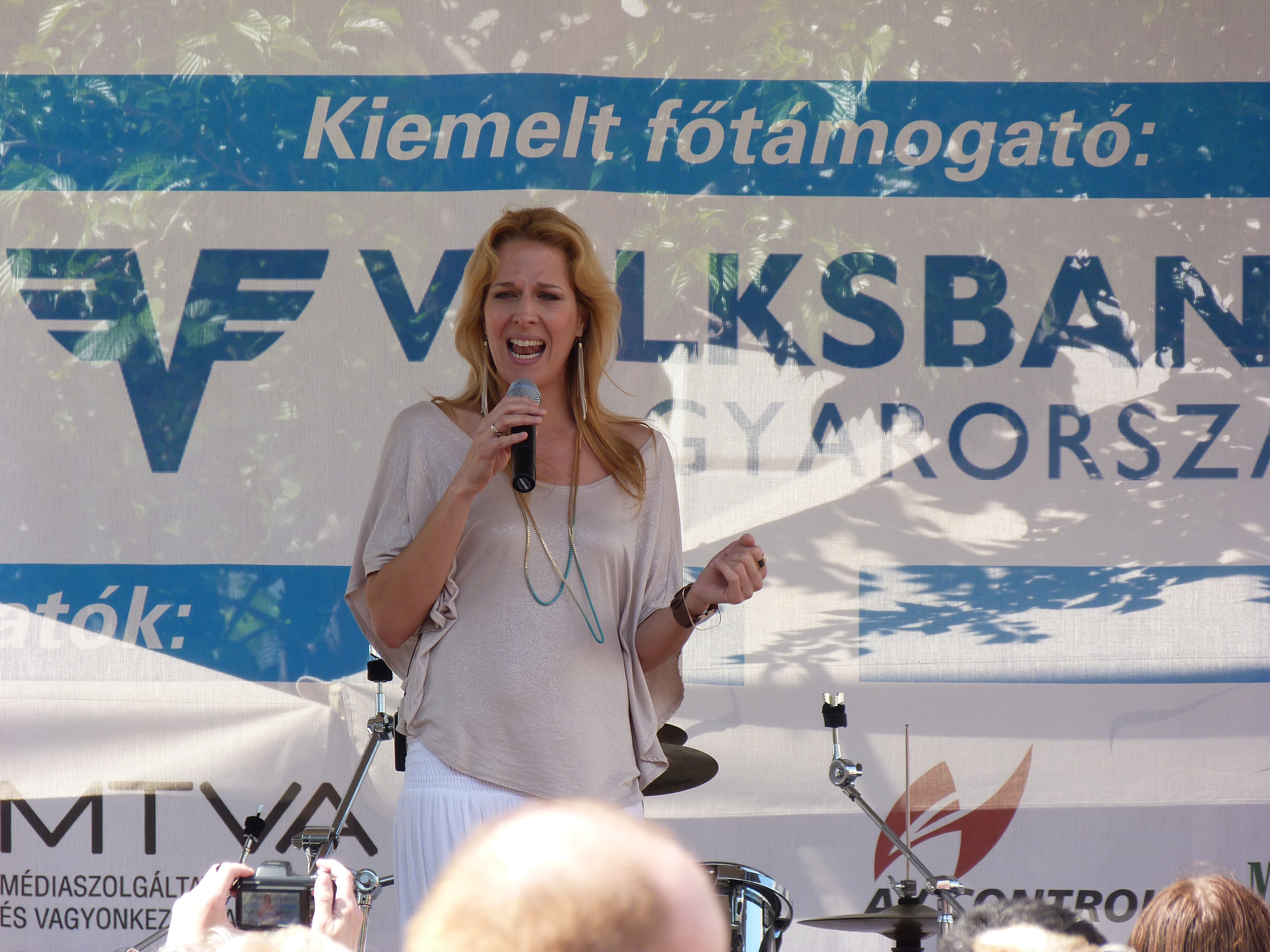
Kati Wolf was internally selected to represent Hungary in the Eurovision Song Contest 2011

On 7 March 2011, MTV announced that the Hungarian entry for the Eurovision Song Contest 2011 would be selected internally by a jury panel consisting of journalists as well as foreign and local Eurovision experts. On 9 March 2011, MTV announced during a press conference held at their headquarters in Budapest that Kati Wolf would represent Hungary in Düsseldorf with the song "What About My Dreams?". The presentation was also broadcast at the official Eurovision Song Contest website eurovision.tv. Wolf had previously participated in the first season of the reality singing competition X-Faktor where she placed sixth.

"What About My Dreams?" was written by Viktor Rakonczai, Gergő Rácz, Johnny K. Palmer and Péter Geszti, and was Kati Wolf's first single released earlier on 10 February 2011 in Hungarian as "Szerelem, miért múlsz". Rakonczai and Rácz had previously represented Hungary at the Eurovision Song Contest 1997 as members of the boy band V.I.P., placing twelfth with the song "Miért kell, hogy elmenj?". The song was shortened for the Eurovision Song Contest as the original version exceeded three minutes in length, and the final version was presented on 11 March 2011 through the release of the official music video, which was filmed in Budapest and directed by András Galler.

"What About My Dreams?" brings back the atmosphere of the disco music of the 80s, in which I grew up and which I love, but the modern arrangement makes it up-to-date. This song represents the way I am, it is just like me and it makes me very happy that the audience likes it too! I am sure that all the 100 million viewers from across Europe and Hungary will love it too.

— Kati Wolf about "What About My Dreams?"

== At Eurovision ==
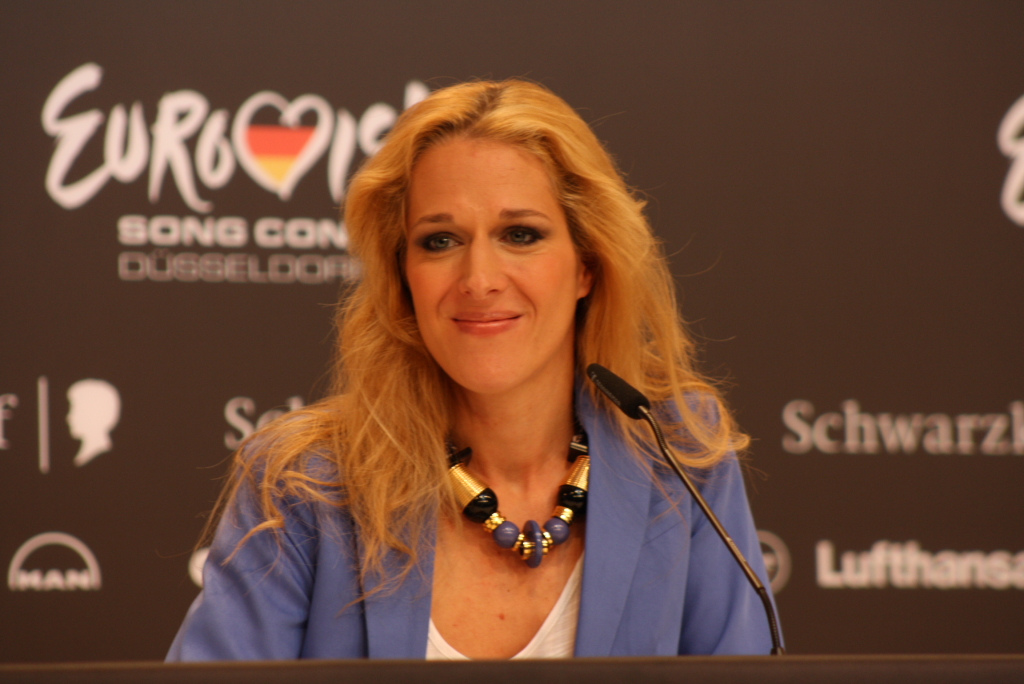
Kati Wolf during a press meet and greet

According to Eurovision rules, all nations with the exceptions of the host country and the "Big Five" (France, Germany, Italy, Spain and the United Kingdom) are required to qualify from one of two semi-finals in order to compete for the final; the top ten countries from each semi-final progress to the final. The European Broadcasting Union (EBU) split up the competing countries into six different pots based on voting patterns from previous contests, with countries with favourable voting histories put into the same pot. On 17 January 2011, an allocation draw was held which placed each country into one of the two semi-finals, as well as which half of the show they would perform in. Hungary was placed into the first semi-final, to be held on 10 May 2011, and was scheduled to perform in the second half of the show. The running order for the semi-finals was decided through another draw on 15 March 2011 and Hungary was set to perform in position 15, following the entry from Iceland and before the entry from Portugal.

The two semi-finals and the final were broadcast in Hungary on m1 with commentary by Gábor Gundel Takács. The Hungarian spokesperson, who announced Hungarian votes during the final, was Éva Novodomszky.

=== Semi-final ===
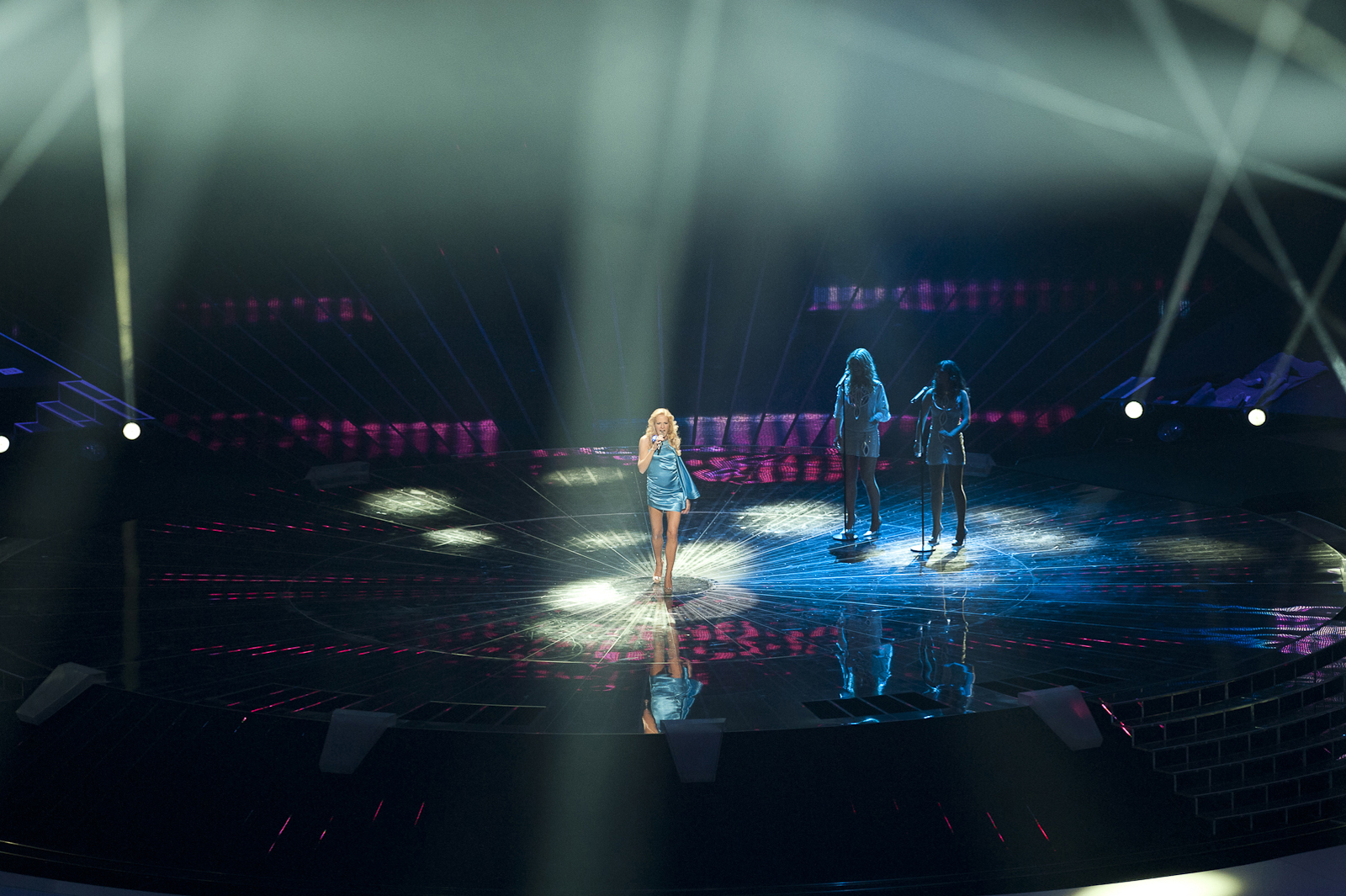
Kati Wolf performing during the first semi-final

Kati Wolf took part in technical rehearsals on 2 and 6 May, followed by dress rehearsals on 9 and 10 May. This included the jury show on 9 May where the professional juries of each country watched and voted on the competing entries.

The Hungarian performance featured Kati Wolf in a light blue dress with a shining brooch, designed by Napsugár von Bittera, with the stage displaying turning spotlights, predominantly blue lighting and the LED screens projecting blinking patterns. On stage, Wolf was joined by three dancers and two backing vocalists, all in white costumes with white LEDs attached. The three dancers that joined Kati Wolf were István Makár, Zsolt Ernő Kiss and Zsolt Szentirmai, while the two backing vocalists were Edit Jármai and Rita Ambrus.

At the end of the show, Hungary was announced as having finished in the top 10 and subsequently qualifying for the grand final. It was later revealed that Hungary placed seventh in the semi-final, receiving a total of 72 points.

=== Final ===
Shortly after the first semi-final, a winners' press conference was held for the ten qualifying countries. As part of this press conference, the qualifying artists took part in a draw to determine the running order for the final. This draw was done in the order the countries were announced during the semi-final. Hungary was drawn to perform in position 5, following the entry from Lithuania and before the entry from Ireland.

Kati Wolf once again took part in dress rehearsals on 13 and 14 May before the final, including the jury final where the professional juries cast their final votes before the live show. Kati Wolf performed a repeat of her semi-final performance during the final on 14 May. Hungary placed twenty-second in the final, scoring 53 points.

=== Voting ===
Voting during the three shows consisted of 50 percent public televoting and 50 percent from a jury deliberation. The jury consisted of five music industry professionals who were citizens of the country they represent. This jury was asked to judge each contestant based on: vocal capacity; the stage performance; the song's composition and originality; and the overall impression by the act. In addition, no member of a national jury could be related in any way to any of the competing acts in such a way that they cannot vote impartially and independently.

Following the release of the full split voting by the EBU after the conclusion of the competition, it was revealed that Lithuania had placed seventeenth with the public televote and twenty-first with the jury vote in the final. In the public vote, Hungary scored 64 points, while with the jury vote, Hungary scored 60 points. In the first semi-final, Hungary placed eighth with the public televote with 73 points and tenth with the jury vote, scoring 65 points.

Below is a breakdown of points awarded to Hungary and awarded by Hungary in the first semi-final and grand final of the contest. The nation awarded its 12 points to Iceland in the semi-final and the final of the contest.

==== Points awarded to Hungary ====
Points awarded to Hungary (Semi-final 1)
Score	Country
12 points	Finland
10 points	Serbia; Spain; United Kingdom
8 points	
7 points	Iceland
6 points	Croatia; Turkey
5 points	Greece; Norway
4 points	
3 points	
2 points	
1 point	Malta

Points awarded to Hungary (Final)
Score	Country
12 points	Finland
10 points	
8 points	Serbia
7 points	Romania
6 points	Spain
5 points	Iceland; Sweden
4 points	Ukraine
3 points	
2 points	Austria; Azerbaijan; France
1 point	

==== Points awarded by Hungary ====
Points awarded by Hungary (Semi-final 1)
Score	Country
12 points	Iceland
10 points	Greece
8 points	Switzerland
7 points	Azerbaijan
6 points	Finland
5 points	Lithuania
4 points	Poland
3 points	Russia
2 points	Malta
1 point	Georgia

Points awarded by Hungary (Final)
Score	Country
12 points	Iceland
10 points	Sweden
8 points	Greece
7 points	Azerbaijan
6 points	Slovenia
5 points	Georgia
4 points	Italy
3 points	Russia
2 points	Austria
1 point	Romania
