= Stereo Mike =

Greek rapper (born 1978)

Stereo Mike Μιχάλης Έξαρχος
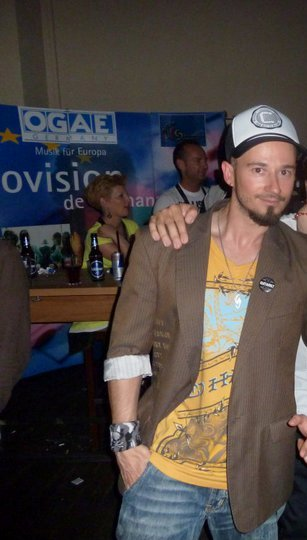
- Stereo Mike

Background information
- Also known as: Stereo Mike
- Born: Mihalis Exarchos; 4 July 1978 (age 48); Piraeus, Greece
- Genres: Hip hop, R&B
- Occupations: Singer, songwriter, producer, lecturer
- Instrument: Vocals
- Years active: 2003–present
- Labels: Mo' Money Recordings, Minos EMI

Michail Exarchos (Greek: Μιχάλης Έξαρχος) (born 4 July 1978 in Piraeus, Greece), known professionally by his stage name Stereo Mike, is a Greek hip hop artist. He is the first MTV EMA Award winner in the "Best Greek Act" category. Stereo Mike represented Greece in the Eurovision Song Contest 2011 alongside singer Loucas Yiorkas with the song "Watch My Dance", placing seventh with 120 points.

== Life and career ==
Exarchos was born in 1978 in Piraeus, Greece to a Greek father and Croatian mother from Rijeka. At the age of 18, his musical interest brought him to the UK for education in the field at the universities Leeds Metropolitan and University of Westminster. In the next four years, he obtained two degrees, Bachelor of Music Technology and Master on Sound Production. During his studies, Exarchos worked as a sound producer at Vault Recording Studios in Hackney, London, where he worked with several British hip hop artists, including Klashnekoff, Bury Crew, Skinnyman, Taskforce, Iceberg Slimm, Mike GLC and JMC.

Exarchos also worked as a producer at AMG Records, which led him to his first recording contract as 'Stereo Mike' with AMG's hip-hop sub-label, Mo' Money Recording$. Within two years, he composed and produced his debut album, while accepting a post-graduate lecturing position at London's University of Westminster in music production. He released his debut album in Greece titled Satirical Nomads by Mo' Money Recording$ under license to Universal Music Greece. The album's singles included the anti-racism anthem "O Allos Babis" and the remix "I Polis".

Stereo Mike was nominated at the Mad Video Music Awards in 2005 for "Best Hip-Hop Video Clip" and in 2008 for "Best Hip-Hop Video Clip" and for "Video Clip of the Year".

Stereo Mike subsequently signed to Minos EMI for his second album titled XLI3H, which is leet for the Greek word Εξέλιξη, meaning "evolution". He is concurrently doing research work toward a PhD in music.

Stereo Mike is the first MTV EMA Award winner in the "Best Greek Act" category, which came into effect with MTV's 2008 regional launch in Greece. He was also nominated for Greece in the category of Europe's Favourite Act for 2008.

Stereo Mike with Loucas Yiorkas represented Greece in the Eurovision Song Contest 2011 in Germany with the song "Watch My Dance".

== Albums ==
- 2004: Satirical Nomads
- 2007: XLI3H
- 2011: Aneli3h

== Singles ==
Satirical Nomads:

- 2004: "O Allos Babis"
- 2004: "I Polis"

2005 Mad Video Music Awards:

- 2005: "Pump It/Misirlou" (feat. Eleni Tsaligopoulou, Shaya & Lagnis NTP)

XLI3H:

- 2007: "Fevgo" (feat. Haris Alexiou)
- 2007: "Des Kathara (Face à la mer)" (feat. Andriana Babali)
- 2008: "Anagnorisi"
- 2008: "Alli Mia Nihta" (feat. Shaya)
- 2009: "Peraia Mou"

2008 Mad Video Music Awards:

- 2008: "S'opoion Aresei (Dansonra)" (feat. Tamta)
- 2008: "Piase Me" (feat. Eleni Tsaligopoulou)
- 2009: "Peraia Mou"

Eurovision Song Contest 2011

- 2011: "Watch My Dance" (credited to Loucas Yiorkas feat. Stereo Mike)
