= List of number-one albums of 2013 (Spain) =

Top 100 España is a record chart published weekly by PROMUSICAE (Productores de Música de España), a non-profit organization composed by Spain and multinational record companies. This association tracks record sales (physical and digital) in Spain.

== Albums ==
Week	Chart date	Album	Artist(s)	Ref(s)
1	January 6	Tanto	Pablo Alborán	
2	January 13	Tanto	Pablo Alborán	
3	January 20	Tanto	Pablo Alborán	
4	January 27	Tanto	Pablo Alborán	
5	February 3	Believe Acoustic	Justin Bieber	
6	February 10	Tanto	Pablo Alborán	
7	February 17	Tanto	Pablo Alborán	
8	February 24	Delantera Mítica	Quique González	
9	March 3	Cuatricomía	Fangoria	
10	March 10	Tanto	Pablo Alborán	
11	March 17	What About Now	Bon Jovi	
12	March 24	La Música es mi Mundo	Violetta OST	
13	March 31	Anti Heroes	Auryn	
14	April 7	La Música es mi Mundo	Violetta OST	
15	April 14	La Música es mi Mundo	Violetta OST	
16	April 21	Atletes, Baixin de l'Escenari	Manel	
17	April 28	Atletes, Baixin de l'Escenari	Manel	
18	May 5	Tanto	Pablo Alborán	
19	May 12	Tanto	Pablo Alborán	
20	May 19	Tanto	Pablo Alborán	
21	May 26	Random Access Memories	Daft Punk	
22	June 2	Tanto	Pablo Alborán	
23	June 9	Tanto	Pablo Alborán	
24	June 16	Tanto	Pablo Alborán	
25	June 23	Tanto	Pablo Alborán	
26	June 30	Tanto	Pablo Alborán	
27	July 7	Tanto	Pablo Alborán	
28	July 14	Tanto	Pablo Alborán	
29	July 21	Tanto	Pablo Alborán	
30	July 28	3.0	Marc Anthony	
31	August 4	3.0	Marc Anthony	
32	August 11	3.0	Marc Anthony	
33	August 18	3.0	Marc Anthony	
34	August 25	Tanto	Pablo Alborán	
35	September 1	Confidencias	Alejandro Fernández	
36	September 8	Confidencias	Alejandro Fernández	
37	September 15	Confidencias	Alejandro Fernández	
38	September 22	Dani Martín	Dani Martín	
39	September 29	Dani Martín	Dani Martín	
40	October 6	Dani Martín	Dani Martín	
41	October 13	Dani Martín	Dani Martín	
42	October 20	Sí	Malú	
43	October 27	Sí	Malú	
44	November 3	Confieso que he sentido	Manuel Carrasco	
45	November 10	Para Todos los Públicos	Extremoduro	
46	November 17	Cadore 33	Sergio Dalma	
47	November 24	Hoy somos más	Violetta OST	
48	December 1	Midnight Memories	One Direction	
49	December 8	Dos orillas	Antonio Orozco	
50	December 15	Hoy somos más	Violetta OST	
51	December 22	Hoy somos más	Violetta OST	
52	December 29	Hoy somos más	Violetta OST	
