= Spain in the Eurovision Song Contest 2011 =

- Eurovision Song Contest 2011
- Participating broadcaster: Radiotelevisión Española (RTVE)
- Country: Spain
- Selection process: Destino Eurovisión
- Selection date: 18 February 2011

Competing entry
- Song: "Que me quiten lo bailao"
- Artist: Lucía Pérez
- Songwriters: Rafael Artesero

Placement
- Final result: 23rd, 50 points

Participation chronology

Spain was represented at the Eurovision Song Contest 2011 with the song "Que me quiten lo bailao", written by Rafael Artesero, and performed by Lucía Pérez. The Spanish participating broadcaster, Radiotelevisión Española (RTVE), organised the national final Destino Eurovisión in order to select its entry for the contest. The national final consisted of two heats, a semi-final and a final and involved 24 competing acts. Three acts ultimately qualified to compete in the televised final where an in-studio jury and a public televote selected "Que me quiten lo bailao" performed by Lucía Pérez as the winner.

As a member of the "Big Five", Spain automatically qualified to compete in the final of the Eurovision Song Contest. Performing in position 22, Spain placed twenty-third out of the 25 participating countries with 50 points.

== Background ==
Prior to the 2011 contest, Televisión Española (TVE) until 2006, and Radiotelevisión Española (RTVE) since 2007, had participated in the Eurovision Song Contest representing Spain fifty times since TVE's first entry in 1961. They have won the contest on two occasions: in 1968 with the song "La, la, la" performed by Massiel and in 1969 with the song "Vivo cantando" performed by Salomé, the latter having won in a four-way tie with France, the Netherlands, and the United Kingdom. They have also finished second four times, with "En un mundo nuevo" by Karina in 1971, "Eres tú" by Mocedades in 1973, "Su canción" by Betty Missiego in 1979, and "Vuelve conmigo" by Anabel Conde in 1995. In 2010, RTVE placed fifteenth with the song "Algo pequeñito" performed by Daniel Diges.

As part of its duties as participating broadcaster, RTVE organises the selection of its entry in the Eurovision Song Contest and broadcasts the event in the country. RTVE confirmed its intentions to participate at the 2011 contest on 1 October 2010. Between 2007 and 2010, RTVE organised a national final to select both the artist and song that would represent Spain. The procedure was continued in order to select their 2011 entry.

== Before Eurovision ==
=== Destino Eurovisión ===
Destino Eurovisión was the national final organised by RTVE that took place from 28 January 2011 to 18 February 2011 at the TVE studios in Sant Cugat del Vallès (Barcelona), hosted by Anne Igartiburu with Daniel Diges, who represented Spain in 2010, acting as the green room host. All shows were broadcast on La 1, TVE Internacional, and online via RTVE's official website rtve.es.

==== Format ====
Destino Eurovisión consisted of 24 candidates competing over four shows: two heats on 28 January 2011 and 4 February 2011, a semi-final on 11 February 2011 and the final on 18 February 2011. Each heat featured twelve contestants performing cover versions of former Spanish Eurovision songs or winning Eurovision songs of their choice and five qualified for the semi-final. The semi-final featured the ten qualifiers from the heats performing cover versions of former Spanish Eurovision songs or winning Eurovision songs of their choice and three qualified for the final. In the final, each of the remaining three contestants performed three candidate Eurovision songs with the winner being decided upon over two rounds of voting. In the first round, one song per contestant qualified for a second round of voting, during which the winning entry was determined.

The results during all four shows were decided upon through public televoting and an in-studio expert jury. In each heat, the twelve contestants were divided into four groups of three and the jury first eliminated one contestant from each group. The remaining eight contestants then faced a public televote where the top three qualified and the jury selected an additional two contestants to advance to the semi-final. In the semi-final, the ten contestants first faced a public televote where the top two qualified. The jury then selected an additional contestant from the remaining eight acts to advance. In the final, the first round results were decided upon by the jury and the second round results were decided upon through public televoting.

==== Competing entries ====
Two separate submission periods were opened from 15 November 2010 until 12 December 2010 for artists and songwriters to submit their applications and songs. Artists were also able to apply by attending auditions that were held in Madrid and Barcelona on 25 and 29 November 2010, respectively. At the conclusion of the submission period, 1,142 songs and 627 artist applications were received. Professionals at RTVE selected 24 contestants for the national final from 30 shortlisted following a second audition in Barcelona on 15 December 2010, and nine songs from 20 shortlisted which were then allocated to the three finalists of Destino Eurovisión. The contestants were announced on 11 January 2011, while the allocation of the competing songs were announced on 12 February 2011 and previewed by RTVE on their official website later on 16 February. Among the competing artists was Dani Fernández (member of Auryn) who represented Spain in the Junior Eurovision Song Contest 2006.

Artists selection – 15 December 2010
- Alazán
- Alba Lucía
- Auryn
- Baltanás
- Da Igual
- Dani Alemán
- David Sancho
- Divas
- Don Johnsons
- Esmeralda Grao
- Fernando H.
- Gio
- Guadiana
- Las Miranda
- Lorena Rosales
- Lucía Pérez
- Lussi Bom
- María López
- Melissa
- Mónica Guech
- Pau Quero
- Paula Marengo
- Roima Durán
- Sebas
- Sergi Albert
- Sometimes
- Sonia and Selena
- Sunami
- Valeria Antonella
- We

Songs selection
Song	Songwriter(s)	Result
"Abrázame"	Tony Sánchez-Ohlsson; Thomas G:son	Qualified
"C'est la vie! It's Alright!"	W&M; Nestor Geli; Susie Päivärinta; Per Andersson; Mats Lindberg	Qualified
"Diamonds"	Nestor Geli; Susie Päivärinta; Pär Lönn	Qualified
"El sol brillará"	Rafael de Alba	Qualified
"Eos"	Jesús Cañadilla; Alejandro de Pinedo	Qualified
"Eres tan cool"	Jesús Cañadilla, Alejandro de Pinedo	—N/a
"Eres todo lo que quiero"	Mikel Herzog; Alberto Estébanez	—N/a
"Evangeline"	Kjell Jennstig; Dejan Belgrenius; Kristin Molin	Qualified
"Golden Cadillac"	Kjell Jennstig; Gerard James Borg; Leif Goldkuhl	—N/a
"Llueve"	Juan Guillénn	—N/a
"Música"	Vanessa Serrano	—N/a
"Only Break My Heart?"	Rafael Artesero	—N/a
"Peligroso"	William Luque; Domingo Sánchez	—N/a
"Que me quiten lo bailao"	Rafael Artesero	Qualified
"Sospechas"	Gustavo Castañeda	—N/a
"Sueño y sueñas"	Pedro Romeo; Amaya Martínez	—N/a
"Sueños rotos"	Primož Poglajen; Jonas Gladnikoff; Camilla Gottschalck; Christina Schilling	Qualified
"Teasing You"	Rafael Artesero	—N/a
"Tic, Tac"	Rocío Romero Grau	—N/a
"Volver"	Primož Poglajen; Jonas Gladnikoff; Camilla Gottschalck; Christina Schilling	Qualified

==== Heats ====
The two heats took place on 28 January and 4 February 2011. The five members of the in-studio jury that evaluated the contestants during the shows were Albert Hammond (singer-songwriter, music producer), Merche (singer-songwriter), Reyes del Amor (expert specializing in the Eurovision Song Contest), David Ascanio (singer-songwriter) and Boris Izaguirre (television presenter, screenwriter, journalist).

In addition to the performances of the competing entries, guest performers in the first semi-final included Soraya Arnelas, Pitingo and jury member Albert Hammond, while guest performers in the second semi-final included David Civera, Malú and jury member Merche.

Public vote qualifier Jury qualifier

Heat 1 (First Round) – 28 January 2011
Group	R/O	Artist	Song (Original artists)	Result
I	1	David Sancho	"Estando contigo" (Conchita Bautista)	Advanced
I	2	Roima Durán	"Wild Dances" (Ruslana)	—N/a
I	3	Da Igual	"Bailar pegados" (Sergio Dalma)	Advanced
II	4	Lucía Pérez	"Non ho l'età" (Gigliola Cinquetti)	Advanced
II	5	Auryn	"Fly on the Wings of Love" (Olsen Brothers)	Advanced
II	6	Las Miranda	"Ding-a-dong" (Teach-In)	—N/a
III	7	Sunami	"Gwendolyne" (Julio Iglesias)	—N/a
III	8	Gio	"Satellite" (Lena Meyer-Landrut)	Advanced
III	9	Guadiana	"Ne partez pas sans moi" (Céline Dion)	Advanced
IV	10	María López	"Vuelve conmigo" (Anabel Conde)	Advanced
IV	11	Baltanás	"Fairytale" (Alexander Rybak)	Advanced
IV	12	Paula Marengo	"Tu te reconnaîtras" (Anne-Marie David)	—N/a

Heat 1 (Second Round) – 28 January 2011
Artist	Song (Original artists)	Result
Auryn	"Fly on the Wings of Love" (Olsen Brothers)	Qualified
Baltanás	"Fairytale" (Alexander Rybak)	—N/a
Da Igual	"Bailar pegados" (Sergio Dalma)	Qualified
David Sancho	"Estando contigo" (Conchita Bautista)	Qualified
Gio	"Satellite" (Lena Meyer-Landrut)	Qualified
Guadiana	"Ne partez pas sans moi" (Céline Dion)	—N/a
Lucía Pérez	"Non ho l'età" (Gigliola Cinquetti)	Qualified
María López	"Vuelve conmigo" (Anabel Conde)	—N/a

Heat 2 (First Round) – 4 February 2011
Group	R/O	Artist	Song (Original artists)	Result
I	1	Pau Quero	"A-Ba-Ni-Bi" (Izhar Cohen and Alphabeta)	—N/a
I	2	Lorena Rosales	"My Number One" (Helena Paparizou)	Advanced
I	3	Don Johnson's	"Yo soy aquél" (Raphael)	Advanced
II	4	Sergi Albert	"Hold Me Now" (Johnny Logan)	Advanced
II	5	Mónica Guech	"Believe" (Dima Bilan)	Advanced
II	6	Alazán	"Bandido" (Azúcar Moreno)	—N/a
III	7	Sebas	"Molitva" (Marija Šerifović)	Advanced
III	8	Melissa	"Après toi" (Vicky Leandros)	Advanced
III	9	Sometimes	"Waterloo" (ABBA)	—N/a
IV	10	Valeria Antonella	"Save Your Kisses for Me" (Brotherhood of Man)	—N/a
IV	11	We	"Enséñame a cantar" (Micky)	Advanced
IV	12	Esmeralda Grao	"Nacida para amar" (Nina)	Advanced

Heat 2 (Second Round) – 4 February 2011
Artist	Song (Original artists)	Result
Don Johnson's	"Yo soy aquél" (Raphael)	Qualified
Esmeralda Grao	"Nacida para amar" (Nina)	Qualified
Lorena Rosales	"My Number One" (Helena Paparizou)	—N/a
Melissa	"Après toi" (Vicky Leandros)	Qualified
Mónica Guech	"Believe" (Dima Bilan)	Qualified
Sebas	"Molitva" (Marija Šerifović)	Qualified
Sergi Albert	"Hold Me Now" (Johnny Logan)	—N/a
We	"Enséñame a cantar" (Micky)	—N/a

==== Semi-final ====
The semi-final took place on 11 February 2011. The five members of the in-studio jury that evaluated the contestants during the show were Albert Hammond (singer-songwriter, music producer), Merche (singer-songwriter), Reyes del Amor (expert specializing in the Eurovision Song Contest), David Ascanio (singer-songwriter) and Boris Izaguirre (television presenter, screenwriter, journalist). In addition to the performances of the competing entries, guest performers included Sergio Dalma, Pastora Soler and jury member David Ascanio.

Public vote qualifier Jury qualifier

Semi-final – 11 February 2011
R/O	Artist	Song (Original artists)	Result
1	Da Igual	"Puppet on a String" (Sandie Shaw)	—N/a
2	Esmeralda Grao	"La fiesta terminó" (Paloma San Basilio)	—N/a
3	Sebas	"What's Another Year" (Johnny Logan)	—N/a
4	Lucía Pérez	"Boom Bang-a-Bang" (Lulu)	Qualified
5	Auryn	"Eres tú" (Mocedades)	Qualified
6	Melissa	"Diva" (Dana International)	Qualified
7	Gio	"Dime" (Beth)	—N/a
8	Mónica Guech	"Love Shine a Light" (Katrina and the Waves)	—N/a
9	Don Johnson's	"Hard Rock Hallelujah" (Lordi)	—N/a
10	David Sancho	"Volare" (Domenico Modugno)	—N/a

===== Final =====
The final took place on 18 February 2011. The winner was selected over two rounds of voting. In the first round, each finalist performed their three candidate Eurovision songs and the in-studio jury selected one to advance to the second round. In the vote to select Lucía Pérez's song, "Que me quiten lo bailao" and "Abrázame" were tied at 12 points each but since "Que me quiten lo bailao" received the most top marks from the jury the song advanced to the second round. The five members of the in-studio jury that evaluated the entries during the show were Albert Hammond (singer-songwriter, music producer), Sole Giménez (singer), Reyes del Amor (expert specializing in the Eurovision Song Contest), David Ascanio (singer-songwriter) and Boris Izaguirre (television presenter, screenwriter, journalist). In the second round, the winner, "Que me quiten lo bailao" performed by Lucía Pérez, was selected exclusively through a public televote.

In addition to the performances of the competing entries, guest performers included Blue, which would represent the United Kingdom in 2011, co-host Daniel Diges, and jury members Sole Giménez and Albert Hammond.

Final – 18 February 2011
R/O	Artist	Song	Points	Place	Result
1	Melissa	"Eos"	14	2	Advanced
2	Auryn	"Evangeline"	9	6	—N/a
3	Lucía Pérez	"Que me quiten lo bailao"	12	3	Advanced
4	Melissa	"Sueños rotos"	11	5	—N/a
5	Auryn	"El sol brillará"	6	7	—N/a
6	Lucía Pérez	"Abrázame"	12	4	—N/a
7	Melissa	"Diamonds"	5	9	—N/a
8	Auryn	"Volver"	15	1	Advanced
9	Lucía Pérez	"C'est la vie! It's Alright!"	6	7	—N/a

Detailed Jury Votes
R/O	Song	A. Hammond	S. Giménez	R. del Amor	D. Ascanio	B. Izaguirre	Total
1	"Eos"	3	2	3	3	3	14
2	"Evangeline"	2	2	2	2	1	9
3	"Que me quiten lo bailao"	2	3	1	3	3	12
4	"Sueños rotos"	2	3	2	2	2	11
5	"El sol brillará"	1	1	1	1	2	6
6	"Abrázame"	3	2	3	2	2	12
7	"Diamonds"	1	1	1	1	1	5
8	"Volver"	3	3	3	3	3	15
9	"C'est la vie! It's Alright!"	1	1	2	1	1	6

Second Round – 18 February 2011
R/O	Artist	Song	Televote	Place
1	Melissa	"Eos"	12%	3
2	Auryn	"Volver"	20%	2
3	Lucía Pérez	"Que me quiten lo bailao"	68%	1

== At Eurovision ==
According to Eurovision rules, all nations with the exceptions of the host country and the "Big Five" (France, Germany, Italy, Spain and the United Kingdom) are required to qualify from one of two semi-finals in order to compete for the final; the top ten countries from each semi-final progress to the final. As a member of the "Big 5", Spain automatically qualified to compete in the final on 14 May 2011. In addition to their participation in the final, Spain is also required to broadcast and vote in one of the two semi-finals. During the semi-final allocation draw on 17 January 2011, Spain was assigned to broadcast and vote in the first semi-final on 10 May 2011.

In Spain, the semi-finals were broadcast on La 2 and the final was broadcast on La 1, TVE HD, and TVE Internacional with commentary by José Luis Uribarri. RTVE appointed Elena S. Sánchez as its spokesperson to announce during the final the Spanish votes. The broadcast of the final was watched by 4.724 million viewers in Spain with a market share of 32.3%. This represented a decrease of 9.6% from the previous year with 1.036 million less viewers.

=== Final ===
Lucía Pérez took part in technical rehearsal on 7 and 8 May, followed by dress rehearsals on 13 and 14 May. This included the jury final on 13 May where the professional juries of each country, responsible for 50 percent of each country's vote, watched and voted on the competing entries. The running order for the semi-finals and final was decided by through another draw on 15 March 2011, and as one of the five wildcard countries, Spain chose to perform in position 22, following the entry from Iceland and before the entry from Ukraine.

The Spanish performance featured Lucía Pérez performing a choreographed dance routine on stage wearing a short pink dress with black inlays together with two backing vocalists and three dancers all dressed in white, with the outfits of the dancers equipped with LEDs that light up. The LED screens displayed dark red, yellow and blue flowers and a firework display effect. The performance also featured pyrotechnic effects. The choreographer for the performance was Lola González. The five backing performers that joined Lucía Pérez were Cristina Domínguez, Sandra Borrego, Amaury Reinoso, Juan Francisco Solsona "Nito" and Ginés Cano. Spain placed twenty-third in the final, scoring 50 points.

=== Voting ===
Voting during the three shows consisted of 50 percent public televoting and 50 percent from a jury deliberation. The jury consisted of five music industry professionals who were citizens of the country they represent. This jury was asked to judge each contestant based on: vocal capacity; the stage performance; the song's composition and originality; and the overall impression by the act. In addition, no member of a national jury could be related in any way to any of the competing acts in such a way that they cannot vote impartially and independently.

Following the release of the full split voting by the EBU after the conclusion of the competition, it was revealed that Spain had placed sixteenth with the public televote and twenty-fourth with the jury vote. In the public vote, Spain scored 73 points and in the jury vote the nation scored 38 points.

Below is a breakdown of points awarded to Spain and awarded by Spain in the first semi-final and grand final of the contest, and the breakdown of the jury voting and televoting conducted during the two shows:

==== Points awarded to Spain ====
Points awarded to Spain (Final)
Score	Country
12 points	France; Portugal
10 points	
8 points	
7 points	
6 points	
5 points	Albania; Romania
4 points	Estonia; Macedonia
3 points	Switzerland
2 points	Slovakia; Slovenia
1 point	United Kingdom

==== Points awarded by Spain ====
Points awarded by Spain (Semi-final 1)
Score	Country
12 points	Iceland
10 points	Hungary
8 points	Portugal
7 points	Greece
6 points	Switzerland
5 points	Lithuania
4 points	Finland
3 points	Armenia
2 points	Serbia
1 point	Azerbaijan

Points awarded by Spain (Final)
Score	Country
12 points	Italy
10 points	France
8 points	Romania
7 points	Ireland
6 points	Hungary
5 points	Sweden
4 points	Serbia
3 points	Germany
2 points	Iceland
1 point	Lithuania
