= Endless Road (disambiguation) =

Endless Road is an album by Tommy Emmanuel.

Endless Road may also refer to:

- The Endless Road, a 1943 German film
- Endless Road, 7058, an album by Auryn
- Endless Road, a 1985 song by the Dutch band Time Bandits
