= Il mondo (song) =

Single by Jimmy Fontana
- B-side: "Allora sì"
- Released: April 1965
- Genre: Pop
- Label: RCA
- Songwriters: Carlo Pes; Lilli Greco; Gianni Meccia; Jimmy Fontana

Jimmy Fontana singles chronology
"E quanto tempo durerà" (1964)	"Il mondo" (1965)	"Pensiamoci ogni sera" (1966)

Audio
- "Il Mondo" on YouTube

"Il mondo" ('The World') is a song composed by Carlo Pes, Lilli Greco, Gianni Meccia and Jimmy Fontana, and performed by Jimmy Fontana. Arrangements were from Ennio Morricone. The song premiered at the 1965 edition of Un disco per l'estate.

The single peaked at first place for four weeks between July and October 1965 on the Italian hit parade. It was the most successful song of Fontana.

The song was adapted in English by Robert Mellin with the title "My World", and recorded by The Ray Charles Singers, The Bachelors and Engelbert Humperdinck. A French version titled "Un monde fait pour nous" was recorded by Hervé Vilard and by Richard Anthony. Fontana himself took a Spanish version, titled "El Mundo", to the top of the Spanish charts in 1965. The Spanish version was also covered by popular Cuban singer Roberto Faz and Mexican singer Javier Solis.

The song was later covered by several artists including Gianni Morandi, Milva, Il Volo, Patrizio Buanne, Ornella Vanoni, Claudio Baglioni, Gianna Nannini, Franco Simone, Cristiano Nichelle, Karel Gott, Dyango, Al Bano, Punkreas and Piotta. A cover of "Il mondo" was performed by Joan Thiele at the 2026 Winter Olympics closing ceremony.

In 2011, Sergio Dalma included a version of the song on Via Dalma II, his second collection of Italian songs performed in Spanish. Issued as the first single from the disc, "El Mundo" rose to No. 10 on the official chart released by Productores de Música de España. The song also achieved success in Latin America, particularly Argentina, thanks to its inclusion in the soap opera (telenovela) Dulce Amor.

"Il mondo" was also used in several films, including Richard Curtis' About Time and Philippe Le Guay's Bicycling with Molière and the opening title sequence of the Italian television miniseries Il miracolo by Niccolò Ammaniti.

== Track listing ==
- 7" single – PM45-3316
1. "Il mondo" (Meccia – Fontana – Pes – Greco) – 2:37
2. "Allora sì" (Fontana – Pes) – 2:37

== Charts ==
Chart (1965–66)	Peak position
Austria	9
Brazil (IBOPE)	3
Italy (Musica e dischi)	1
Spain (AFYVE)	1
