= Cruzo los dedos =

Studio album by Lucía Pérez
- Released: 12 April 2011
- Recorded: 2010–2011
- Genre: Pop
- Label: Warner Music Spain

Lucía Pérez chronology
Dígocho en galego (2010)	Cruzo los dedos (2011)	Quitapenas (2014)

Singles from Cruzo los dedos
- 1. "Que me quiten lo bailao" Released: March 25, 2011

Cruzo los dedos (I cross my fingers) is the fifth album from Spanish singer-songwriter Lucía Pérez, it was released on April 12, 2011. The first single released from the album "Que me quiten lo bailao" was released on 25 March 2011.

== Singles ==
- "Que me quiten lo bailao" was the first single released from the album, Lucía Pérez sang the song at the Eurovision Song Contest 2011 for Spain in the final. Pérez scored 50 points and finished 23rd.

== Track listing ==
No.	Title	Length
1.	"Qué me quiten lo bailao"	2:55
2.	"A ver si aprendo"	3:36
3.	"Abrázame"	3:15
4.	"No sabré darte las gracias"	3:50
5.	"Quién te crees que eres"	4:17
6.	"Este amor es tuyo"	3:53
7.	"Tu silencio"	4:05
8.	"Cruzo los dedos"	3:14
9.	"La página 10"	4:03
10.	"Perdida en tu equipaje"	3:55
11.	"Probablemente"	3:40
12.	"Adiós ríos, adiós fontes"	2:43

== Charts ==
Chart (2011)	Peak position
Spanish Albums Chart	31

== Release history ==
Country	Date	Format	Label
Spain	12 April 2011	Digital download	Warner Music Spain
