= List of number-one albums of 2014 (Spain) =

Top 100 España is a record chart published weekly by PROMUSICAE (Productores de Música de España), a non-profit organization composed by Spain and multinational record companies. This association tracks record sales (physical and digital) in Spain.

== Albums ==
Week	Chart date	Album	Artist(s)	Ref(s)
1	January 5	Hoy somos más	Violetta OST	
2	January 12	Hoy somos más	Violetta OST	
3	January 19	High Hopes	Bruce Springsteen	
4	January 26	High Hopes	Bruce Springsteen	
5	February 2	Pólvora	Leiva	
6	February 9	Pólvora	Leiva	
7	February 16	Sí	Malú	
8	February 23	Esto Es Estopa	Estopa	
9	March 1	Los Viajes Ínmoviles	Nach	
10	March 8	Los Sueños Cumplidos	David Barrull	
11	March 15	Los Sueños Cumplidos	David Barrull	
12	March 23	Tú y Yo	David Bisbal	
13	March 30	Tú y Yo	David Bisbal	
14	April 6	Tú y Yo	David Bisbal	
15	April 13	La Deriva	Vetusta Morla	
16	April 20	Tú y Yo	David Bisbal	
17	April 27	Tú y Yo	David Bisbal	
18	May 4	Canción Andaluza	Paco de Lucía	
19	May 11	4.0	Mónica Naranjo	
20	May 18	Xscape	Michael Jackson	
21	May 25	Ghost Stories	Coldplay	
22	June 1	Ghost Stories	Coldplay	
23	June 8	Xscape	Michael Jackson	
24	June 15	Xscape	Michael Jackson	
25	June 22	Tú y Yo	David Bisbal	
26	June 29	Más de lo Que Piensas	Camela	
27	July 6	5 Seconds of Summer	5 Seconds of Summer	
28	July 13	5 Seconds of Summer	5 Seconds of Summer	
29	July 20	Tú y Yo	David Bisbal	
30	July 28	Lo mejor está por venir	Gemeliers	
31	August 3	Lo mejor está por venir	Gemeliers	
32	August 10	Lo mejor está por venir	Gemeliers	
33	August 17	Lo mejor está por venir	Gemeliers	
34	August 24	Sex and Love	Enrique Iglesias	
35	August 31	En Todo Estaré	Chayanne	
36	September 7	Crónica de un baile	Vanesa Martín	
37	September 14	Crónica de un baile	Vanesa Martín	
38	September 21	Si Dios quiere, yo también	Amaia Montero	
39	September 28	Vivir	Bustamante	
40	October 5	Circus Avenue	Auryn	
41	October 12	La Llamada	Ismael Serrano	
42	October 19	Songs of Innocence	U2	
43	October 26	Hijo del Levante	El Barrio	
44	November 2	Huyendo conmigo de mí	Fito & Fitipaldis	
45	November 9	Huyendo conmigo de mí	Fito & Fitipaldis	
46	November 16	Terral	Pablo Alborán	
47	November 23	Terral	Pablo Alborán	
48	November 30	Un alumno más	Melendi	
49	December 7	Terral	Pablo Alborán	
50	December 14	Terral	Pablo Alborán	
51	December 21	Terral	Pablo Alborán	
52	December 28	Terral	Pablo Alborán	
