= Mark Roberts (streaker) =

English streaker

- Roberts streaking at the 1994 Hong Kong Sevens rugby tournament
- Born: December 12, 1964 (age 61); Liverpool, England, United Kingdom
- Years active: 1993–present
- Known for: Streaking

Mark Roberts (born 12 December 1964) is an English streaker who has run naked during numerous international events. Roberts's streaking began when he saw a news report about a female streaker at a 1993 rugby sevens game in Hong Kong. After a bet in a bar, he exposed himself to the crowd the next day.

Roberts has done this, as of 2024, 583 times in 23 countries, targeting such events as those held at Hamilton Park Racecourse, a Mr. Universe contest, a Miss World contest, multiple Olympic Games, tennis matches, the Running of the Bulls, the synchronized swimming world championship, and his specialty, association football matches. According to Roberts, he was mandated to surrender his passport whenever an English football team played abroad following a 2001 conviction for streaking (including FA Cup Final 2001). It is unclear how long this mandate was in place.

== Streaking incidents ==
One famous streak was on a live 1995 broadcast of This Morning, where he swam onto Fred Talbot's floating weather map and proceeded to emulate Talbot's trademark leap from Scotland to Ireland.

In January 2003, Roberts flew to San Diego, California, where he planned to streak at Super Bowl XXXVII. He was unable to get tickets to the game, but succeeded the next year at Super Bowl XXXVIII in Houston, Texas. Just before the start of the second half, he ran onto the field disguised as a referee, stripped, and performed a dance wearing only a thong. He was taken into custody after being tackled by members of the Carolina Panthers and New England Patriots. He was issued a $1,000 fine for trespassing.

On 21 May 2003, in the 2003 UEFA Cup Final at the Estadio Olímpico de Sevilla, Spain, before the start of the match between Celtic FC and FC Porto, he ran onto the center of the field disguised as a referee, presented the referee with a red card, then completely undressed, revealing the words "GoldenPalaceCasino.com Click here" on his back (as part of an advertising deal). While in this state for a few seconds, he picked up the ball and made a slalom pass to the gate, protected by Vítor Baía. Roberts struck at him, but the goalkeeper deflected the blow. Afterwards, Roberts was detained by security. A year earlier, he managed to score a goal against Hans-Jörg Butt in the 2002 UEFA Champions League Final, and also did a somersault through the net in the final of the men's singles tennis tournament Wimbledon. In 2000, he "participated" in one of Anna Kournikova's matches, also at Wimbledon (women's singles 2000).

Roberts planned to retire after streaking at the 2006 World Cup final at Berlin's Olympiastadion, but was stopped before entering the stadium. In 2007, Roberts ran out on the field at Wembley Stadium during the National Football League's first regular season game outside of North America between the Miami Dolphins and New York Giants. The next year, Roberts struck again during the final of the 2008 World Snooker Championship at the Crucible Theatre in Sheffield, England, just as he did at the Championship four years earlier.

In March 2010 Roberts was seen sporting a cat-shaped mask over his genitals at Crufts.

In 2018, Roberts made his first appearance since 2013 at the Gangneung Oval during the speed skating events of the 2018 Winter Olympics in Pyeongchang, South Korea. As the men's 1,000-meter speed skating medal ceremony concluded, Roberts took to the ice wearing nothing but a pink tutu and skimpy underwear with the words "peace and love" emblazoned across his bare chest.

== Commercial work and popular culture ==
A 2002 advertisement created by the Spanish ad agency Dimension for Spanish football club Athletic Bilbao featured Mark Roberts streaking fully clothed during a nude football game. It won a bronze award at the 2003 Cannes Film Festival. He was featured in the 2011 Banksy-produced documentary, The Antics Roadshow. In 2013, he was the subject of the Channel 4 documentary Streak! The Man Who Can't Keep His Clothes On. In the programme, he announced his forthcoming retirement, but not before one last streak. In 2011, artist Benedikt Dichgans hired Roberts to streak at the Turner Prize awarding ceremony at Tate Britain, but he was tackled by police while only partially on stage, and was arrested.

== See also ==
- Public nudity
- Streaking
- Jimmy Jump
