= Daniel Diges =

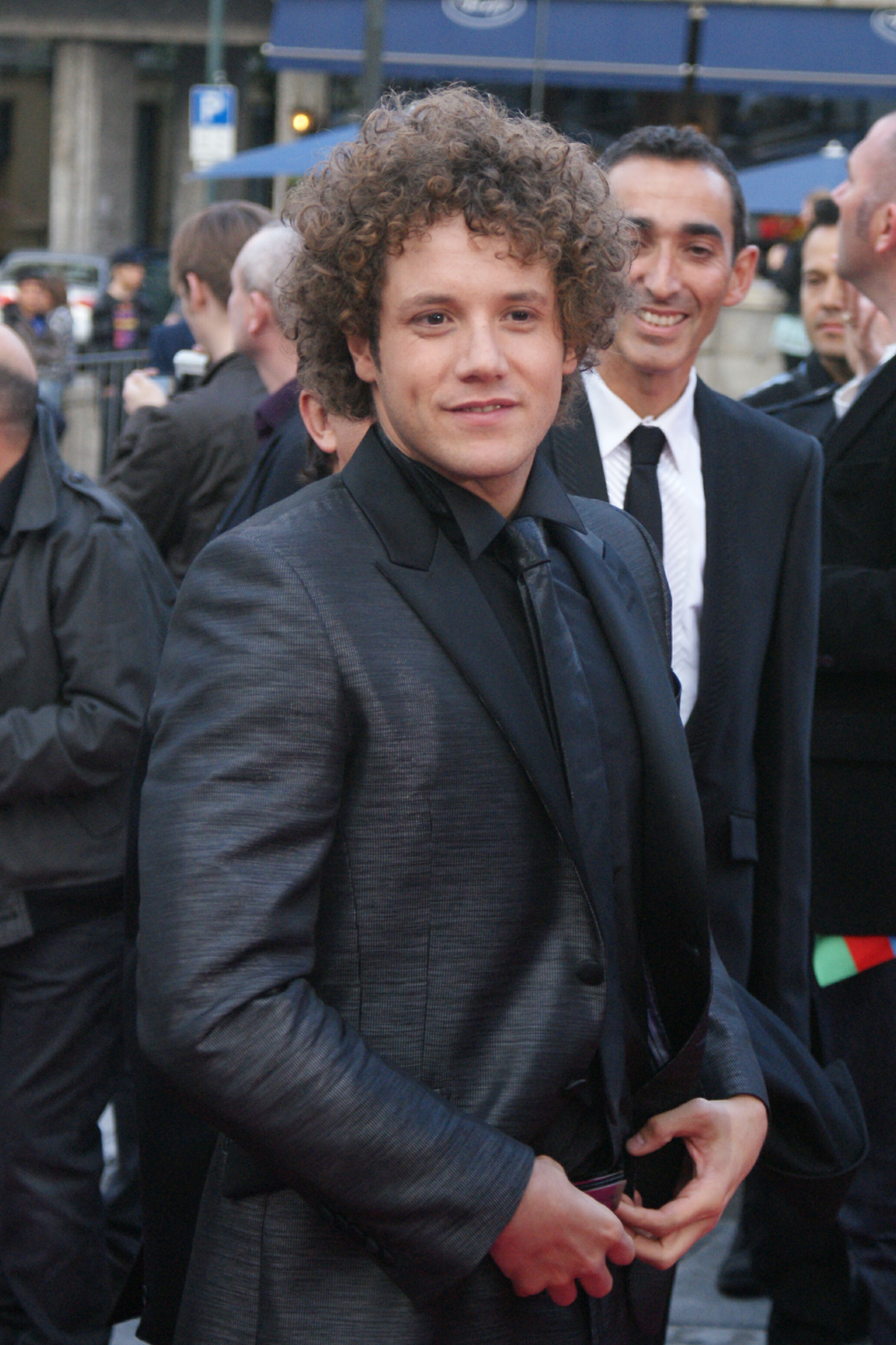
- Diges during a press conference

Background information
- Born: Daniel Diges García; 17 January 1981 (age 45)
- Origin: Alcalá de Henares (Madrid), Spain
- Genres: Vocal, musical theatre, adult contemporary, pop, traditional pop
- Occupations: Singer, Actor
- Instrument: Vocals
- Labels: Warner Music (2010-2015); Universal Music (2015-)

Daniel Diges García (Spanish pronunciation: [daˈnjel ˈdixes]; born 17 January 1981) is a Spanish singer, pianist, composer and actor. Although born in Madrid proper, he has spent all his youth in the neighbouring city of Alcalá de Henares.

== Life and career ==
Diges began his acting career in a theatre company, Teatro Escuela Libre de Alcalá de Henares (TELA), in his native city, and after starring in several TV adverts, he rose to fame in the teen drama television series Nada es para siempre (1999–2000), playing the character of "Gato". Over the years he has also hosted children shows like "Megatrix" (2001–2002) and Max Clan (2003–2004) and has appeared in several TV series playing secondary roles: Hospital Central (2002), Ana y los siete (2003), Aquí no hay quien viva (2005) and Agitación +IVA (2005–2006).

=== 2005-2010: Career in musical theatre ===
He debuted in big productions of musical theatre in 2005, playing the roles of Colate in En Tu Fiesta Me Colé and Mario in Hoy No Me Puedo Levantar. In 2007 and 2008 he played the role of Galileo in the Spanish production of We Will Rock You, and he also starred in the Spanish stage adaptation of High School Musical as Troy Bolton (2008–2009). In 2009 and early 2010, he played the role of Sky in the Spanish production of Mamma Mia!.

=== 2010: Eurovision and first album ===
On 22 February 2010, Diges won the Spanish national final, Eurovisión: Destino Oslo and was chosen to represent Spain in the Eurovision Song Contest 2010 with the song "Algo pequeñito", composed by Jesús Cañadilla and arranged and produced by Alejandro de Pinedo.

In March 2010, following his election as the Spanish Eurovision entrant, Diges was signed to Warner Music with the idea of recording an album in the style of a Spanish crooner. The album, self-titled Daniel Diges and produced by Óscar Gómez, was released on 18 May 2010. It includes mostly songs written by Diges himself, but also two versions of "Algo pequeñito" and Spanish versions of "Just the Way You Are" (Billy Joel), "Everything" (Michael Bublé) and "Angels" (Robbie Williams).

On 29 May 2010 in Oslo, Norway, during his scheduled performance in the Eurovision final, his routine was interrupted by famous stage invader Jimmy Jump, so according to the rules he was given the chance to perform again after all the other countries had performed. Diges finished on 15th position out of 25 entries.

=== 2010-2012: Los Miserables and Póker de Voces ===
After Eurovision, he was signed to play the role of revolutionary leader Enjolras in the Spanish production of 25th anniversary edition of Les Misérables, that was staged at Teatro Lope de Vega in Madrid (season 2010–2011) and at Barcelona Teatre Musical in Barcelona (season 2011–2012)". In 2011, together with fellow male cast members of Los Miserables David Ordinas, Gerónimo Rauch and Ignasi Vidal, he created, produced and starred in the concert show Póker de Voces. On 18 July 2011 Gerónimo Rauch was replaced by Pablo Puyol and on 3 June 2012 Ignasi Vidal was replaced by Paco Arrojo. The last concert of Póker de Voces was held in Xàtiva on 21 July 2012.

=== 2012-2013: Second album, La Bella y la Bestia, and Tu cara me suena ===
His second studio album, released on 31 January 2012, was titled ¿Dónde estabas tú en los 70? and consists of covers of famous hits from the 1970s like "Eres tú".

Diges played the role of Gaston in the national tour of La Bella y la Bestia (Beauty and the Beast) which opened in September 2012 in Valladolid to visit 17 Spanish cities.

On 27 August 2012, Diges was announced to join the cast of the second season of television show Tu cara me suena on Antena 3, in which celebrity contestants impersonate a different famous singer on stage in each episode. In the season finale that took place on 11 February 2013, he finished as the runner-up.

=== 2013-2015: Hoy No Me Puedo Levantar, Quiero and Los Miserables national tour ===
On 11 June 2013, Diges was announced to play the lead role (Mario) in the Madrid revival of Hoy No Me Puedo Levantar, which opened on 12 September 2013 at the Teatro Coliseum.

On 29 April 2014, Diges released his third studio album, titled Quiero. Its promotional single was "Te llevas mi amor".

In September 2014, Diges was announced to join Los Miserables again, on national tour, this time to lead as Jean Valjean. In January 2015, Diges re-united with David Ordinas, Ignasi Vidal and Pablo Puyol for Póker de Voces's new concert show.

On 5 May 2015, Diges released the single "Te veo", composed by Ruth Lorenzo and Jacobo Calderón.

=== 2015-2019: Calle Broadway, Les Misérables Brasil and Les Misérables Mexico ===
On 27 November 2015, Diges released his fourth studio album, his first with Universal Music, titled Calle Broadway. It consists of versions of famous songs from Broadway musicals. The album was followed by a same-titled tour of concert-shows across the Spanish geography.

Beginning in March 2017, Diges led as Jean Valjean in the Brazilian production of Les Misérables at the Teatro Renault in São Paulo. On 29 November 2017, it was announced Diges would also lead as Valjean in the 2018 Mexican revival of Les Misérables at the Teatro Telcel in Mexico City. Diges was part of the Mexican production until March 2019.

=== 2019-present: El Médico and Kinky Boots ===
Beginning in September 2019, Diges led as Rob J. Cole in the Madrid musical El Médico, at the Teatro Nuevo Apolo.

In October 2021, the Madrid production of Kinky Boots opened at the Espacio Delicias with Diges as Charlie Price.

== Discography ==
=== Albums ===
Year	Title	Chart positions
Year	Title	SPA
2010	Daniel Diges: 1st studio album; Released: 18 May 2010; Label: Warner Music Spain	6
2012	¿Dónde estabas tú en los 70?: 2nd studio album; Released: 31 January 2012; Label: Warner Music Spain	13
2014	Quiero: 3rd studio album; Released: 29 April 2014; Label: Warner Music Spain	13
2015	Calle Broadway: 4th studio album; Released: 27 November 2015; Label: Universal Music Spain	45

=== Singles ===
Year	Single	Chart Positions	Album
Year	Single	SPA	Album
2010	"Algo pequeñito"	5	Daniel Diges
2010	"Quédate Conmigo"	—	Daniel Diges
2010	"Momentos de Navidad"	—	Non-album single
2012	"Help! (Ayúdame)"	—	¿Dónde estabas tú en los 70?
2013	"Hoy tengo ganas de ti"	—	¿Dónde estabas tú en los 70?
2014	"Te llevas mi amor"	—	Quiero
2015	"Te veo"	—	Non-album single
2015	"Va todo al ganador"	—	Calle Broadway

== Awards ==
- Premio del Teatro Musical (Musical Theatre Award) for Best Breakthrough Actor for Hoy No Me Puedo Levantar (2007)
- Premio Nacional de Teatro (National Theatre Award) for Best Actor in Musicals (2010)
- Nominated – Premio de la Música (Spanish Music Award) for Best Breakthrough Songwriter for "Algo pequeñito" (shared with Alberto Jódar Collado, Jesús Cañadilla Gómez and Luis Miguel de la Varga Velasco) (2011)
- Nominated — Premio Dama de la Victoria for Best Lead Actor in a Musical for Los Miserables (Mexican production) (2019)

Preceded by Soraya with La noche es para mí	Spain in the Eurovision Song Contest; 2010	Succeeded by Lucía Pérez with Que me quiten lo bailao
