= Via Dalma II =

Studio album by Sergio Dalma
- Released: Nov 10, 2011
- Genre: Latin pop Pop
- Label: Warner Music
- Producer: Claudio Guidetti

Sergio Dalma chronology
Via Dalma (2010)	Via Dalma II (2011)	Cadore 33 (2013)

A sequel to the six-times platinum Via Dalma, Sergio Dalma's Via Dalma II reunited the pop singer with producer Claudio Guidetti and continued with the same format: Spanish-language versions of popular Italian songs. The disc was almost as successful as its predecessor, spending five weeks at No. 1 on the official chart released by Productores de Música de España and achieving quadruple platinum status after spending 49 weeks on the chart.

Four singles were released from the album. The first one, the ballad "El Mundo", reached No. 10 in Spain. The song also achieved success in Latin America, particularly Argentina, thanks to its inclusion in the telenovela Dulce Amor. A second single, "Te Amo," also reached No. 10 in Spain. The iTunes edition of the single featured a duet version with Argentine-Spanish singer Chenoa. Subsequent singles were "Yo No Te Pido La Luna" (No. 17 in Spain) and "La Cosa Más Bella" (No. 40 in Spain). The latter, a cover of the Eros Ramazzotti composition, was promoted with a video and iTunes single featuring a duet with Leire Martínez from La Oreja de Van Gogh. The duet version was not included on the album.

Via Dalma II was nominated for Best Traditional Pop Album at the 2012 Latin Grammys. The disc lost the award to Una Noche en el Teatro Real by David Bisbal. Dalma performed on the Nov 15 broadcast from Las Vegas, singing "Yo No Te Pido La Luna" as a duet with Mexican singer Daniela Romo, who had a hit with the song in 1984.

Dalma promoted the album in Spain with an RTVE special called Via Dalma that aired in December 2011. His guests included Laura Pausini, Nek, Pablo Alboran, Umberto Tozzi, Chenoa and Pastora Soler.

Released simultaneously with the album was a deluxe edition that came in a long box and featured two bracelets and a 2012 calendar.

== Track listing ==
1. "Senza Una Donna"
2. "El Mundo"
3. "La Cosa Más Bella"
4. "Te Amo"
5. "Yo No Te Pido La Luna"
6. "La Fuerza De La Vida"
7. "La Bambola"
8. "Gloria"
9. "Te Enamorarás"
10. "Poco A Poco Me Enamoré De Tí"
11. "Margarita"
12. "Tornero"
13. "Senza Una Donna (Catalán)"

== Charts ==
=== Weekly charts ===
Weekly chart performance for Via Dalma II
Chart (2011)	Peak position
Spanish Albums (PROMUSICAE)	1

=== Year-end charts ===
Year-end chart performance for Via Dalma II
Chart (2011)	Position
Spanish Albums (PROMUSICAE)	4
Chart (2012)	Position
Spanish Albums (PROMUSICAE)	6

== Certifications ==
Region	Certification	Certified units/sales
Spain (PROMUSICAE)	4× Platinum	160,000^{^}
^{^} Shipments figures based on certification alone.
