= Princess Hijab =

French street artist

- A sample from Princess Hijab's Dolche series
- Born: 1988 (age 36–37)
- Notable work: Diam’s Ma France à Moi
- Style: Subvertising
- Movement: Street art

Princess Hijab (born 1988) is an anonymous female street artist working primarily in Paris, France. Her art centres on veiling the main characters of metro advertisements using black paint.

== Work ==
Guerrilla art is innocent and criminal,
ancient and dystopian, intimate and
political. I chose the veil because it
does what art should do: It challenges,
it frightens, and it re-imagines
- Princess Hijab

Princess Hijab is recognized as the founder of "hijabism", a movement based on the "hijabizing" or "hijabization" of advertising images; effectively the painting of veils or hijabs over images of models to make it seem like the model is wearing a veil. As such, she is recognized for her images of veiled girls, boys and courting couples on advertising posters.

One of her works, Diam’s Ma France à Moi, is the portrait of the famous French rapper Diam's, covered with a veil using a black marker pen.

Other works by Princess Hijab include the Lafayette series, depicting a model promoting the French department store Galeries Lafayette, wearing a blue, white and red striped top and a black mask over her mouth, and the Dolche series, a series of Dolce & Gabbana adverts representing male models hijabized by the artist.

== Media appearances ==
Though the artist has rarely appeared in mainstream media, she is featured in the Banksy-produced The Antics Roadshow (the name of which parodies the Antiques Roadshow). The artist appeared in a bright, feathered, Carnivale-style costume "hijabizing" models in various fashion industry advertisements at Paris metro train stations. The documentary suggested the artist's work was primarily a protest against French Government efforts to ban the burqa in public though the artist herself has denied this.
