= Cadore 33 =

Studio album by Sergio Dalma
- Released: November 12, 2013
- Genre: Latin pop Pop
- Label: Warner Music
- Producer: Claudio Guidetti

Sergio Dalma chronology
| Via Dalma II (2011) | Cadore 33 (2013) | Yo Estuve Allí (2014) |

Popular Spanish singer Sergio Dalma followed 2011's four-times platinum Via Dalma II with Cadore 33. Unlike Dalma's previous two albums, which consisted of Spanish-language covers of Italian songs, this marked his return to performing original material.

The disc reunited the singer with producer Claudio Guidetti, who produced both 2010's Via Dalma and Via Dalma II. The title refers to the address of the studio in Milan, Italy, where the disc was recorded. Dalma has said he titled the disc as a nod to the Beatles' Abbey Road.

The album was preceded by the single "Si Te Vas," which was released Monday, September 30, 2013, and reached No. 21 in Spain. A music video, in which Dalma portrays the leader of a band of thieves, premiered Monday, October 21, 2013. The album also features a Catalan-language version of the song, for which Dalma wrote the lyrics.

Upon its first week in release, Cadore 33 topped the official album chart released by Productores de Música de España. Excluding compilations, this was Dalma's fifth consecutive album to reach No. 1 on the national chart. It was preceded by Via Dalma II (2011), Via Dalma (2010), Trece (2010) and A Buena Hora (2008).

Released simultaneously with the album was a special edition that came in an oversized box and featured a 2014 calendar.

== Track listing ==
1. "Si Te Vas"
2. "Tú Mi Bella"
3. "Recuerdo Crónico"
4. "Volar Sin Tí"
5. "Eres Oro"
6. "Contigo En El Camino"
7. "La Aceleración"
8. "Y Tú Qué Sabes"
9. "Un Preso En Tus Labios"
10. "Si Fueras Mía"
11. "Hay Vidas"
12. "Si Te'n Vas (Catalán)"
13. Diez mil vidas" - Only Digital iTunes

== Charts ==
=== Weekly charts ===
Weekly chart performance for Cadore 33
| Chart (2013) | Peak position |
|---|---|
| Spanish Albums (Promusicae) | 1 |

=== Year-end charts ===
Year-end chart performance for Cadore 33
| Chart (2013) | Position |
|---|---|
| Spanish Albums (PROMUSICAE) | 18 |
| Chart (2014) | Position |
| Spanish Albums (PROMUSICAE) | 20 |

== Certifications ==
Certifications for Cadore 33
| Region | Certification | Certified units/sales |
|---|---|---|
| Spain (Promusicae) | Platinum | 40,000^{^} |
^{^} Shipments figures based on certification alone.
