= Endless Road, 7058 =

Studio album by Auryn
- Released: October 18, 2011
- Recorded: 2011–2012
- Genres: Pop, pop rock
- Length: 55:55
- Label: WEA

Auryn chronology
Endless Road, 7058 (2011)	Anti-Héroes (2013)

Singles from The Journey
- 1. "Breathe in the Light" Released: May 2011; 2. "Last Night on Earth" Released: October 2011; 3. "I Don't Think So" Released: March 2012; 4. "Don't Give Up My Game" Released: 3 July 2012; 5. "1900" Released: November 2012

Endless Road, 7058 is the debut studio album released by Spanish boyband Auryn. The album was initially released on October 18, 2011, reaching #4 on the PROMUSICAE official Spanish Albums Chart. The album was subsequently re-released on September 18, 2012, which contains four extra songs, including "Volver", the song they performed during the finals of Destino Eurovisión 2011 in their bid to represent Spain in the Eurovision Song Contest 2011. A deluxe edition containing a CD and DVD was also released, which contained a number of acoustic performances, interviews, music videos and covers of Katy Perry and Coldplay.

== Track listing ==
Original release
No.	Title	Writer(s)	Length
1.	"Elevate"	Lisa Greene • Julian Emery • Ruth Lorenzo	3:39
2.	"Your Favourite Guy"	Virginia Labuat	3:01
3.	"Last Night on Earth"	Álvaro Gango • Dani Fernandez • Blas Cantó • David Lafuente • Carlos Marco • Magí Torras	3:29
4.	"Still"	Lisa Greene • Julian Emery • Ruth Lorenzo	3:09
5.	"Letters Entwined (Cartas Entrelazadas)"	Zahara Gordillo	5:19
6.	"I Don't Think So"	Tony Sánchez-Ohlsson • Thomas G:son • Samuel Waermö	3:47
7.	"Stop & Listen"	Belén Arjona • John Lanigan	3:31
8.	"Come Back (Volver)"	Primož Poglajen • Jonas Gladnikoff • Camilla Gottschalck • Christina Schilling	3:19
9.	"Breathe in the Light"	Julian Emery • Jim Irvin • Ruth Lorenzo	3:08
10.	"Rolling in the Deep"	Adele • Paul Epworth	3:52
11.	"I Learn to Live (He Aprendido A Vivir)"	Carlos Simón • Magí Torras	6:45
Total length:			42:59

Deluxe edition
No.	Title	Writer(s)	Length
1.	"Elevate"	Lisa Greene • Julian Emery • Ruth Lorenzo	3:39
2.	"1900"	Álvaro Gango • Dani Fernandez • Blas Cantó • David Lafuente • Carlos Marco • Magí Torras	3:00
3.	"Your Favourite Guy"	Virginia Labuat	3:01
4.	"Last Night on Earth"	Álvaro Gango • Dani Fernandez • Blas Cantó • David Lafuente • Carlos Marco • Magí Torras	3:29
5.	"Still"	Lisa Greene • Julian Emery • Ruth Lorenzo	3:09
6.	"Letters Entwined (Cartas Entrelazadas)"	Zahara Gordillo	5:19
7.	"Stop & Listen"	Belén Arjona • John Lanigan	3:31
8.	"I Don't Think So"	Tony Sánchez-Ohlsson • Thomas G:son • Samuel Waermö	3:47
9.	"Tear Down the Memories (Para Derribar Los Recuerdos)"	Reebop Kwaku Baah • Paul Delph • Bryson Graham • Rosko Gee	3:19
10.	"Breathe in the Light" (Danny Oton remix)	Julian Emery • Jim Irvin • Ruth Lorenzo	3:14
11.	"Don't Give Up My Game"	Álvaro Gango • Dani Fernandez • Blas Cantó • David Lafuente • Carlos Marco • Magí Torras • D. Ambrojo	3:20
12.	"Rolling in the Deep"	Adele • Paul Epworth	3:52
13.	"Come Back (Volver)"	Primož Poglajen • Jonas Gladnikoff • Camilla Gottschalck • Christina Schilling	3:19
14.	"I Learn to Live (He Aprendido A Vivir)"	Carlos Simón • Magí Torras	6:45
15.	"Conmigo" (I Don't Think So - Spanish Version)	Tony Sánchez-Ohlsson • Thomas G:son • Samuel Waermö	3:47

Super deluxe edition bonus DVD
No.	Title	Writer(s)	Length
1.	"I Don't Think So" (acoustic)	Tony Sánchez-Ohlsson • Thomas G:son • Samuel Waermö	3:47
2.	"Stop & Listen" (acoustic)	Belén Arjona • John Lanigan	3:31
3.	"1900" (acoustic)	Álvaro Gango • Dani Fernandez • Blas Cantó • David Lafuente • Carlos Marco • Magí Torras	3:00
4.	"The One that Got Away" (acoustic)	Katy Perry • Lukasz Gottwald • Max Martin	3:46
5.	"Tear Down the Memories (Para Derribar Los Recuerdos)" (acoustic, featuring Lahia Vehí)	Reebop Kwaku Baah • Paul Delph • Bryson Graham • Rosko Gee	3:19
6.	"Last Night on Earth" (acoustic)	Álvaro Gango • Dani Fernandez • Blas Cantó • David Lafuente • Carlos Marco • Magí Torras	3:29
7.	"Still" (acoustic)	Lisa Greene • Julian Emery • Ruth Lorenzo	3:09
8.	"Viva La Vida" (acoustic)	Guy Berryman • Jonny Buckland • Will Champion • Chris Martin	4:04
9.	""Alone with Auryn" - interview section"
10.	"Breathe in the Light - music video"
11.	"Last Night on Earth - music video"
12.	"Don't Give Up My Game - music video"
13.	"1900 - music video"

== Charts ==
Year (2011)	Peak position
PROMUSICAE Spanish Albums Chart	4

== Certifications ==
Region	Certification	Sales/Shipments
Spain (PROMUSICAE)	Gold	20,000
