= Rémi Gaillard =

French prankster

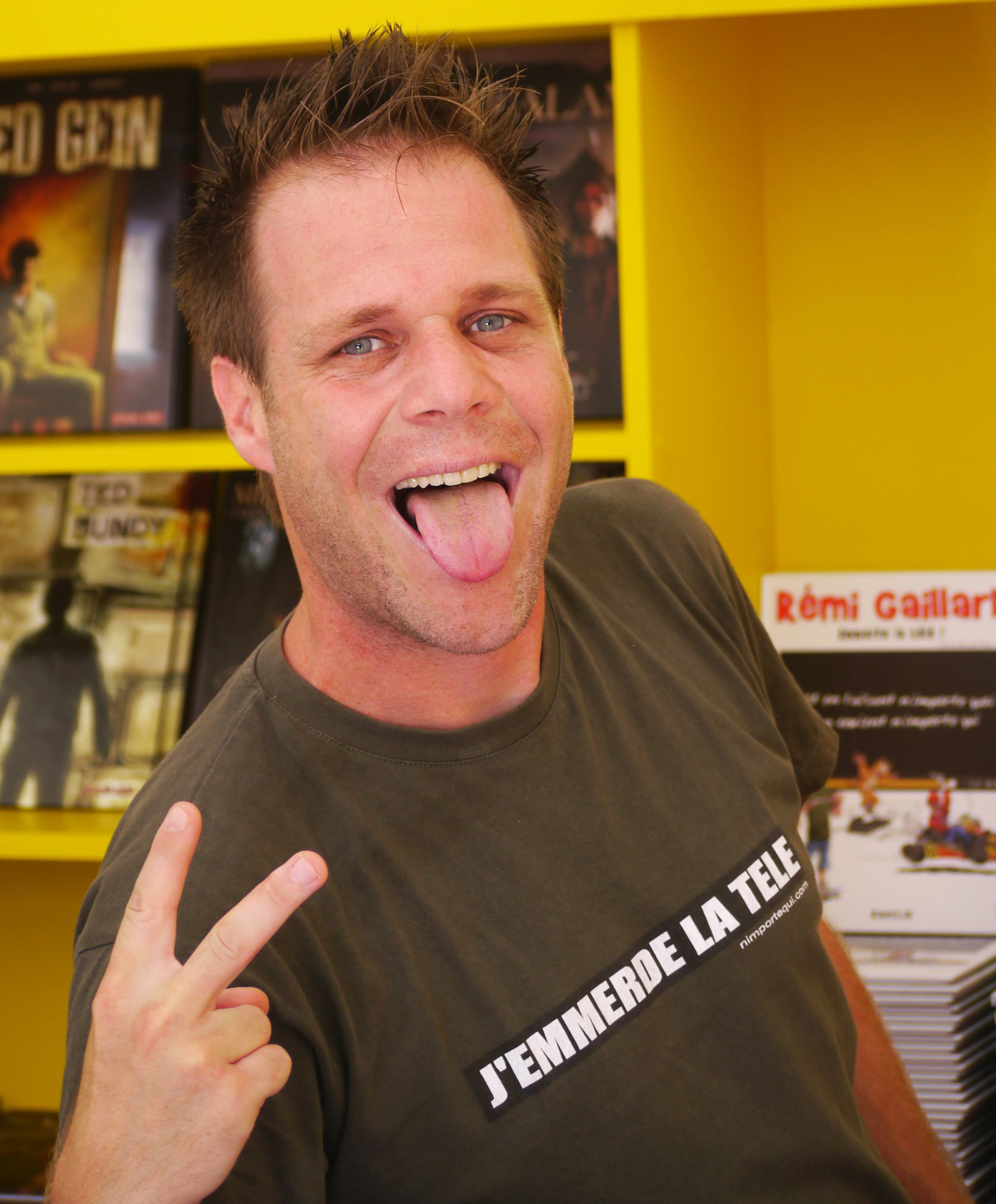
- Gaillard in 2011
- Born: 7 February 1975 (age 51); Montpellier, Languedoc-Roussillon, France
- Occupations: Prankster; YouTuber; Animal rights activist
- Years active: 1999–present

YouTube information
- Channel: Rémi GAILLARD
- Years active: 2007–2023
- Genres: Pranks; Entertainment
- Subscribers: 7.39 million
- Views: 2.02 billion
- Last updated: 21 August 2025
- Website: nimportequi.com

Rémi Gaillard (French pronunciation: [ʁemi ɡajaʁ]; born 7 February 1975) is a French prankster, YouTuber and animal rights activist. Well known for his videos on YouTube, his channel is the 100th most subscribed comedy channel on YouTube with more than 7.4 million subscribers as of August 2024.

After losing his job at a shoe store, Rémi began to use his free time to run pranks on the public. Gaillard gained attention in the French media in the early 2000s after performing a series of pranks, including an appearance disguised as a Lorient football player in the 2002 Coupe de France final match, during which he took part in the winners' celebrations and was greeted by then president of the French Republic, Jacques Chirac. He plays football non-professionally, and has posted numerous trick shot videos, including one with Brazilian footballer Ronaldo.

Gaillard has appeared in several sports events, TV game shows and political rallies as well as the 2011 Banksy-produced documentary, The Antics Roadshow.

On November 30, 2023, Gaillard published a video on his YouTube channel titled "EPILOGUE" in which he symbolically buried various logos of social media websites of which his content was uploaded to, alluding to a possible hiatus in his activity.

== Concept ==
Rémi Gaillard became known for his videos, in which he displays an "outrageous" style of humour. Recurring themes include dressing up as and interpreting the behaviour of various animals in public, racing unsuspecting car-drivers whilst dressed up as Mario à la Mario Kart, and numerous provocative interactions with parking enforcement officers and the police.

Gaillard's satirical motto is C'est en faisant n'importe quoi qu'on devient n'importe qui, meaning "It is by doing whatever that we become whoever". The understood meaning is satirical because "n'importe quoi" implies doing something ridiculous and "n'importe qui" implies no one important. It plays on a classic French proverb C'est en forgeant qu'on devient forgeron ("It is by smithing that one becomes a blacksmith").

== Sketches ==
The majority of Gaillard's sketches are of the hidden camera type, often disguising himself in outlandish costumes for his pranks. In some videos, Gaillard is accompanied by a crowd of friends, giving the action a flashmob-like nature.

Gaillard shot his first sketch in 1999 with a friend in Montpellier, and in 2001, he launched his website nimportequi.com.

He gained fame in 2002 at the finals of the Coupe de France.

He achieved further YouTube popularity through his Rocky Balboa parodies, Pac-Man, Mario Kart and Santa Claus pranks, as well as his football videos. His recent pranks often entail dressing up in large animal costumes; including a kangaroo and a bat. He has also dressed up as a bomb and a traffic enforcement camera, and has stayed locked in an animal cage for 87 hours to raise funds for animal shelters.

On his official site, Gaillard claims over 2.5 billion views on his videos on the web. His YouTube channel has 1.8 billion total views and his most popular YouTube video, "Kangaroo", has 90 million views.

In 2010, English comedian Dom Joly claimed that some of Gaillard's sketches plagiarize from Joly's show, Trigger Happy TV, as shown by YouTube channel CopyComic in December 2017. Gaillard responded by demonstrating that many of Dom Joly's own pranks may have equally been plagiarized from his own work as well as the work of other comedians including Buster Keaton.

== Movie ==
Gaillard starred in his first full-length feature film titled N'importe qui. It was directed by Raphaël Frydman and released on 5 March 2014, in France.

== Personal life ==
On 27 May 2024 Gaillard was hospitalised following a heart attack.

== See also ==
- Practical joke
- Trigger Happy TV
- World Freestyle Football Association
