= Auryn =

Spanish boy band

Background information
- Origin: Spain
- Genres: Pop, pop rock, teen pop, soft rock, electro pop, britpop, dance pop
- Years active: 2009–2016
- Labels: Must Producciones; Warner Music Spain
- Past members: Carlos Marco; Blas Cantó; Dani Fernández; Álvaro Gango; David Lafuente

Auryn (Spanish pronunciation: [ˈawɾin]; stylized as AURYN) was a 5-member Spanish boy band founded in 2009. Signed to Warner Music Spain, they sang in Spanish and English.

== Members ==
The band is made up of five members that appeared previously on various talent show series in Spain. Various members of the band have taken part at different occasions in contests like Factor X, Veo Veo, La Batalla de los Coros and at Junior Eurovision Song Contest qualifications. Dani Fernández represented Spain in the Junior Eurovision Song Contest 2006.

Blas Cantó and Dani Fernández have studied trumpet and piano at musical conservatories / schools. Carlos Marco has studied vocal techniques at "Escuela Orfeo" in Alicante. Álvaro Gango has taken part in gospel and classical choirs and has worked as actor and David Lafuente has learned in musical bands.

- Blas Cantó Moreno
- Daniel Fernández Delgado
- Alvaro Garcia-Gango Guijarro
- David Martin Lafuente
- Carlos Perez Marco

== Destino Eurovisión 2011 ==
Auryn gained great popularity particularly after they took part in Destino Eurovisión, the selection process to represent Spain in Eurovision Song Contest 2011 reaching the final 3. In Heat 1 held on 28 January 2011, where contestants needed to perform an earlier Eurovision song, they sang a cover of "Fly on the Wings of Love" from the Olsen Brothers (the Eurovision 2000 winner for Denmark). They qualified to the next round by televoting. In the semi-final round held on 11 February 2011, contestants had to pick another Eurovision classic, they sang "Eres tú" originally by Mocedades that finished runner-up in Eurovision 1973 for Spain. They qualified by a decision of the jury to the Finals where they were one of the Top 3, the other acts being Lucía Pérez and Melissa. Each act had to sing three original songs, with the jury picking one original song from each artist. Auryn sang "Evangeline", "El sol brillará" and "Volver". The latter was picked as their final song. Eventually, the Spanish qualifying entry for Eurovision 2011 went to Lucía Pérez and her song "Que me quiten lo bailao".

== Career ==
When the band was formed in 2009, they first gained attention through their online postings on YouTube including covers for Rihanna's "Umbrella" and Los Secretos' "Déjame". That was followed by an appearance on Destino Eurovisión 2011 (see above) where they finished in the Final 3, but failed to qualify for Eurovision 2011.

Based on the popularity they achieved, the band released their first single "Breathe in the Light" later in 2011 as well as their debut album Endless Road 7058 in 2012 both reaching the top 10 of the singles and album chart respectively. It won the "Best New Album" award at Televisión Española (TVE). Also spawning three top 10 singles, their follow-up album is Anti-Heroes was released in 2013 and went straight to number one on the album chart and has been certified platinum. Their third album "Circus Avenue" was preceded by the group's first number one single "Puppeteer" and reached number one on the album chart where it stayed for 5 consecutive weeks. The group released their fourth album "Ghost Town" in December 2015, seven months before going on hiatus.

== Origin of the name ==
The band's name refers to the fictional talisman AURYN from Michael Ende book The Neverending Story, being two mythological serpents, symmetrical, that bite at each other's tails. The charm of royal protection, when worn by a human, gives the wearer the power to fulfill all his wishes. Since the original word AURYN always appears in the book in all capitals, the band insists on naming its album titles in all capitals as well.

== Solo projects ==
As the band went into hiatus in 2016, various members of the band launched solo projects. Blas Cantó signed to Warner Music Spain and released his debut solo single "In Your Bed". They officially announced the breakup of the band on 28 July 2016.

== Discography ==
Studio albums

| Year | Album | Chart position | Certification |
| Year | Album | SPA | Certification |
|---|---|---|---|
| 2011 | Endless Road, 7058 | 4 | Gold |
| 2013 | Anti-Heroes | 1 | Platinum |
| 2014 | Circus Avenue | 1 | Platinum |
| 2015 | Ghost Town | 1 | Gold |

Singles

| Year | Single | Chart positions | Album |
| Year | Single | SPA | Album |
|---|---|---|---|
| 2011 | "Breathe in the Light" | 10 | Endless Road 7058 |
| 2011 | "Last Night on Earth" | 6 | Endless Road 7058 |
| 2012 | "I Don't Think So" | 7 | Endless Road 7058 |
| 2012 | "Don't Give Up My Game" | 13 | Endless Road 7058 |
| 2012 | "1900" | — | Endless Road 7058 |
| 2012 | "I Met An Angel (On Christmas Day)" | 39 | Christmas non-album release |
| 2013 | "Cuando te volveré a ver" | 34 | From Spanish soundtrack of Wreck-It Ralph |
| 2013 | "Heartbreaker" | 13 | Anti-Heroes |
| 2013 | "Make My Day" | 3 | Anti-Heroes |
| 2013 | "Breathe Your Fire" | 10 | Anti-Heroes |
| 2014 | "Puppeteer" | 1 | Circus Avenue |
| 2014 | "Saturday I'm in Love" | 34 | Circus Avenue |
| 2014 | "Get Ya Flowers / Pillow Talk" | 5 | Circus Avenue |
| 2015 | "I'll Reach You" | 12 | From soundtrack of Capture the Flag |
| 2015 | "Electric" | 19 | Ghost Town |
| 2016 | "Who's Loving You" (featuring Anastacia) | 28 | Ghost Town |

Other releases

- 2011: "Volver" (Destino Eurovisión 2011)
- 2011: "Evangeline" (Destino Eurovisión 2011)
- 2011: "El sol brillará" (Destino Eurovisión 2011)

=== CD/DVDs ===
- 2012: Endless Road, 7058
- 2013: Anti-Heroes
- 2014: Circus Avenue

== Awards and nominations ==
| Year | Awards | Category | Nominee/work | Result |
|---|---|---|---|---|
| 2011 | Habboritos de Habbo | Best New Artist | Auryn | Won |
| 2011 | Disco del año de TVE | Best Album by a New Act | Endless Road, 7058 | Won |
| 2012 | Premios RadioCAN | Best International Song | "Last Night on Earth" | Won |
| 2012 | Premios elRemix | Best National Debut | Auryn | Won |
| 2012 | Neox Fan Awards | Best Flirting Song | "Don't Give Up My Name" | Won |
| 2012 | Neox Fan Awards | Best Spanish Group | Auryn | Won |
| 2012 | Premios 40 Principales | Best Spanish New Artist | Auryn | Won |
| 2012 | Premios 40 Principales | Best Spanish Album | Endless Road, 7058 | Nominated |
| 2013 | Neox Fan Awards | Best Spanish Group | Auryn | Won |
| 2013 | Neox Fan Awards | Single of the Year | "Heartbreaker" | Won |
| 2013 | Neox Fan Awards | Most Tweeted About Award Show Guests | Auryn | Won |
| 2013 | MTV Europe Music Awards | Best Spanish Act | Auryn | Won |
| 2013 | MTV Europe Music Awards | Best Southern European Act | Auryn | Nominated |
| 2013 | Premios 40 Principales | Best Spanish Artist or Group | Auryn | Nominated |
| 2013 | Premios 40 Principales | Best Spanish Video | "Make My Day" | Won |
| 2014 | Neox Fan Awards | Best Group of the Year | Auryn | Won |
| 2014 | Neox Fan Awards | Best Song of the Year | "Breathe Your Fire" | Won |
| 2014 | Neox Fan Awards | Best Selfie | Auryn | Won |
| 2014 | Premios 40 Principales | Best Spanish Video | "Puppeteer" | Nominated |
| 2015 | Neox Fan Awards | Best Group of the Year | Auryn | Nominated |
| 2015 | Premios 40 Principales | Best Spanish Album | Circus Avenue | Nominated |
