= Dani Fernández (singer) =

Spanish singer (born 1991)

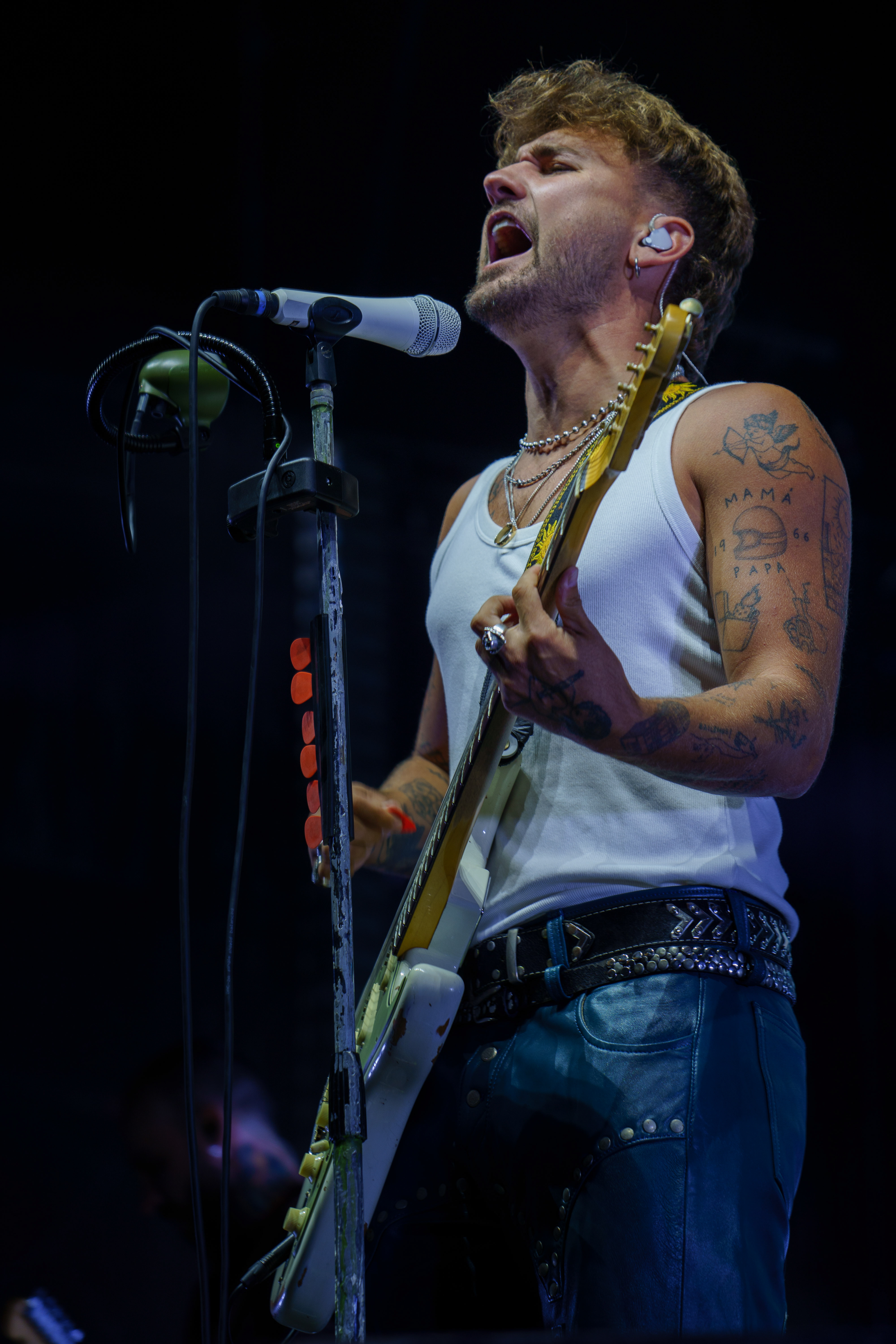
- Fernández in 2025

Background information
- Born: Daniel Fernández Delgado; 11 December 1991 (age 34); Alcázar de San Juan, Ciudad Real, Spain
- Genres: Pop, pop rock
- Occupations: Singer; songwriter
- Instrument: Vocals
- Years active: 2006—present
- Label: Warner Music Spain
- Formerly of: Auryn

Daniel Fernández Delgado (born 11 December 1991), known professionally as Dani Fernández, is a Spanish singer and songwriter. He represented Spain in the Junior Eurovision Song Contest 2006 with the song "Te doy mi voz", finishing in fourth place. In 2009, he became a founding member of the boy band Auryn, alongside Blas Cantó, Álvaro Gango, Carlos Marco and David Lafuente, with whom he released four studio albums before the group's separation in 2016. Since 2016, he has pursued a solo career, releasing the studio albums Incendios (2019), Entre las dudas y el azar (2022) and La Jauría (2024), and winning the 2022 Ondas Award for Musical Phenomenon of the Year.

== Career ==
=== 2006: Junior Eurovision Song Contest ===
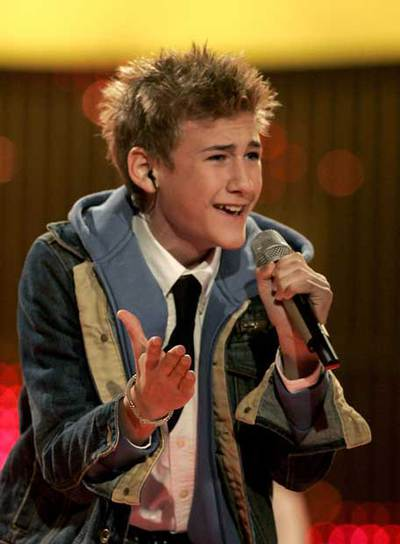
Dani Fernández during his performance in the Junior Eurovision Song Contest 2006.

In 2006, at age fourteen, Fernández won a local singing contest in his hometown of Alcázar de San Juan before being selected through Eurojunior, the national final organised by Televisión Española (TVE), to represent Spain at the Junior Eurovision Song Contest 2006 with the song "Te doy mi voz". The contest was held on 2 December 2006 in Bucharest, Romania, where he finished in fourth place with 90 points. He later said in a 2024 podcast interview that the performance, delivered while his voice was breaking, was one of the most difficult experiences of his career, despite the strong placement.

=== 2009–2016: Auryn ===
In January 2009, Fernández became a founding member of the boy band Auryn, together with Álvaro Gango, Blas Cantó, Carlos Marco and David Lafuente. The band rose to prominence following its participation in Destino Eurovisión, the 2011 national selection process for the Eurovision Song Contest 2011, in which it finished second. Auryn went on to release four studio albums — Endless Road, 7058 (2011), Anti-Heroes (2013), Circus Avenue (2014) and Ghost Town (2015) — the first three of which reached number one on the Spanish Albums Chart, before the band announced its breakup in 2016.

=== 2016–present: Solo career ===
Following Auryn's separation, Fernández began working on a solo project, releasing an acoustic cover of Andrés Suárez's "No saben de ti" on YouTube in December 2016 as an introduction to the musical style of his solo work. His debut solo single, "Te esperaré toda la vida", was released on 18 May 2018 and later received a platinum certification; a follow-up EP, En llamas, was released that November. He released his debut solo studio album, Incendios, on 24 May 2019 through Warner Music Spain, produced by Tato Latorre; the album's singles "Bailemos" and "Disparos" were also certified platinum and gold respectively and reached the top ten of Spanish radio airplay charts. An acoustic reissue of the album, titled Incendios y Cenizas, followed in 2020.

Fernández released his second solo studio album, Entre las dudas y el azar, in 2022, featuring collaborations with Juancho de Sidecars and Nil Moliner. The album was recognized at the 2022 Premios Ondas, where Fernández won the award for Musical Phenomenon of the Year, and at the 2022 LOS40 Music Awards, where he was named Best Artist. He went on to sell out concerts at Madrid's WiZink Center and Barcelona's Palau Sant Jordi. In 2023, he received the Música category prize at the Premios Ídolo.

His third solo studio album, La Jauría, was released in 2024; in support of the release, Fernández was again nominated at the LOS40 Music Awards. In March 2025, the city council of his hometown, Alcázar de San Juan, announced it would name him a "Hijo Predilecto" (favourite son) of the city in recognition of his musical career.

== Personal life ==
Fernández married Spanish singer-songwriter Yarea Guillén in 2022; the couple's first daughter was born the following year.

== Discography ==
=== Studio albums ===
Title	Details
Incendios	Released: 24 May 2019; Label: Warner Music Spain
Incendios y Cenizas (acoustic reissue)	Released: 2020; Label: Warner Music Spain
Entre las dudas y el azar	Released: 2022; Label: Warner Music Spain
La Jauría	Released: 2024; Label: Warner Music Spain

=== Extended plays ===
Title	Details
En llamas	Released: 23 November 2018; Label: Warner Music Spain

=== Singles ===
Title	Year	Album
"Te esperaré toda la vida"	2018	Incendios
"Bailemos"	2019	Incendios
"Disparos"	2019	Incendios
"Dile a los demás"	2022	Entre las dudas y el azar
"Clima tropical"	2022	Entre las dudas y el azar
"Todo cambia"	2024	La Jauría
"Me has invitado a bailar"	2024	La Jauría

== Awards and nominations ==
Year	Organization	Category	Result	Ref.
2022	Premios Ondas	Musical Phenomenon of the Year	Won	
2022	LOS40 Music Awards	Best Artist	Won	
2023	Premios Ídolo	Music	Won	

Awards and achievements
Preceded by Antonio José with "Te traigo flores"	Spain in the Junior Eurovision Song Contest; 2006	Succeeded by Melani García with "Marte"
