= Jimmy Jump =

Spanish pitch and stage invader

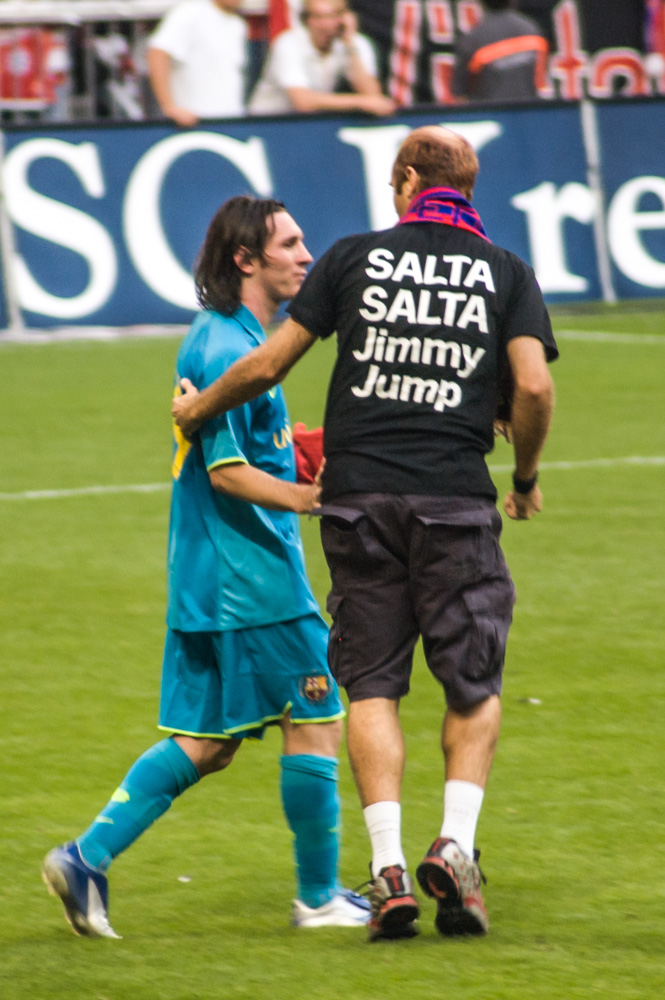
- Jimmy Jump (right) and Lionel Messi (left)
- Born: Jaume Marquet i Cot; 14 March 1976 (age 50)
- Other name: Jimmy Jump
- Known for: Streaking at several major entertainment and sporting events
- Website: jimmyjump.com

Jaume Marquet i Cot (Catalan pronunciation: [ˈʒawmə məɾˈkɛt i kɔt]), more popularly known as Jimmy Jump (born 14 March 1976), is a pitch invader from Sabadell, Catalonia, Spain, known for interfering in several major entertainment and sporting events.

== Incidents ==
=== Football ===
On 4 July 2004, during the UEFA Euro 2004 final between Greece and Portugal, Jimmy threw an FC Barcelona flag at Portuguese captain Luís Figo, who left Barcelona to join their arch-rivals Real Madrid in 2000.

In the semi-final of 2005–06 UEFA Champions League between Villarreal and Arsenal, Jimmy ran onto the pitch just before the start of the second half and threw a Barcelona shirt (with the name Henry and number 14) at Arsenal's Thierry Henry. Coincidentally, Henry signed for Barcelona in 2007.

During the final of the 2007 UEFA Champions League final between AC Milan and Liverpool in Athens, Greece, Jimmy ran down the pitch with a Greek flag, but his action was not shown by television cameras. In August of the same year, he put a hat on Lionel Messi after the Argentine scored a goal against Bayern Munich.

Jimmy also appeared in the UEFA Euro 2008 semi-final between Germany and Turkey, carrying a flag of Tibet and a shirt with the inscription "Tibet is not China".

On 11 July 2010, moments before the 2010 FIFA World Cup final between Spain and the Netherlands in Johannesburg, South Africa, Jimmy rushed onto the field and attempted to place a barretina on the World Cup trophy before being apprehended by several security guards. He was ordered to pay a ZAR2,000 fine.

On 11 September 2010, Jimmy ran onto the pitch before the second half of the Hungarian Derby between Újpest and Ferencváros, holding a Catalan flag with the message "Kubala forever" in honour of former Barcelona and Ferencvárosi player László Kubala and kicked the ball into the Ferencváros goal. Security handed him over to the police and he was taken into custody for four hours, before being released and fined approximately EUR350.

=== Formula 1 ===
In the 2004 Spanish Grand Prix, Jimmy ran through the starting grid during the formation lap, only to be apprehended by race marshals shortly after. While he claimed to have many fans (due to his other performances at football matches), he was criticized for risking the lives of the drivers, even though the cars were travelling at low speed at this point.

=== Tennis ===
During the 2009 men's singles final of the French Open, Jimmy accosted eventual winner Roger Federer, attempting to place a red barretina on his head. He was tackled by a security guard after stumbling over the net and faced up to 12 months in prison for the incident.

=== Eurovision Song Contest ===
During the 2010 Eurovision Song Contest in Norway, Jimmy invaded the stage during the Spanish performance by Daniel Diges and took part in the choreography. He subsequently left the stage at the venue and was immediately escorted away from the concert area and taken to Sandvika police station, where he was arrested and fined NOK15,000. Due to the incident, Svante Stockselius, the executive supervisor of the Eurovision Song Contest at that time, allowed Spain to perform for a second time after the last regular performance.

=== Goya Awards ===
On 13 February 2011, during the 25th Goya Awards ceremony, Jimmy invaded the stage just before the best actor award was handed over to Javier Bardem. Before being whisked away, he could say only a few words on the microphone and cover the Best Actor Goya statuette with a barretina.

=== Elsewhere ===
On 14 September 2010, after the 2010–11 UEFA Champions League group stage, Jimmy appeared in a weather forecast on Hungarian television channel TV2. He waved, shouting "Barcelona, Barcelona!", placed his cap on the forecaster, and chanted "Barça".

== See also ==
- Mark Roberts – a UK serial streaker
