= Michael Fagan =

Intruder into Buckingham Palace (born 1948)

- Born: 8 August 1948 (age 78); Clerkenwell, London, England
- Known for: Entering Buckingham Palace twice; entering Queen Elizabeth II's bedroom in Buckingham Palace (1982)
- Criminal charges: Assaulting a police officer (1984); Conspiring to supply heroin (1997)
- Criminal penalty: Three months in prison (1984); Four years in prison (1997)
- Criminal status: Suspended sentence (1984); Imprisoned (1997)
- Spouse: Christine Fagan (m. 1972)
- Children: 4

Michael Fagan (born 8 August 1948) is a British citizen who intruded into Queen Elizabeth II's bedroom in Buckingham Palace in 1982.

== Early life ==
Michael Fagan was born in Clerkenwell, London, on 8 August 1948, the son of Ivy and Michael Fagan Sr. His father was a steel erector and a "champion" safe-breaker. He had two younger sisters, Marjorie and Elizabeth. In 1955, he attended Compton Street School in Clerkenwell (later St Peter & St Paul RC Primary School). In 1966, he left home at 18 to escape his father who, Fagan says, was violent. He started working as a painter and decorator. In 1972, he married Christine, with whom he had four children (she left him the year of the break-ins, but later came back). At some point in the 1970s–1980s, Fagan was a member of a North London branch of the Workers Revolutionary Party.

== Break-ins ==
=== First entry ===
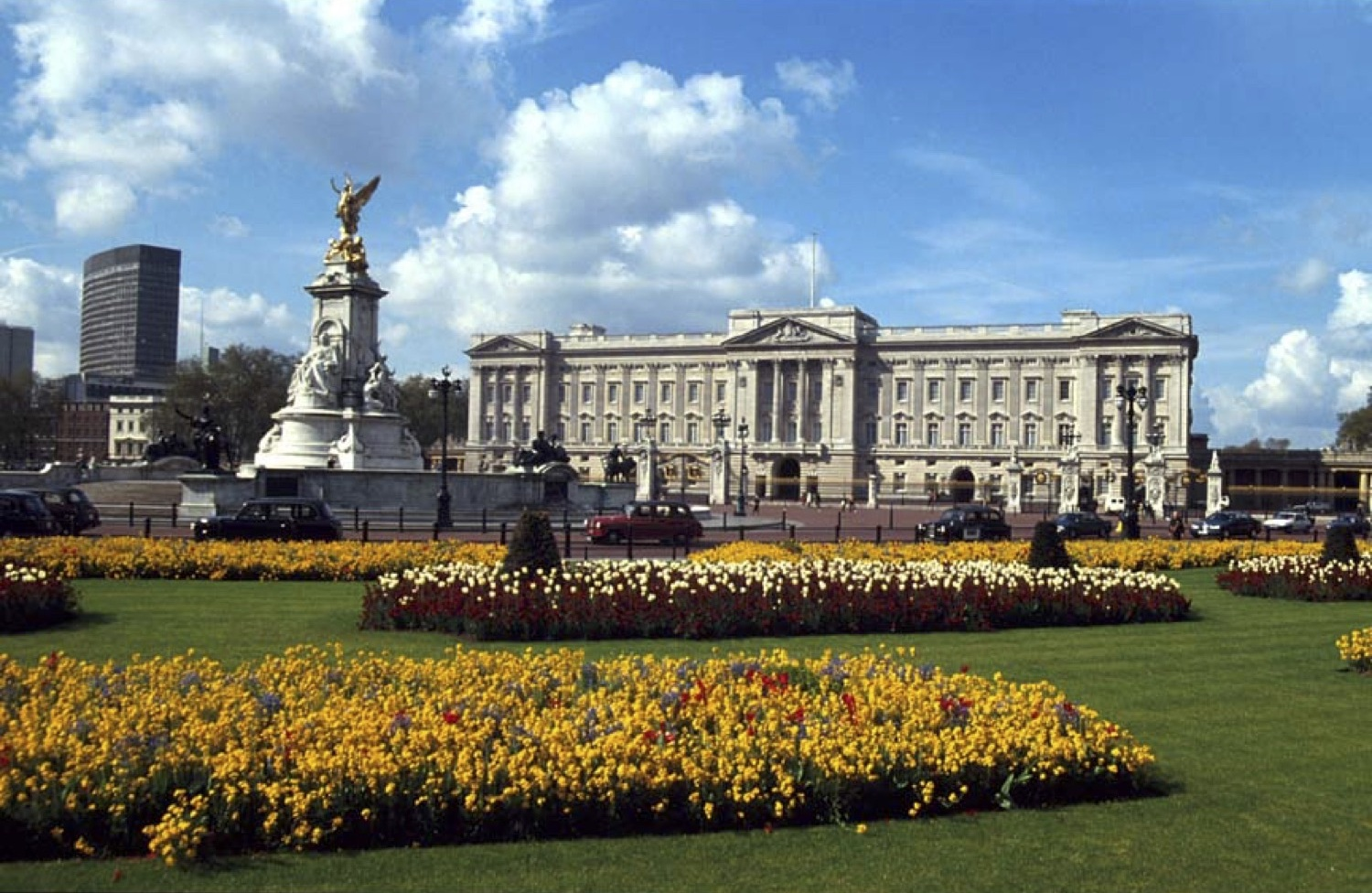
Buckingham Palace, pictured in 1980

On 7 June 1982, Fagan intruded into Buckingham Palace for the first time. He stated that he shimmied up a drainpipe to a third-floor window and startled a housemaid, who called security. He disappeared before guards arrived, who then disbelieved the housemaid's report. Fagan said he wandered around for the next half-hour while eating cheese and crackers. Three alarms in total were tripped, but the police turned them off, believing they were faulty. He viewed royal portraits and sat for some time on a throne. He also spoke of entering the post room. He drank half a bottle of wine, intending to wait until his capture, but eventually became tired and left.

=== Second entry ===
At around 6:00 a.m. on 9 July 1982, Fagan scaled Buckingham Palace's 14-foot-high (4.3 m) perimeter wall, which was topped with revolving spikes and barbed wire, and climbed up a drainpipe. An alarm sensor detected his movements, but police again thought the alarm was faulty and silenced it. Fagan wandered the corridors for several minutes before reaching the royal apartments. In an anteroom, Fagan broke a glass ashtray, cutting his hand. He entered the bedroom of Queen Elizabeth II at about 7:15 am carrying a fragment of glass.

The Queen woke when Fagan disturbed a curtain. Initial reports said he had sat on the edge of her bed and that they had a long conversation; however, Fagan said in a 2012 interview to The Independent that the Queen immediately ran away barefoot and quickly. The Queen phoned the palace switchboard twice for police, but none arrived, so she used her bedside alarm bell. She also beckoned a housemaid in the corridor, who was quickly dispatched to seek urgent help. The duty footman, Paul Whybrew, who had been walking the Queen's dogs, arrived, followed by two policemen on palace duty, who removed Fagan. The incident had happened as the armed police officer outside the royal bedroom came off duty before his replacement arrived.

A subsequent police report was critical of the competence of officers on duty, as well as a system of confused and divided command. The Home Secretary, who held sole responsibility for the police, William Whitelaw, offered his resignation but it was refused by Prime Minister Margaret Thatcher.

== Arrest ==
Since Fagan's actions were, at the time, a civil wrong rather than a criminal offence, he was not charged with trespassing in the Queen's bedroom. He was charged with theft of the wine, but the charges were dropped when he was committed for psychiatric evaluation. In late July, Fagan's mother said, "He thinks so much of the Queen. I can imagine him just wanting to simply talk and say hello and discuss his problems." He spent the next three months in a psychiatric hospital before being released on 21 January 1983.

It was not until 2005, when Buckingham Palace became a "designated site" for the purposes of section 128 of the Serious Organised Crime and Police Act 2005, that trespass at the palace became a criminal offence.

== Later life ==
Two years after entering Buckingham Palace, Fagan attacked a policeman at a café in Fishguard, Wales, and was given a three-month suspended sentence. In 1983, Fagan recorded a cover version of the Sex Pistols song "God Save the Queen" with punk band the Bollock Brothers. In 1997, he was imprisoned for four years after he, his wife and their 20-year-old son were charged with conspiring to supply heroin.

Fagan made an appearance in Channel 4's The Antics Roadshow, an hour-long 2011 TV documentary directed by the artist Banksy and Jaimie D'Cruz charting the history of people behaving oddly in public.

After the death of the Queen on 8 September 2022, Fagan told reporters that he had lit a candle in her memory at a local church.

== In fiction ==
The intrusion was adapted in 2012 for an episode of Sky Arts' Playhouse Presents series entitled "Walking the Dogs", a one-off British comedy drama featuring Emma Thompson as the Queen and Eddie Marsan as the intruder. In 2020, Tom Brooke played Fagan in the fifth episode of season 4 of The Crown. Lyrics 'So I broke into the Palace With a sponge and a rusty spanner ...' in The Smiths song The Queen Is Dead were inspired by the trespass. The intrusion also inspired Trinidadian calypso singer Mighty Sparrow to write his ironic song "Phillip My Dear", very loosely based on the event.

== See also ==
- The boy Jones, serial intruder to Buckingham Palace in the 1800s
- The BFG, 1982 children's novel in which the protagonist Sophie intrudes into the Queen's bedroom
