= Anti-Heroes (Auryn album) =

Anti-Héroes

Studio album by Auryn
- Released: March 2013
- Recorded: 2012–13
- Genre: Pop, pop rock
- Length: 37:48 (standard edition)
- Label: WEA

Auryn chronology
Endless Road, 7058 (2012)	Anti-Héroes (2013)	Circus Avenue (2014)

Singles from Anti-Héroes
- 1. ""Heartbreaker"" Released: February 2013; 2. ""Make My Day""; 3. ""Breathe Your Fire""

Anti-Héroes is the second studio album released by Spanish boyband Auryn. It debuted at No.1 on the PROMUSICAE official Spanish Albums Chart.

== Track listing ==
Standard Edition
No.	Title	Length
1.	"Route 66 (Up We Go!)"	3:34
2.	"Heartbreaker"	3:31
3.	"Love Taxi"	3:05
4.	"Me Gusta"	3:42
5.	"Make My Day"	2:58
6.	"Breathe Your Fire"	3:20
7.	"Away"	3:05
8.	"Sentado En El Banco"	4:38
9.	"Desaparecer"	3:40
10.	"Somebody Loves You"	3:09
11.	"Siempre Estás Ahí"	3:06

Fan edition
No.	Title	Length
1.	"Route 66 (Up We Go!)"
2.	"Heartbreaker"
3.	"Love Taxi"
4.	"Me Gusta"
5.	"Make My Day"
6.	"Breathe Your Fire"
7.	"Away"
8.	"Cuando Sé Que Estás Dormida"
9.	"Desaparecer"
10.	"Somebody Loves You"
11.	"Sentado En El Banco"
12.	"Better Than Me"
13.	"Nada"
14.	"I Can't Break Up"
15.	"Siempre Estás Ahí"

Instrumentals
No.	Title	Length
1.	"Route 66 (Up We Go!)" (Instrumental)
2.	"Heartbreaker" (Instrumental)
3.	"Love Taxi" (Instrumental)
4.	"Me Gusta" (Instrumental)
5.	"Make My Day" (Instrumental)
6.	"Breathe Your Fire" (Instrumental)
7.	"Away" (Instrumental)
8.	"Cuando Sé Que Estás Dormida" (Instrumental)
9.	"Desaparecer" (Instrumental)
10.	"Somebody Loves You" (Instrumental)
11.	"Sentado En El Banco" (Instrumental)

== Charts ==
=== Weekly charts ===
Year (2011)	Peak position
PROMUSICAE Spanish Albums Chart	1

=== Annual Charts ===
Year-End Chart (2013)	Peak position
Spain (PROMUSICAE)	11

== Certifications ==
Region	Certification	Sales/Shipements
Spain (PROMUSICAE)	Platinum	40,000

== See also ==
- List of number-one albums of 2013 (Spain)
