= Daniel Diges (album) =

Studio album by Daniel Diges
- Released: 18 May 2010
- Recorded: 2010
- Genre: Pop Latino
- Label: Warner Music Spain

Singles from Daniel Diges
- 1. "Algo pequeñito" Released: 12 April 2010; 2. "Quédate conmigo" Released: 9 August 2010

Daniel Diges is the self-titled debut album from Spanish singer, pianist, composer and actor Daniel Diges, released on 18 May 2010. The first single from the album "Algo pequeñito" released on 12 April 2010.

== Singles ==
- "Algo pequeñito" was the first single released from the album; Daniel Diges performed the song for Spain at the Eurovision Song Contest 2010. In the final Diges scored 68 points and finished 15th.
- "Quédate conmigo" was the second single from the album released on 9 August 2010 as a Digital download.

== Track listing ==
No.	Title	Length
1.	"Se abre el telón"	2:41
2.	"Algo pequeñito"	3:00
3.	"Quédate conmigo"	3:34
4.	"Eres perfecta para mí" (Just the Way You Are)	5:08
5.	"Te quiero así" (Everything)	3:32
6.	"Rápido"	3:13
7.	"Te dejé marchar"	3:51
8.	"Soñar"	3:56
9.	"Todo me sabe a ti"	3:20
10.	"Angel" (Angels)	4:25
11.	"Si no miras no lo ves" (A Clue About You)	2:59
12.	"Alejandra"	3:34
13.	"Algo pequeñito" (Versión Swing-Jazz)	3:25

== Charts ==
Chart (2010)	Peak position
Spanish Albums Chart	6

== Release history ==
Country	Date	Format	Label
Spain	18 May 2010	Digital download	Warner Music Spain
