= Circus Avenue =

Studio album by Auryn
- Released: 30 September 2014
- Recorded: 2013–14
- Genre: Pop, pop rock
- Length: 65:33 (Fan Edition)
- Label: WEA
- Producer: Tony Sanchez-Ohlsson • Red Triangle • Alex Shield • Kim Fanlo

Auryn chronology
Anti-Héroes (2013)	Circus Avenue (2014)	Ghost Town (2015)

Singles from Circus Avenue
- 1. "Puppeteer" Released: 29 July 2014; 2. "Saturday I'm In Love" Released: 20 January 2015; 3. "Tic Tac" Released: 18 March 2015

Circus Avenue is the third studio album released by Spanish boyband Auryn. It debuted at No.1 on the PROMUSICAE official Spanish Albums Chart and includes the band's first No.1 single, "Puppeteer". The album is the band's first release to be recorded solely in English (with the exception of the two bonus tracks). The album also spawned the hit single "Saturday I'm In Love".

On April 14, 2015, a special edition of the album was released, entitled Circus Avenue Night, which contains a DVD of the band's Circus Avenue tour as well as a CD which contains the entire album, as well as the brand new single "Tic Tac", which appears exclusively on this version. The band worked with a number of producers on the album, including English-based production team Red Triangle and Swedish producers Jörgen Elofsson and David Kreuger.

== Track listing ==
No.	Title	Writer(s)	Producer(s)	Length
1.	"When We Were Young"	Andreas Ohrn • Chris Wahle • Eddie Razaz	Tony Sanchez-Ohlsson	3:52
2.	"Puppeteer"	Will Simms • Tobias Stenkjaer	Tony Sanchez-Ohlsson	3:28
3.	"Saturday I'm In Love"	Tony Sánchez-Ohlsson • Thomas G:son	Tony Sanchez-Ohlsson	4:02
4.	"If This Was My Last Song"	David Cook • Jimmy Welsh • Kevin Bard	Tony Sanchez-Ohlsson	3:39
5.	"Stay"	Nalle Ahlstedt • Kameron Alexander	Tony Sanchez-Ohlsson	3:39
6.	"Just A Little Bit"	Rick Parkhouse • George Tizzard • Andrew Bullimore	Red Triangle	3:05
7.	"Incredible"	Andreas Ohrn • Chris Wahle • Henrik Smith	Alex Shield	3:52
8.	"Get Ya Flowers"	Jörgen Elofsson • David Kreuger • Lars Kempe	Tony Sanchez-Ohlsson	3:06
9.	"Pillow Talk"	Andreas Ohrn • Peter Boström	Tony Sanchez-Ohlsson	3:48
10.	"Grow Old With Me"	Brandyn Burnette • Ali Tamposi	Tony Sanchez-Ohlsson	3:07
11.	"El Niño Frente A Mí" (Bonus Track)	Xabi San-Martin	Kim Fanlo	3:12
12.	"Vuelvo A Ser Mortal (Antiheroe)" (Bonus Track)	Alex Olmedo	Kim Fanlo	4:25

Circus Avenue - Night edition bonus track
No.	Title	Length
13.	"Tic Tac"	3:18

Circus Avenue - Fan edition bonus disc
No.	Title	Writer(s)	Producer(s)	Length
1.	"When We Were Young" (Acoustic)	Andreas Ohrn • Chris Wahle • Eddie Razaz	Tony Sanchez-Ohlsson	3:52
2.	"Saturday I'm In Love" (Acoustic)	Tony Sánchez-Ohlsson • Thomas G:son	Tony Sanchez-Ohlsson	3:50
3.	"Puppeteer" (Acoustic)	Will Simms • Tobias Stenkjaer	Tony Sanchez-Ohlsson	3:28
4.	"Incredible" (Acoustic)	Andreas Ohrn • Chris Wahle • Henrik Smith	Alex Shield	3:16
5.	"Stay" (Acoustic)	Nalle Ahlstedt • Kameron Alexander	Tony Sanchez-Ohlsson	3:39
6.	"Puppeteer" (Danny Oton Remix)	Will Simms • Tobias Stenkjaer	Danny Oton	4:06

== Charts ==
=== Weekly charts ===
Weekly chart performance for Circus Avenue
Chart (2014)	Peak position
Spanish Albums (PROMUSICAE)	1

=== Year-end charts ===
Year-end chart performance for Circus Avenue
Chart (2014)	Position
Spanish Albums (PROMUSICAE)	24
Chart (2015)	Position
Spanish Albums (PROMUSICAE)	43

== Certifications ==
Certifications for Circus Avenue
Region	Certification	Certified units/sales
Spain (PROMUSICAE)	Gold	20,000^{^}
^{^} Shipments figures based on certification alone.

== See also ==
- List of number-one albums of 2014 (Spain)
