= Bollock Brothers =

British band

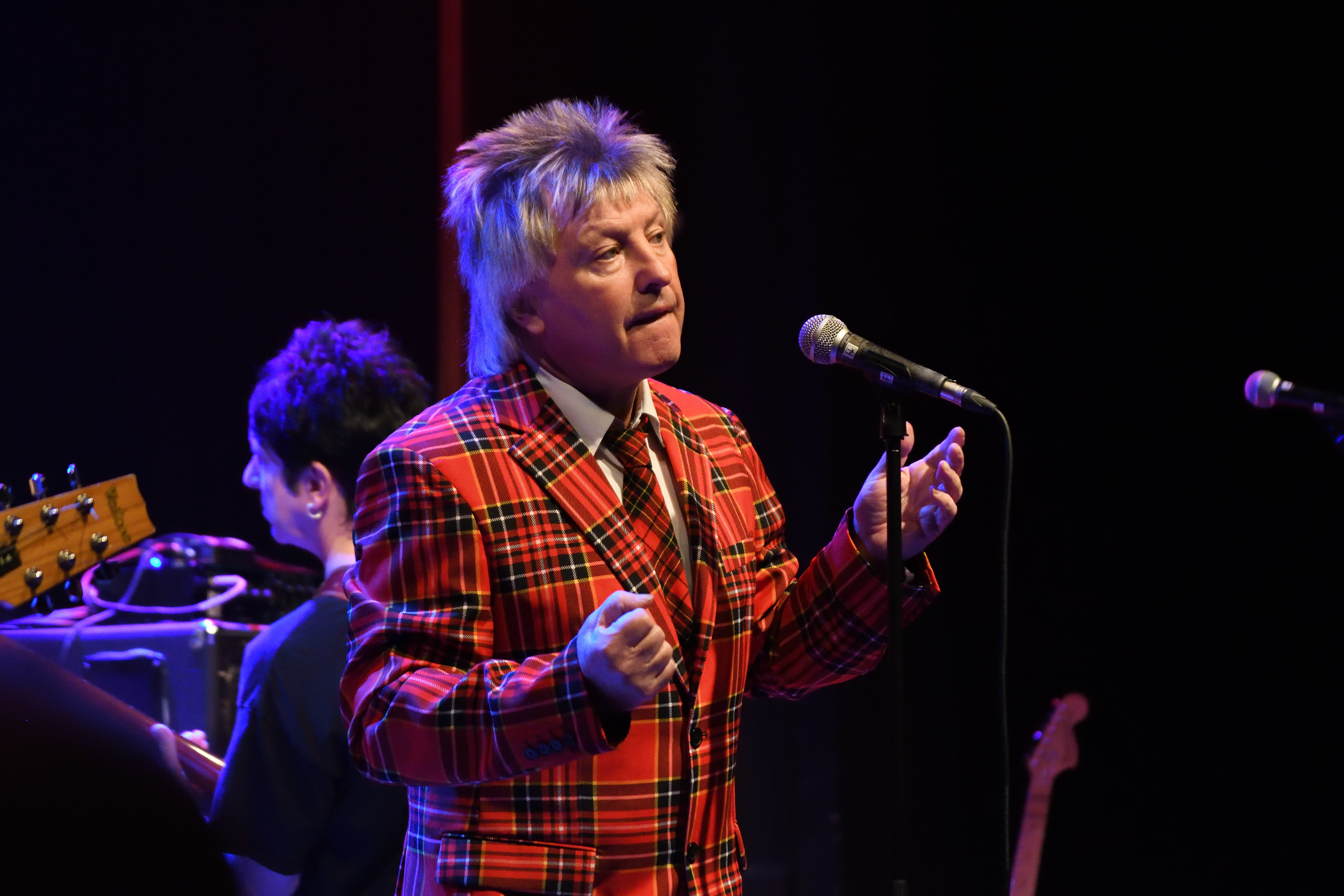
Frontman Jock McDonald

The Bollock Brothers are a British band formed in 1979 by the London promoter, DJ and manager Jock McDonald. They are most notable for their English-language cover of Serge Gainsbourg's song "Harley David (Son of a Bitch)" (originally in French) and Alex Harvey's "Faith Healer".

As well as being known for their original songs "Horror Movies", "The Bunker", "The Legend of the Snake" and "The Slow Removal of the Left Ear of Vincent van Gogh" which featured Martin Glover of the band Killing Joke, they are known for their release of cover versions by artists Led Zeppelin, The Sensational Alex Harvey Band, Steppenwolf, David Bowie and Vangelis, among others.

Their 1983 electro version of the Sex Pistols' album Never Mind the Bollocks featured Michael Fagan, the man who entered the Queen's bedchamber at Buckingham Palace. Jimmy Lydon, brother of Johnny Rotten, was a featured vocalist for a short period in the early 1980s.

Having released nine studio albums as well as other EPs, singles, live releases and compilations, the band continued to play music throughout Europe, primarily in Belgium, Germany and France. The members were Jock McDonald (vocals), Chris McKelvey (guitar), Richard Collins (bass), Klaus Fiehe, Patrick Pattyn (drums), Ciaran Crossan (guitar) and Morgan Michaux (keyboard). Their album Last Will & Testament (2009) was dedicated to their longtime keyboard player "Big Mark" Humphries, who died in 2008.

Jock McDonald died in a drowning incident in Bundoran, on 26 July 2025, at the age of 69.

== Discography ==
=== Studio albums ===
- The Last Supper (Charly) March 1983
- Never Mind the Bollocks 1983 (Charly) August 1983
- The 4 Horsemen of the Apocalypse (Charly) 1985
- The Prophecies of Nostradamus (Blue Turtle) December 1987
- Mythology (Blue Turtle) February 1989
- The Dead Sea Scrolls (SPV) September 1991 (as the Famous B. Brothers)
- Blood, Sweat and Beers (GUN) July 1996
- Last Will and Testament (MBC) March 2009

=== Live albums ===
- Live Performances (Charly) January 1984
- In Private in Public (Charly) December 1986 (as the Famous Bollock Brothers)
- Live & Dangerous (MBC) March 2012
- 10 in a Row, Here We Go – Live at Coesfeld Fabrik (EmuBands), September 2013

=== Singles ===
- "One of the Lads" (Island) November 1979 (as 4" Be 2")
- "Frustration" (WEA) 27 June 1980 (as 4" Be 2")
- "The Bunker" (McDonald Lydon, re-released 1983 by Charly) October 1980
- "Good Old Arsenal (AFC)" November 1980 (as the Sex Bristols)
- "Why Won't Rangers Sign a Catholic?" (no label) 1980 (as Pope Paul and the Romans)
- "The Act Became Real" (McDonald and Lydon) February 1981
- "All of the Lads" (McDonald and Lydon) March 1981 (as 4" Be 2")
- "We'll Be There" (McDonald and Lydon) May 1981 (as Rabbie Burns + the Ticket Touts)
- "The Slow Removal of Vincent van Gogh's Left Ear" (Charly) October 1982
- "Dracs Back" (Magnet, re-released 1983 by Charly) 1982 (as Red Lipstique)
- "Oscar Wilde" (Charly) 1983 (as Red Lipstique)
- "Horror Movies" (Charly) March 1983 (as the B.B.s)
- "Are You Durty" (Charly) 1983 (as Jock McDonald's Indecent Exposure Show)
- "God Save the Queen" (Charly) July 1983 (as Michael Fagan and the Bollock Brothers)
- "Shame, Shame, Shame" (Charly Disco International) October 1983 (as Red Lipstique)
- "The Prince and the Showgirl" (InDisc) October 1984
- "Legend of the Snake" (Charly/Green Line) 1985 (as the Famous B. Brothers)
- "Dracs Back" (Charly) 1986 (as the Famous Bollock Brothers)
- "Faith Healer" (Charly) 1986 (as the Bollock Brothers)
- "Return of the Vampyre" (McDonald Bros Corp) 1986 (split 12" single with Sex Pistol)
- "Harley David (Play It Again Sam)" January 1987
- "God Created Woman" (Blue Turtle) January 1988
- "Brigitte Bardot" (Blue Turtle) January 1988
- "Don't Call Us, We Call You" (SPV) May 1992
- "My Way" (GUN) 1995
- "Where Is My Girl" (GUN) 1996
- "Cyber Polaroid" (MBC, mail order only) October 2005 (as the Bollock Brothers feat. Lolita)
- "The French Connection" feat. Le Hand of Le Frog (MBC) 2010

=== Compilation albums ===
- D Wing (UD, Japanese Bootleg) 1981 (as 4" Be 2")
- Bollock Brothers, Bollock Sisters (Konexion Records) 1986
- '77-'78-'79 (MBC Records) 1986
- Family Album (MBC Records) November 1986 (as The Lydons and The O'Donnells)
- 14 Carat Gold - The Best Of The Bollock Brothers (SPV Records) May 1993
- The Best Of The Bollocks (Charly Schallplatten) 1994
- Dancin' Masters (Past & Present) (MBC Records) 1994
- The Sex Pistols Vs. The Bollock Brothers (MBC Records) 1996 (split CD with Sex Pistols)
- What A Load Of Bollocks! (MBC Records) January 2000
- 25th Anniversary (MBC Records) August 2001
- Jesus Lives (MBC Records) October 2001
- Twice The Balls (Recall Records) August 2002
- Ladykillers (MBC Records) March 2007

=== VHS videos ===
- Home Video (MBC Films) 1986
- Live In Europe (MBC Films) 1987
- Home Video & Live In Europe 2xVHS Boxset (MBC Films)

== Bibliography ==
Further reading:

- Hämäläinen, Jyrki "Spider" (2020). Killing Joke: Are You Receiving?. Milton Keynes: New Haven Publishing Ltd. ISBN 978-1912587407.
