= The Antics Roadshow =

2011 film by Banksy

Title screenshot from the documentary.

The Antics Roadshow is an hour-long 2011 documentary film focused on iconic acts of activism and pranks.

== Production ==
The Antics Roadshow was produced and directed by the British street artist Banksy and the director/producer Jaimie D'Cruz and was narrated by Kathy Burke.

The name parodies the BBC Television series Antiques Roadshow.

== Featured artists and activists ==
Artist or activist	Known for
Seeds of Hope	Damaging a BAe Hawk warplane at the British Aerospace Warton Aerodrome site near Preston, England, in 1996.
Igor Vamos; Jacques Servin	Their work as The Yes Men, a culture jamming activist duo.
Mark Roberts	Streaking at major events, especially sporting events.
Michael Fagan	Breaking into Buckingham Palace; known as the Michael Fagan incident.
Noël Godin	Pieing celebrities and politicians.
Princess Hijab	Painting hijabs on models in fashion industry advertisements.
Rémi Gaillard	Various well-publicised pranks.
Joey Skaggs	Performs elaborate media hoaxes that blend satire, social commentary and performance art.
Charlie Todd	Founder of Improv Everywhere.

== Broadcasts ==
Country	Year	Channel
United Kingdom	2011	Channel 4
Australia	2013	SBS Two

== See also ==
- List of works by Banksy
