= Lucía Pérez =

Spanish singer

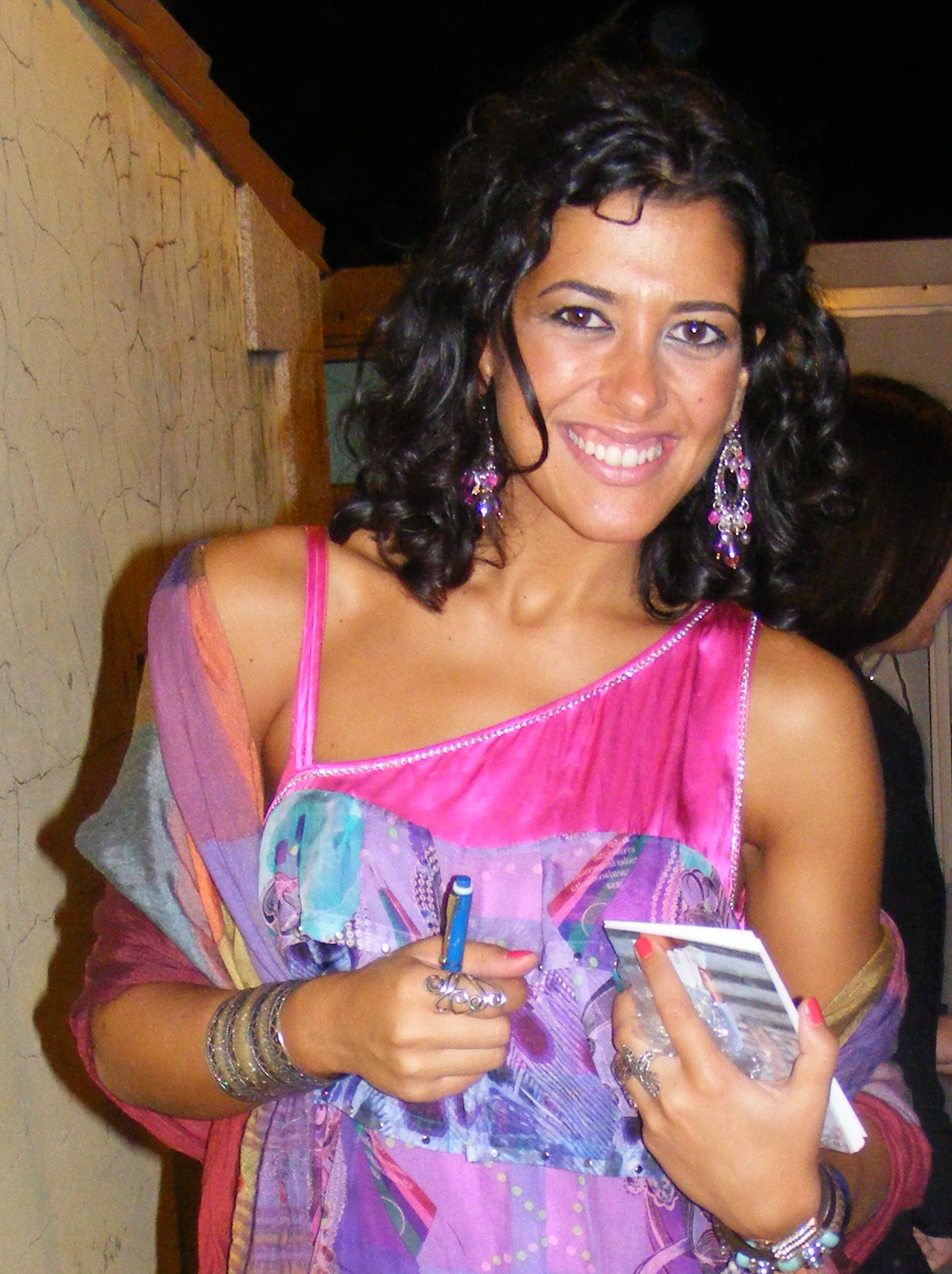
- Lucía Pérez (2013)

Background information
- Born: Lucía Pérez Vizcaíno; 5 July 1985 (age 41); O Incio, Galicia, Spain
- Genres: Pop
- Occupation: Singer
- Years active: 2003–present
- Labels: Zouma Records (2003-2004); Letras y Musas (2005–2011, c. 2014-); Warner Music Spain (2011-c.2013)
- Website: https://www.luciaperez.es/

Lucía Pérez Vizcaíno (Spanish pronunciation: [luθi.a peɾeθ]; born 5 July 1985 in O Incio, Lugo, Galicia) is a Spanish singer who represented her country in the Eurovision Song Contest 2011 in Germany with the song "Que me quiten lo bailao".

== Career ==
In 2002, at 17, Lucía Pérez won the talent show for amateur singers Canteira de Cantareiros, on the regional Galician television (TVG). A year later she published her first album, Amores y amores, which was awarded the Galician Gold Record certification for its sales.

In 2005, she received the Galician Soloist Pop Album award. Later that year, she represented Spain in the Viña del Mar International Song Festival in Chile and she placed second in the international competition with the song "Qué haría contigo". Also in 2005, her song "Amarás Miña Terra" was nominated for Best Song in Galician at the Spanish Music Awards.

In 2008, her third album, Volar por los tejados, was released both in Spain and Chile, where she toured extensively. In 2009, she took part in the Viña del Mar Festival for a second time. In 2010, she released her fourth album, Dígocho en galego which is entirely in Galician language.

In 2011, Lucía took part in the Spanish selection process for the Eurovision Song Contest 2011, Destino Eurovisión, and on 18 February, she won the final with the song "Que me quiten lo bailao".

In March 2011, following her selection as the Spanish Eurovision entrant, Lucía was signed to Warner Music to release her fifth album, Cruzo los dedos, in April 2011. Most of the songs are Spanish-language version of songs from Dígocho en galego, though the last song on the album, Adiós rios, adiós fontes was retained in Galician.

At the Eurovision Song Contest 2011 final that took place in Düsseldorf, Germany on 14 May she placed 23rd. However, she was 16th in the separate televoting result.

On 22 June 2014, Pérez released her sixth studio album, Quitapenas. In May 2018, Pérez released her seventh studio album Quince soles, which includes collaborations with Chenoa, Rosa Cedrón and Chema Purón.

== Discography ==
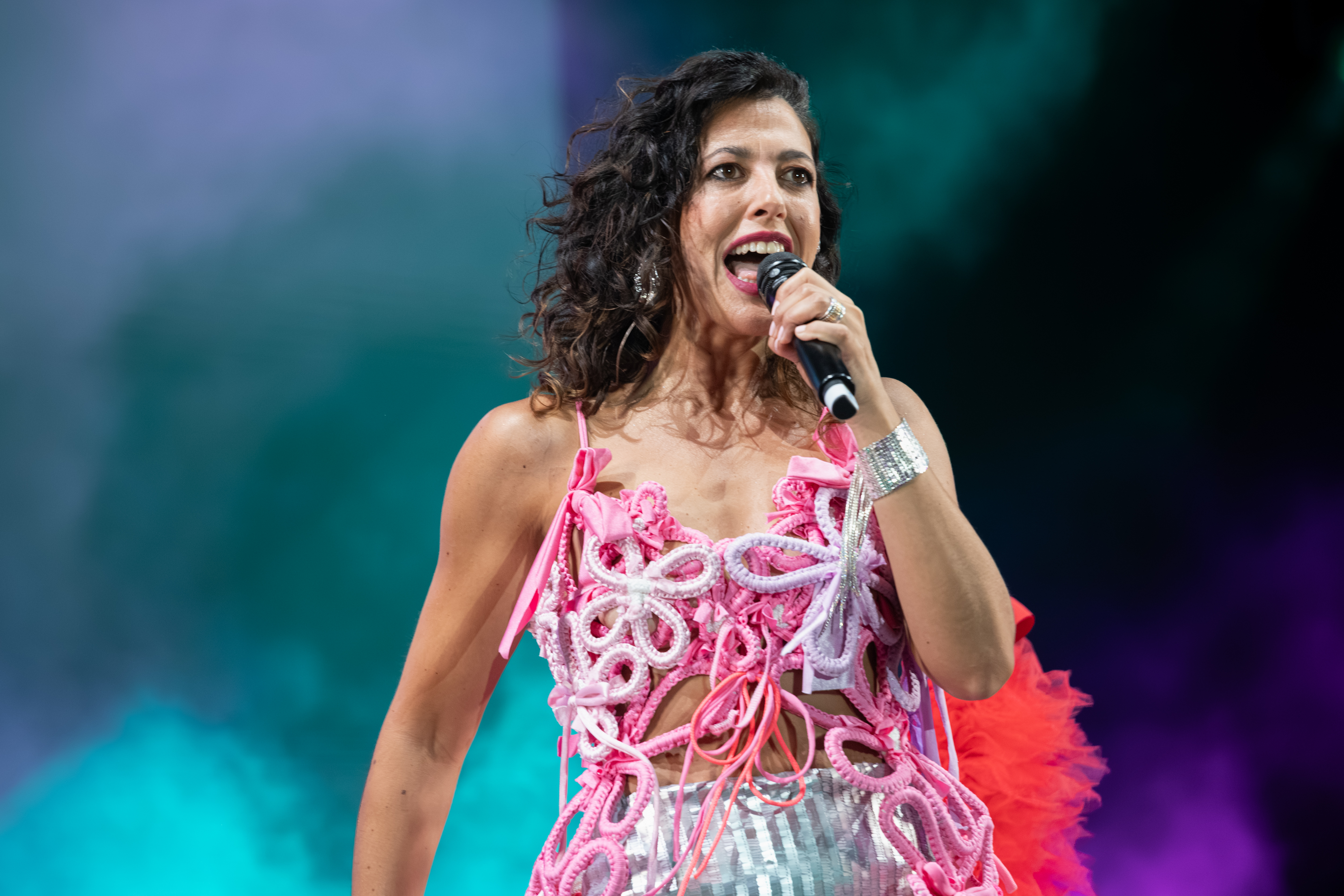
Lucía Pérez performing at Madrid Pride, July 2026

=== Albums ===
Year	Title	Chart positions
Year	Title	SPA
2003	Amores y amores: 1st Studio Album; Label: Zouma Records	—
2006	El tiempo dirá	—
2009	Volar por los tejados	—
2010	Dígocho en galego	—
2011	Cruzo los dedos	31
2014	Quitapenas	—
2018	Quince soles	—

=== Singles ===
Year	Single	Chart position	Album
Year	Single	SPA	Album
2011	"Que me quiten lo bailao"	19	Cruzo los dedos

Preceded by Daniel Diges with Algo pequeñito	Spain in the Eurovision Song Contest; 2011	Succeeded by Pastora Soler with Quédate conmigo
