= A Buena Hora =

Studio album by Sergio Dalma
- Released: 2008
- Label: Universal Music Spain

Sergio Dalma chronology
Todo Lo Que Quieres (2005)	A Buena Hora (2008)	Trece (2010)

A Buena Hora (At Good Time) is the 14th studio album from the Spanish singer Sergio Dalma, released by Universal Music Spain in 2008.

== Track listing ==
No.	Title	Writer(s)	Length
1.	"A buena hora"	Luca Germini, José Javier Suárez Ortiz	3:41
2.	"Después"	Leonel García	3:37
3.	"Morir de amores"	José Antonio Ogara, Luis Manuel Ruiz	3:35
4.	"Sólo si tú quieres"	Ruiz	3:17
5.	"Cenizas"	Jorge Fernández Ojea, Alma Maria Rodríguez Sánchez	3:50
6.	"Maravillosa criatura"	Gianna Nannini, Redeghieri	3:34
7.	"Silencio perfecto"	Ogara, Ruiz	3:56
8.	"Nada vale nada"	Alfredo Chacón	3:52
9.	"Suena"	Ogara, Ruiz	3:52
10.	"El río de los peces traviesos"	Ogara, Ruiz	3:43
11.	"Amantes en la estratosfera"	Ogara, Ruiz	4:02
12.	"Por amor"	Pablo Cebrián, Ismael Guijarro, Mercedes Gónzalez	4:39

== Personnel ==
- Niall Acott – recording
- Jacobo Calderón – synthesizer, piano, arranger, programming, producer
- Chris Cameron – piano, organ
- Sergio Dalma – vocals
- David Daniels – cello
- Javier Garza – mixing
- Felipe Guevara – recording, Mixing
- Juan Guevara – electric guitar
- Sebastián Krys – arranger, programming, producer, recording
- Lee Levin – Bateria, recording
- Perry Mason – violin
- Jeremy Murphy – assistant engineer
- José Luis Pagán – arranger, programming
- Carmen Paris – vocals
- John Parsons – guitar
- José Carlos Rico – saw
- Rafa Sañudo – graphic design
- Emlyn Singleton – violin
- Oscar Vinader – recording, Mixing
- Bruce White – viola

== Charts ==
Chart	Peak position	Cert.	Sales
Promusicae Spanish Albums Chart	1	Platinum	+80,000
