= Belén Arjona =

Spanish singer and Songwriter

- Also known as: Bel Arjona
- Born: Belén Arjona García; 10 May 1981 (age 44)
- Origin: Madrid, Spain
- Genres: Latin pop, pop, rock en Español, pop-rock, songwriter pop, rock, alternative, folk
- Occupation: Singer songwriter
- Instrument: Guitar vocals
- Years active: 2003–present
- Labels: Warner Music (2003–2006); Tool-Caes (2007–2008) one10music (2009.); Donband (2019, -)
- Website: www.belenarjona.com

Bel Arjona, born on 10 May 1981 in Madrid, is a Spanish singer and Songwriter. Best known is Spain as Belén Arjona, the singer was nominated in 2006 the Latin Grammy Awards for Best Rock Solo Vocal Album.

== Biography ==
Bel Arjona (known in Spain as Belen Arjona) is a Spanish singer and songwriter, Latin Grammy Awards nominee for Best Rock Solo Vocal Album in 2006.

The singer had a prominent career in the Spanish market until 2008, followed by a purposeful industry hiatus where side projects kept developed nevertheless.

The singer's most prominent collaborations include bands such as Maná and Efecto Mariposa.

== Discography ==
=== Álbumes ===
- 2003: O te mueves o caducas
- 2004: O te mueves o caducas (Edición especial)
- 2005: Infinito (álbum de Belén Arjona)
- 2008: Alas en mis pies
- 2019: En grabación

=== Singles ===
Año	Canción	Álbum
2003	"O te mueves o caducas"	O te mueves o caducas
2003	"Me voy de fiesta"	O te mueves o caducas
2003	"Si no estás"	O te mueves o caducas
2003	"Sangre en la nevera"	O te mueves o caducas
2004	"Vivir sin aire" (dúo con Fher Olvera de Maná)	O te mueves o caducas (Edición especial)
2005	"Infinito"	Infinito
2005	"No habrá más perdón"	Infinito
2006	"Sola otra vez"	Infinito
2007	"La sombra"	Alas en mis pies
2008	"Tú no te das cuenta"	Alas en mis pies
2011	"We belong here"	Best Not to Say It
2019	En grabación	TBD

=== Collaborations ===
Año	Título	Álbum
2002	Coros en álbum de Garret Wall	Gravity
2004	"Latido urbano" (Varios artistas)	Tony Aguilar y amigos
2005	"La noche en que te fuiste"	Que te vaya bonito: un tributo a México
2006	"Y serás canción" (Varios artistas)	Y serás canción: homenaje a Big Simon
2006	"Everest" (Síntesis y Belén Arjona)	Transparente
2007	"Que más da" (Efecto Mariposa y Belén Arjona)	Vivo en vivo
2007	"Invencible" (Moebio y Belén Arjona)	Moebio
2008	"Te perdí" (Iguana Tango y Belén Arjona)	En vivo... y coleando
2008	"Qué vamos a Hacer" (Skizoo y Belén Arjona)	La cara oculta
2008	" BSO"	La señora

== Videoclips ==
Año	Canción
2003	"O te mueves o caducas"
2003	"Me voy de fiesta"
2003	"Si no estás"
2003	"Sangre en la nevera"
2004	"Vivir sin aire"
2005	"Infinito"
2005	"No habrá más perdón"
2006	"Sola otra vez"
2007	"La Sombra"
2008	"Tú no te das cuenta"
2011	"We Belong Here"
2019	En grabación.

== DVD ==
- 2004: O te mueves o caducas (Edición Especial)

== Links ==
- Website Oficial
- Instagram
