= Algo pequeñito =

2010 song by Daniel Diges

Single by Daniel Diges

from the album Daniel Diges
- Language: Spanish
- Released: 13 April 2010
- Recorded: 2010
- Genre: Pop; waltz
- Length: 2:59
- Label: Warner Music Spain
- Songwriter(s): Jesús Cañadilla; Luis Miguel de la Varga; Alberto Collado; Daniel Diges
- Producer(s): Alejandro de Pinedo

Daniel Diges singles chronology
"Algo pequeñito" (2010)	"Quédate Conmigo" (2010)

Music video
- "Algo pequeñito" on YouTube

Eurovision Song Contest 2010 entry
- Country: Spain
- Artist(s): Daniel Diges
- Language: Spanish
- Composer(s): Jesús Cañadilla; Luis Miguel de la Varga; Alberto Collado; Daniel Diges
- Lyricist(s): Jesús Cañadilla; Luis Miguel de la Varga; Alberto Collado; Daniel Diges

Finals performance
- Final result: 15th
- Final points: 68

Entry chronology
- ◄ "La noche es para mí" (2009)
- "Que me quiten lo bailao" (2011) ►

Official performance video
- "Algo pequeñito" (final) on YouTube

"Algo pequeñito" (Spanish pronunciation: [ˈalɣo pekeˈɲito], "Something Tiny") is a song recorded by Spanish singer Daniel Diges, written by Jesús Cañadilla, Luis Miguel de la Varga, Alberto Jodar, and Diges himself. It represented Spain in the Eurovision Song Contest 2010, placing fifteenth.

== Background ==
=== Conception ===
"Algo pequeñito" is the second song ever written by its author, Jesús Cañadilla, a fan of the Eurovision Song Contest. He had previously written the song "Sumando puntos" to submit it to the 2009 Spanish national final, sung by himself under the stage name Bayarte. Once he had written "Algo pequeñito", which is based on the classic waltz rhythm, he contacted several potential performers without luck. He eventually contacted musical theater actor Daniel Diges through a friend and he liked the song.

On 5 January 2010, seven days before the closing date for submissions for the 2010 Spanish national final, Diges flew from Tenerife, where he was on tour with the musical Mamma Mia!, to Madrid to record the song. Alejandro de Pinedo took charge of the musical production.

=== Selection ===
On 22 February 2010, "Algo pequeñito" performed by Daniel Diges competed in Eurovisión: Destino Oslo, the national final organized by Radiotelevisión Española (RTVE), and aired on La 1 of Televisión Española, to select their song and performer for the 55th edition of the Eurovision Song Contest. The song won the competition so it became the Spanish entry for the contest.

Once the song was chosen, a mastered version was made public on 11 March 2010. In the mastered version, computer sounds were replaced by real instruments and Diges gave the song a more rock influence with his vocal performance, mirroring his live performance at the national final. On 13 April 2010 the song was made available for digital download on iTunes.

=== Music video ===
On 12–14 March 2010, a music video for "Algo pequeñito" was shot by director Santiago Tabernero at outdoor and indoor locations in Madrid. The video, released on 19 March, is set in an abandoned circus that comes back to life with the song, and depicts Diges as the circus master.

=== Eurovision ===
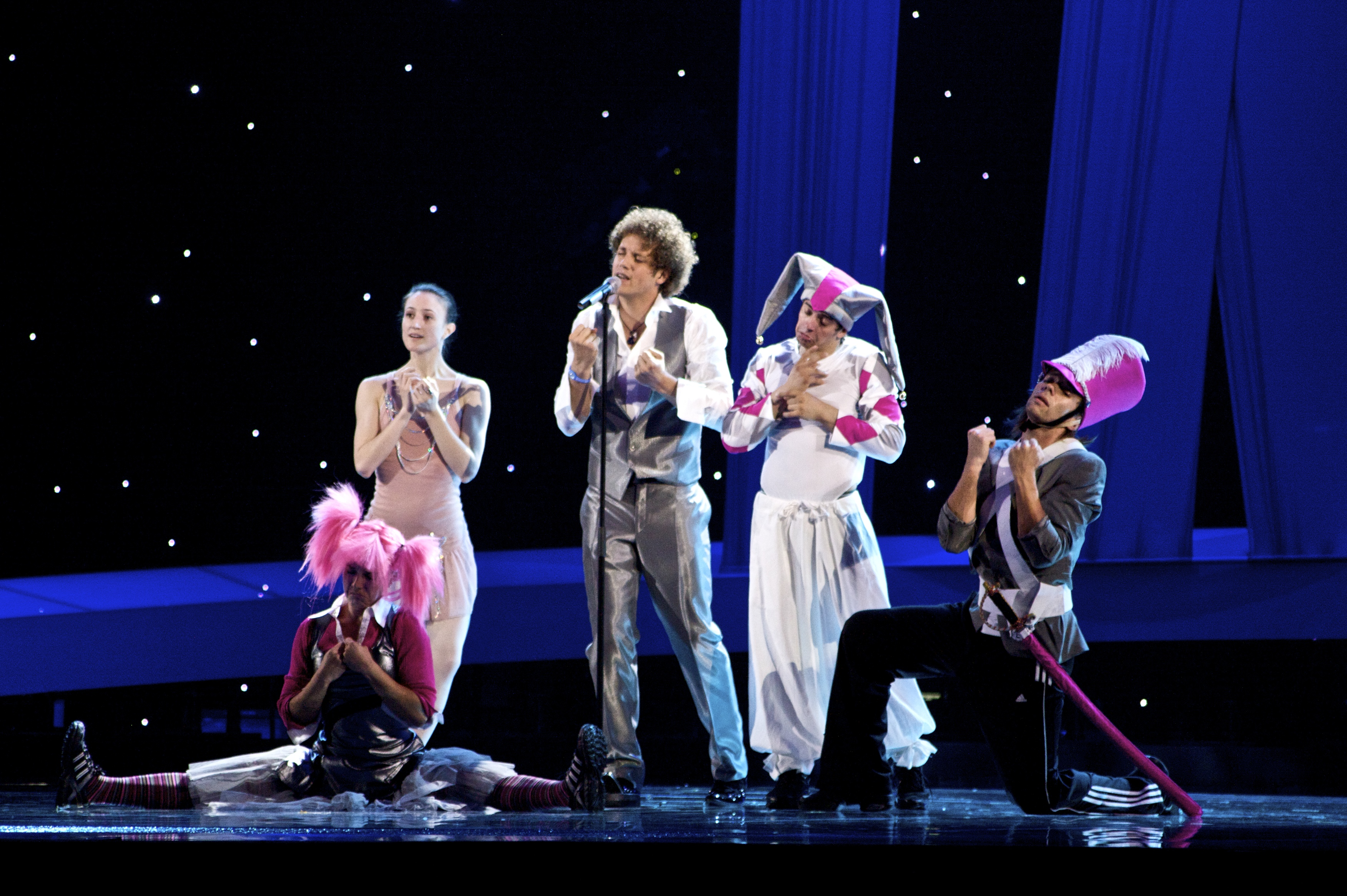
Diges and his dancers during his first rehearsals at the Eurovision Song Contest 2010

On 29 May 2010, the Eurovision Song Contest grand final was held at the Telenor Arena in Oslo hosted by Norsk rikskringkasting (NRK), and broadcast live throughout the continent. Diges performed "Algo pequeñito" second on the night following Azerbaijan's "Drip Drop" by Safura and preceding Norway's "My Heart Is Yours" by Didrik Solli-Tangen.

The performance was disturbed as a Catalan pitch invader named Jaume Marquet Cot –better known as Jimmy Jump– stormed the stage. Diges continued singing as Marquet, wearing a barretina, joined in with the choreographed routine and then ran away when security personnel entered the stage for him. In accordance with the contest rules, Diges was allowed to perform the song again after the last song was performed.

At the close of voting, "Algo pequeñito" received 68 points, placing fifteenth in a field of twenty-five.

=== Aftermath ===
Daniel Diges' first album, self-titled Daniel Diges released on 18 May 2010, includes the mastered Eurovision version of the song and an alternative swing-jazz version.

== Chart history ==
=== Weekly charts ===
Chart (2010)	Peak position
Spain (PROMUSICAE)	5

== Legacy ==
=== Cover versions ===
- In 2011, Anne-Marie David, winner of the Eurovision Song Contest 1973, covered the song with most lyrics in French.

=== Impersonations ===
- In the second episode of the eleventh season of Tu cara me suena aired on 19 April 2024 on Antena 3, Miguel Lago impersonated Daniel Diges singing –in duo with him– "Algo pequeñito" replicating his performance at Eurovision.
