= Que me quiten lo bailao =

2011 song by Lucía Pérez

Single by Lucía Pérez

from the album Cruzo los dedos
- Language: Spanish
- Released: 25 March 2011
- Recorded: 2010
- Genre: Pop
- Length: 2:53
- Label: Warner Music Spain
- Songwriter: Rafael Artesero
- Producer: Chema Purón

Music video
- "Que me quiten lo bailao" on YouTube

Eurovision Song Contest 2011 entry
- Country: Spain
- Artist: Lucía Pérez
- Language: Spanish
- Composer: Rafael Artesero
- Lyricist: Rafael Artesero

Finals performance
- Final result: 23rd
- Final points: 50

Entry chronology
- ◄ "Algo pequeñito" (2010)
- "Quédate conmigo" (2012) ►

Official performance video
- "Que me quiten lo bailao" (final) on YouTube

"Que me quiten lo bailao" (Spanish pronunciation: [ke me ˈkiten lo βajˈlao], literally "Let them take away from me what I've danced", a colloquialism that means "They can't take the fun I've had away from me") is a song recorded by Spanish singer Lucía Pérez, written by Rafael Artesero. It was released as a digital download on 25 March 2011 as the first single from her fifth studio album Cruzo los dedos. It represented Spain in the Eurovision Song Contest 2011, placing twenty-third.

== Background ==
=== Conception ===
The song was written and composed by Rafael Artesero originally in English as "Weeping for Joy". Artero had already penned "La mirada interior" and "Sense tu", songs that represented Andorra in Eurovision in the 2005 and 2006 contests respectively, as well as several entries for different Spanish national finals.

=== Eurovision ===
==== Selection ====
In late 2010, Radiotelevisión Española (RTVE) opened two separate submission periods, for artists to submit their applications and songwriters to submit original songs, to compete in the national selection Destino Eurovisión that it was organizing to choose its song and performer for the 56th edition of the Eurovision Song Contest. Artero initially submitted the song in English, but RTVE asked him to translate it into Spanish, which he did under the title "Que me quiten lo bailao". Lucía Pérez also submitted her application as performer. Both were qualified for the televised competition.

Between 28 January and 18 February 2011 a televised competition was aired on La 1 of Televisión Española. Each heat featured the artists covering classic Eurovision songs, until three of them made it to the final, where they were assigned three original songs each. Lucía reached the final and was assigned "Que me quiten lo bailao", "Abrázame", and "C'est la vie! It's Alright!". "Que me quiten lo bailao" won the competition, with 68% of the total votes by the audience, so it became the Spanish entry for the Eurovision Song Contest 2011. Lucía admitted that it was not the song she preferred for not being the style she was used to perform.

==== Release ====
After the song was chosen, Lucía recorded it in studio with new arrangements by Chema Purón, her producer since 2002 and producer and composer of "Vuelve conmigo" and "Colgado de un sueño" who had participated in Eurovision for Spain in 1995 and 2000 respectively. The song was given a different tonality with the inclusion of Galician folk instruments –Lucía is from Galicia– and some of the lyrics were modified. This version of the song also changes key towards the end, and the section where Lucía sings 'para churu churu...' was cut. The song was released as a digital download on 25 March 2011.

==== Music video ====
The official music video was filmed on 5 March 2011 in Sitges (Barcelona), during its renowned Carnival celebrations. Fans were invited to join the filming in disguise. The video premiered on RTVE's Eurovision website on 11 March 2011.

==== Eurovision final ====
On 14 May 2011, the grand final of the Eurovision Song Contest was held at the Düsseldorf Arena in Düsseldorf hosted by Arbeitsgemeinschaft Rundfunkanstalten Deutschland (ARD) and Norddeutscher Rundfunk (NDR) and broadcast live throughout the continent. Lucía Pérez performed "Que me quiten lo bailao" twenty-second on the night, following Iceland's "Coming Home" by Sjonni's Friends and preceding Ukraine's "Angel" by Mika Newton.

At the close of voting, it had received 50 points, placing twenty-third in a field of twenty-five. Televoters liked the song better than professional jurors: if only televoting results had been considered, it would have reached sixteenth place, whereas it was second-to-last in the national juries' voting results.

=== Aftermath ===
The song was included in Lucía's fifth studio album Cruzo los dedos released on 12 April 2011. The recording of an English version under the title "I'm over the moon" was announced but did not come to fruition. A Galician language version, titled "Que me quiten o bailao", was first performed by Lucía in a special program aired on Televisión de Galicia (TVG) on 25 July 2011 to celebrate the Day of Galician Fatherland.

== Chart history ==
=== Weekly charts ===
| Chart (2011) | Peak position |
|---|---|
| Spain (Promusicae) | 19 |
