= Sergio Dalma =

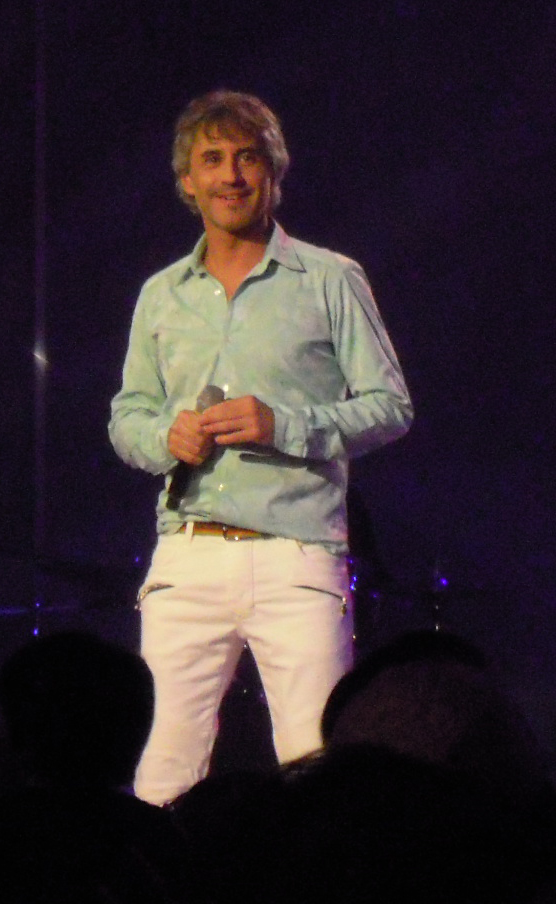
- Sergio Dalma in 2011

Background information
- Born: Josep Sergi Capdevila Querol; 28 September 1964 (age 61); Sabadell, Catalonia, Spain
- Occupation: Singer

Josep Sergi Capdevila Querol (born 28 September 1964), professionally known as Sergio Dalma, is a Spanish singer. He is one of Spain's best-selling recording artists, having topped Spain's official Productores de Música de España national album chart nine times, including an unbroken string of five number one albums between 2008 and 2013.

== Professional career ==
Sergio Dalma started his career singing in bands and performing in choral groups until he won the TV program "Gent d'aqui", in the Catalan station of Televisión Española, which won him a regular contract to sing in the Shadows night-club in Barcelona. Dalma signed with the record company Horus.

In 1989, Sergio Dalma released his first album, Esa Chica es Mía. The title song was released as his first single. The song, a pop-rock ballad, became a success in Ibero-America, reaching the charts in Spain, Mexico, Chile, Argentina and other Latin American countries. The album was certified Platinum in Spain and other countries in 1990.

Sintiéndonos la Piel followed in 1991. That same year, he was chosen to represent Spain in the Eurovision Song Contest 1991 in Rome with the song "Bailar pegados." He finished in fourth place, and the single proved to be his international breakthrough and introduced him to Hispanic audiences in the United States, where the song peaked at No. 6 on the U.S. Hot Latin Tracks chart in Billboard. It also became a number one hit in several countries of Ibero-America. Another single from the album, "Como Me Gusta," became his second Top 10 hit on the U.S. Hot Latin Tracks list.

The following year, he released Adivina, which reached No. 1 in the Spanish charts and featured the hit single "Ave Lucía". He later recorded for Polygram and Universal. "Galilea" (1991), "Solo Para Ti" (No. 10 on the U.S. Hot Latin Tracks in Billboard in 1994), "Esta Noche Es Larga Si No Estas" (1998), "Todo Lo Que Quieres" (2005), "El Mundo" (No. 10 in Spain in 2011) and "Yo No Te Pido La Luna" (2011) are among his many hit singles. His 2010 album, Via Dalma, became one of the biggest hits in his career, spending 10 weeks at No. 1 in Spain and earning six-times platinum certification. His 2011 followup, Via Dalma II, also reached No. 1 and was certified quadruple platinum. To promote the latter disc, Dalma hosted an RTVE special called Via Dalma that aired in December 2011. His guests included Laura Pausini, Nek, Pablo Alborán, Umberto Tozzi, Chenoa and Pastora Soler. Upon its first week in release, Dalma's 2013 album, Cadore 33, topped the chart in Spain. It thus became Dalma's fifth consecutive album to reach No. 1 on the national chart, excluding compilations. It featured two hit singles: "Si Te Vas" (No. 21 in Spain) and "Recuerdo Crónico" (No. 49 in Spain).

On 20 September 2014 he celebrated the 25th anniversary of his recording career with a concert at the Plaza del Toros in Madrid. The show was filmed for DVD release and recorded for a CD. Guest stars included Nek, Vanesa Martín and Pablo Alborán. Yo Estuve Allí, A CD/DVD of the concert was released on 18 November 2014. It debuted on the Spanish chart at No. 4 during the week of 17–23 November 2014. The same week, Cadore 33 returned to the chart at No. 8, giving Dalma two albums simultaneously in the Top 10.

In September 2015 the single "Tú y Yo" was released in Spain and reached No. 14 on the national charts. It was followed in November by the album Dalma, which debuted at No. 2 on the national chart.

In October 2017, Via Dalma III, his third collection of Italian songs performed in Spanish, was released and reached No. 1 in Spain. Ultimately, the disc spent 58 weeks on the national chart.

In November 2018, Dalma announced via social media that he had parted ways with label Warner Music Group after eight years. In February 2019, Dalma announced that he had signed with the Spanish division of Sony Music for recording.

Dalma has performed in Spanish throughout his career, but has also recorded in Catalan, Italian, English and French.

== Personal life ==
Sergio Dalma married Maribel Sanz on 22 February 1994. His only child, Sergi Capdevila, was born on 18 August 1995. The couple later divorced, and Maribel became, for a while, a regular of celebrity magazines and TV programs. In 2014, mother and son appeared on the second season of the Telecinco show ¡Mira Quién Salta!, a celebrity diving program. Capdevila won the program. After the victory, he claimed in an interview that he hadn't spoken with Dalma in five months. Dalma declined to comment on his son's charges.

== Discography ==
- Esa Chica es Mía (Horus, 1989)
- Sintiéndonos la Piel (Horus, 1991) No. 1 Spain; No. 24 US Latin Pop Albums
- Adivina (Horus 1992) No. 1 Spain
- Sólo Para Ti (Polygram, 1994) No. 6 Spain
- Cuerpo a Cuerpo (Polygram, 1995) No. 4 Spain
- En Concierto (Polygram, 1996) No. 24 Spain
- Historias Normales (Polygram, 1998) No. 4 Spain
- Nueva Vida (Universal, 2001) No. 12 Spain
- De Otro Color (Universal, 2003)#2 Spain
- Todo Lo Que Quieres (Universal, 2005) No. 4 Spain
- A Buena Hora (Universal, 2008) No. 1 Spain, Platinum
- Trece (Universal, 2010) No. 1 Spain, Platinum
- Via Dalma (Warner, 2010) No. 1 Spain, 6× Platinum
- Via Dalma II (Warner, 2011) No. 1 Spain, 4× Platinum
- Cadore 33 (Warner, 2013) No. 1 Spain, Platinum
- Yo Estuve Allí (Warner, 2014) No. 4 Spain
- Dalma (Warner, 2015) No. 2 Spain
- Via Dalma III (Warner, 2017) No. 1 Spain
- Alegría (Warner, 2015) No. 2 Spain
- Sonrie porque estás en la foto (Warner, 2023) No.1 Spain
- Ritorno a Via Dalma (Warner, 2025)

=== Compilations ===
- De Colección (Polygram, 1994)
- Lo Mejor de Sergio Dalma 1989–2004 (Universal, 2004) No. 1 Spain
- Todo Via Dalma (Warner, 2012) No. 19 Spain
- T'estimo^{[A]} (Universal, 2013) No. 23 Spain

Notes

- A. T'estimo is a collection of Dalma's Catalan-language recordings.

Preceded by Azúcar Moreno with "Bandido"	Spain in the Eurovision Song Contest; 1991	Succeeded by Serafín Zubiri with "Todo esto es la música"
