= Estonia in the Eurovision Song Contest 2011 =

- Eurovision Song Contest 2011
- Participating broadcaster: Eesti Rahvusringhääling (ERR)
- Country: Estonia
- Selection process: Eesti Laul 2011
- Selection date: 26 February 2011

Competing entry
- Song: "Rockefeller Street"
- Artist: Getter Jaani
- Songwriters: Sven Lõhmus

Placement
- Semi-final result: Qualified (9th, 60 points)
- Final result: 24th, 44 points

Participation chronology

Estonia was represented at the Eurovision Song Contest 2011 with the song "Rockefeller Street" written by Sven Lõhmus. The song was performed by Getter Jaani. The Estonian broadcaster Eesti Rahvusringhääling (ERR) organised the national final Eesti Laul 2011 in order to select the Estonian entry for the 2011 contest in Düsseldorf, Germany. The national final consisted of three shows: two semi-finals and a final. Ten songs competed in each semi-final and the top five from each semi-final as determined by a jury panel and public vote qualified to the final. In the final, the winner was selected over two rounds of voting. In the first round, a jury panel and a public vote selected the top two to qualify to the superfinal. In the superfinal, "Rockefeller Street" performed by Getter Jaani was selected as the winner entirely by a public vote.

Estonia was drawn to compete in the second semi-final of the Eurovision Song Contest which took place on 12 May 2011. Performing during the show in position 15, "Rockefeller Street" was announced among the top 10 entries of the second semi-final and therefore qualified to compete in the final on 14 May. It was later revealed that Estonia placed ninth out of the 19 participating countries in the semi-final with 60 points. In the final, Estonia performed in position 8 and placed twenty-fourth out of the 25 participating countries, scoring 44 points.

== Background ==
Prior to the 2011 contest, Estonia had participated in the Eurovision Song Contest sixteen times since its first entry in 1994, winning the contest on one occasion in 2001 with the song "Everybody" performed by Tanel Padar, Dave Benton and 2XL. Following the introduction of semi-finals for the 2004, Estonia has, to this point, managed to qualify to the final on two occasions. In 2010, "Siren" performed by Malcolm Lincoln failed to qualify Estonia to the final where the song placed fourteenth in the semi-final.

The Estonian national broadcaster, Eesti Rahvusringhääling (ERR), broadcasts the event within Estonia and organises the selection process for the nation's entry. Since their debut, the Estonian broadcaster has organised national finals that feature a competition among multiple artists and songs in order to select Estonia's entry for the Eurovision Song Contest. The Eesti Laul competition has been organised since 2009 in order to select Estonia's entry and on 19 October 2010, ERR announced the organisation of Eesti Laul 2011 in order to select the nation's 2011 entry.

== Before Eurovision ==
=== Eesti Laul 2011 ===
Logo of Eesti Laul 2011

Eesti Laul 2011 was the third edition of the Estonian national selection Eesti Laul, which selected Estonia's entry for the Eurovision Song Contest 2011. The competition consisted of twenty entries competing in two semi-finals on 12 and 19 February 2011 leading to a ten-song final on 26 February 2011. All three shows were broadcast on Eesti Televisioon (ETV) as well as streamed online at the broadcaster's official website err.ee. The final was also broadcast via radio on Raadio 2 with commentary by Madis Aesma and Indrek Vaheoja as well as streamed online at the official Eurovision Song Contest website eurovision.tv.

==== Format ====
The format of the competition included two semi-finals on 12 and 19 February 2011 and a final on 26 February 2011. Ten songs competed in each semi-final and the top five from each semi-final qualified to complete the ten song lineup in the final. The results of the semi-finals was determined by the 50/50 combination of votes from a professional jury and public televoting. The winning song in the final was selected over two rounds of voting: the first round results selected the top three songs via the 50/50 combination of jury and public voting, while the second round (superfinal) determined the winner solely by public televoting.

==== Competing entries ====
On 19 October 2010, ERR opened the submission period for artists and composers to submit their entries up until 13 December 2010. All artists and composers were required to have Estonian citizenship or be a permanent resident of Estonia. 140 submissions were received by the deadline. An 11-member jury panel selected 20 semi-finalists from the submissions and the selected songs were announced during the ETV entertainment program Ringvaade on 16 December 2010. The selection jury consisted of Toomas Puna (Raadio Sky+ program director), Owe Petersell (Raadio Elmar chief editor), Erik Morna (Raadio 2 head of music), Siim Nestor (music critic), Valner Valme (music critic), Kaupo Karelson (television producer), Ingrid Kohtla (Tallinn Music Week organiser), Kristo Rajasaare (Rabarocki and Tallinn Music Week organizer), Tauno Aints (composer), Koit Raudsepp (Raadio 2 presenter) and Hannaliisa Uusma (musician).

Ithaka Maria, Mimicry, Jaan Pehk (Orelipoiss), Rolf Junior, Stig Rästa (lead singer of Outloudz) and Tiiu Kiik have all competed in previous editions of Eesti Laul. In December 2010, "Meeting the Wolf", written by Janne Saar and Carola Madis and to have been performed by Janne Saar, and "Ilusad inimesed", written by Andero Nimmer, Indrek Ups, Jarek Kasar and Fredy Schmidt and to have been performed by Laika Virgin feat. Fredy Schmidt, were disqualified from the competition due to the songs being published before 1 September 2010 and replaced with the songs "Second Chance" performed by Tiiu Kiik and "Unemati" performed by Meister ja Mari, respectively. On 15 February 2011, "Jagatud öö", written by Rein Rannap and Indrek Hirv and to have been performed by Uku Suviste, was disqualified due to its lyrics being used in another song released in 2004.

Artist	Song	Songwriter(s)
Ans. Andur	"Lapsed ja lennukid"	Madis Aesma, Mihkel Kirss, Gert Pajuväli, Madis Kriss
Elmayonesa	"Kes ei tantsi, on politsei"	Nicolas Behler, Nora Reitel, Helen Heinmäe
Getter Jaani	"Rockefeller Street"	Sven Lõhmus
Ithaka Maria	"Hopa'pa-rei!"	Ithaka Maria Rahula, Peeter Pruuli
Jana Kask	"Don't Want Anything"	Jakko Maltis, Jana Kask
Kait Tamra	"Lubadus"	Kait Tamra
Marilyn Jurman and Karl Kanter	"Veel on aega"	Marilyn Jurman, Karl Kanter
Meister ja Mari	"Unemati"	Mari Meentalo
MID	"Smile"	Markus Robam
Mimicry	"The Storm"	Paul Lepasson, Timmo Linnas, Kene Vernik, Jaanus Telvar
Noorkuu	"Be My Saturday Night"	Mart Vainu
Outloudz	"I Wanna Meet Bob Dylan"	Stig Rästa, Fred Krieger
Orelipoiss	"Valss"	Jaan Pehk
Rolf Junior	"All & Now"	Rolf Roosalu, Liis Lass
Shirubi Ikazuchi	"St. Cabah"	Silvi Pilt
Sofia Rubina	"My Melody"	Sofia Rubina, Talis Paide
Sõpruse Puiestee and Merili Varik	"Rahu, ainult rahu"	Allan Vainola, Mait Vaik
Tiiu Kiik	"Second Chance"	Tiiu Kiik
Victoria	"Baby Had You"	Viktoriya Suslova, Sten Pulkkanen

==== Semi-finals ====
The two semi-finals took place on 12 and 19 February 2011 at the ERR studios in Tallinn, hosted by Piret Järvis and Lenna Kuurmaa. In each semi-final nine or ten songs competed for five spots in the final with the outcome decided upon by the combination of the votes from a jury panel and a public televote which registered 22,499 votes in the first semi-final and 13,070 votes in the second semi-final. The jury panel that voted in the semi-finals consisted of Tõnis Kahu, Valner Valme, Eda-Ines Etti, Owe Petersell, Olav Osolin, Mare Väljataga, Birgit Õigemeel, Tauno Aints, Leen Kadakas, Karel Kattai and Raul Vaigla.

Semi-final 1 – 12 February 2011
R/O	Artist	Song	Jury	Televote		Total	Place
R/O	Artist	Song	Jury	Votes	Points	Total	Place
1	Marilyn Jurman and Karl Kanter	"Veel on aega"	1	603	2	3	10
2	Elmayonesa	"Kes ei tantsi, on politsei"	2	2,325	6	8	7
3	Victoria	"Baby Had You"	8	1,939	4	12	5
4	Noorkuu	"Be My Saturday Night"	5	2,381	7	12	3
5	Jana Kask	"Don't Want Anything"	7	2,222	5	12	4
6	Kait Tamra	"Lubadus"	4	1,359	3	7	8
7	Ans. Andur	"Lapsed ja lennukid"	6	343	1	7	9
8	Meister ja Mari	"Unemati"	3	2,444	8	11	6
9	Getter Jaani	"Rockefeller Street"	9	5,857	10	19	1
10	Outloudz	"I Wanna Meet Bob Dylan"	10	3,026	9	19	2

Semi-final 2 – 19 February 2011
R/O	Artist	Song	Jury	Televote		Total	Place
R/O	Artist	Song	Jury	Votes	Points	Total	Place
1	Sõpruse Puiestee and Merili Varik	"Rahu, ainult rahu"	2	1,328	6	8	6
2	Shirubi Ikazuchi	"St. Cabah"	3	403	3	6	7
3	Sofia Rubina	"My Melody"	4	203	2	6	8
4	Mimicry	"The Storm"	7	547	4	11	4
5	Orelipoiss	"Valss"	9	1,953	8	17	1
6	Uku Suviste	"Jagatud öö"	—	—	—	—	—
7	Tiiu Kiik	"Second Chance"	1	197	1	2	9
8	MID	"Smile"	8	1,403	7	15	3
9	Ithaka Maria	"Hopa'pa-rei!"	6	5,751	9	15	2
10	Rolf Junior	"All & Now"	5	1,285	5	10	5

==== Final ====
The final took place on 26 February 2011 at the Nokia Concert Hall in Tallinn, hosted by Piret Järvis, Lenna Kuurmaa and Ott Sepp. The five entries that qualified from each of the two preceding semi-finals, all together ten songs, competed during the show. The winner was selected over two rounds of voting. In the first round, a jury (50%) and public televote (50%) determined the top two entries to proceed to the superfinal. The public vote in the first round registered 63,190 votes. In the superfinal, "Rockefeller Street" performed by Getter Jaani was selected as the winner entirely by a public televote. The public televote in the superfinal registered 45,235 votes. The jury panel that voted in the first round of the final consisted of Jaanus Nőgisto (musician), Iiris Vesik (singer), Erik Morna (Raadio 2 head of music), Veronika Portsmuth (conductor and singer), Chalice (singer), Kristo Rajsaare (Rabarocki and Tallinn Music Week organizer), Hannaliisa Uusmaa (musician), Siim Nestor (music critic), Peeter Vähi (composer), Helen Sildna (Tallinn Music Week organizer) and Ott Lepland (singer).

Final – 26 February 2011
R/O	Artist	Song	Jury		Televote		Total	Place
R/O	Artist	Song	Votes	Points	Votes	Points	Total	Place
1	Ithaka Maria	"Hopa'pa-rei!"	52	3	12,069	9	12	5
2	Rolf Junior	"All & Now"	67	6	1,548	2	8	8
3	Orelipoiss	"Valss"	81	10	5,441	6	16	3
4	Getter Jaani	"Rockefeller Street"	68	7	15,679	10	17	1
5	Jana Kask	"Don't Want Anything"	74	8	3,364	5	13	4
6	MID	"Smile"	62	5	3,264	4	9	7
7	Outloudz	"I Wanna Meet Bob Dylan"	81	9	10,747	8	17	2
8	Mimicry	"The Storm"	32	2	885	1	3	10
9	Noorkuu	"Be My Saturday Night"	31	1	3,121	3	4	9
10	Victoria	"Baby Had You"	57	4	7,072	7	11	6

Detailed Jury Votes
R/O	Song	J. Nőgisto	I. Vesik	E. Morna	V. Portsmuth	Chalice	K. Rajsaare	H. Uusmaa	S. Nestor	P. Vähi	H. Sildna	O. Lepland	Total
1	"Hopa'pa-rei!"	4	4	3	9	6	2	3	5	6	5	5	52
2	"All & Now"	8	7	7	1	2	4	8	9	5	8	8	67
3	"Valss"	1	5	10	10	10	9	9	10	1	9	7	81
4	"Rockefeller Street"	9	9	6	5	3	5	4	8	10	3	6	68
5	"Don't Want Anything"	6	6	5	6	9	3	10	7	9	4	9	74
6	"Smile"	3	1	9	7	8	10	7	4	2	7	4	62
7	"I Wanna Meet Bob Dylan"	10	10	8	8	7	7	5	6	4	6	10	81
8	"The Storm"	5	3	1	4	4	6	2	2	3	1	1	32
9	"Be My Saturday Night"	7	2	2	3	1	1	1	3	7	2	2	31
10	"Baby Had You"	2	8	4	2	5	8	6	1	8	10	3	57

Superfinal – 26 February 2011
R/O	Artist	Song	Televote	Place
1	Outloudz	"I Wanna Meet Bob Dylan"	17,223	2
2	Getter Jaani	"Rockefeller Street"	28,102	1

== At Eurovision ==
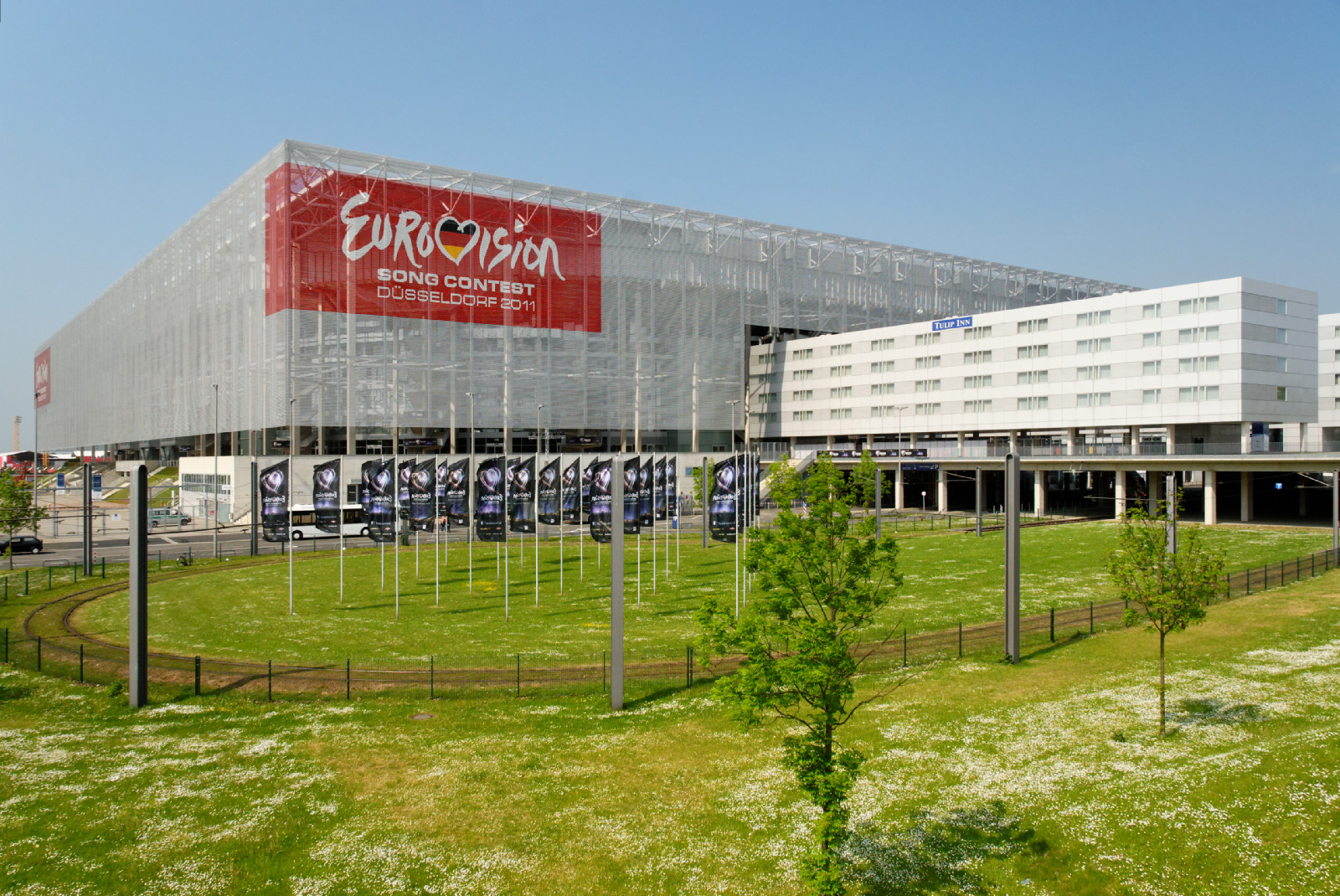
Espirit Arena, host venue of the 2011 contest.

According to Eurovision rules, all nations with the exceptions of the host country and the "Big Five" (France, Germany, Italy, Spain and the United Kingdom) are required to qualify from one of two semi-finals in order to compete for the final; the top ten countries from each semi-final progress to the final. The European Broadcasting Union (EBU) split up the competing countries into six different pots based on voting patterns from previous contests, with countries with favourable voting histories put into the same pot. On 17 January 2011, a special allocation draw was held which placed each country into one of the two semi-finals, as well as which half of the show they would perform in. Estonia was placed into the second semi-final, to be held on 12 May 2011, and was scheduled to perform in the second half of the show. The running order for the semi-finals was decided through another draw on 15 March 2011 and Estonia was set to perform in position 15, following the entry from Romania and before the entry from Belarus.

The two semi-finals and the final were broadcast in Estonia on ETV and via radio on Raadio 2 with commentary by Marko Reikop. The Estonian spokesperson, who announced the Estonian votes during the final, was Piret Järvis who had previously represented Switzerland in the Eurovision Song Contest in 2005 as member of the band Vanilla Ninja.

=== Semi-final ===
Getter Jaani took part in technical rehearsals on 4 and 8 May, followed by dress rehearsals on 11 and 12 May. This included the jury show on 11 May where the professional juries of each country watched and voted on the competing entries.

The Estonian performance featured Getter Jaani performing on stage in a short black and pink dress and joined by three dancers: Ahti Kiili, Ahto Paasik and Eghert-Sören Nõmm, and two backing vocalists: Anna Põldvee and Marilin Kongo, with the stage displaying several podiums in different heights and the silhouette of a city, the latter which also appeared on the LED screens. Jaani began the performance by performing a trick where she turned a piece of cloth into a stick with the dancers offering roses to Jaani at the end of the performance.

At the end of the show, Estonia was announced as having finished in the top 10 and subsequently qualifying for the grand final. It was later revealed that Estonia placed 9th in the semi-final, receiving a total of 60 points.

=== Final ===
Shortly after the second semi-final, a winners' press conference was held for the ten qualifying countries. As part of this press conference, the qualifying artists took part in a draw to determine the running order for the final. This draw was done in the order the countries were announced during the semi-final. Estonia was drawn to perform in position 8, following the entry from Sweden and before the entry from Greece. On the day of the grand final, bookmakers considered Estonia the second most likely country to win the competition.

Getter Jaani once again took part in dress rehearsals on 13 and 14 May before the final, including the jury final where the professional juries cast their final votes before the live show. Getter Jaani performed a repeat of her semi-final performance during the final on 14 May. At the conclusion of the voting, Estonia finished in twenty-fourth place with 44 points.

=== Voting ===
Voting during the three shows consisted of 50 percent public televoting and 50 percent from a jury deliberation. The jury consisted of five music industry professionals who were citizens of the country they represent. This jury was asked to judge each contestant based on: vocal capacity; the stage performance; the song's composition and originality; and the overall impression by the act. In addition, no member of a national jury could be related in any way to any of the competing acts in such a way that they cannot vote impartially and independently.

Following the release of the full split voting by the EBU after the conclusion of the competition, it was revealed that Estonia had placed thirteenth with the public televote and sixth with the jury vote in the second semi-final. In the public vote, Estonia scored 46 points, while with the jury vote, Estonia scored 83 points. In the final, Estonia placed twenty-third with the public televote with 32 points and eighteenth with the jury vote, scoring 74 points.

Below is a breakdown of points awarded to Estonia and awarded by Estonia in the second semi-final and grand final of the contest, and the breakdown of the jury voting and televoting conducted during the two shows:

==== Points awarded to Estonia ====
Points awarded to Estonia (Semi-final 2)
Score	Country
12 points	
10 points	Ireland
8 points	Latvia; Ukraine
7 points	
6 points	Belgium; Sweden
5 points	Austria; Israel
4 points	Bulgaria; France
3 points	Denmark
2 points	
1 point	Belarus

Points awarded to Estonia (Final)
Score	Country
12 points	
10 points	
8 points	
7 points	Finland; Ireland; Lithuania
6 points	Moldova
5 points	Israel
4 points	Latvia
3 points	
2 points	Belgium; Denmark; Norway; Ukraine
1 point	

==== Points awarded by Estonia ====
Points awarded by Estonia (Semi-final 2)
Score	Country
12 points	Sweden
10 points	Denmark
8 points	Latvia
7 points	Ukraine
6 points	Romania
5 points	Slovenia
4 points	Belarus
3 points	Ireland
2 points	Austria
1 point	Belgium

Points awarded by Estonia (Final)
Score	Country
12 points	Sweden
10 points	Denmark
8 points	Azerbaijan
7 points	Finland
6 points	Italy
5 points	Russia
4 points	Spain
3 points	Georgia
2 points	Slovenia
1 point	Romania

Jury points awarded by Estonia (Final)
Score	Country
12 points	Denmark
10 points	Sweden
8 points	Italy
7 points	Spain
6 points	Slovenia
5 points	Romania
4 points	Switzerland
3 points	Serbia
2 points	France
1 point	Finland
