= Rabarock =

Rock festival in Estonia

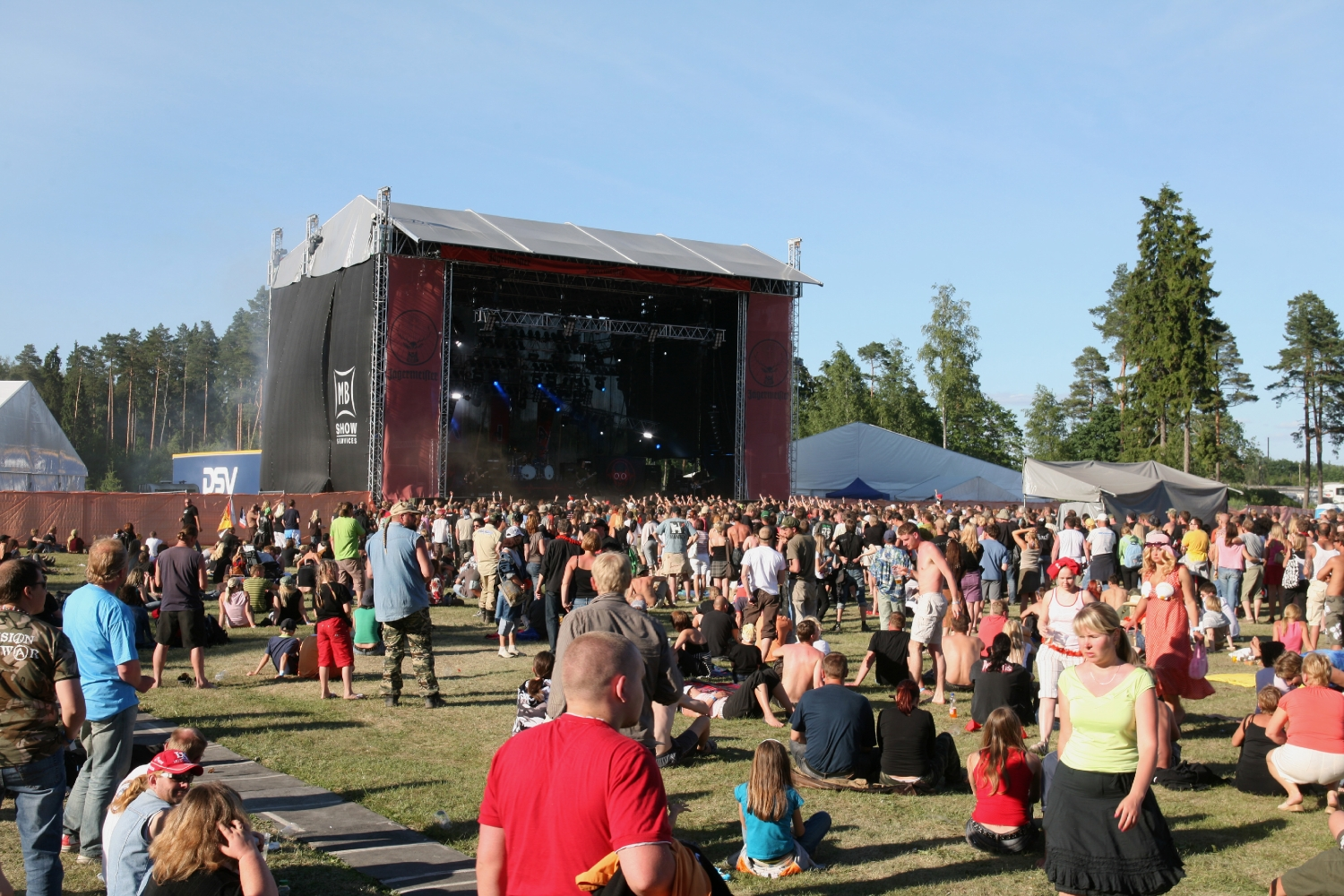
- Rabarock 2007
- Genre: Alternative rock, punk, metal
- Locations: Järvakandi, Estonia
- Years active: 2005–2009, 2011–2012
- Founders: Kristo Rajasaare
- Website: www.rabarock.ee

Rabarock was a rock festival held annually in Järvakandi, Estonia between 2005–2009 and 2011–2012. It took place in the first half of June.

== Dates and headliners ==
- 2012, 15–16 June
  - Andrew W.K. (USA), The Big Pink (UK), Dramamama (EST), Dub FX & Flower Fairy (AUS), Dwarves (USA), Ewert and The Two Dragons (EST), The Experimental Tropic Blues Band (BEL), G-Enka (EST), Kosmikud (EST), Kukerpillid (EST), Liis Lemsalu (EST), Mahavok (EST), Menwhopause (IND), Merwis (EST), Metsatöll (EST), Reckless Love (FIN), Skyforger (LAT), The Stranglers (UK), Tenfold Rabbit (EST).
  - The Von Hertzen Brothers (FIN) cancelled its planned show on 15 June and was replaced by Mahavok(EST).
- 2011, 17–18 June
  - Abraham (EST), Aides (EST), Anal Thunder (FIN), Apelsin (EST), The Bad Ass Brass Band (FIN), Circle (FIN), Def Räädu (EST), DND (UK), Electric Wizard (UK), Ewert & The Two Dragons (EST), Filter (USA), Goresoerd (EST), IAMX (UK), J.M.K.E. (EST), Kurjam (EST), Metsatöll (EST), Mustasch (SWE), Nevesis (EST), NoMeansNo (CAN), Orelipoiss (EST), Pendulum (AU), Public Image Ltd (UK), Rock-Hotel plays Rock-Hotel 1983 (EST), Rock Reality band (EST), Singer Vinger (EST), Sunrise Avenue (FIN), Teräsbetoni (FIN), Ultima Thule (EST), Winny Puhh (EST).
- 2010, Rabarock was cancelled due to financial crises.
- 2009, 12–13 June
  - A.Human (UK), Anthrax (USA), B.D.Ö. (EST), Gary Numan (UK), KMFDM (GER), Kosmikud (EST), Ladytron (UK), Metsatöll (EST), No-Big-Silence (EST), Pantoktaator (EST), Pedigree (EST), Popidiot (EST), Robots in Disguise (UK), Static-X (USA), Velikije Luki (EST), Viikate (FIN), The Wildhearts (UK), Zetod (EST).
- 2008, 13–14 June
  - Black Lips (USA), Compromise Blue (EST), Danko Jones (CAN), Electric Eel Shock (JAP), The Fall (UK), Fujiya & Miyagi (UK), Helloween (GER), HU? (EST), Kotiteollisuus (FIN), Los Bastardos Finlandeses (FIN), Metsatöll (EST), Pitchshifter (UK), Propeller (EST), Psychoterror (EST), Silvi Vrait & Ultima Thule (EST), Sparks (USA), Truckfighters (SWE), Vaiko Eplik & Eliit (EST).
- 2007, 15–16 June
  - Agent M (EST), Apoptygma Berzerk (NOR), Clawfinger (SWE), Dagö (EST), The Datsuns (NZL), Electric Six (USA), Kosmikud (EST), Laibach (SLO), Metsatöll (EST), Nick Oliveri And The Mondo Generator (USA), Mr. Lawrence (EST), Pain (SWE), Pedigree (EST), Peer Günt (FIN), Poets of the Fall (FIN), Shelton San (EST), Tanel Padar & The Sun (EST), Tharaphita (EST).
- 2006, 9–10 June
  - Brides in Bloom (EST), Cleaning Women (FIN), The Cooper Temple Clause (UK), Hardcore Superstar (SWE), J.M.K.E. (EST), Korpiklaani (FIN), Kreator (GER), Metsatöll (EST), The Misfits (USA), Negative (FIN), No-Big-Silence (EST), Onu Bella Band (EST), Oomph! (GER), Rosta Aknad (EST), The Skreppers (FIN), Slide-Fifty (EST), Suburban Tribe (FIN), Ultima Thule (EST).
- 2005, 10–11 June
  - 22-Pistepirkko (FIN), The 69 Eyes (FIN), Boomhauer (FIN), East Trading Wang (EST), Eläkeläiset (FIN), The Exploited (UK), Extra Virgin (FIN), Kometa (FIN), Led R (EST), Melody Club (SWE), Mesh (UK), Metsatöll (EST), Röövel Ööbik (EST), Singer Vinger (EST), SuperHuman (LAT), Tanel Padar & The Sun (EST), Therapy? (UK), Tõnis Mägi & Muusik Seif (EST)
