= Corona Capital festival line-ups =

Corona Capital is an annual music festival held in Mexico City, Mexico. It was first held in 2010, while a spring edition was held in Guadalajara from 2018 to 2023.

== Line-ups ==
All information taken from various sources. Headline performers are listed in Boldface. The acts are listed in the order they performed.

== 2010 ==
- Date: 16 October 2010
- Venue: Curva 4 Autódromo Hermanos Rodríguez, Mexico City, Mexico

Stage Corona: Le Butcherettes, Minus the Bear, Two Door Cinema Club, Furland, The Temper Trap, Regina Spektor, James, Pixies

Stage Capital: Dirty Karma, She's A Tease, Flyleaf, Adanowsky, White Lies, Echo & the Bunnymen, Interpol

Stage Corona Light: 60 Tigres, Napoleon Solo, Triángulo de Amor Bizarro, Rey Pila, Chikita Violenta, Delphic, Dapuntobeat, Foals, The Soft Pack

== 2011 ==
- Date: 15 October 2011
- Venue: Curva 4 Autódromo Hermanos Rodríguez, Mexico City, Mexico

Corona Stage: Torreblanca, Ximena Sariñana, Austin TV, Mogwai, Coheed and Cambria, The Strokes

Capital Stage: Yellow Yesterday, Ruido Rosa, Le Baron, Wild Beasts, OMD, Santigold, Editors, Portishead

Corona Light Stage: Madame Recaimer, Bengala, Quiero Club, The Antlers, Disco Ruido, CSS, Moby

Bizco Club Stage: Little Ethiopia, Black Fo, El Cuarto, Javiera Mena, Wavves, El Columpio Asesino, No Age, These New Puritans, M83, Toy Selectah & 3Ball MTY, The Rapture

== 2012 ==
- Dates: 13–14 October 2012
- Venue: Curva 4 Autódromo Hermanos Rodríguez, Mexico City, Mexico

Corona Stage
Saturday: Los Plastics Revolution, Vicente Gayo, Dum Dum Girls, The Joy Formidable, The Wallflowers, The Kills, The Hives
Sunday: Bam Bam, Tribes, Here We Go Magic, The Big Pink, The Vaccines, M. Ward, My Morning Jacket, The Black Keys

Capital Stage
Saturday: Los Rayobacks, Freelance Whales, La Habitación Roja, Zulu Winter, AWOLNATION, The Airborne Toxic Event, León Larregui, Cat Power, Franz Ferdinand
Sunday: Ventilader, I Can Chase Dragons!, LP, Francisca Valenzuela, Alabama Shakes, The Maccabees, The Drums, Snow Patrol, Florence and the Machine

Corona Light Stage
Saturday: Technicolor Fabrics, MUTEMATH, Hello Seahorse!, The Walkmen, Iron And Wine, Suede
Sunday: Los Impostors, L.A., St. Lucia, Black Lips, The Raveonettes, Tegan and Sara, New Order

Corona Bizco Stage
Saturday: María y José, Bufi, Baio, Unknown Mortal Orchestra, Die Antwoord, Death in Vegas, Major Lazer, Sleigh Bells, Miike Snow, Basement Jaxx
Sunday: Josef Bamba, Memory Man, Rebolledo, Los Rakas, Shabazz Palaces, AraabMuzik, WhoMadeWho, Neon Indian, James Murphy, Modeselektor, A-Trak, DJ Shadow

== 2013 ==
- Dates: 12–13 October 2013
- Venue: Curva 4 Autódromo Hermanos Rodríguez, Mexico City, Mexico

Corona Stage
Saturday: Quadron, Io Echo, Chris Lake, White Lies, The xx, Deadmau5
Sunday: Ice Age, The Black Angels, Capital Cities, Miles Kane, The Breeders, Queens of the Stone Age

Capital Stage
Saturday: The Postelles, MS MR, Kurt Vile, ~~Conor Oberst~~, Imagine Dragons, Dinosaur Jr., Phoenix
Sunday: Deap Vally, Jake Bugg, Portugal. The Man, Matt and Kim, Stereophonics, Vampire Weekend, Arctic Monkeys

Corona Light Stage
Saturday: Robert DeLong, Palma Violets, The Dandy Warhols, Travis, The Crystal Method
Sunday: Perfume Genius, Gary Clark Jr., Jimmy Eat World, ~~Fun.~~, Sigur Rós

Bizco Club Stage
Saturday: Nguzunguzu, Peace, Toy, ~~Death Grips~~, Jacques Lu Cont, The Presets, M.I.A., Blondie
Sunday: DJ Harvey, Mueran Humanos, ~~John Talabot~~, Fuck Buttons, Jamie xx, Savages, Grimes, ~~Squarepusher~~ Giorgio Moroder

== 2014 ==
- Dates: 11–12 October 2014
- Venue: Curva 4 Autódromo Hermanos Rodríguez, Mexico City, Mexico

Corona Stage
Saturday: Deafheaven, The Julie Ruin, The Ghost of a Saber Tooth Tiger, Best Coast, Little Dragon, Zedd, Jack White
Sunday: Charming Liars, White Denim, Deorro, Chvrches, Belle and Sebastian, Haim, Kings of Leon

Doritos Stage
Saturday: MØ, Real Estate, Kongos, Biffy Clyro, Holy Ghost!, Weezer, Massive Attack
Sunday: James Bay, Rixton, Sam Smith, Gareth Emery, Kasabian, Foster the People, Beck

Corona Light Stage
Saturday: Black English, Cults, Black Kids, Jenny Lewis, Conor Oberst, MGMT
Sunday: Cut Snake, Young & Sick, ~~Hozier~~, St. Vincent, Damon Albarn, The Kooks

Claro Musica Bizco Club
Saturday: Ricoshëi, Sinjin Hawke, Yung Lean, Hercules & Love Affair, Pond, Jungle, GusGus, SBTRKT, The Horrors
Sunday: Dohko, Phillipp Gorbachev, Kate Boy, Cashmere Cat, Temples, Twin Shadow, Tune-Yards, Sky Ferreira, Metronomy, Lykke Li

== 2015 ==
- Dates: 21–22 November 2015
- Venue: Curva 4 Autódromo Hermanos Rodríguez, Mexico City, Mexico

Corona Stage
Saturday: Alvvays, Title Fight, Chairlift, Father John Misty, Ryan Adams, Muse
Sunday: Milo Greene, Sohn, Twenty One Pilots, Spoon, Fatboy Slim, Calvin Harris

Doritos Stage
Saturday: The New Regime, MOTHXR, Benjamin Booker, Kiesza, Kygo, DFA 1979, The Libertines
Sunday: Poppy, Shamir, Miami Horror, Mew, Sleater-Kinney, Pixies

Corona Light Stage
Saturday: Wild Nothing, DIIV, Halsey, The Psychedelic Furs, Richard Ashcroft, Beirut
Sunday: The Griswolds, Circa Waves, The Charlatans, Primal Scream, Ratatat

Claro Musica Tent
Saturday: Humans, Skylar Spence, Goldroom, RAC, Run the Jewels, The Bloody Beetroots, Porter Robinson
Sunday: Bronze Whale, George FitzGerald, Tokimonsta, Brodinski, ~~Tchami~~, Robin Schulz, Chromeo

== 2016 ==
- Dates: 19–20 November 2016
- Venue: Curva 4 Autódromo Hermanos Rodríguez, Mexico City, Mexico

Corona Stage
Saturday: Gin Wigmore, Eryn Allen Kane, Dashboard Confessional, Courtney Barnett, Haim, The Killers
Sunday: A Silent Film, Saint Motel, Walk the Moon, Yeasayer, Suede, LCD Soundsystem

Doritos Stage
Saturday: Caveman, The Struts, Marian Hill, Edward Sharpe & the Magnetic Zeros, Unknown Mortal Orchestra, Richard Ashcroft, Air
Sunday: Bleached, Yuck, Peter Bjorn and John, Eagles of Death Metal, Grimes, Lana Del Rey

Corona Light Stage
Saturday: Parquet Courts, Wild Beasts, Tegan and Sara, Band of Horses, Pet Shop Boys
Sunday: Delorentos, Allah-Las, Wild Nothing, Super Furry Animals, Warpaint, Kraftwerk

Levi's Tent
Saturday: Gryffin, Cloves, Låpsley, Young Fathers, Fischerspooner, Lost Frequencies, Animal Collective
Sunday: Sofi Tukker, Louis the Child, Frances, AlunaGeorge, Breakbot, Galantis, Mark Ronson vs Kevin Parker

== 2017 ==
- Dates: 18–19 November 2017
- Venue: Curva 4 Autódromo Hermanos Rodríguez, Mexico City, Mexico

Corona Stage
Saturday: Palmistry, Circa Waves, Daya, Japandroids, Elbow, Foo Fighters
Sunday: Shy Girls, Parson James, Crystal Fighters, The Drums, The Shins, Green Day

Doritos Stage
Saturday: Sheppard, You Me at Six, Cherry Glazerr, Angel Olsen, Metronomy, Cage the Elephant, The xx
Sunday: LANY, Wild Belle, Mystery Jets, Grouplove, Grizzly Bear, Phoenix

Corona Light Stage
Saturday: Spencer Ludwig, Joseph, Daughter, Mogwai, PJ Harvey, Maxïmo Park
Sunday: Honne, Whitney, Dua Lipa, Cold War Kids, Alt-J

Levi's Tent
Saturday: Anika, Tennyson, Lido, Andrew W.K., DJ Mustard, Banks & Steelz, Kehlani
Sunday: Rafferty, Washed Out, The Sounds, Bakermat, Gorgon City, Boys Noize

== 2018 ==
=== Mexico City ===
- Dates: 17–18 November 2018
- Venue: Curva 4 Autódromo Hermanos Rodríguez, Mexico City, Mexico

Corona Stage
Saturday: Blank Range, Yungblud, Sparks, Bastille, The Kooks, Robbie Williams
Sunday: Sasha Sloan, San Fermin, Nathaniel Rateliff & the Night Sweats, The Neighbourhood, MGMT, Imagine Dragons

Doritos Stage
Saturday: Gus Dapperton, Pond, Jenny Lewis, The Jesus and Mary Chain, Lorde
Sunday: The New Regime, K.Flay, The Lemon Twigs, The War on Drugs, Nine Inch Nails

Corona Light Stage
Saturday: Pale Waves, Now, Now, Atlas Genius, Panic! at the Disco, Børns, The Chemical Brothers
Sunday: Bad Sounds, ~~Max~~, Deaf Havana, Digitalism, Death Cab for Cutie, New Order

Levi's Tent
Saturday: Clairo, Quinn XCII, Shannon and the Clams, Petit Biscuit, Friendly Fires, Odesza
Sunday: King Henry, Jai Wolf, A R I Z O N A, Superorganism, Mercury Rev, Chvrches, Khalid

=== Guadalajara ===
- Date: 7 April 2018
- Venue: Foro Alterno, Zapopan, (Note: Labeled as Guadalajara.) Mexico

Corona Stage: Frank Turner, Penguin Prison, Tennis, GusGus, David Byrne, The Killers

Capital Stage: Darwin Deez, Poolside, Matt and Kim, Cut Copy, Alanis Morissette

Levi's Tent: Jarami, Anna Lunoe, Snakehips, Alison Wonderland, ~~Robin Schulz~~

== 2019 ==
=== Mexico City ===
- Dates: 16–17 November 2019
- Venue: Curva 4 Autódromo Hermanos Rodríguez, Mexico City, Mexico

Corona Stage
Saturday: Shaed, Noah Cyrus, King Princess, The B-52's, Franz Ferdinand, The Strokes
Sunday: The Front Bottoms, Snail Mail, Two Feet, The Voidz, Bloc Party, Interpol

Corona Light Stage
Saturday: Phosphorescent, Bad Suns, St. Lucia, Cat Power, Travis, Two Door Cinema Club
Sunday: Kero Kero Bonito, Car Seat Headrest, Broken Social Scene, The Raconteurs, Billie Eilish

Doritos Stage
Saturday: Inhaler, Blossoms, Alice Merton, Phantogram, Weezer
Sunday: Brutus, Kurt Vile, Sofi Tukker, Flume, Keane

Levi's Tent
Saturday: Sales, Mija (Live), Miami Horror, Poolside, Tycho, Dirty Projectors, Nick Murphy FKA Chet Faker
Sunday: Dear Boy, In the Valley Below, The Midnight, Elderbrook, Max, Polo & Pan, Years & Years

Seat Stage
Saturday: Pip Blom, Keuning, Georgia, SWMRS, Bruno Major, The Japanese House
Sunday: Lucy Dacus, Still Woozy, Yung Bae, Hippie Sabotage, Sharon Van Etten

=== Guadalajara ===
- Date: 11 May 2019
- Venue: Estadio Akron, Zapopan, Mexico

Corona Stage: Boy Pablo, Of Montreal, Honne, White Lies, Christine and the Queens, OMD, Phoenix, Tame Impala

Kia Stage: TOPS, The Joy Formidable, Kimbra, Rhye, Goo Goo Dolls, Yeah Yeah Yeahs, The Chemical Brothers

Levi's Tent: GG Magree, Classixx, Holy Ghost!, Goldroom, Jax Jones, Chromeo, Dillon Francis

== 2021 ==
=== Mexico City ===
- Date: 20–21 November 2021
- Venue: Curva 4 Autódromo Hermanos Rodríguez, Mexico City, Mexico

Corona Stage:
Saturday: Hana, Elliot Moss, All Time Low, Cheap Trick, Tame Impala
Sunday: Niko Rubio, Will Joseph Cook, The Lightning Seeds, Aurora, Royal Blood, Twenty One Pilots

Corona Cero Stage:
Saturday: Missio, SG Lewis, Turnstile, Khruangbin, The Kooks
Sunday: Sir Chloe, Alaina Castillo, The Whitest Boy Alive, Jehnny Beth

Doritos Stage:
Saturday: Alfie Templeman, Boy Pablo, Bleachers, LP, Disclosure
Sunday: Adam Melchor, Cautious Clay, Parquet Courts, The Bravery, Rüfüs Du Sol

Viva Aerobus Stage:
Saturday: Goss, Fakear, !!! (DJ set), Electric Guest, Slowthai, Ashnikko
Sunday: Jvke, Glaive, Ela Minus, George FitzGerald, Pabllo Vittar, 070 Shake, Flight Facilities

Bosque Stage:
Saturday: Hamzaa, Faye Webster, Ritt Momney, Yendry, Dayglow
Sunday: Gaia Gozzi, Smith & Thell, Flamingosis, JP Saxe, Nessa Barrett

== 2022 ==
=== Mexico City ===
- Date: 18–20 November 2022
- Venue: Curva 4 Autódromo Hermanos Rodríguez, Mexico City, Mexico

Friday	Saturday	Sunday
Corona Stage
**My Chemical Romance**; White Lies; Courteeners; Viagra Boys; Julie; Blondshell	**Arctic Monkeys**; Yeah Yeah Yeahs; Foals; Inhaler; Beach Bunny; The Altons	**Miley Cyrus**; Idles; Kim Gordon; Father John Misty; Ashe; Madison McFerrin
Vans Stage
Kacey Musgraves; Marina; Free Nationals; L.S. Dunes; G Flip	Paramore; The Kooks; X Ambassadors; Black Midi; Beak>	Lil Nas X; Phoebe Bridgers; Everything Everything; The Linda Lindas; Spacey Jane
Corona Agua Rifada Stage
Charli XCX; Mitski; Cigarettes After Sex; Wallows; Raveena; Kills Birds	Liam Gallagher; Bright Eyes; Spoon; Ibeyi; Benny Sings; The Range	The 1975; Paolo Nutini; Amber Mark; The Jungle Giants
Viva Tent
Run the Jewels; Marc Rebillet; Big Wild; Aly & AJ; Bülow; Underscores; Chai	Jamie xx; Kavinsky; Bob Moses; Sevdaliza; Surf Mesa; Empress Of; Belief	Madeon; Mura Masa; MØ; Betty Who; Sad Night Dynamite; Lilyisthatyou; Model Man
Bosque Stage
Cuco; Jxdn; Andy Shauf; Hope Tala; Corook	Remi Wolf; Current Joys; Beabadoobee; Anna of the North; JORDY	Girl in Red; Surf Curse; Men I Trust; Cory Wong; Sofía Valdés

=== Guadalajara ===
- Date: 21–22 May 2022
- Venue: Valle VFG, Tlajomulco de Zúñiga, Mexico

**Corona Agua Rifada Stage**
Saturday	Sunday
**The Strokes**; Chvrches; Metronomy; X Ambassadors; Whitney; Cass McCombs	**Kings of Leon**; Chet Faker; Young the Giant; Gabriel Garzón-Montano; Alexandra Savior
Kia Stage
Blondie; Death Cab for Cutie; Metric; The Drums; Julia Holter; Savoir Adore	The Hives; Jake Bugg; Smash Mouth; Inner Wave; Margaret Glaspy; Billie Marten
Viva Tent
Miami Horror; Kamasi Washington; Cavetown; Q; Loyal Lobos; Tirzah	Tove Lo; Digitalism; Anna of the North; !!!; French 79; Charlotte Adigéry & Bolis Pupul

== 2023 ==
=== Mexico City ===
- Date: 17–19 November 2023
- Venue: Curva 4 Autódromo Hermanos Rodríguez, Mexico City, Mexico

Friday	Saturday	Sunday
Corona Stage
**The Cure**; The Hives; Two Door Cinema Club; The Walkmen; Yard Act; Brooks Nielsen	**Blur**; Jungle; Parcels; Kasabian; The Lathums; Barns Courtney	**Arcade Fire**; Noel Gallagher's High Flying Birds; The Breeders; Sylvan Esso; The Amazons
Vans Stage
**Pulp**; Phoenix; Fitz and the Tantrums; KennyHoopla; Automatic; Belako	**The Black Keys**; Niall Horan; Kim Petras; Black Kids; Atarashii Gakko!; Tessa Violet	**The Chemical Brothers**; The Lumineers; Feist; Suki Waterhouse; Off!; Just Mustard
Corona Cero Stage
**Alanis Morissette**; Fleet Foxes; Brittany Howard; Mother Mother; Soccer Mommy; Fenne Lily	**Thirty Seconds to Mars**; Metronomy; Lauv; Patrick Watson; Nation of Language; Olivia Dean	**Pet Shop Boys**; Sleater-Kinney; Dehd; The Happy Fits; Tennis; Cassia
Nivea Tono Natural Stage
Unknown Mortal Orchestra; Alvvays; Muna; Caroline Rose; Claud; Hannah Storm	Dean Lewis; Sueco; Giant Rooks; Billie Marten; NOIA	Gracie Abrams; D4vd; Arlo Parks; Nai Palm
Viva Tent
Hot Chip; Roosevelt; BoyWithUke; Sampa the Great; Mild Minds; Orion Sun; Busty and the Bass	Fever Ray; Chromeo; Kimbra; Neil Frances; Rebecca Black; Alice Ivy	Major Lazer; Berlin; Zhu; Grace Ives; Eddie Zuko; Ladytron; Goose

=== Guadalajara ===
- Date: 20–21 May 2023
- Venue: Valle VFG, Tlajomulco de Zúñiga, Mexico

**Corona Agua Rifada Stage**
Saturday	Sunday
**Imagine Dragons**; My Morning Jacket; Bastille; Hermanos Gutiérrez; Last Dinosaurs	**Interpol**; Pixies; Bright Eyes; Mother Mother; Royal & the Serpent
Kia Stage
Bloc Party; The Chainsmokers; Charlie Puth; Sugar Ray; Helado Negro	Regina Spektor; Foals; Idles; Pussy Riot; Blonde Redhead; Widowspeak
Viva Tent
M83; Róisín Murphy; Melody's Echo Chamber; Totally Enormous Extinct Dinosaurs; Lewis OfMan; BoomBox	Thundercat; Poolside; Sophie Ellis-Bextor; Blu DeTiger; Caroline Rose; Joon; Joe P

== 2024 ==
=== Mexico City ===
- Date: 15–17 November 2024
- Venue: Curva 4 Autódromo Hermanos Rodríguez, Mexico City, Mexico

Friday	Saturday	Sunday
Corona Stage
**Green Day**; Cage the Elephant; Clairo; Blonde Redhead; City and Colour; Lo Moon	**Shawn Mendes**; Travis; St. Vincent; Crystal Fighters; Luke Hemmings; Petey	**Paul McCartney**; Beck; Nothing But Thieves; Cavetown; Maxïmo Park; Wisp
Vans Stage
**Toto**; The Mars Volta; David Kushner; The Vaccines; Tops; Brigitte Calls Me Baby	**Melanie Martinez**; Jessie Reyez; American Football; Ekkstacy; Nico Vega; The Aquadolls	**Jack White**; Iggy Pop; Leon Bridges; Crumb; Mannequin Pussy; Sprints
Corona Cero Stage
**Zedd**; Raye; Badbadnotgood; James Vincent McMorrow; The Beaches; Water From Your Eyes	**New Order**; Primal Scream; Black Pumas; Del Water Gap; Michelle	**Empire of the Sun**; Porter Robinson; Kim Gordon; Beach Fossils; Hurray For The Riff Raff; Monobloc
Viva Tent
Honne; Twin Shadow; The Yussef Dayes Experience; French 79; Isabel Larosa; Two Another; Very Nice Person	The Blaze; Jorja Smith; Boy Harsher; BBNOS; Charlotte Day Wilson; Tora; Una Mia	Sophie Ellis Bextor; Tuxedo; Natalie Jane; Zimmer90; Biig Piig; Night Tapes
Nivea
Warpaint; Magic!; Alice Phoebe Lou; Blu Eyes; Air Yel	Explosions in the Sky; Thee Sacred Souls; MXMTOON; Busted; Feeble Little Horse	Eyedress; Hermanos Gutierrez; The Magic Numbers; Victoria Canal; Bar Italia

== 2025 ==
=== Mexico City ===
- Date: 14–16 November 2025
- Venue: Curva 4 Autódromo Hermanos Rodríguez, Mexico City, Mexico

Friday	Saturday	Sunday
Corona Stage
**Foo Fighters**; Franz Ferdinand; Kaiser Chiefs; Jet; Whitney	**Chappell Roan**; Aurora; Mogwai; Haute and Freddy; Lyrah	**Linkin Park**; Weezer; AFI; Alexandra Savior; Árný Margrét
Doritos Stage
**Queens of the Stone Age**; Garbage; 4 Non Blondes; Circa Waves	**Vampire Weekend**; Jehnny Beth; Grizzly Bear; Cults	**Deftones**; James; Jerry Cantrell
Corona Sunsets Stage
Polo & Pan; Lucy Dacus; Tamino; Lucy Rose	Alabama Shakes; Cannons; The Struts; Hippo Campus	Of Monsters and Men; TV on the Radio; Peach Pit; Friday Pilots Club
Nivea Stage
Bôa; Nilüfer Yanya; Hollow Coves; Bad Bad Hats	Marina; Sabrina Claudio; Angie McMahon; Parallele	Men I Trust; Real Estate; Kadavar; Jet Vesper
Viva Tent
Aluna; Leisure; Sub Urban; Anna of the North; Sarah Kinsley; Shermanology; Debby Friday	OMD; Half•Alive; Gizmo Varillas; Qendresa; Chrissy Chlapecka; Maiah Manser	TR/ST; Cut Copy; Jordan Rakei; SYML; Adéla; Rose Gray; Chanel Beads

=== Corona Capital Sessions ===
As a part of the 100th anniversary celebrations of Grupo Modelo, Corona Capital launched a series of concerts in 2025 across different cities in Mexico days prior to the main festival titled Corona Capital Sessions. These events were described as a "warm-up" of the festival while being held in venues for 20,000 attendees and comprised some acts featured in the line-up with some exclusive additions.

Guadalajara

- Date: 6 November 2025
- Venue: Estadio Tres de Marzo, Zapopan, Mexico
- Line-up: The Kooks, Phoenix, **Keane**

Mérida

- Date: 8 November 2025
- Venue: Estadio Carlos Iturralde, Mérida, Mexico
- Line-up: Passion Pit, Phoenix, **Keane**

Monterrey

- Date: 12 November 2025
- Venue: Estadio Banorte, Monterrey, Mexico
- Line-up: Jehnny Beth, Queens of the Stone Age, **Foo Fighters**

== Gallery ==
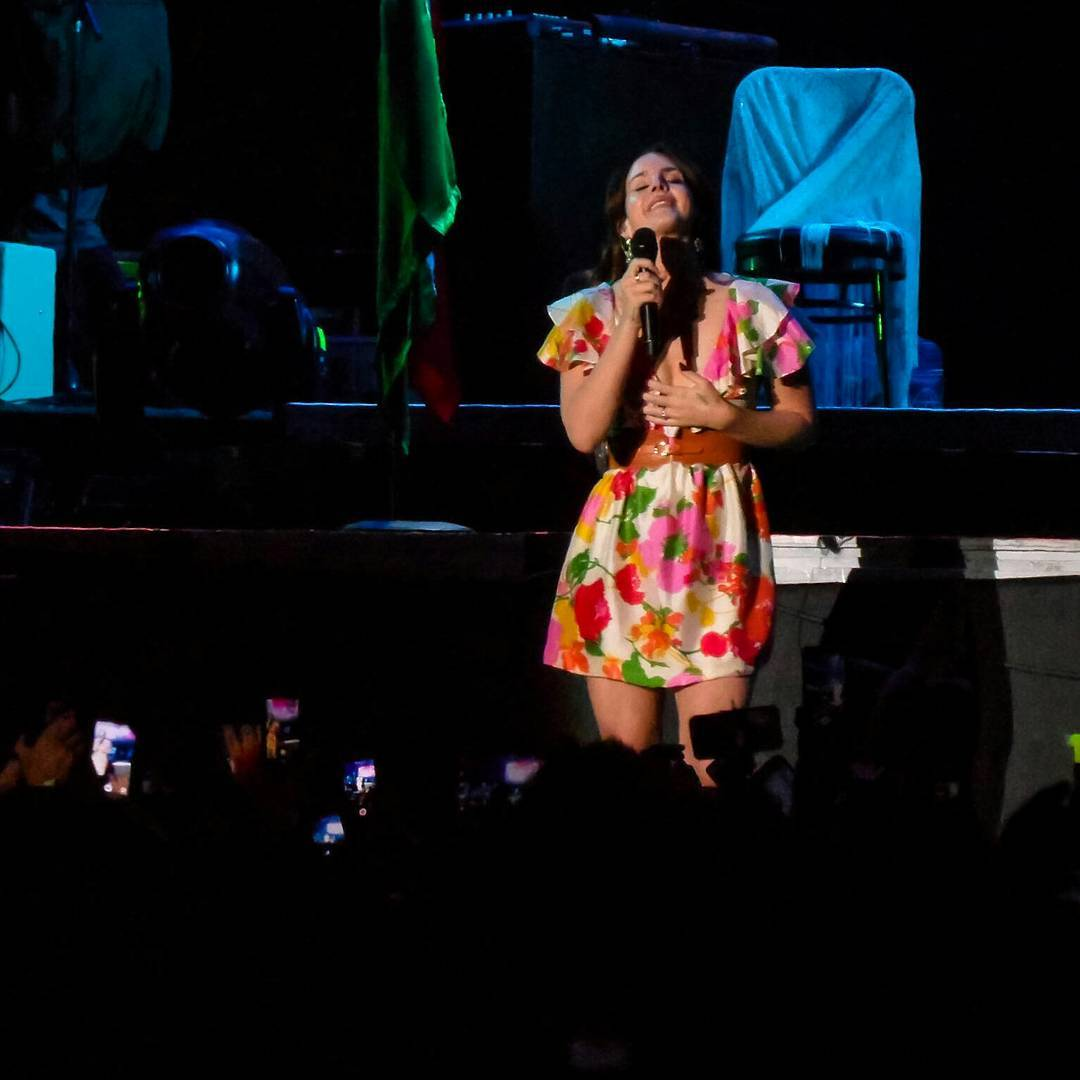
Lana Del Rey during the edition of 2016.

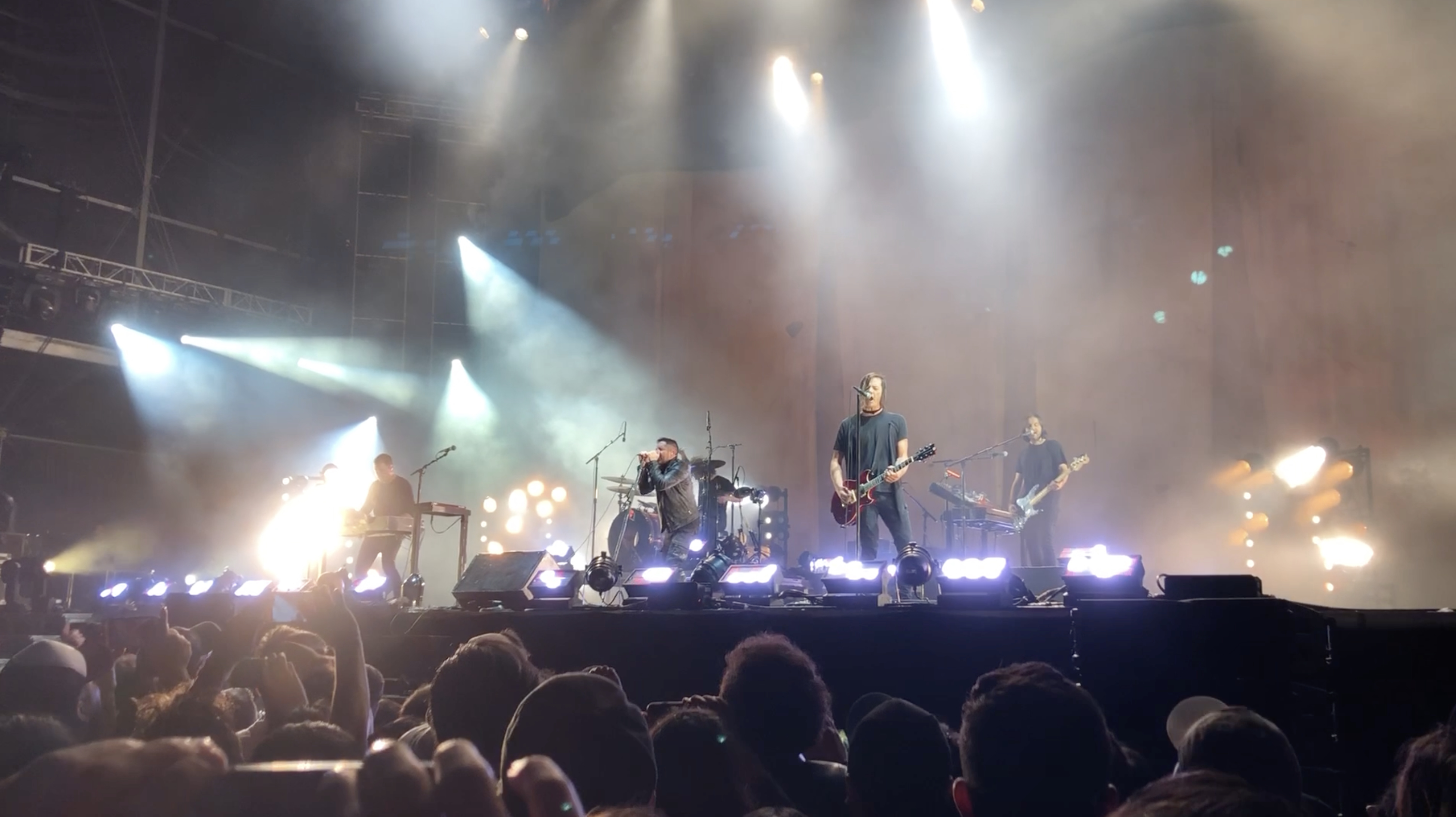
Nine Inch Nails during the edition of 2018.

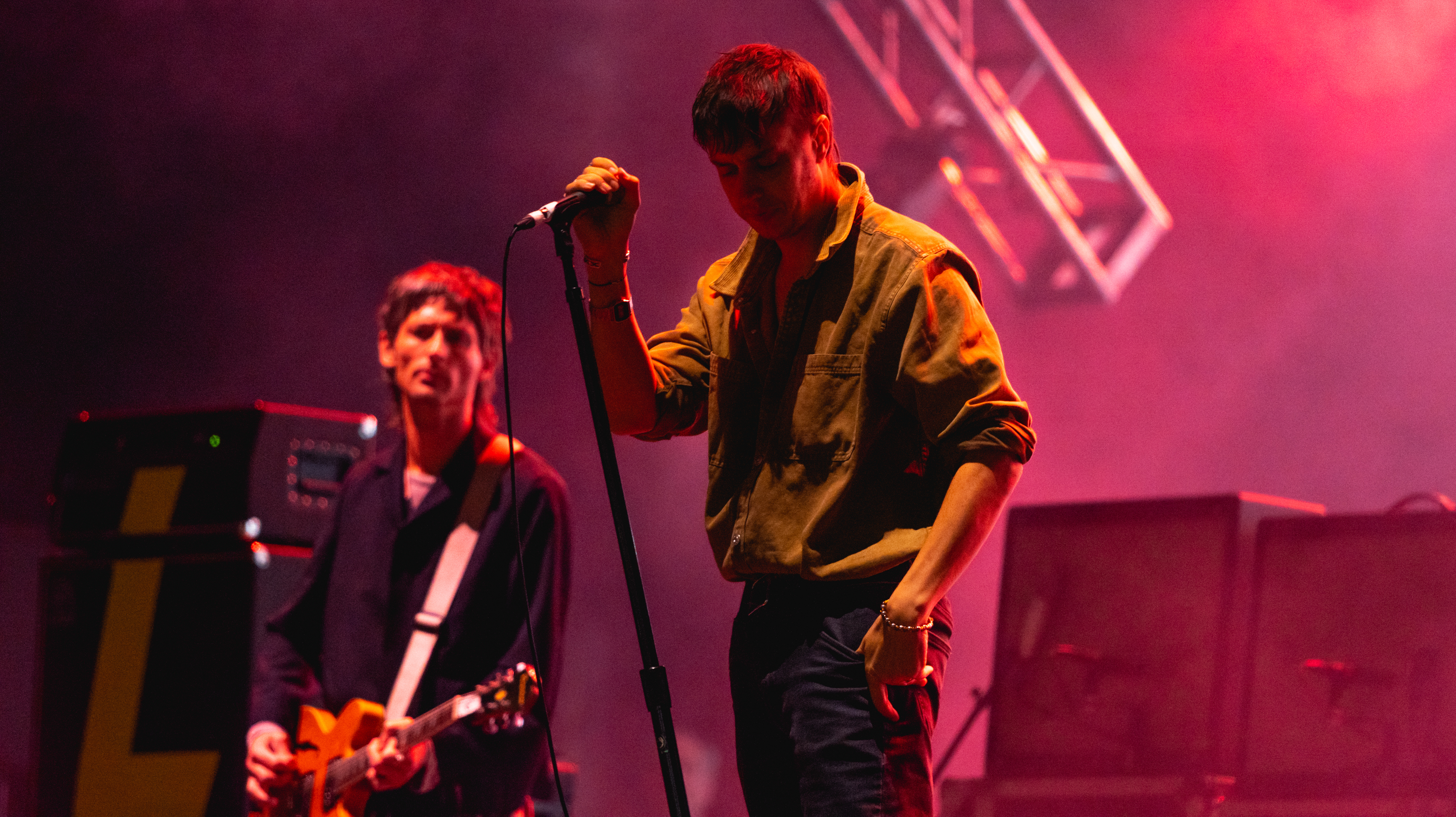
The Strokes during the edition of 2019.

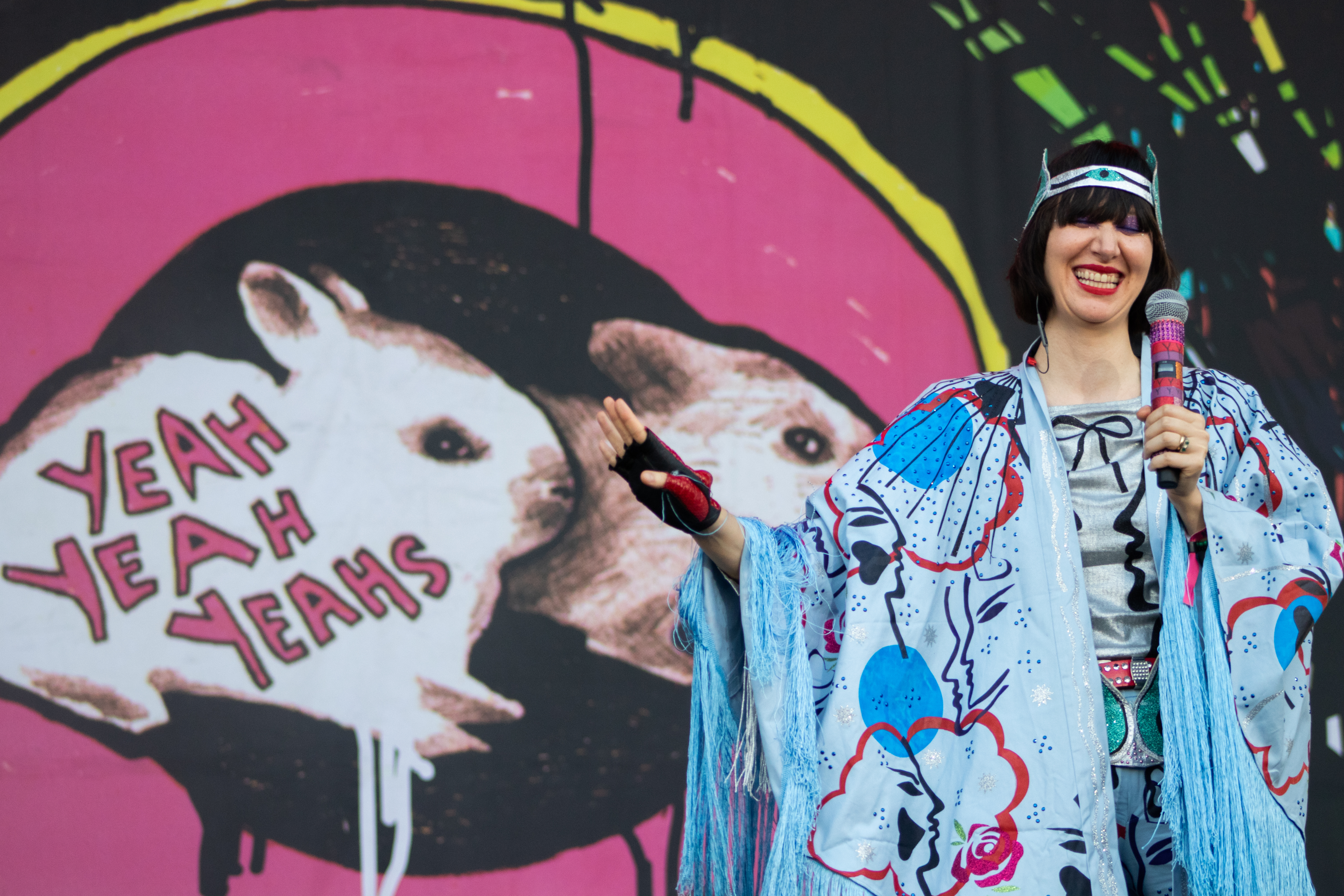
Yeah Yeah Yeahs at Corona Capital Guadalajara in 2019.
