= Tallinn School No. 21 =

School in Tallinn

- Tallinna 21. Kool

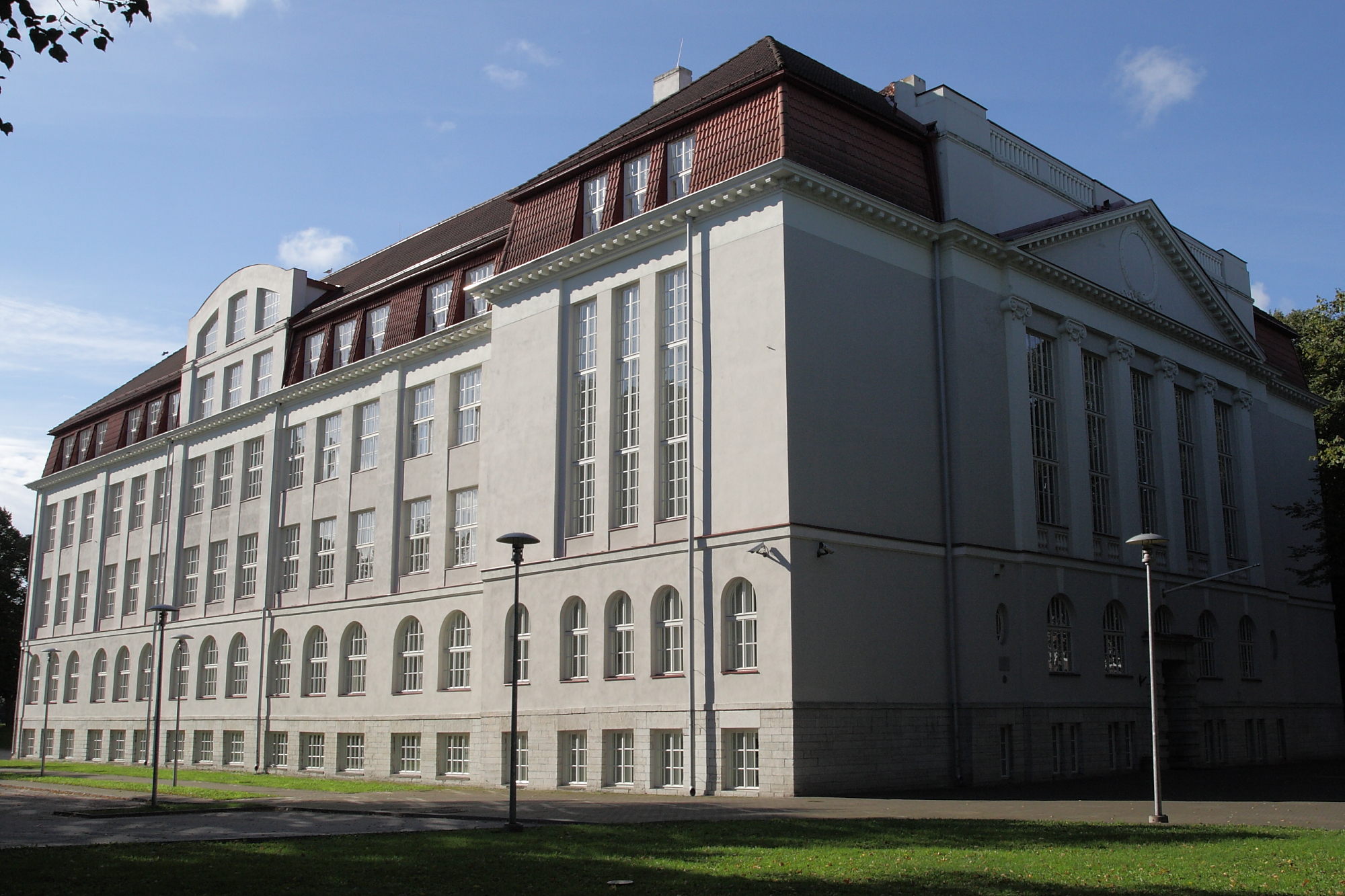
- The main building of the Tallinn School No. 21

Location
- Raua 6 Tallinn, Harjumaa; Estonia; 59.4354°N 24.7664°E

Information
- Type: Public
- Established: 1903
- Principal: Meelis Kond
- Grades: 1–12
- Enrollment: 1385
- Website: Official website

Tallinn School No. 21 is a secondary school in Tallinn, Estonia. The school was founded as the Tallinn kroonualgkool No. 21. The first schoolhouse was a wooden house on J. Poska 6a. In the 1923/24 academic year, as the number of students grew, a new schoolhouse was needed.

The school is a member of the G5 Union of Schools, which comprises what some call the "elite Tallinn city centre schools": Tallinn English College, Tallinn French School, Gustav Adolf Grammar School, Tallinn Secondary School of Science, and Tallinn School No. 21.

== Schoolhouse ==
The schoolhouse is at Raua 6. The architect was Artur Perna. From 2001 to 2003, the schoolhouse was renovated.

== Education ==
The school provides both primary and secondary education. In the secondary stage (gymnasium) students can choose between three tracks: science, English, and social and humanities studies.

== Notable alumni ==
- Sirje Helme
- Maarja-Liis Ilus
- Piret Järvis
- Veiko-Vello Palm
- Märt Põder
- Markus Robam
- Artjom Savitski
- Katrin Siska
- Uku Suviste
- Karl-Erik Taukar
- Urve Tiidus
- Igor Volke
- Evelin Võigemast
