= Bernhard Linde =

Estonian translator, literary scholar and critic (1886–1954)

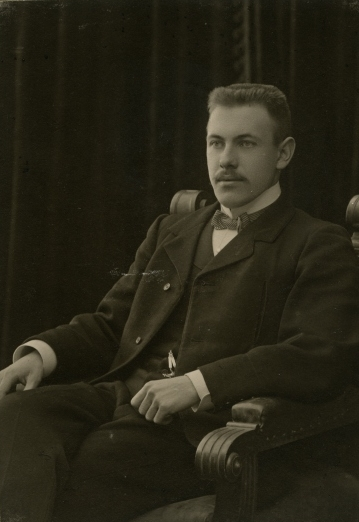
- Linde in 1906
- Born: 4 April 1886; Järvakandi Parish, Russian Empire
- Died: 23 August 1954 (aged 68); Tallinn, then part of Estonian SSR, Soviet Union
- Education: Tartu University
- Occupations: Essayist; literary scholar; translator

Bernhard Linde (pseudonym Pärt Pärn; 4 April 1886 – 23 August 1954) was an Estonian literary and theatre personnel, critic and essayist.

== Biography ==
Linde was born 4 April 1886 in Järvakandi Parish.

In 1927 he graduated from Tartu University in Slavic philology.

Linde was a founding member of the Noor-Eesti group of writers. 1912-1915 he was the chief of Young Estonia's publishing house. During the First World War, he worked as an official of the tsarist army in Minsk and Vilnius. He later stayed at the Estonian settlements in Siberia and the Far East and returned to Estonia in 1919. 1919-1924 Linde was the executive director of the publishing house Varrak which he founded upon his return. 1940-1941 and 1944-1949 he taught at Tallinn University of Technology. In the years of the German occupation, 1941–1944, he stayed on his father’s farm.

Linde was imprisoned in 1951 because of ideological accusations. He spent three years in the prison camps of Narva and Vasalemma, was released in 1954 being terminally ill and died in Tallinn shortly afterwards on 23 August 1954.

== Works ==
- "Heitlikud ilmad" (novel, 1913)
- "Omad ja võõrad" (collection of essays, 1927)
- "Kenad naised" (collection of novels, 1928)
- "Loova Kesk-Euroopa poole" (collection of essays, 1930)
