= Agent M =

Agent M may refer to:

- Agent M (band), Estonian rock group
- Emily Whitehurst (born 1979), American singer, also known as Agent M
- A character portrayed by Michael Jackson in a cameo appearance in the film Men in Black II
- A character portrayed by Tessa Thompson in the film Men in Black: International
