= Ahekõnnu =

Village in Estonia

- Village
- Location within Estonia
- Coordinates: 58°48′N 24°51′E
- Country: Estonia
- County: Rapla County
- Parish: Kehtna Parish

Population (2007)
  - Total: 56
- Time zone: UTC+2 (EET)
  - Summer (DST): UTC+3 (EEST)

Ahekõnnu is a village in Kehtna Parish, Rapla County in northwestern Estonia. It lies to the northeast of Järvakandi town.
