= Vesik =

Family name

Vesik is an Estonian surname. Notable people with the surname include:

- Iiris Vesik (born 1991), Estonian singer and stage actress
- Rivo Vesik (born 1980), Estonian beach volleyball player
