= Igor Volke =

Estonian ufologist (1950–2024)

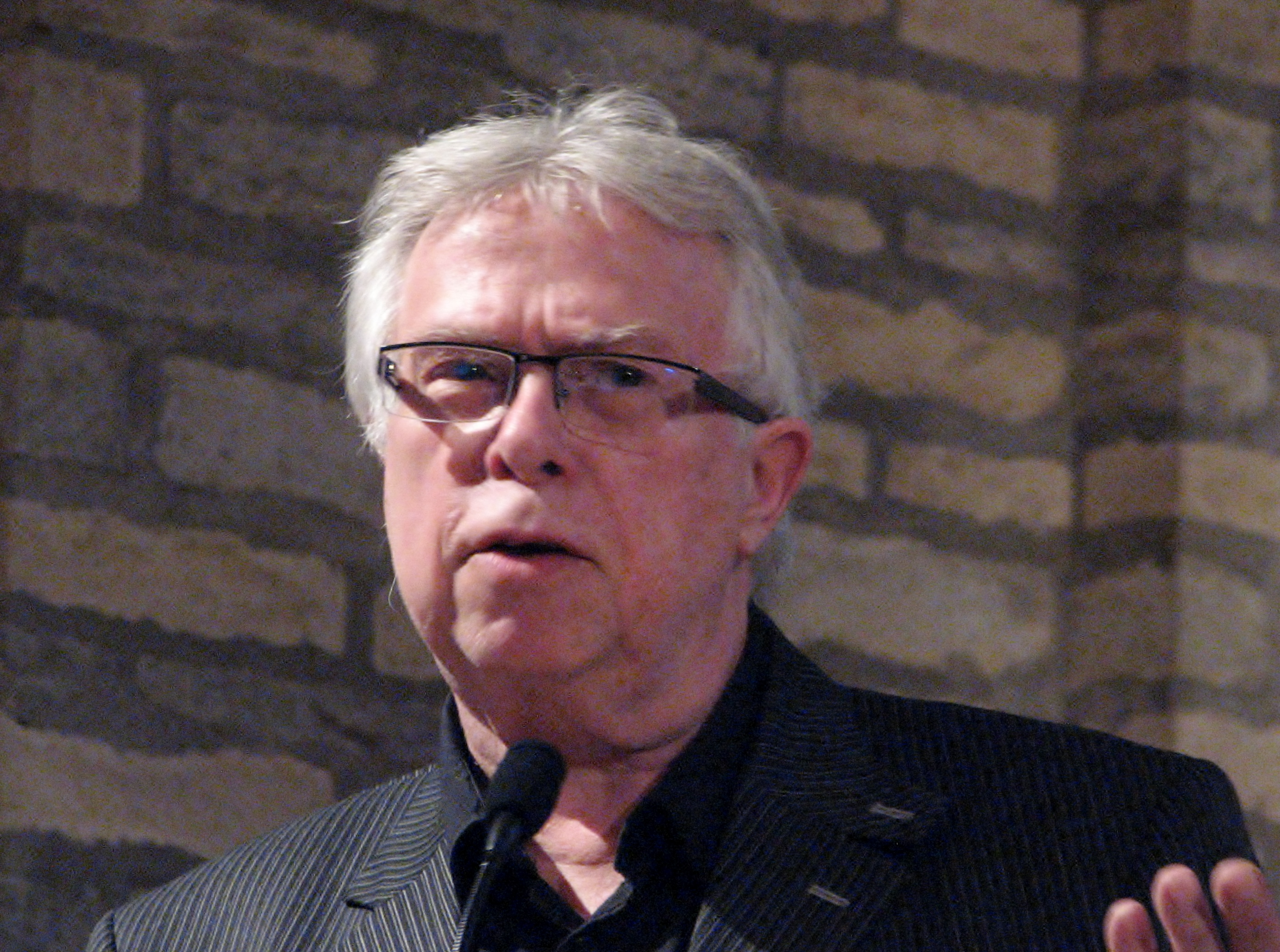
Volke in 2014

Igor Volke (19 January 1950 – 14 November 2024) was an Estonian ufologist and researcher of environmental anomalies.

In 1985 he founded the organization AKRAK (Anomaalsete Keskkonnanähtuste Registreerimise ja Analüüsi Komisjon) for the purpose of collecting reports of anomalous environmental phenomena, particularly UFO reports, throughout Estonia. For a while, it operated in the Tallinn House of Engineers (Estonian: Tallinna Inseneride Maja). AKRAK became inactive and was later replaced by EUFON (Estonian UFO Network).

Volke was born in Jõgeva on 19 January 1950. He graduated from Tallinn School No. 21 in 1968, and Tallinn University of Technology in 1972. He worked in the Tallinn fire department from 1970–2000, and since 2000 worked at the National Library of Estonia as an occupational safety specialist. He was married and had three children. Volke died on 14 November 2024, at the age of 74.

== Works ==
- Volke, Igor (1991). UFO-raamat. Perioodika. p. 95. ISBN 9785797904045.
- Volke, Igor (1998). Ufopäevikud. BNS Kirjastus. p. 301. ISBN 9789985883099.
- Volke, Igor (2017). Täiendatud ufopäevikud. Pilgrim Publishing House. p. 480. ISBN 9789949571949.

The book Ufopäevikud (UFO Diaries) consists mostly of UFO reports from around the world, starting with the 1940s, with special sections at the end for reports from Estonia and Finland.
