= Ans. Andur =

Estonian musical group

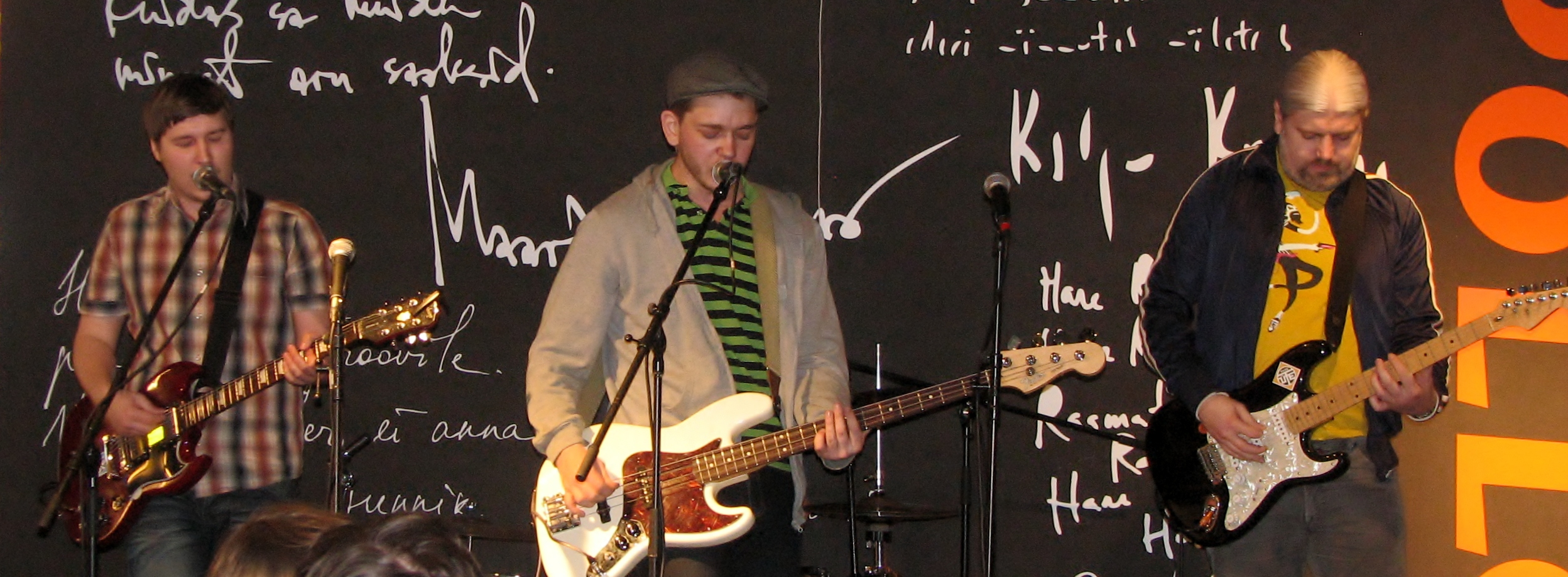
- Ans. Andur performing at the Tallinn Music Week

Background information
- Origin: Paide, Järvamaa, Estonia
- Genres: Indie rock
- Years active: 2002 – present
- Labels: Wuffel Records; Sek Sound; Mortimer Snerd Records
- Members: Madis Aesma; Mihkel Kirss; Gert Pajuväli; Madis Kirss
- Past members: Kaarel Kirss
- Website: Official Website

Ans. Andur is an Estonian indie rock band formed in 2002 in the city of Paide.

== History ==
Madis Aesma and Gert Pajuväli had been partners in Kirssidega Paide Kultuurimaja with Rooza Öökull and PillSkill. But the latter two were losing interest. So Aesma and Pajuväli thought of formation of a bigger band for themselves. The band Ans. Andur eventually included 5 members. Mihkel Kirss and Madis Kirss were brothers and were part of another band in Paide and they soon joined in Ans. Andur in addition to Kaarel Kirss and the original members Madis Aesma and Gert Pajuväli. Andur means detector or transmitter in Estonian and Ans. is an abbreviation from the word "ansambel" Estonian for ensemble. In 2005, Kaarel Kirss left Ans. Andur turning the band into a 4-member band, although Kaarel remained supportive and took part in some of their live performances.

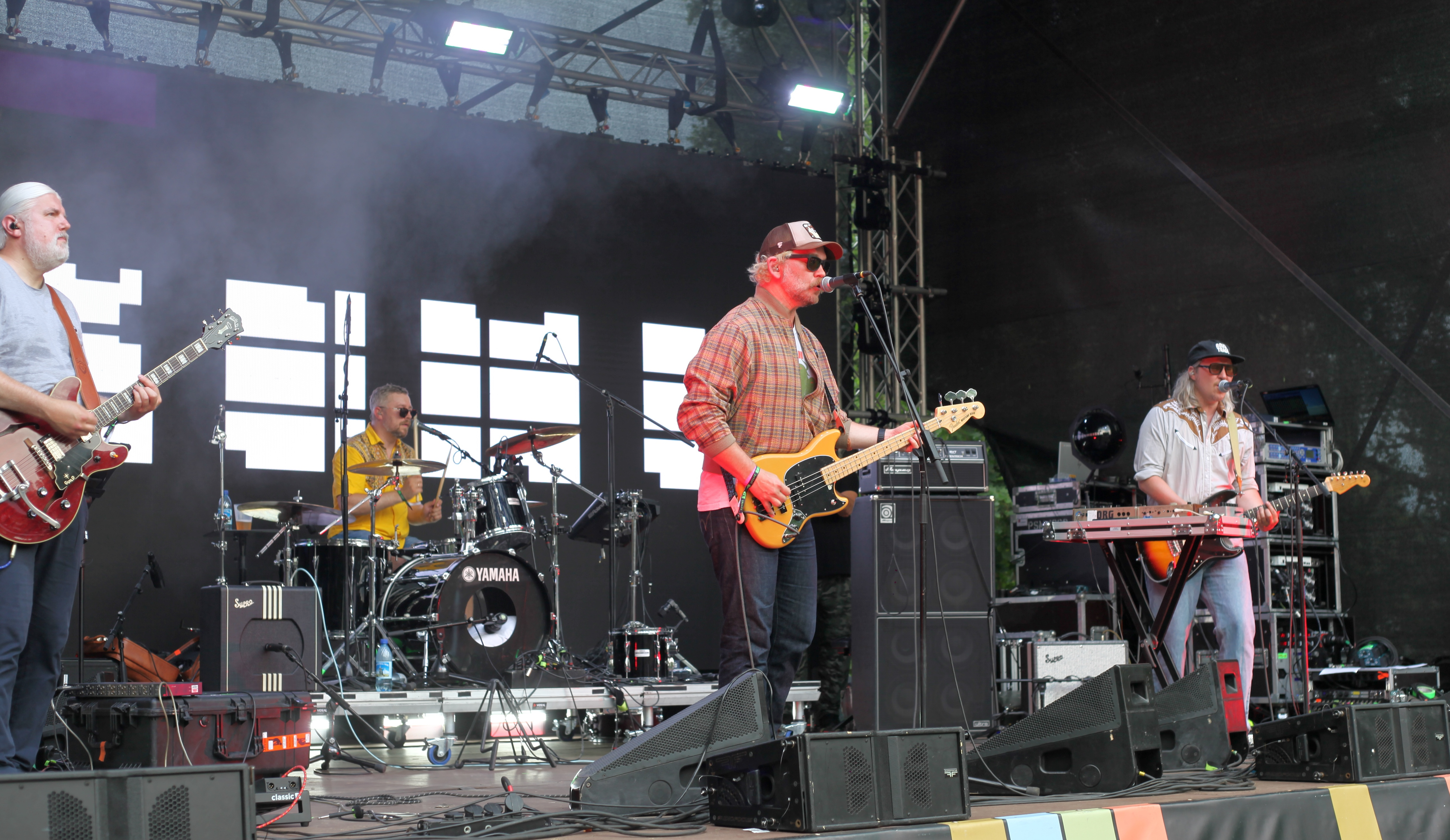
Ans. Andur in Jäneda, Estonia (July 2026)

The first serious attempt of a collaboration between Madis Aesma and Gert Pajuväli was with the demo album with the help of Viljar "Zabe" Saarsalu at the summer residence of Madis Aesma parents in Koordi. Soon they landed concerts and took part in Tartu student band contest. By the time of the success of "Liiklusummikud" taken from album Teie Kangelased, the band had already become a trio and at a later stage into a quintet.

The album 1 peatus enne Viljandi kesklinna was released in 2002. The album "Asfaldilapsed" caught the attention of listeners when it was put online in 2004. Soon they were recording new materials produced by Ivo Etti and recorded at the Estonian Academy of Music studios.

In 2005, the band appeared on Estonian television and also signed with SekSound Records and releasing Tuled Peale in 2005, Topeltvikerkaar in 2007 and Kiletron in 2009 under that label. Kaarel Kirss, a member since 2002 had been credited in the 2005 album Tuled Peale but had left soon after.

On 16 February 2011, the band presented the song "Lapsed ja Lennukid" at Eesti Laul in a bid for representing Estonia in the Eurovision Song Contest in 2011. finishing 9th in the first semi-final in Estonian selections without advancing to the Estonian final. The band also took part in various events, most notably AKEMUASP and had a comeback album Kõverad in 2012.

== Members ==
- Madis Aesma – bass, guitar, vocals
- Mihkel Kirss – guitar, keyboards, vocals
- Gert Pajuväli – guitar, bass
- Madis Kirss – drums, vocals

Past members

- Kaarel Kirss

== Discography ==
=== Studio albums ===
- 2002: Teie kangelased
- 2004: Asfaldilapsed
- 2005: Tuled peale
- 2007: Topeltvikerkaar
- 2009: Kiletron
- 2012: Kõverad
- 2015: Öine Bingo
- 2018: Roheline meri
- 2021: Uus palav päev

=== Compilations ===
- 2002: 1 peatus enne Viljandi kesklinna
- 2007: Kohalik ja kohatu 2: Compilation of Estonian Independent Music
- 2009: Eesti pops
- 2010: Kohalik ja kohatu 3: Compilation of Estonian Independent Music
- 2011: Külmkõlad: 9 heliloomingulist pühendust helilooja Arvo Pärdile
- 2011: Eesti pops 2
