= Mimicry (band) =

Estonian musical group

- Also known as: Kosmosepoiss
- Origin: Estonia
- Genres: Electro-Pop, Synthpop
- Years active: 2004—
- Members: Paul Lepasson
- Past members: Kene Vernik (2004—2012); Timmo Linnas (2004—2011); Kaspar Ehlvest (2004—2009); Jaanus Telvar (2009—2011)
- Website: www.mimicry.ee

Mimicry is an Estonian band. The group currently consists of only one member, Paul Lepasson. He was born in Tartu.

At Eesti Laul 2010 the band took part in the contest with the song "New". The song was written by Timmo Linnas, Kaspar Ehlvest, Ivar Kaine, Kene Vernik and Paul Lepasson. In the final they achieved 851 votes and 8 place.

At Eesti Laul 2011 the band took part in the contest with the song "The Storm", which reached 10 place (885 votes) in final and 4th place in semi-final. The song was written by Paul Lepasson, Timmo Linnas, Kene Vernik, Jaanus Telvar.

At Eesti Laul 2012 the band took part in the contest with the song "The Destination", which reached the semifinals in its sixth place (1,086 votes). The song was written by Paul Lepasson itself. In 2012 Kene Vernik left the group.

== Discography ==
=== EPs ===
- 2012: Discipline

=== Singles ===
- 2013: Mistakes
- 2015: Felt Like Walking
