= Hollow Coves =

Australian band

- Origin: Gold Coast, Queensland, Australia
- Genre: Indie folk
- Years active: 2013–present
- Members: Ryan Henderson; Matt Carins
- Website: hollowcoves.com

Hollow Coves are an Australian indie folk duo, formed in Brisbane in 2013 and now based in Gold Coast, Queensland. The founding members are Ryan Henderson and Matt Carins, who alternate as lead vocalists and share songwriting duties. Their 2021 single “Coastline” was certified gold in America, Australia and Canada. In 2026, Hollow Coves were named "Export Artist of the Year" in the Queensland Music Awards.

== Band history ==
=== 2014–2015 Early years ===
Henderson and Carins were introduced by a mutual friend in 2013. They wrote three songs together: "The Woods,” “Home,” and “Heatwave,” uploading the tracks to SoundCloud in 2014. In 2015, Louis Tomlinson of One Direction shared the music on Twitter, encouraging followers to "have a look."

Following the songs’ early online pops on Spotify, SoundCloud and social media, Henderson left his job as a civil engineer and Carins left his work as a carpenter to pursue music full-time. Hollow Coves told Triple J's Unearthed they were blown away as they were getting "50,000 plays a day."

At the time, Henderson was in Canada on a working holiday and Carins was traveling in Europe. They reunited in Toronto, where they wrote “Coastline,” and the rest of the songs that would become Wanderlust.

=== 2016–2018: Wanderlust ===
Hollow Coves released their debut EP, Wanderlust, in 2017 through Nettwerk. The release drew on travel experiences and reflections on landscapes from the duo’s earlier years. The single, "Coastline," won the 2018 Gold Coast Music Awards for "Best Song" and Hollow Coves won for "Breakout Artist."

Hollow Coves toured with Tom Walker in 2018, leading up to the Live at Leeds Festival.

=== 2019–2020: Moments ===
In 2019, Hollow Coves released their debut studio album, Moments. The album was recorded in Devon, England, with producer Chris Bond. Billboard Magazine noted Hollow Coves' “stunning harmonies,” and Clash Magazine said that Moments evokes “an atmospheric wanderlust to life.” The Sunday Times named Hollow Coves a breakout act and described Moments as “songs that belong on the same shelf as Jackson Browne, Arcade Fire and early Ben Howard.”

=== 2021–2022: Blessings ===
During the COVID-19 pandemic, Carins and Henderson relocated to the Gold Coast and built a home studio, where they self-produced the EP, Blessings, released in 2021. The Backbeat Podcast said that Blessings "conveys the admiration, awe and ease that comes to those who look to the natural world for guidance and comfort in troubling times."

=== 2023–present: Nothing to Lose ===
In 2023, Hollow Coves opened for the Lumineers and Passenger. Their sophomore studio album Nothing to Lose was released In January 2024, with Australian ARIA-winning producer Matt Corby. Montreal Rocks called Nothing to Lose "a soothing balm to our modern anxieties."

In tandem with the release, Hollow Coves collaborated with National Park Foundation in the United States, donating one dollar from each ticket sold. They performed “On The Way” from the album on the Kelly Clarkson Show, in a segment filmed at Zion Canyon Mesa in support of the NPF.

Hollow Coves have performed at numerous festivals such as SOMMO Fest 2025, Open Air Gampel 2025, Corona Capital Festival 2025, Lalala Festival 2024, and Osheaga Festival 2023.

In 2024, Hollow Coves won Artist of the Year and Release of the Year for Nothing To Lose in the Gold Coast Music Awards.

In 2026, Queensland Music Awards awarded Hollow Coves "Export of The Year."

== Discography ==
=== Albums ===
Title	Details
Moments	Released: 18 October 2019; Format: digital; Label: Nettwerk/AWAL
Nothing to Lose	Released: 1 March 2024; Format: LP, CD, digital; Label: Nettwerk/AWAL

=== EPs ===
Title	Details
Drifting	Released: 2014; Format: Digital; Label: Hollow Coves
Wanderlust	Released: February 2017; Format: LP, CD, Digital; Label: Nettwerk/AWAL
Blessings	Released: June 2021; Format: LP, Digital; Label: Nettwerk/AWAL

== Awards ==
=== Environmental Music Prize ===
The Environmental Music Prize is a quest to find a theme song to inspire action on climate and conservation. It commenced in 2022.

Year	Nominee / work	Award	Result	Ref.
2025	"On the Way"	Environmental Music Prize	Nominated	

=== Gold Coast Music Awards ===
Year	Nominee / work	Award	Result (win only)	Ref.
2018	"Coastline"	Song of the Year	Won	
2018	Hollow Coves	Breakout Artist of the Year	Won	
2024	Hollow Coves	Artist of the Year	Won	
2024	Nothing to Lose	Release of the Year	Won	

=== Queensland Music Awards ===
The Queensland Music Awards (previously known as Q Song Awards) are annual awards celebrating Queensland, Australia's brightest emerging artists and established legends. They commenced in 2006.

Year	Nominee / work	Award	Result (wins only)	Ref.
2026	Hollow Caves	Export Achievement Award	awarded	
