= Night Tapes =

Dream pop band

Night Tapes is a UK-Estonian dream pop band based in London. The members are Iiris Vesik (Estonia), Max Doohan (UK), and Sam Richards (UK), who began jamming together as housemates in South London in the late 2010s resulting in their first release Dream Forever in Glorious Stereo (2019). Their band name comes from these evening jam sessions.

Their latest release is their debut LP portals//polarities, released 26 September 2025.

== Discography ==
Studio Albums

- portals//polarities (2025)

EPs

- Dream Forever in Glorious Stereo (2019)
- Download Spirit (2020)
- Dream Forever in Glorious Stereo + Download Spirit (Double EP, 2023)
- Perfect Kindness (2023)
- assisted memories (2024)

Singles

- "Humans" (2022)
- "drifting" (2023)
- "Humans" (Franc Moody Remix, 2023)
- "Projections" (2024)
- "drifting" (Laurence Guy Remix, 2024)
- "to be free" (2024)
- "to be free" (Benjamin Damage Remix, 2024)
- "babygirl (like no1 else)" (2025)
- "pacifico" (2025)
- "helix" (2025)
- "storm" (2025)
- "swordsman" (2025)
- "drifting" (kryptogram Remix, 2026)
- “swim” (2026)
