= Menwhopause =

Indian rock band

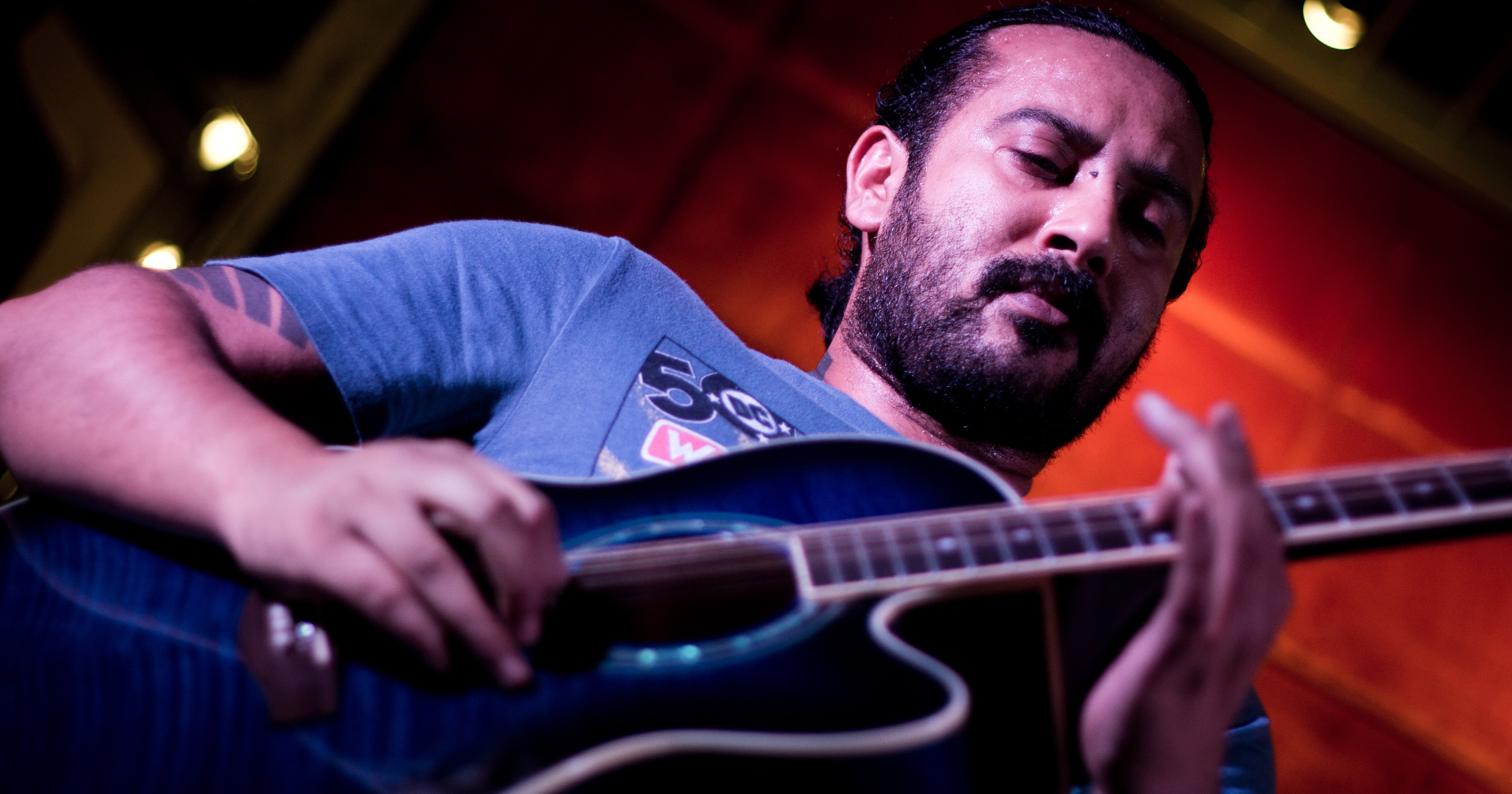
- menwhopause Live at Hard Rock Cafe, Pune

Background information
- Origin: Delhi, India
- Genres: Alternative rock Acoustic rock
- Years active: 2001 – 2018
- Label: EMI-Virgin
- Members: Sarabjit Singh; Anup Kutty; Shiv Ankit Ahuja; Randeep Singh
- Website: www.menwhopause.co

Menwhopause is a rock band based in Delhi, India.

== Early career ==
Guitarist Anup Kutty with an original lineup of singer/songwriter Sarabjit Chadha and acoustic guitarist Inder Pal Singh (IP) formed the band in 2001. The trio became a full-fledged band after recruiting bassist Randeep Singh and drummer Rahul Chatterjee. In a country where popular music was dominated with commercial Bollywood music and the live rock music scene was generally full of cover bands, menwhopause stuck to playing original compositions and were one of the first bands in India to distribute their music for free over the Internet. Their first EP called ‘The story begins...’ was released online as a free download in 2003. Ever since its formation, the band has gone through a few line-up changes - the first with original drummer Rahul Chatterjee being replaced by Hemendra Nath "Hemzi" in 2008 and later with French drummer Paul Schneiter till 2012 and then with Bhanu Thakur in 2014. Guitarist IP Singh left the band in 2016.

The band has released four albums since 2001 and has been instrumental in shaping the independent music scene in India primarily through their DIY ethic.

== Albums and Work ==
In 2006, they released their first full-length album Home on their own record label, "The Middle Earth Company". The album gained the band international recognition, making them the first Indian rock band to be invited to perform at the SXSW festival in Austin, Texas. The band's tour was sponsored by the Indian Centre for Cultural Relations (ICCR), which made them the first ever rock band to be supported by the cultural arm of the Government of India. The band also did a month long tour of the southwestern United States playing in around 10 cities in and around Texas. In February 2008, the band won an online poll for the Best Band of the Year 2007 conducted by Jack Daniel's in India. In April 2008 the band flew to Lynchburg, Tennessee where they performed at the Legendary Mash Festival and worked with R.E.M.'s producer David Barbe. The band signed a major record deal with EMI-Virgin Records (India) in 2008 to release their second full-length album Easy. Instead of conventional studio recording, the band began work on the album by recording the tracks in a makeshift studio set up by them in a village in Uttaranchal, nestled in the Himalayas, during September 2006. The album took four years to be produced with the band bringing in mixing engineer and co-producer Miti Adhikari (BBC London) and Grammy Award-winning mastering engineer, Richard Dodd. The album was initially released on digital format through iTunes and Amazon.com in early-January 2011 followed by physical CD format on 26 January 2011. The album immediately received favorable reviews by critics with The Times of India calling it "by far, one of the most brilliant works from an Indian rock act." Easy has been No.1 on music stores sales charts in Mumbai, Delhi- March 2011.

In 2012, the band conducted a 15-day music workshop in Tihar Jail - the largest prison complex in South Asia. The workshop culminated with a group of inmates forming a band called The Flying Souls and performing with menwhopause at a special concert held inside the prison premises exclusively for the other inmates.

As pioneers of the independent music scene of India, menwhopause has been at the forefront of artistic innovation. This shows in the passion that they have put behind supporting the independent artists. In 2011, they founded the Ziro Festival of Music in Ziro Valley of Arunachal Pradesh, which is one of India's premier outdoor music festival and has hosted acclaimed artists such as Steve Shelley and Lee Ronaldo (Sonic Youth) and Shye-Ben Tzur. The festival focuses on the rich cultural heritage of the whole North-East and has put Ziro in the global map.

The band recorded their third album Neon Delhi between 2013 and 2016, releasing it independently on January 4, 2017. Neon Delhi features collaborations with various musicians across genres like GFD - a Rajasthani khamancha trio, jazz pianist Grant Richards, YouTube sensation Faadu Rapper and poet/musician Jeet Thayil.

== Discography ==
- The Story Begins... (EP) (2003) The Middle Earth Company
- Home (2006) The Middle Earth Company
- Easy (2011) EMI-Virgin Records (India)
- Neon Delhi (2017)
- Binge Walking (2020)

== Etymology ==
The name Menwhopause was borrowed from Anup's quiz team in college that went by the same name. The band has always maintained that the pun was actually unintentional and they were more interested in the word pause being part of the band's name. In recent interviews, the band has been quoted giving different origins of the name. Some of them include a tyre company in Brazil, tattooed fans and an attribution to Randeep's mother.
