= Gisela Fullà-Silvestre =

- Also known as: NOIA
- Born: Barcelona
- Years active: 2016–present
- Label: Cascine

Gisela Fullà-Silvestre, who records as NOIA, is a Brooklyn-based musician and sound designer who has released two EPs.

== Career ==
Gisela Fullà-Silvestre was born in Barcelona and graduated from Berklee School of Music with a degree in film scoring and sound design. She is based in Brooklyn.

Fullà-Silvestre released her debut EP, Habits, as NOIA in October 2016. Among its songs, "Nostalgia del Futuro" is about idealizing a future that can never arrive. Its video was directed by Laura Martinova in Barcelona's historic neighborhoods. Fullà-Silvestre released her second EP, Crisàlida (Catalan for "chrysalis"), on Cascine in May 2019. The four-track EP was among Stereogum's favorites in 2019 and two of its tracks, "Ausencias" and "Ciudad del Humo", were among its top tracks of the week. "Ciudad del Humo" was released with a video. The album is based on feelings of "heartbreak for what didn't happen" and "feeling trapped" in New York City.
