= Agent M (band) =

Estonian musical group

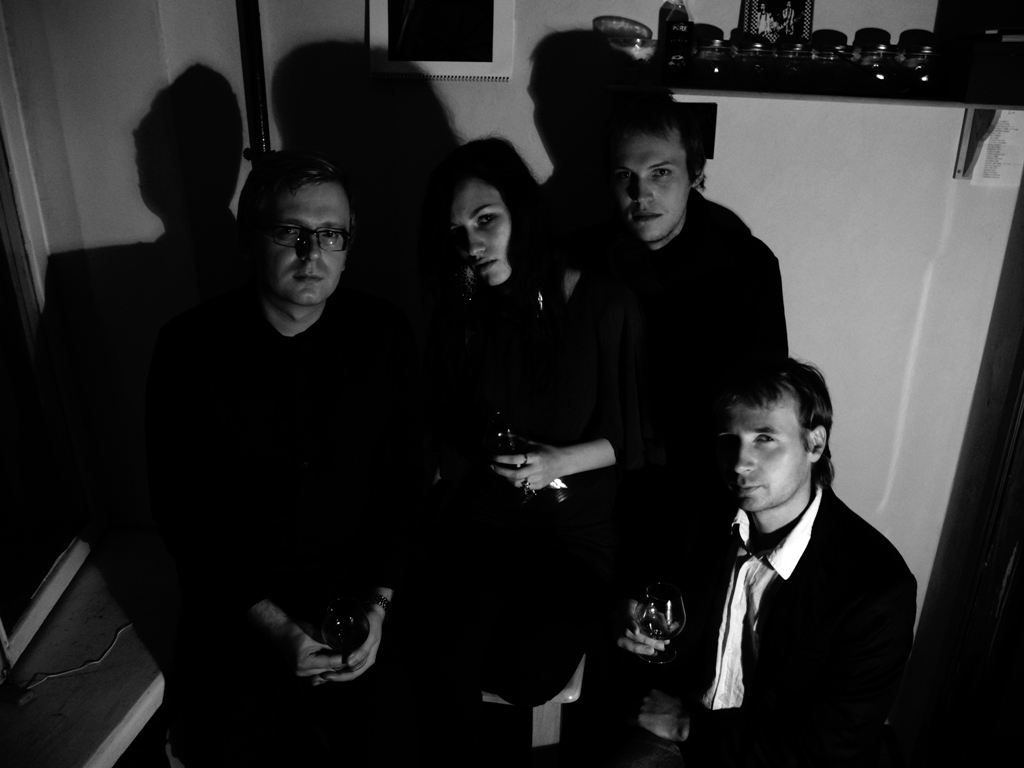
- Members of Agent M in 2011.

Background information
- Origin: Harjumaa, Tallinn, Estonia
- Genres: Alternative rock, new wave
- Years active: 2004–2009; 2011–2012
- Labels: Kulundpea
- Past members: Reilika Saks; Marten Vill; Reimo Va; Taago Piisang; Merili Varik; Andres "Mõmmi" Aru; Jarmo "Chopper" Nuutre; Mihkel Kupits; Margus Tammela; Andrus Kanter; Märten Rodes; Ivan "Charlie" Korshunov

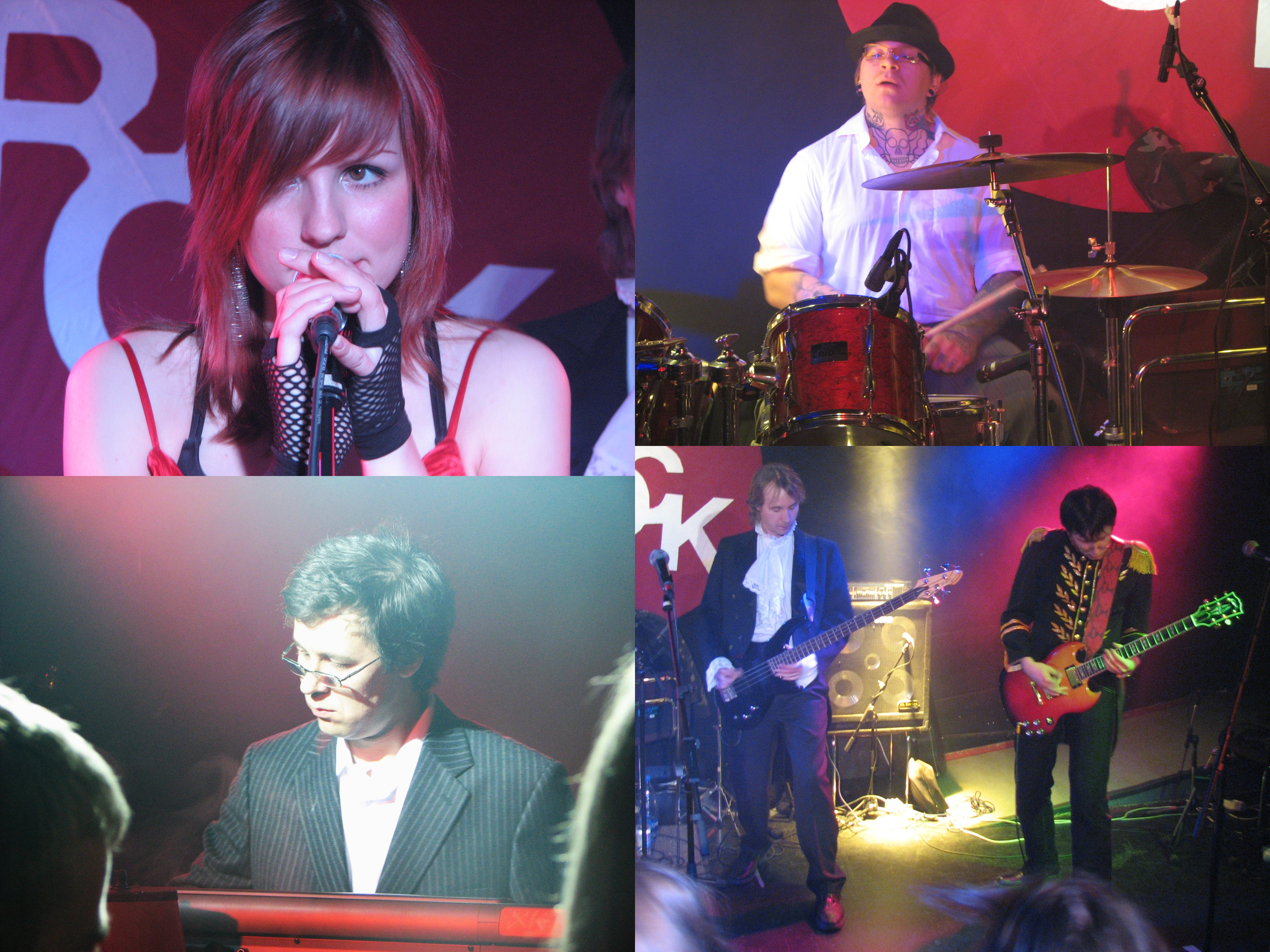
Members of Agent M photographed performing in Jyrock Festival in Jyväskylä, Finland

Agent M is an Estonian alternative rock group with new wave and post-punk influences. Their songs are sung in Estonian and English.

Agent M started as a studio project of guitarist Marten Vill and a female singer Merili Varik in late 2004. Singles "7 Surmapattu" and "Kus on mu kodu" gained attention by local radios and a full live band was formed.

The band has released five videos and two of them entered the MTV Baltic playlists. In spring 2007, Agent M was announced as the winner of Baltic New Music Chart. The band released an EP "Šokolaad" (Chocolate) in 2006 and a full album Spionaaž (Espionage) in 2007. Band was disbanded in the autumn 2009.

== Reformation and separation ==
In the end of September 2011, Agent M announced new concert dates, thus returning to the music scene. The new lineup includes original members Marten Vill, Reimo Va and new faces Reilika Saks as the lead singer and Taago Piisang on drums. Band's music shifted strongly towards more aggressive post-punk influenced sound with less emphasis on keyboards.

In December 2012 the group is disbanded.

== Discography ==
- 2006: "Šokolaad" (EP, self-released)
- 2007: "Väike tüdruk" (single, Kulundpea Records)
- 2007: Spionaaž (album, Kulundpea Records)
- 2012: "Minu koer ei hammusta" (EP, self-released) - free download from bands web page
