= Iiris =

Estonian singer

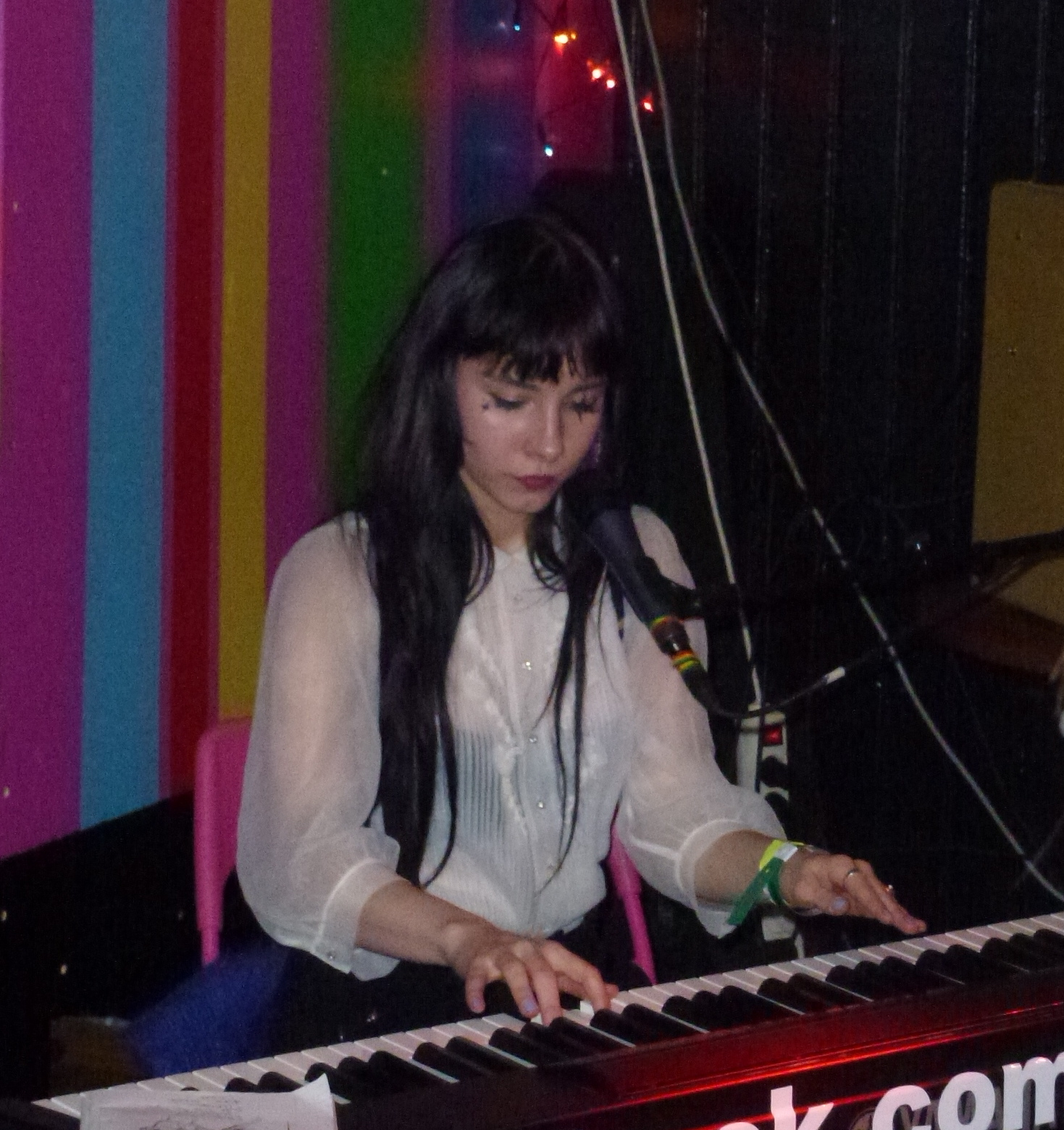
- Iiris performing at Iceland Airwaves in 2011

Background information
- Born: Iiris Vesik; 16 July 1991 (age 35); Tallinn, Estonia
- Genres: Pop; dream pop; electropop
- Occupations: Singer; songwriter; actress
- Instruments: Vocals; piano; flute
- Years active: 2003–present
- Label: Universal Music Finland
- Member of: Night Tapes
- Website: iirismusic.com

Iiris Vesik (born 16 July 1991), better known as simply Iiris, is an Estonian singer, songwriter, and stage actress. Her debut album, The Magic Gift Box, was released in March 2012 under EMI Music Finland. She is also a member and the main singer of the group Night Tapes.

== Life and career ==
=== Early life ===
Vesik began attending Jakob Westholmi Gümnaasium in 1998, and later graduated in 2010. She has a younger brother and two younger half-sisters.

She began her music career after placing third in the Estonian singing competition Tähtede laul in 2003. Vesik went on to place third again in the televised Estonian singing competition Kaks Takti Ette in 2007.

=== Music career ===
Vesik has competed to represent Estonia in the Eurovision Song Contest on three occasions. In 2008, her song "Ice-Cold Story", written by Riine Pajusaar, placed second in the Eurolaul competition. In 2010 she returned with the self-composed song "Astronaut", placing fourth in the Eesti Laul competition. In 2016, along with Cartoon, Kerli & Kristel Aaslaid she was one of the writers for "Immortality" performed by Cartoon and Kristel Aaslaid at Eesti Laul 2016. She competed with Agoh in Eesti Laul 2018 with the song “Drop That Boogie” and placed 5th in the final.

Iiris rose to greater prominence in 2010, after the showcase festival Tallinn Music Week. Dietmar Schwenger of the MusikWoche praised the “Especially good performance and great songwriting”. Invitations from festivals like Popkomm (Germany), Musiikki & Media (Finland), The Great Escape (UK), Positivus (Latvia) and Iceland Airwaves (Iceland) followed.

At the beginning of 2011 Iiris became the artist of the week on MTV Iggy’s blog.

Iiris has been accoladed for her eclecticism, intelligence, innovation and pop sound.

Iiris was signed to EMI Finland in June 2011. Her debut album The Magic Gift Box, produced by Ago Teppand (a.k.a. Sethh), was released on 28 March 2012.

Iiris is often compared to Estonian pop singer Kerli, and they are both fans of each other.

After Universal Music Group bought EMI, Iiris has been releasing her songs on Universal Music Finland.

== Musical style ==
Iiris is frequently compared to artists such as Björk, Florence & The Machine, Kate Bush, Kerli and Regina Spektor.

== Discography ==
Studio albums

- The Magic Gift Box (2012, EMI Music Finland/Virgin Records)
- portals//polarities (Night Tapes, 2025)

EPs

- Chinaberry Girl (2013, Universal Music Group)
- Hope (2016, Dreamweaver)
- Dream Forever In Glorious Stereo (2019) (with Night Tapes)
- Download Spirit (2020) (with Night Tapes)
- Perfect Kindness (2023) (with Night Tapes)
- Assisted memories (2024) (with Night Tapes)

Singles

- "Ice-Cold Story" (Audiosus, 2007)
- "Alien" (Rockhouse, 2008)
- "Astronaut" (Sethh Sound, 2010)
- "Melyse" (EMI Music Finland, 2011)
- "Weirdo" (EMI Music Finland, 2012)
- "Tigerhead" (Universal Music Finland, 2013)
- "Iiridescent Love" (Hand In Hive U.K, 2015)
- "Hope" (Dreamweaver, 2016)
- "Stranger" (Dreamweaver, 2017)
- "Drifting" (Night Tapes, 2023)
- "Projections" (Night Tapes, 2024)

== Awards and nominations ==
Year	Nominee / work	Award	Result
2010	Herself	Skype "Go Change The World Award" @ TMW	Won
2012	"Melyse"	Estonian Music Award for Best Music Video	Nominated
2013	The Magic Gift Box	Estonian Music Award for Best Album	Nominated
2013	The Magic Gift Box	Estonian Music Award for Best Debut Album	Nominated
2013	The Magic Gift Box	Estonian Music Award for Best Pop Album	Nominated
2013	Herself	Estonian Music Award for Best Female Artist	Won
2013	"Weirdo"	Estonian Music Award for Best Music Video	Nominated
2014	"Tigerhead"	Estonian Music Award for Best Music Video	Won
