= Jaan Pehk =

Estonian musician and author

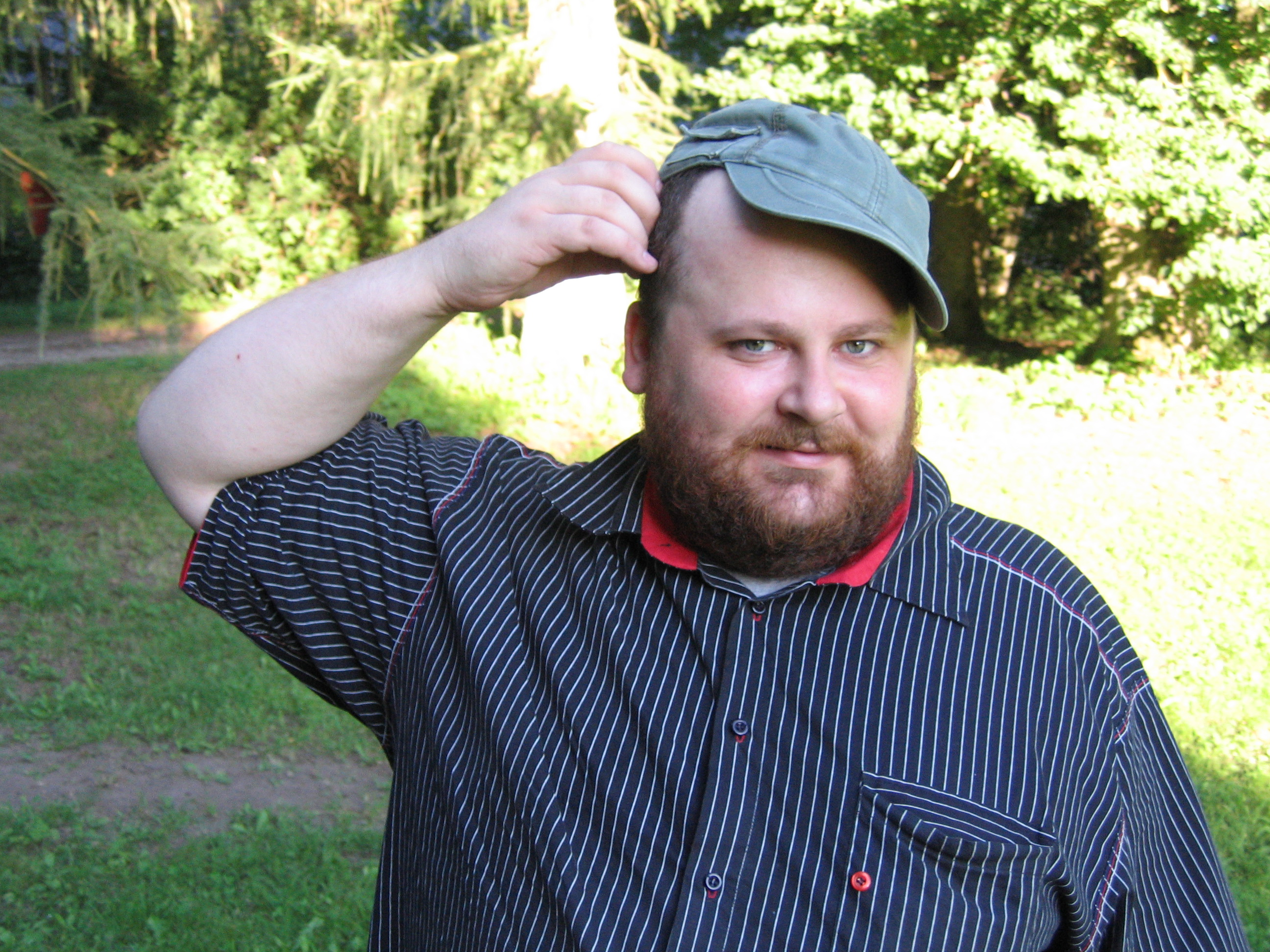
Jaan Pehk in 2008

Jaan Pehk (also known as Orelipoiss; born 13 June 1975 in Palivere) is an Estonian writer, singer and guitarist.

Pehk is a member of the Young Authors' Association in Tartu and the Estonian Writers' Union.

== Discography ==
=== Collaborations ===
Claire's Birthday

- Venus (2000)
- City Loves (2001)
- Future Is Now (2003)

Koer

- Pure (2004)

Köök

- Telegramm (2006)

Orelipoiss

- Ma olen terve (2004)
- Vana mees (2004)
- Naisi (2005)
- Üheksakümmendüheksa (2007)
- Õnn (2010)
- Sünnipäev (2018)
