= Järvakandi =

Borough in Estonia

- Borough
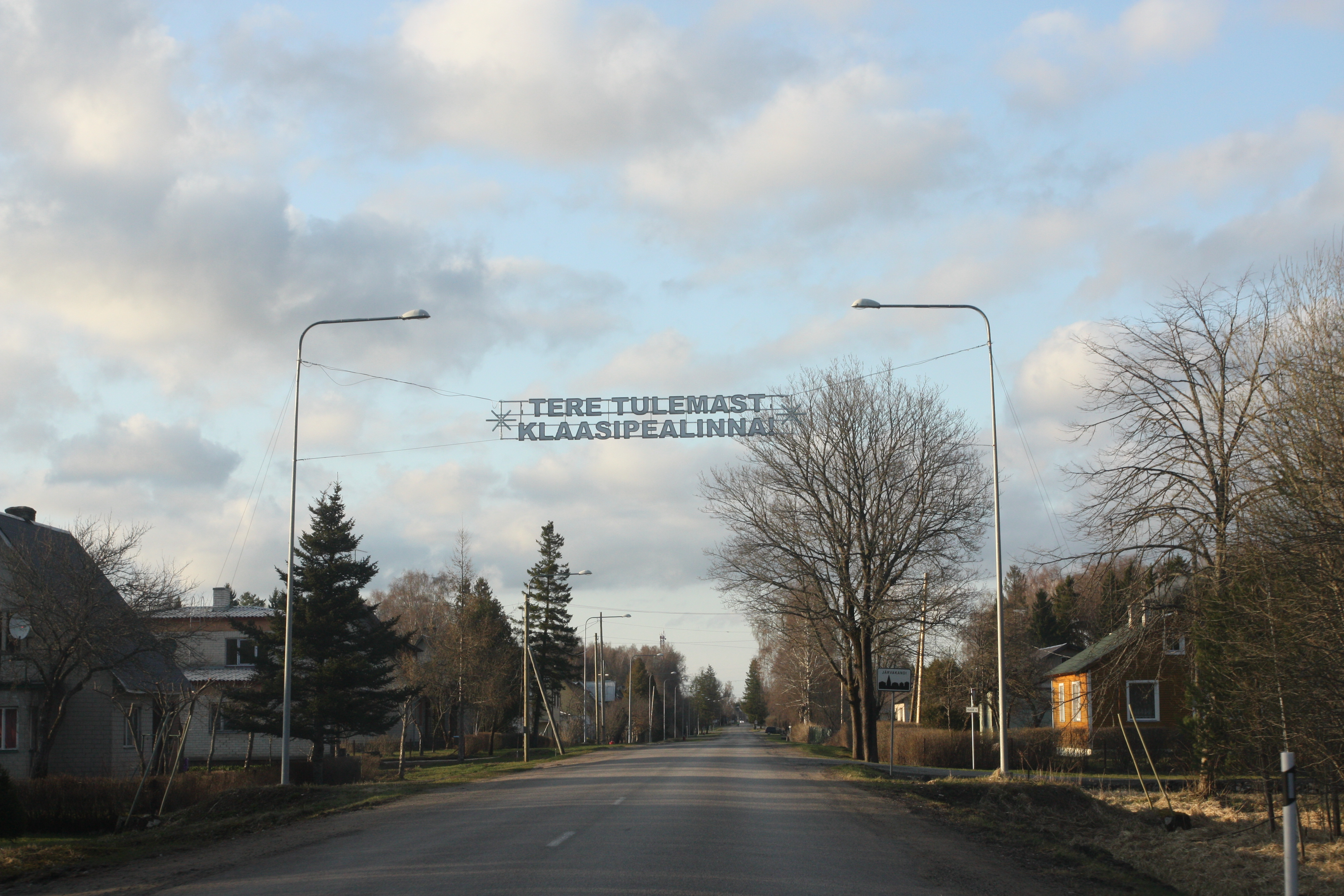

- Location in Estonia
- Coordinates: 58°46′32″N 24°48′35″E
- Country: Estonia
- County: Rapla County
- Municipality: Kehtna Parish

Area
  - Total: 4.83 km^{2} (1.86 sq mi)

Population (01.01.2012)
  - Total: 1,375
  - Density: 285/km^{2} (737/sq mi)

Järvakandi (German: Jerwakant) is a borough (Estonian: alev) in central Estonia. Administratively it constituted Järvakandi Parish (Järvakandi vald) until 2017 — a rural municipality within Rapla County. After the 2017 reforms of municipalities, it is now located in Kehtna Parish. The municipality had a population of 1,375 as of January 2012 and an area of 4.83 km^{2}.

The rock music festival Rabarock was held in Järvakandi from 2005 to 2012.

== Gallery ==
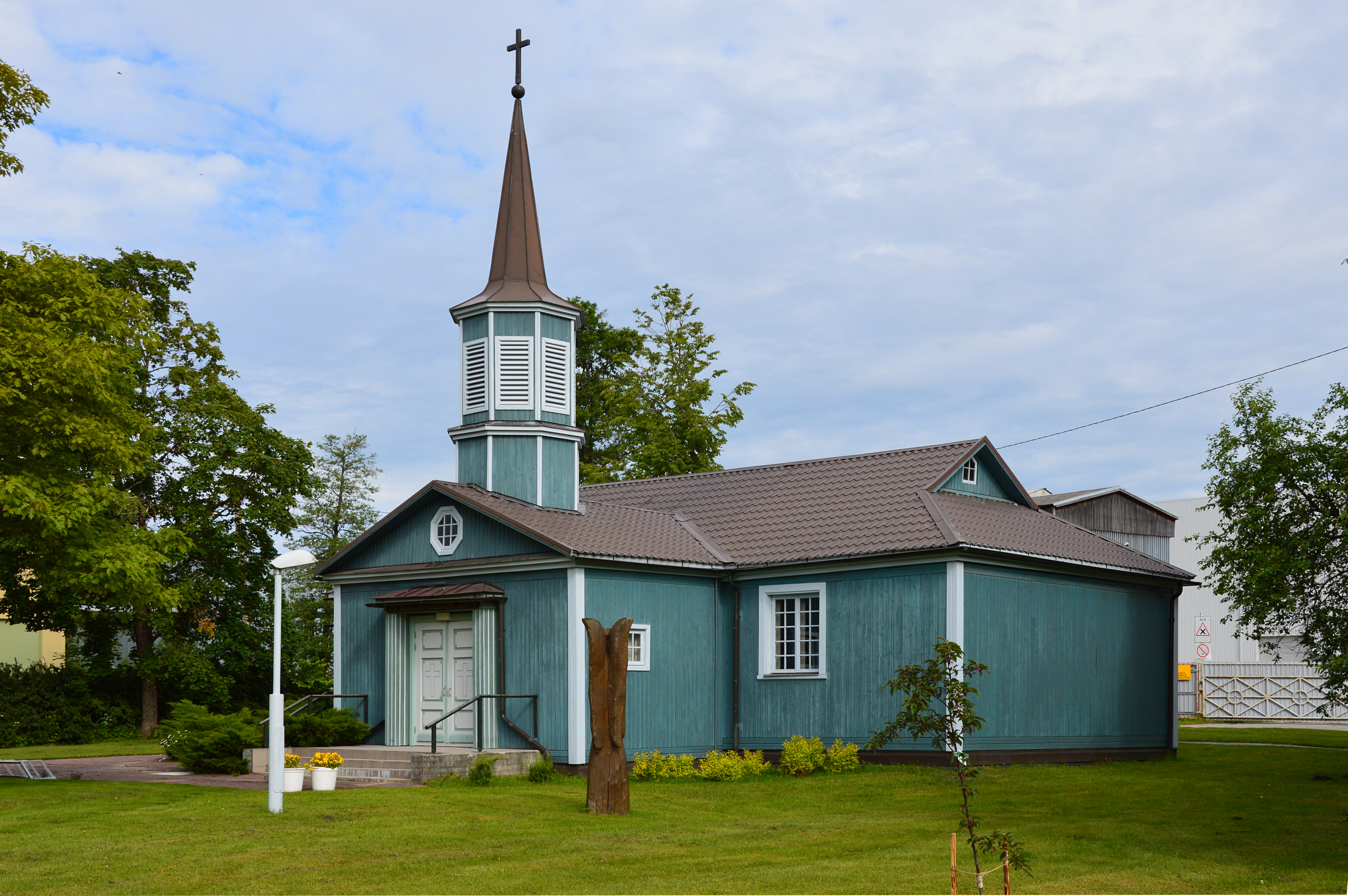
St. Paul's Estonian Evangelical Lutheran Church in Järvakandi

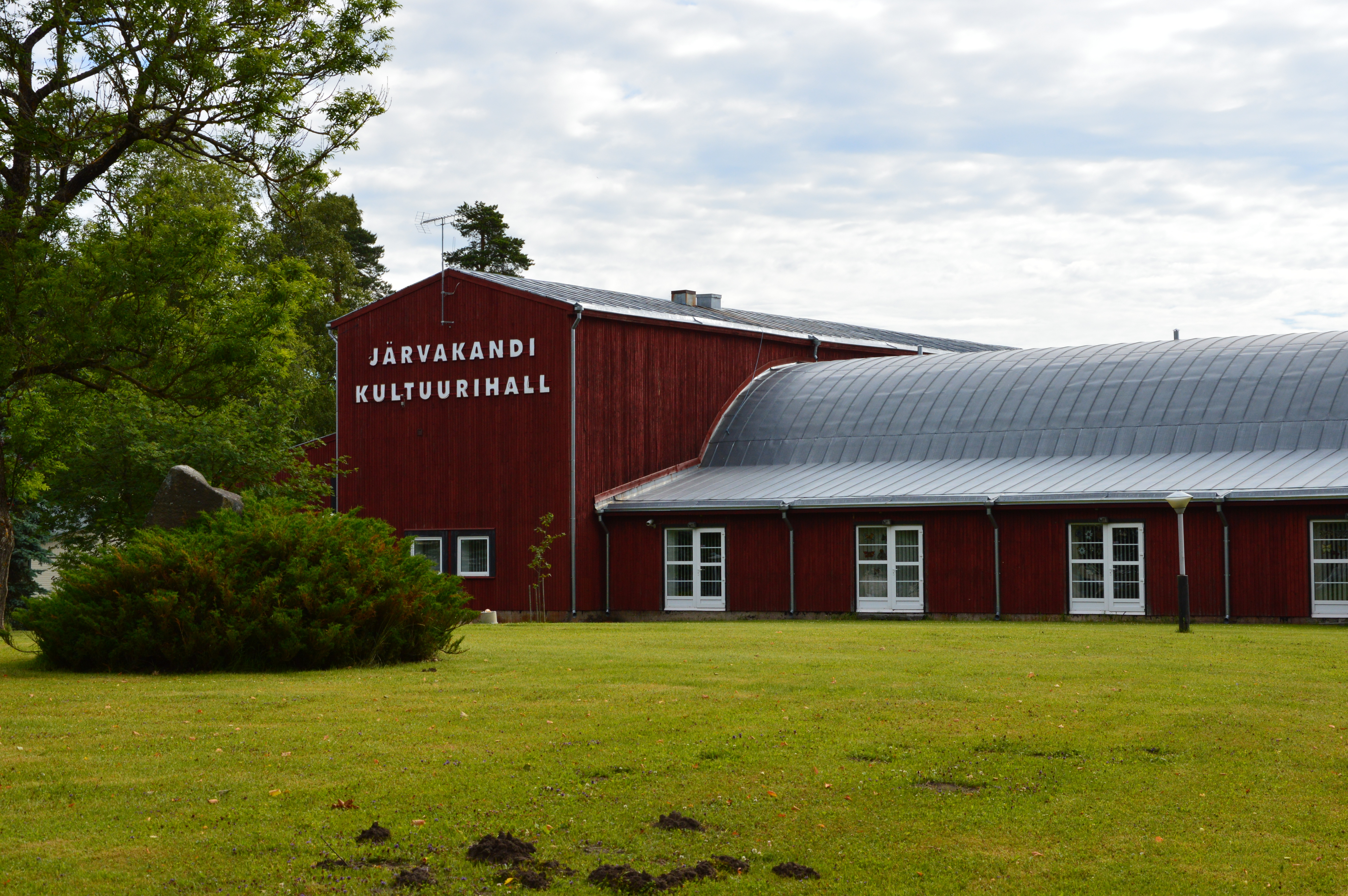
Järvakandi cultural centre
