= Markus Robam =

Estonian composer and singer songwriter (born 1991)

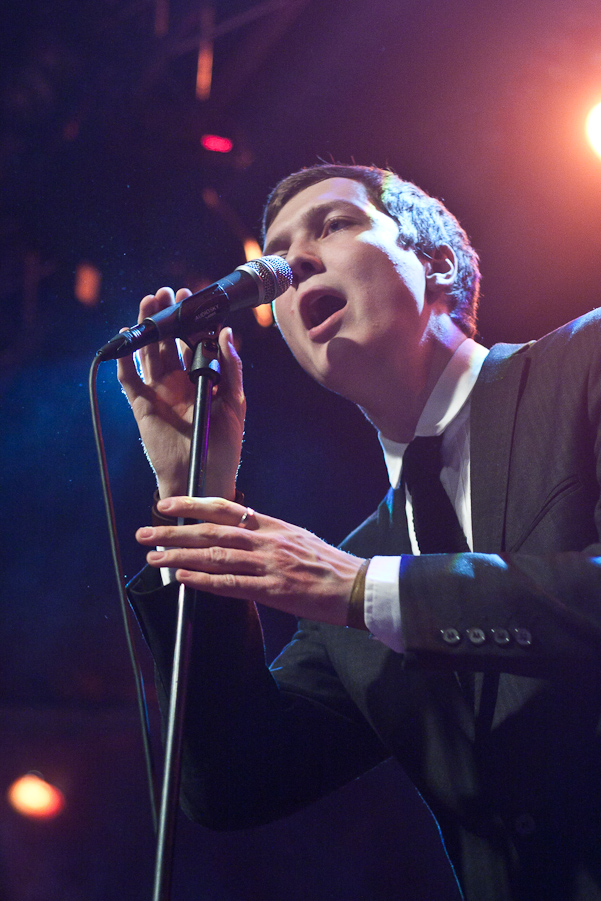

Background information
- Born: 11 February 1991 (age 35); Viljandi, Estonia
- Occupations: Singer-songwriter; musician; artist; composer; actor
- Instruments: vocals; guitar; piano; keyboards

Markus Robam (born 11 February 1991) is an Estonian composer and singer songwriter. He has released three studio albums "Astir", "Monogram" and "In Crowds". Robam has been featured on festivals "Fundamento", Tallinn Music Week, Estonian Music Days, festival Pulsar in Copenhagen, festival "Segnali" in Perugia and “Nuova Consonanza” Festival in Rome, Italy.

Robam has written original music for TV series, theatre and movies.

He was the lead singer and principal songwriter of the alternative pop band MID and participated in the Estonian Song Contest 2011 with their debut single "Smile". Robam has taken part in composing competitions in Austria and the United States. Robam has performed as a solo artist Tojj.

Markus Robam, a two-time Kuldmuna laureate, composed the soundtracks for the award-winning campaigns Estonian Music Day (2020) and Born in the Heart by Taevas Ogilvy (2019).

He studied audiovisual composition in the Estonian Academy of Music and Theatre and is a member of Estonian Composers' Union since 2015.

In 2012, Markus starred as Melchior Gabor in the Estonian original production of the musical Spring Awakening. He has co-starred as Markus Moorits in "Kutsar koputab kolm korda" by Elo Selirand in 2010 and as Ingmar in TV Series "Class: Life after".

Robam has written original music for short movie productions in Baltic Film, Media, Arts and Communication School.

He was the author of sound and music design and wrote original music for the opening ceremony of Estonian National Museum in 2016.

== Television ==
In addition to writing the original theme song for Kahekõne Robam also wrote the theme songs for Pöörijoon, Rula ja ratas, Lennud unes ja ilmsi, Rändaja laul and music for the website Lastejaam. He has written original music for Kanal 2 TV-series Siberi Võmm, and wrote the theme song for the show Kontakt in the Estonian Public Broadcasting.

== Theatre ==
Robam has composed original music for Pruutide kool, Tsepeliin, Skvottimine võhikutele, Karlsonson, and Tõeajastu lõpp. He wrote original music for the 2014 Rakvere theatre production Must prints and A Cool Million: the Dismantling of Lemuel Pitkin and Väike prints by NUKU Theatre. His music has been described as "minimal... sad and atmospheric ..."

Robam released his second album "Monogram", which was a compilation of original music in 2018.

== Notable works ==
In 2012, Robam wrote Angle to Angle a composition for video, piano and eight speakers. In 2015 Piece of Mind, a composition for clarinet quintet and video premiered in Cinema Sõprus, Tallinn.

In July 2017 Robam won the first prize in Tartu town hall competition for carillon songs with his composition "Raekoja tants".

In 2019 and 2022, the Estonian Theatre Union had nominated him for the award for musical design and original music for the productions "Loodusjõud" (Von Krahl Theatre), "Üksi ja Esmeralda" (Theatrum), "Noored hinged" (NUKU Theater), "Südames sündinud" (Institute for Health Development), "Elias maa pealt" (NUKU Theater), and "Miks me varastasime auto" (Estonian Youth Theatre).

In 2023, the Estonian Theatre Union has nominated Markus Robam for the award for both musical design and original music for the productions "Sihtisid pole sel sillal" (Estonian Youth Theatre and EMTA Theatre Arts Department) as well as "Sinel" and "Hommikuvalgus" (both Estonian Youth Theatre).

In 2023, Markus Robam was nominated for the title of Best Film Composer in the Estonian Film and Television Awards competition for the original music of the film "Pätt või pühak".

== Discography ==
Albums

- Astir (2016)
- Monogram (2018)
- Upside Down (2019)
- In Crowds (2020)
- Whitewash (2020)
- Spring Prints (2022)
- Uneversum (2023)

EPs/Singles

- Angle to Angle (2012)
- Lacuna (2016)
- The Ghost in My Frog (2025)

Original music for theatre

- Pruutide kool (2011)
- Gamaheh valem (2013)
- Tsepeliin (2014)
- Lemuel Pitkini demonteerimine (2015)
- Must Prints (2015)
- Skvottimine võhikutele (2015)
- Karlsonson (2016)
- Tõeajastu lõpp (2017)
- Väike Prints (2017)
- Eluaeg (2017)
- Chagall: eraldikoos (2017)
- Üksi ja Esmeralda (2017)
- Mehed (2017)
- Loodusjõud (2018)
- Teatripäev (2018)
- Noored hinged (2018)
- Südames sündinud (2018)
- Alice imedemaal (2018)
- Naised (2018)
- Elias maa pealt (2018)
- Mulla all (2019)
- Ööpiltnikud (2019)
- Õnnelik tund (2019)
- Kas te käite siin tihti (2019)
- Whitewash (2020)
- Vapruse värinad (2020)
- Sirli, Siim ja saladused(2020)
- Jääpüük (2021)
- Miks me varastasime auto (2021)
- Rock'arella (2021)
- Mäletan/Ei mäleta (2021)
- Ninasarvik (2021)
- Sihtisid pole sel sillal (2022)
- Sinel (2022)
- Divide et Impera (2022)
- Hommikuvalgus (2022)
- Plekktrumm (2023)
- Sõda ja rahu (2023)
- Esietendus (2023)
- Kodupeatus (2023)
- Tistou, roheliste sõrmedega poiss (2024)
- Raev (2024)
- Kes kardab Virginia Woolfi (2024)
- Arabella, mereröövli tütar (2024)
- 1984 (2025)

Original music for film

- Väljakutse (2012)
- Vandenõu (2013)
- Meeleseisund (2016)
- Mehed (2019)
- Omakohus (2019)
- Sinine (2020)
- A Call Above the Clouds (2020)
- Raul Vaiksoo: Pätt või pühak (2021)
- Öine vahetus (2023)
- Fränk (2024)

Original TV themes

- Kahekõne (2013)
- Rula ja ratas (2013)
- Suud puhtaks (2016)
- Pöörijoon (2016)
- Kontakt (2017)
- Eesti mustrid (2017)
- Reis ümber Eesti (2018)
- Suud puhtaks (2020)
- Spordisangarid (2021)
- UV faktor (2021)
- OP (2022)
- Laske mind lavale (2022)
- Kultuuristuudio (2022)

Original music for TV series

- Siberi võmm (2017–2018)
- Zett (2018)
